= List of minor planets: 592001–593000 =

The following is a partial list of minor planets, running from minor-planet number 592001 through 593000, inclusive. The primary data for this and other partial lists is based on JPL's "Small-Body Orbital Elements" and data available from the Minor Planet Center. Critical list information is also provided by the MPC, unless otherwise specified from Lowell Observatory. A detailed description of the table's columns and additional sources are given on the main page including a complete list of every page in this series, and a statistical break-up on the dynamical classification of minor planets.

Also see the summary list of all named bodies in numerical and alphabetical order, and the corresponding naming citations for the number range of this particular list. New namings may only be added to this list after official publication, as the preannouncement of names is condemned by the Working Group for Small Bodies Nomenclature of the International Astronomical Union.

| Near-Earth obj. | MBA (inner) | MBA (outer) | Centaur |
| Mars-crosser | MBA (middle) | Jupiter trojan | Trans-Neptunian obj. |
| Unclassified |

== 592001–592100 ==
| Designation | | | Discovery | | | Properties | | Ref |
| Permanent | Provisional | Named after | Date | Site | Discoverer(s) | Category | Diam. | Ref |
|---|---|---|---|---|---|---|---|---|
| 592001 | 2014 KT_{71} | — | May 6, 2014 | Haleakala | Pan-STARRS 1 | URS | 2.7 km | MPC · JPL |
| 592002 | 2014 KS_{73} | — | January 19, 2007 | Mauna Kea | P. A. Wiegert | · | 2.2 km | MPC · JPL |
| 592003 | 2014 KV_{82} | — | May 21, 2014 | Haleakala | Pan-STARRS 1 | · | 570 m | MPC · JPL |
| 592004 | 2014 KU_{83} | — | October 12, 2007 | Kitt Peak | Spacewatch | · | 1.0 km | MPC · JPL |
| 592005 | 2014 KM_{94} | — | March 6, 2008 | Mount Lemmon | Mount Lemmon Survey | · | 1.8 km | MPC · JPL |
| 592006 | 2014 KD_{97} | — | October 31, 2005 | Mount Lemmon | Mount Lemmon Survey | · | 2.4 km | MPC · JPL |
| 592007 | 2014 KY_{97} | — | May 3, 2014 | Haleakala | Pan-STARRS 1 | · | 2.0 km | MPC · JPL |
| 592008 | 2014 KK_{99} | — | October 8, 2008 | Mount Lemmon | Mount Lemmon Survey | · | 520 m | MPC · JPL |
| 592009 | 2014 KP_{105} | — | May 7, 2014 | Haleakala | Pan-STARRS 1 | · | 2.2 km | MPC · JPL |
| 592010 | 2014 KS_{105} | — | May 27, 2014 | Haleakala | Pan-STARRS 1 | · | 2.3 km | MPC · JPL |
| 592011 | 2014 KK_{111} | — | November 7, 2010 | Catalina | CSS | EUP | 3.2 km | MPC · JPL |
| 592012 | 2014 KO_{112} | — | May 30, 2014 | Haleakala | Pan-STARRS 1 | TIR | 2.7 km | MPC · JPL |
| 592013 | 2014 KA_{113} | — | May 31, 2014 | Haleakala | Pan-STARRS 1 | · | 540 m | MPC · JPL |
| 592014 | 2014 KG_{113} | — | May 21, 2014 | Haleakala | Pan-STARRS 1 | · | 2.2 km | MPC · JPL |
| 592015 | 2014 KN_{113} | — | October 2, 2016 | Mount Lemmon | Mount Lemmon Survey | TIR | 2.5 km | MPC · JPL |
| 592016 | 2014 KU_{113} | — | May 28, 2014 | Haleakala | Pan-STARRS 1 | · | 530 m | MPC · JPL |
| 592017 | 2014 KN_{114} | — | May 30, 2014 | Haleakala | Pan-STARRS 1 | H | 440 m | MPC · JPL |
| 592018 | 2014 KX_{126} | — | May 20, 2014 | Haleakala | Pan-STARRS 1 | EOS | 1.6 km | MPC · JPL |
| 592019 | 2014 KM_{128} | — | May 27, 2014 | Mount Lemmon | Mount Lemmon Survey | · | 3.6 km | MPC · JPL |
| 592020 | 2014 KB_{139} | — | May 27, 2014 | Haleakala | Pan-STARRS 1 | · | 2.2 km | MPC · JPL |
| 592021 | 2014 LB_{2} | — | May 4, 2014 | Haleakala | Pan-STARRS 1 | EOS | 1.6 km | MPC · JPL |
| 592022 | 2014 LU_{10} | — | December 30, 2007 | Kitt Peak | Spacewatch | · | 1.9 km | MPC · JPL |
| 592023 | 2014 LX_{17} | — | November 20, 2000 | Apache Point | SDSS Collaboration | · | 2.2 km | MPC · JPL |
| 592024 | 2014 LA_{37} | — | June 2, 2014 | Haleakala | Pan-STARRS 1 | · | 660 m | MPC · JPL |
| 592025 | 2014 MC_{13} | — | June 21, 2014 | Mount Lemmon | Mount Lemmon Survey | · | 730 m | MPC · JPL |
| 592026 | 2014 ME_{15} | — | July 20, 2003 | Palomar | NEAT | THB | 3.2 km | MPC · JPL |
| 592027 | 2014 ML_{17} | — | June 23, 2014 | Mount Lemmon | Mount Lemmon Survey | · | 580 m | MPC · JPL |
| 592028 | 2014 MB_{22} | — | October 31, 2005 | Mount Lemmon | Mount Lemmon Survey | EOS | 2.3 km | MPC · JPL |
| 592029 | 2014 ME_{25} | — | September 18, 2003 | Kitt Peak | Spacewatch | · | 2.9 km | MPC · JPL |
| 592030 | 2014 MS_{33} | — | September 30, 1995 | Kitt Peak | Spacewatch | · | 1.8 km | MPC · JPL |
| 592031 | 2014 MX_{34} | — | June 3, 2014 | Haleakala | Pan-STARRS 1 | TIR | 2.4 km | MPC · JPL |
| 592032 | 2014 MY_{34} | — | May 28, 2014 | Haleakala | Pan-STARRS 1 | EMA | 2.5 km | MPC · JPL |
| 592033 | 2014 MR_{37} | — | June 26, 2014 | Haleakala | Pan-STARRS 1 | · | 650 m | MPC · JPL |
| 592034 | 2014 ME_{49} | — | April 10, 2013 | Haleakala | Pan-STARRS 1 | · | 1.5 km | MPC · JPL |
| 592035 | 2014 ML_{51} | — | June 23, 2009 | Mount Lemmon | Mount Lemmon Survey | · | 3.6 km | MPC · JPL |
| 592036 | 2014 MS_{53} | — | April 13, 2013 | Haleakala | Pan-STARRS 1 | · | 3.2 km | MPC · JPL |
| 592037 | 2014 MW_{53} | — | February 11, 2012 | Mount Lemmon | Mount Lemmon Survey | · | 3.0 km | MPC · JPL |
| 592038 | 2014 MY_{59} | — | October 14, 2010 | Mount Lemmon | Mount Lemmon Survey | · | 3.2 km | MPC · JPL |
| 592039 | 2014 MU_{60} | — | June 24, 2014 | Mount Lemmon | Mount Lemmon Survey | · | 650 m | MPC · JPL |
| 592040 | 2014 MV_{64} | — | October 9, 2004 | Kitt Peak | Spacewatch | · | 3.1 km | MPC · JPL |
| 592041 | 2014 MD_{65} | — | November 24, 2011 | Haleakala | Pan-STARRS 1 | · | 2.3 km | MPC · JPL |
| 592042 | 2014 MH_{65} | — | April 13, 2008 | Mount Lemmon | Mount Lemmon Survey | ARM | 2.9 km | MPC · JPL |
| 592043 | 2014 MH_{69} | — | June 21, 2014 | Haleakala | Pan-STARRS 1 | · | 2.5 km | MPC · JPL |
| 592044 | 2014 MB_{70} | — | June 26, 2014 | Haleakala | Pan-STARRS 1 | cubewano (hot) | 281 km | MPC · JPL |
| 592045 | 2014 MQ_{72} | — | June 24, 2014 | Haleakala | Pan-STARRS 1 | · | 590 m | MPC · JPL |
| 592046 | 2014 MC_{73} | — | June 29, 2014 | Haleakala | Pan-STARRS 1 | · | 2.5 km | MPC · JPL |
| 592047 | 2014 MF_{73} | — | June 29, 2014 | Haleakala | Pan-STARRS 1 | · | 2.9 km | MPC · JPL |
| 592048 | 2014 MD_{80} | — | June 21, 2014 | Haleakala | Pan-STARRS 1 | · | 3.5 km | MPC · JPL |
| 592049 | 2014 MG_{88} | — | June 28, 2014 | Haleakala | Pan-STARRS 1 | · | 2.9 km | MPC · JPL |
| 592050 | 2014 MS_{89} | — | June 19, 2014 | Haleakala | Pan-STARRS 1 | TEL | 1.2 km | MPC · JPL |
| 592051 | 2014 ML_{92} | — | June 24, 2014 | Haleakala | Pan-STARRS 1 | · | 2.3 km | MPC · JPL |
| 592052 | 2014 MN_{92} | — | June 24, 2014 | Haleakala | Pan-STARRS 1 | · | 2.3 km | MPC · JPL |
| 592053 | 2014 ND | — | January 8, 2013 | Mount Lemmon | Mount Lemmon Survey | · | 4.4 km | MPC · JPL |
| 592054 | 2014 NK | — | January 25, 2007 | Kitt Peak | Spacewatch | · | 2.6 km | MPC · JPL |
| 592055 | 2014 NX_{3} | — | July 1, 2014 | Haleakala | Pan-STARRS 1 | · | 2.5 km | MPC · JPL |
| 592056 | 2014 NN_{4} | — | March 15, 2007 | Kitt Peak | Spacewatch | · | 2.6 km | MPC · JPL |
| 592057 | 2014 NK_{11} | — | January 26, 2012 | Mount Lemmon | Mount Lemmon Survey | · | 2.4 km | MPC · JPL |
| 592058 | 2014 NR_{17} | — | September 3, 2008 | Kitt Peak | Spacewatch | · | 580 m | MPC · JPL |
| 592059 | 2014 NR_{38} | — | August 16, 2009 | Kitt Peak | Spacewatch | · | 2.4 km | MPC · JPL |
| 592060 | 2014 NS_{39} | — | March 13, 2007 | Kitt Peak | Spacewatch | · | 3.0 km | MPC · JPL |
| 592061 | 2014 NF_{44} | — | June 1, 2014 | Haleakala | Pan-STARRS 1 | · | 3.3 km | MPC · JPL |
| 592062 | 2014 NK_{45} | — | July 23, 2003 | Palomar | NEAT | · | 4.0 km | MPC · JPL |
| 592063 | 2014 NH_{47} | — | July 2, 2014 | Haleakala | Pan-STARRS 1 | · | 3.0 km | MPC · JPL |
| 592064 | 2014 NZ_{65} | — | July 6, 2014 | Haleakala | Pan-STARRS 1 | cubewano (hot) | 281 km | MPC · JPL |
| 592065 | 2014 NO_{69} | — | April 6, 2013 | Mount Lemmon | Mount Lemmon Survey | KOR | 1.0 km | MPC · JPL |
| 592066 | 2014 NG_{70} | — | July 2, 2014 | Haleakala | Pan-STARRS 1 | · | 2.6 km | MPC · JPL |
| 592067 | 2014 ND_{72} | — | July 8, 2014 | Haleakala | Pan-STARRS 1 | EUN | 950 m | MPC · JPL |
| 592068 | 2014 NO_{74} | — | July 4, 2014 | Haleakala | Pan-STARRS 1 | · | 2.1 km | MPC · JPL |
| 592069 | 2014 NW_{79} | — | July 4, 2014 | Haleakala | Pan-STARRS 1 | · | 600 m | MPC · JPL |
| 592070 | 2014 NT_{80} | — | July 1, 2014 | Haleakala | Pan-STARRS 1 | EOS | 1.8 km | MPC · JPL |
| 592071 | 2014 NN_{90} | — | December 1, 2008 | Kitt Peak | Spacewatch | V | 590 m | MPC · JPL |
| 592072 | 2014 OT_{1} | — | September 21, 2011 | Kitt Peak | Spacewatch | · | 710 m | MPC · JPL |
| 592073 | 2014 OT_{2} | — | January 19, 2012 | Mount Lemmon | Mount Lemmon Survey | · | 2.3 km | MPC · JPL |
| 592074 | 2014 OP_{10} | — | December 3, 2010 | Mount Lemmon | Mount Lemmon Survey | · | 2.4 km | MPC · JPL |
| 592075 | 2014 OQ_{10} | — | July 25, 2014 | Haleakala | Pan-STARRS 1 | · | 3.2 km | MPC · JPL |
| 592076 | 2014 OU_{14} | — | January 5, 2013 | Kitt Peak | Spacewatch | · | 560 m | MPC · JPL |
| 592077 | 2014 OA_{16} | — | August 28, 2009 | Kitt Peak | Spacewatch | · | 1.6 km | MPC · JPL |
| 592078 | 2014 OC_{25} | — | September 16, 2009 | Mount Lemmon | Mount Lemmon Survey | · | 2.1 km | MPC · JPL |
| 592079 | 2014 OM_{32} | — | July 25, 2014 | Haleakala | Pan-STARRS 1 | EOS | 1.8 km | MPC · JPL |
| 592080 | 2014 OR_{46} | — | January 30, 2006 | Kitt Peak | Spacewatch | VER | 2.3 km | MPC · JPL |
| 592081 | 2014 OJ_{48} | — | March 2, 2000 | Kitt Peak | Spacewatch | · | 670 m | MPC · JPL |
| 592082 | 2014 OD_{64} | — | November 21, 2008 | Mount Lemmon | Mount Lemmon Survey | · | 600 m | MPC · JPL |
| 592083 | 2014 OY_{65} | — | March 16, 2012 | Mount Lemmon | Mount Lemmon Survey | · | 2.9 km | MPC · JPL |
| 592084 | 2014 OQ_{70} | — | February 14, 2012 | Haleakala | Pan-STARRS 1 | · | 2.6 km | MPC · JPL |
| 592085 | 2014 OJ_{75} | — | September 28, 2008 | Mount Lemmon | Mount Lemmon Survey | · | 610 m | MPC · JPL |
| 592086 | 2014 OU_{77} | — | January 26, 2012 | Haleakala | Pan-STARRS 1 | ELF | 2.6 km | MPC · JPL |
| 592087 | 2014 OP_{81} | — | December 23, 2012 | Haleakala | Pan-STARRS 1 | · | 570 m | MPC · JPL |
| 592088 | 2014 OR_{81} | — | September 10, 2010 | Kitt Peak | Spacewatch | · | 3.0 km | MPC · JPL |
| 592089 | 2014 OA_{85} | — | June 20, 2014 | Haleakala | Pan-STARRS 1 | · | 550 m | MPC · JPL |
| 592090 | 2014 OM_{104} | — | August 20, 2009 | Kitt Peak | Spacewatch | · | 3.3 km | MPC · JPL |
| 592091 | 2014 OU_{108} | — | February 16, 2010 | Kitt Peak | Spacewatch | · | 590 m | MPC · JPL |
| 592092 | 2014 OV_{119} | — | January 18, 2012 | Bergisch Gladbach | W. Bickel | EOS | 2.0 km | MPC · JPL |
| 592093 | 2014 OZ_{122} | — | August 29, 2009 | Bergisch Gladbach | W. Bickel | · | 3.6 km | MPC · JPL |
| 592094 | 2014 OQ_{155} | — | January 19, 2012 | Kitt Peak | Spacewatch | · | 2.4 km | MPC · JPL |
| 592095 | 2014 OM_{158} | — | May 7, 2010 | Mount Lemmon | Mount Lemmon Survey | V | 650 m | MPC · JPL |
| 592096 | 2014 OE_{164} | — | April 16, 2013 | Haleakala | Pan-STARRS 1 | · | 3.2 km | MPC · JPL |
| 592097 | 2014 OQ_{164} | — | July 27, 2014 | Haleakala | Pan-STARRS 1 | · | 580 m | MPC · JPL |
| 592098 | 2014 OK_{166} | — | May 2, 2005 | Kitt Peak | Spacewatch | · | 1.4 km | MPC · JPL |
| 592099 | 2014 OM_{167} | — | June 29, 2014 | Haleakala | Pan-STARRS 1 | · | 3.0 km | MPC · JPL |
| 592100 | 2014 OL_{170} | — | November 30, 2010 | Mount Lemmon | Mount Lemmon Survey | · | 3.1 km | MPC · JPL |

== 592101–592200 ==
back to top

| Designation | | | Discovery | | | Properties | | Ref |
| Permanent | Provisional | Named after | Date | Site | Discoverer(s) | Category | Diam. | Ref |
|---|---|---|---|---|---|---|---|---|
| 592101 | 2014 OY_{172} | — | March 15, 2010 | Mount Lemmon | Mount Lemmon Survey | · | 540 m | MPC · JPL |
| 592102 | 2014 OR_{186} | — | January 20, 2009 | Kitt Peak | Spacewatch | · | 760 m | MPC · JPL |
| 592103 | 2014 OL_{191} | — | September 4, 2007 | Mount Lemmon | Mount Lemmon Survey | V | 480 m | MPC · JPL |
| 592104 | 2014 OR_{196} | — | January 31, 2009 | Mount Lemmon | Mount Lemmon Survey | · | 700 m | MPC · JPL |
| 592105 | 2014 OK_{200} | — | September 4, 2011 | Haleakala | Pan-STARRS 1 | · | 620 m | MPC · JPL |
| 592106 | 2014 OH_{206} | — | October 23, 2008 | Kitt Peak | Spacewatch | · | 560 m | MPC · JPL |
| 592107 | 2014 OG_{207} | — | September 21, 2008 | Kitt Peak | Spacewatch | · | 660 m | MPC · JPL |
| 592108 | 2014 OL_{218} | — | May 9, 2014 | Haleakala | Pan-STARRS 1 | · | 510 m | MPC · JPL |
| 592109 | 2014 OW_{222} | — | March 16, 2010 | Mount Lemmon | Mount Lemmon Survey | · | 530 m | MPC · JPL |
| 592110 | 2014 OA_{225} | — | April 20, 2007 | Kitt Peak | Spacewatch | (883) | 470 m | MPC · JPL |
| 592111 | 2014 OV_{226} | — | January 20, 2013 | Kitt Peak | Spacewatch | · | 650 m | MPC · JPL |
| 592112 | 2014 OL_{233} | — | October 16, 2001 | Palomar | NEAT | · | 700 m | MPC · JPL |
| 592113 | 2014 OE_{237} | — | February 10, 2007 | Mount Lemmon | Mount Lemmon Survey | EOS | 2.0 km | MPC · JPL |
| 592114 | 2014 OF_{237} | — | March 2, 2012 | Mount Lemmon | Mount Lemmon Survey | · | 2.4 km | MPC · JPL |
| 592115 | 2014 OW_{237} | — | January 23, 2011 | Mount Lemmon | Mount Lemmon Survey | · | 2.9 km | MPC · JPL |
| 592116 | 2014 OB_{244} | — | August 16, 2009 | Kitt Peak | Spacewatch | · | 3.7 km | MPC · JPL |
| 592117 | 2014 OT_{244} | — | October 8, 2008 | Kitt Peak | Spacewatch | · | 510 m | MPC · JPL |
| 592118 | 2014 OC_{253} | — | July 29, 2014 | Haleakala | Pan-STARRS 1 | · | 2.9 km | MPC · JPL |
| 592119 | 2014 OV_{253} | — | October 22, 2003 | Kitt Peak | Spacewatch | · | 2.8 km | MPC · JPL |
| 592120 | 2014 OY_{256} | — | August 29, 2009 | Kitt Peak | Spacewatch | · | 2.3 km | MPC · JPL |
| 592121 | 2014 OX_{258} | — | June 29, 2014 | Haleakala | Pan-STARRS 1 | · | 2.9 km | MPC · JPL |
| 592122 | 2014 OP_{259} | — | March 18, 2010 | Mount Lemmon | Mount Lemmon Survey | · | 550 m | MPC · JPL |
| 592123 | 2014 OT_{259} | — | November 8, 2010 | Mount Lemmon | Mount Lemmon Survey | · | 2.8 km | MPC · JPL |
| 592124 | 2014 OR_{260} | — | March 17, 2010 | Kitt Peak | Spacewatch | · | 730 m | MPC · JPL |
| 592125 | 2014 OG_{262} | — | September 26, 2011 | Haleakala | Pan-STARRS 1 | · | 520 m | MPC · JPL |
| 592126 | 2014 OQ_{272} | — | October 16, 2009 | Mount Lemmon | Mount Lemmon Survey | · | 2.4 km | MPC · JPL |
| 592127 | 2014 OL_{293} | — | July 31, 2000 | Cerro Tololo | Deep Ecliptic Survey | · | 710 m | MPC · JPL |
| 592128 | 2014 OO_{297} | — | May 31, 2014 | Haleakala | Pan-STARRS 1 | · | 740 m | MPC · JPL |
| 592129 | 2014 OP_{297} | — | July 29, 2014 | Haleakala | Pan-STARRS 1 | · | 2.4 km | MPC · JPL |
| 592130 | 2014 OT_{297} | — | August 22, 2004 | Kitt Peak | Spacewatch | KOR | 1.1 km | MPC · JPL |
| 592131 | 2014 OR_{303} | — | September 30, 2010 | Mount Lemmon | Mount Lemmon Survey | KOR | 1.3 km | MPC · JPL |
| 592132 | 2014 OW_{307} | — | July 27, 2014 | Haleakala | Pan-STARRS 1 | · | 2.6 km | MPC · JPL |
| 592133 | 2014 OT_{315} | — | July 27, 2014 | Haleakala | Pan-STARRS 1 | · | 450 m | MPC · JPL |
| 592134 | 2014 OK_{320} | — | June 26, 2014 | Haleakala | Pan-STARRS 1 | VER | 2.2 km | MPC · JPL |
| 592135 | 2014 OA_{341} | — | April 19, 2013 | Haleakala | Pan-STARRS 1 | · | 3.0 km | MPC · JPL |
| 592136 | 2014 OJ_{343} | — | December 4, 2008 | Kitt Peak | Spacewatch | · | 630 m | MPC · JPL |
| 592137 | 2014 OA_{346} | — | August 26, 2003 | Cerro Tololo | Deep Ecliptic Survey | VER | 2.7 km | MPC · JPL |
| 592138 | 2014 OJ_{356} | — | March 11, 2013 | Mount Lemmon | Mount Lemmon Survey | · | 600 m | MPC · JPL |
| 592139 | 2014 OW_{358} | — | September 23, 2008 | Mount Lemmon | Mount Lemmon Survey | · | 3.0 km | MPC · JPL |
| 592140 | 2014 ON_{359} | — | January 29, 2012 | Mount Lemmon | Mount Lemmon Survey | LIX | 3.4 km | MPC · JPL |
| 592141 | 2014 OE_{367} | — | December 27, 2011 | Mount Lemmon | Mount Lemmon Survey | LIX | 3.3 km | MPC · JPL |
| 592142 | 2014 OG_{379} | — | June 21, 2014 | Haleakala | Pan-STARRS 1 | · | 3.1 km | MPC · JPL |
| 592143 | 2014 OO_{381} | — | March 13, 2008 | Kitt Peak | Spacewatch | · | 1.4 km | MPC · JPL |
| 592144 | 2014 OC_{384} | — | September 17, 2009 | Kitt Peak | Spacewatch | · | 2.5 km | MPC · JPL |
| 592145 | 2014 OF_{387} | — | October 28, 2011 | Mount Lemmon | Mount Lemmon Survey | · | 600 m | MPC · JPL |
| 592146 | 2014 OU_{390} | — | February 14, 2012 | Haleakala | Pan-STARRS 1 | · | 2.2 km | MPC · JPL |
| 592147 | 2014 OA_{394} | — | July 25, 2014 | Haleakala | Pan-STARRS 1 | cubewano (cold) | 147 km | MPC · JPL |
| 592148 | 2014 OM_{394} | — | July 31, 2014 | Haleakala | Pan-STARRS 1 | cubewano (cold) | 204 km | MPC · JPL |
| 592149 | 2014 OR_{394} | — | July 28, 2014 | Haleakala | Pan-STARRS 1 | SDO | 136 km | MPC · JPL |
| 592150 | 2014 OQ_{439} | — | July 2, 2014 | Haleakala | Pan-STARRS 1 | EOS | 1.5 km | MPC · JPL |
| 592151 | 2014 PR_{3} | — | September 22, 2003 | Kitt Peak | Spacewatch | · | 3.5 km | MPC · JPL |
| 592152 | 2014 PB_{8} | — | August 10, 2007 | Kitt Peak | Spacewatch | V | 610 m | MPC · JPL |
| 592153 | 2014 PM_{8} | — | June 5, 2014 | Haleakala | Pan-STARRS 1 | · | 550 m | MPC · JPL |
| 592154 | 2014 PV_{13} | — | September 28, 2011 | Kitt Peak | Spacewatch | · | 570 m | MPC · JPL |
| 592155 | 2014 PE_{15} | — | February 14, 2013 | Mount Lemmon | Mount Lemmon Survey | · | 660 m | MPC · JPL |
| 592156 | 2014 PO_{43} | — | January 4, 2012 | Mount Lemmon | Mount Lemmon Survey | PHO | 800 m | MPC · JPL |
| 592157 | 2014 PY_{45} | — | February 8, 2013 | Haleakala | Pan-STARRS 1 | · | 660 m | MPC · JPL |
| 592158 | 2014 PR_{48} | — | July 9, 2003 | Kitt Peak | Spacewatch | · | 3.1 km | MPC · JPL |
| 592159 | 2014 PR_{52} | — | September 5, 2008 | Kitt Peak | Spacewatch | · | 3.3 km | MPC · JPL |
| 592160 | 2014 PD_{60} | — | December 5, 2010 | Mount Lemmon | Mount Lemmon Survey | · | 2.6 km | MPC · JPL |
| 592161 | 2014 PG_{62} | — | July 26, 2014 | Haleakala | Pan-STARRS 1 | · | 640 m | MPC · JPL |
| 592162 | 2014 PZ_{71} | — | September 18, 2003 | Palomar | NEAT | VER | 3.3 km | MPC · JPL |
| 592163 | 2014 PO_{76} | — | February 5, 2009 | Kitt Peak | Spacewatch | · | 830 m | MPC · JPL |
| 592164 | 2014 PZ_{78} | — | July 12, 2005 | Kitt Peak | Spacewatch | · | 1.8 km | MPC · JPL |
| 592165 | 2014 PK_{82} | — | August 6, 2014 | Haleakala | Pan-STARRS 1 | V | 560 m | MPC · JPL |
| 592166 | 2014 PP_{96} | — | August 3, 2014 | Haleakala | Pan-STARRS 1 | · | 1.3 km | MPC · JPL |
| 592167 | 2014 QX_{3} | — | October 3, 2003 | Kitt Peak | Spacewatch | · | 2.9 km | MPC · JPL |
| 592168 | 2014 QG_{6} | — | September 30, 2009 | Mount Lemmon | Mount Lemmon Survey | · | 3.2 km | MPC · JPL |
| 592169 | 2014 QD_{8} | — | September 15, 2009 | Kitt Peak | Spacewatch | · | 3.0 km | MPC · JPL |
| 592170 Arkadyinin | 2014 QK_{20} | Arkadyinin | November 24, 2011 | Zelenchukskaya Stn | T. V. Krjačko, Satovski, B. | · | 890 m | MPC · JPL |
| 592171 | 2014 QE_{23} | — | September 29, 2001 | Palomar | NEAT | SYL | 5.2 km | MPC · JPL |
| 592172 | 2014 QO_{26} | — | January 7, 2006 | Kitt Peak | Spacewatch | EOS | 1.6 km | MPC · JPL |
| 592173 | 2014 QM_{34} | — | December 11, 2010 | Mount Lemmon | Mount Lemmon Survey | · | 3.4 km | MPC · JPL |
| 592174 | 2014 QF_{36} | — | August 23, 2003 | Palomar | NEAT | · | 3.4 km | MPC · JPL |
| 592175 | 2014 QC_{37} | — | July 4, 2014 | Haleakala | Pan-STARRS 1 | · | 2.7 km | MPC · JPL |
| 592176 | 2014 QJ_{37} | — | August 25, 2004 | Kitt Peak | Spacewatch | · | 460 m | MPC · JPL |
| 592177 | 2014 QS_{47} | — | October 25, 2011 | Haleakala | Pan-STARRS 1 | · | 390 m | MPC · JPL |
| 592178 | 2014 QJ_{51} | — | July 2, 2014 | Haleakala | Pan-STARRS 1 | · | 1.9 km | MPC · JPL |
| 592179 | 2014 QK_{52} | — | March 13, 2013 | Haleakala | Pan-STARRS 1 | · | 590 m | MPC · JPL |
| 592180 | 2014 QQ_{56} | — | September 27, 2011 | Mount Lemmon | Mount Lemmon Survey | · | 540 m | MPC · JPL |
| 592181 | 2014 QJ_{58} | — | July 1, 2014 | Haleakala | Pan-STARRS 1 | · | 2.8 km | MPC · JPL |
| 592182 | 2014 QC_{62} | — | July 3, 2014 | Haleakala | Pan-STARRS 1 | · | 550 m | MPC · JPL |
| 592183 | 2014 QJ_{73} | — | September 19, 2011 | Haleakala | Pan-STARRS 1 | · | 730 m | MPC · JPL |
| 592184 | 2014 QY_{74} | — | November 14, 2010 | Kitt Peak | Spacewatch | · | 3.1 km | MPC · JPL |
| 592185 | 2014 QW_{76} | — | November 30, 2011 | Mount Lemmon | Mount Lemmon Survey | · | 600 m | MPC · JPL |
| 592186 | 2014 QF_{77} | — | July 1, 2014 | Haleakala | Pan-STARRS 1 | · | 700 m | MPC · JPL |
| 592187 | 2014 QZ_{79} | — | March 11, 2007 | Kitt Peak | Spacewatch | · | 3.4 km | MPC · JPL |
| 592188 | 2014 QC_{80} | — | August 20, 2014 | Haleakala | Pan-STARRS 1 | · | 610 m | MPC · JPL |
| 592189 | 2014 QP_{96} | — | November 20, 2008 | Kitt Peak | Spacewatch | · | 690 m | MPC · JPL |
| 592190 | 2014 QC_{106} | — | January 5, 2013 | Mount Lemmon | Mount Lemmon Survey | · | 630 m | MPC · JPL |
| 592191 | 2014 QD_{106} | — | January 13, 2003 | Kitt Peak | Spacewatch | · | 650 m | MPC · JPL |
| 592192 | 2014 QT_{107} | — | January 20, 2013 | Mount Lemmon | Mount Lemmon Survey | · | 550 m | MPC · JPL |
| 592193 | 2014 QH_{112} | — | December 30, 2005 | Kitt Peak | Spacewatch | · | 580 m | MPC · JPL |
| 592194 | 2014 QJ_{114} | — | August 20, 2014 | Haleakala | Pan-STARRS 1 | V | 410 m | MPC · JPL |
| 592195 | 2014 QH_{117} | — | October 24, 2009 | Kitt Peak | Spacewatch | · | 1.8 km | MPC · JPL |
| 592196 | 2014 QE_{119} | — | February 1, 2006 | Mount Lemmon | Mount Lemmon Survey | · | 1.5 km | MPC · JPL |
| 592197 | 2014 QL_{121} | — | March 8, 2013 | Haleakala | Pan-STARRS 1 | · | 530 m | MPC · JPL |
| 592198 | 2014 QD_{125} | — | September 29, 2003 | Kitt Peak | Spacewatch | · | 2.0 km | MPC · JPL |
| 592199 | 2014 QH_{131} | — | October 23, 2011 | Mount Lemmon | Mount Lemmon Survey | · | 660 m | MPC · JPL |
| 592200 | 2014 QK_{131} | — | August 20, 2014 | Haleakala | Pan-STARRS 1 | · | 700 m | MPC · JPL |

== 592201–592300 ==
back to top

| Designation | | | Discovery | | | Properties | | Ref |
| Permanent | Provisional | Named after | Date | Site | Discoverer(s) | Category | Diam. | Ref |
|---|---|---|---|---|---|---|---|---|
| 592201 | 2014 QL_{132} | — | March 8, 2013 | Haleakala | Pan-STARRS 1 | · | 510 m | MPC · JPL |
| 592202 | 2014 QM_{136} | — | October 25, 2005 | Kitt Peak | Spacewatch | · | 1.5 km | MPC · JPL |
| 592203 | 2014 QP_{140} | — | August 30, 2003 | Kitt Peak | Spacewatch | EOS | 1.7 km | MPC · JPL |
| 592204 | 2014 QW_{148} | — | July 31, 2014 | Haleakala | Pan-STARRS 1 | · | 1.1 km | MPC · JPL |
| 592205 | 2014 QO_{153} | — | July 1, 2014 | Haleakala | Pan-STARRS 1 | · | 2.6 km | MPC · JPL |
| 592206 | 2014 QA_{160} | — | April 13, 2013 | Haleakala | Pan-STARRS 1 | EOS | 1.8 km | MPC · JPL |
| 592207 | 2014 QJ_{160} | — | June 29, 2014 | Haleakala | Pan-STARRS 1 | · | 2.6 km | MPC · JPL |
| 592208 | 2014 QU_{162} | — | November 17, 2011 | Kitt Peak | Spacewatch | · | 1.0 km | MPC · JPL |
| 592209 | 2014 QV_{162} | — | December 6, 2008 | Kitt Peak | Spacewatch | · | 570 m | MPC · JPL |
| 592210 | 2014 QU_{175} | — | December 18, 2004 | Mount Lemmon | Mount Lemmon Survey | · | 680 m | MPC · JPL |
| 592211 | 2014 QL_{184} | — | November 25, 2005 | Mount Lemmon | Mount Lemmon Survey | · | 730 m | MPC · JPL |
| 592212 | 2014 QH_{187} | — | March 18, 2013 | Mount Lemmon | Mount Lemmon Survey | · | 520 m | MPC · JPL |
| 592213 | 2014 QG_{195} | — | August 22, 2014 | Haleakala | Pan-STARRS 1 | · | 710 m | MPC · JPL |
| 592214 | 2014 QB_{199} | — | December 30, 2005 | Kitt Peak | Spacewatch | · | 3.0 km | MPC · JPL |
| 592215 | 2014 QR_{200} | — | October 11, 2010 | Mount Lemmon | Mount Lemmon Survey | · | 1.2 km | MPC · JPL |
| 592216 | 2014 QU_{211} | — | July 26, 2014 | Haleakala | Pan-STARRS 1 | · | 520 m | MPC · JPL |
| 592217 | 2014 QG_{218} | — | February 11, 2013 | Catalina | CSS | · | 690 m | MPC · JPL |
| 592218 | 2014 QN_{232} | — | October 10, 2010 | Kitt Peak | Spacewatch | · | 1.1 km | MPC · JPL |
| 592219 | 2014 QQ_{232} | — | June 23, 2014 | Mount Lemmon | Mount Lemmon Survey | · | 560 m | MPC · JPL |
| 592220 | 2014 QJ_{240} | — | November 4, 2005 | Mount Lemmon | Mount Lemmon Survey | KOR | 1.1 km | MPC · JPL |
| 592221 | 2014 QZ_{241} | — | August 22, 2014 | Haleakala | Pan-STARRS 1 | · | 810 m | MPC · JPL |
| 592222 | 2014 QN_{249} | — | August 22, 2014 | Haleakala | Pan-STARRS 1 | TIR | 1.8 km | MPC · JPL |
| 592223 | 2014 QJ_{254} | — | October 15, 2004 | Mount Lemmon | Mount Lemmon Survey | · | 830 m | MPC · JPL |
| 592224 | 2014 QD_{268} | — | December 2, 2005 | Mauna Kea | A. Boattini | · | 750 m | MPC · JPL |
| 592225 | 2014 QU_{272} | — | September 19, 1998 | Apache Point | SDSS Collaboration | · | 3.0 km | MPC · JPL |
| 592226 | 2014 QR_{278} | — | December 1, 2010 | Mount Lemmon | Mount Lemmon Survey | · | 1.9 km | MPC · JPL |
| 592227 | 2014 QD_{302} | — | October 7, 2005 | Mauna Kea | A. Boattini | · | 560 m | MPC · JPL |
| 592228 | 2014 QA_{303} | — | April 15, 2013 | Haleakala | Pan-STARRS 1 | · | 3.3 km | MPC · JPL |
| 592229 | 2014 QS_{336} | — | February 22, 2006 | Mount Lemmon | Mount Lemmon Survey | · | 850 m | MPC · JPL |
| 592230 | 2014 QP_{353} | — | September 30, 2003 | Kitt Peak | Spacewatch | THM | 2.1 km | MPC · JPL |
| 592231 | 2014 QD_{356} | — | May 7, 2010 | Mount Lemmon | Mount Lemmon Survey | · | 640 m | MPC · JPL |
| 592232 | 2014 QF_{364} | — | March 27, 2003 | Kitt Peak | Spacewatch | · | 640 m | MPC · JPL |
| 592233 | 2014 QT_{387} | — | October 29, 2005 | Catalina | CSS | · | 2.7 km | MPC · JPL |
| 592234 | 2014 QO_{391} | — | November 2, 2004 | Anderson Mesa | LONEOS | EUP | 3.5 km | MPC · JPL |
| 592235 | 2014 QJ_{392} | — | August 26, 2014 | Haleakala | Pan-STARRS 1 | · | 680 m | MPC · JPL |
| 592236 | 2014 QO_{392} | — | April 21, 2009 | Kitt Peak | Spacewatch | · | 1.2 km | MPC · JPL |
| 592237 | 2014 QP_{407} | — | July 7, 2014 | Haleakala | Pan-STARRS 1 | · | 560 m | MPC · JPL |
| 592238 | 2014 QQ_{416} | — | April 20, 2010 | Kitt Peak | Spacewatch | · | 550 m | MPC · JPL |
| 592239 | 2014 QE_{417} | — | March 25, 2006 | Palomar | NEAT | · | 980 m | MPC · JPL |
| 592240 | 2014 QX_{418} | — | January 2, 2012 | Mount Lemmon | Mount Lemmon Survey | · | 560 m | MPC · JPL |
| 592241 | 2014 QS_{419} | — | October 7, 2005 | Mauna Kea | A. Boattini | · | 860 m | MPC · JPL |
| 592242 | 2014 QM_{422} | — | October 20, 2011 | Mount Lemmon | Mount Lemmon Survey | · | 620 m | MPC · JPL |
| 592243 | 2014 QW_{430} | — | February 26, 2008 | Mount Lemmon | Mount Lemmon Survey | · | 1.4 km | MPC · JPL |
| 592244 Daukantas | 2014 QF_{439} | Daukantas | May 6, 2013 | Baldone | K. Černis, I. Eglītis | V | 560 m | MPC · JPL |
| 592245 | 2014 QR_{441} | — | August 18, 2014 | Cerro Tololo | DECam | SDO | 160 km | MPC · JPL |
| 592246 | 2014 QE_{448} | — | October 1, 2005 | Mount Lemmon | Mount Lemmon Survey | · | 1.9 km | MPC · JPL |
| 592247 | 2014 QH_{451} | — | January 1, 2012 | Mount Lemmon | Mount Lemmon Survey | · | 1.0 km | MPC · JPL |
| 592248 | 2014 QS_{460} | — | March 15, 2013 | Kitt Peak | Spacewatch | · | 570 m | MPC · JPL |
| 592249 | 2014 QW_{463} | — | April 19, 2004 | Kitt Peak | Spacewatch | · | 1.8 km | MPC · JPL |
| 592250 | 2014 QH_{472} | — | August 31, 2014 | Kitt Peak | Spacewatch | V | 480 m | MPC · JPL |
| 592251 | 2014 QJ_{477} | — | June 11, 2010 | Mount Lemmon | Mount Lemmon Survey | · | 670 m | MPC · JPL |
| 592252 | 2014 QQ_{484} | — | April 12, 2004 | Kitt Peak | Spacewatch | · | 1.4 km | MPC · JPL |
| 592253 | 2014 QD_{486} | — | March 21, 2010 | Mount Lemmon | Mount Lemmon Survey | · | 750 m | MPC · JPL |
| 592254 | 2014 QY_{492} | — | August 25, 2014 | Haleakala | Pan-STARRS 1 | · | 580 m | MPC · JPL |
| 592255 | 2014 QW_{522} | — | August 31, 2014 | Haleakala | Pan-STARRS 1 | · | 580 m | MPC · JPL |
| 592256 | 2014 QE_{527} | — | August 30, 2014 | Haleakala | Pan-STARRS 1 | PHO | 840 m | MPC · JPL |
| 592257 | 2014 RR_{1} | — | July 31, 2014 | Haleakala | Pan-STARRS 1 | · | 3.2 km | MPC · JPL |
| 592258 | 2014 RL_{21} | — | February 3, 2012 | Haleakala | Pan-STARRS 1 | · | 2.0 km | MPC · JPL |
| 592259 | 2014 RQ_{26} | — | June 24, 2014 | Haleakala | Pan-STARRS 1 | · | 540 m | MPC · JPL |
| 592260 | 2014 RF_{37} | — | September 16, 2003 | Kitt Peak | Spacewatch | THM | 1.9 km | MPC · JPL |
| 592261 | 2014 RW_{37} | — | September 21, 2003 | Kitt Peak | Spacewatch | V | 510 m | MPC · JPL |
| 592262 | 2014 RD_{47} | — | March 14, 2012 | Mount Lemmon | Mount Lemmon Survey | · | 2.8 km | MPC · JPL |
| 592263 | 2014 RE_{48} | — | April 6, 2013 | Mount Lemmon | Mount Lemmon Survey | · | 670 m | MPC · JPL |
| 592264 | 2014 RU_{56} | — | February 9, 1999 | Kitt Peak | Spacewatch | · | 790 m | MPC · JPL |
| 592265 | 2014 RS_{78} | — | September 4, 2014 | Haleakala | Pan-STARRS 1 | · | 980 m | MPC · JPL |
| 592266 | 2014 SK_{1} | — | July 25, 2014 | Haleakala | Pan-STARRS 1 | · | 740 m | MPC · JPL |
| 592267 | 2014 SE_{2} | — | September 16, 2014 | Elena Remote | Oreshko, A. | · | 640 m | MPC · JPL |
| 592268 | 2014 SE_{12} | — | September 12, 2007 | Mount Lemmon | Mount Lemmon Survey | · | 660 m | MPC · JPL |
| 592269 | 2014 SD_{16} | — | May 18, 2002 | Palomar | NEAT | · | 2.3 km | MPC · JPL |
| 592270 | 2014 SX_{18} | — | January 14, 2002 | Kitt Peak | Spacewatch | KOR | 1.3 km | MPC · JPL |
| 592271 | 2014 SX_{32} | — | March 3, 2009 | Kitt Peak | Spacewatch | · | 660 m | MPC · JPL |
| 592272 | 2014 SR_{35} | — | August 22, 2004 | Kitt Peak | Spacewatch | KOR | 1.1 km | MPC · JPL |
| 592273 | 2014 SX_{36} | — | August 20, 2014 | Haleakala | Pan-STARRS 1 | KOR | 1.3 km | MPC · JPL |
| 592274 | 2014 SP_{37} | — | July 7, 2014 | Haleakala | Pan-STARRS 1 | · | 700 m | MPC · JPL |
| 592275 | 2014 SR_{42} | — | December 14, 2010 | Mount Lemmon | Mount Lemmon Survey | · | 2.8 km | MPC · JPL |
| 592276 | 2014 SY_{46} | — | June 22, 2007 | Kitt Peak | Spacewatch | (2076) | 580 m | MPC · JPL |
| 592277 | 2014 SF_{49} | — | March 18, 2009 | Kitt Peak | Spacewatch | NYS | 1.1 km | MPC · JPL |
| 592278 | 2014 SM_{51} | — | April 12, 2013 | Haleakala | Pan-STARRS 1 | V | 490 m | MPC · JPL |
| 592279 | 2014 ST_{51} | — | November 25, 2011 | Haleakala | Pan-STARRS 1 | · | 470 m | MPC · JPL |
| 592280 | 2014 SZ_{54} | — | March 24, 2009 | Mount Lemmon | Mount Lemmon Survey | · | 740 m | MPC · JPL |
| 592281 | 2014 SN_{61} | — | May 2, 2006 | Mount Lemmon | Mount Lemmon Survey | · | 700 m | MPC · JPL |
| 592282 | 2014 SA_{67} | — | October 19, 2011 | Mount Lemmon | Mount Lemmon Survey | · | 650 m | MPC · JPL |
| 592283 | 2014 SP_{83} | — | July 30, 2014 | Haleakala | Pan-STARRS 1 | · | 510 m | MPC · JPL |
| 592284 | 2014 SM_{96} | — | September 18, 2014 | Haleakala | Pan-STARRS 1 | · | 540 m | MPC · JPL |
| 592285 | 2014 SV_{97} | — | March 8, 2013 | Haleakala | Pan-STARRS 1 | · | 610 m | MPC · JPL |
| 592286 | 2014 SR_{104} | — | October 5, 2005 | Kitt Peak | Spacewatch | · | 1.4 km | MPC · JPL |
| 592287 | 2014 SM_{114} | — | September 28, 2003 | Kitt Peak | Spacewatch | NYS | 890 m | MPC · JPL |
| 592288 | 2014 SZ_{136} | — | October 22, 2009 | Mount Lemmon | Mount Lemmon Survey | · | 1.6 km | MPC · JPL |
| 592289 | 2014 SS_{142} | — | September 8, 2007 | Mount Lemmon | Mount Lemmon Survey | · | 270 m | MPC · JPL |
| 592290 | 2014 SD_{151} | — | January 20, 2009 | Mount Lemmon | Mount Lemmon Survey | · | 900 m | MPC · JPL |
| 592291 | 2014 SU_{151} | — | March 5, 2006 | Kitt Peak | Spacewatch | · | 910 m | MPC · JPL |
| 592292 | 2014 SX_{172} | — | March 12, 2013 | Mount Lemmon | Mount Lemmon Survey | · | 640 m | MPC · JPL |
| 592293 | 2014 SX_{177} | — | September 18, 2007 | Kitt Peak | Spacewatch | · | 760 m | MPC · JPL |
| 592294 | 2014 SH_{181} | — | October 15, 2004 | Mount Lemmon | Mount Lemmon Survey | · | 590 m | MPC · JPL |
| 592295 | 2014 SP_{203} | — | October 30, 2005 | Kitt Peak | Spacewatch | · | 1.8 km | MPC · JPL |
| 592296 | 2014 SQ_{204} | — | January 25, 2009 | Kitt Peak | Spacewatch | · | 560 m | MPC · JPL |
| 592297 | 2014 SU_{213} | — | September 30, 2000 | Anderson Mesa | LONEOS | · | 980 m | MPC · JPL |
| 592298 | 2014 SU_{225} | — | November 27, 2011 | Mount Lemmon | Mount Lemmon Survey | · | 690 m | MPC · JPL |
| 592299 | 2014 SF_{230} | — | September 19, 2014 | Haleakala | Pan-STARRS 1 | · | 620 m | MPC · JPL |
| 592300 | 2014 SE_{234} | — | May 2, 2003 | Kitt Peak | Spacewatch | · | 740 m | MPC · JPL |

== 592301–592400 ==
back to top

| Designation | | | Discovery | | | Properties | | Ref |
| Permanent | Provisional | Named after | Date | Site | Discoverer(s) | Category | Diam. | Ref |
|---|---|---|---|---|---|---|---|---|
| 592301 | 2014 SB_{239} | — | September 27, 2009 | Kitt Peak | Spacewatch | EOS | 2.2 km | MPC · JPL |
| 592302 | 2014 SE_{239} | — | September 30, 2003 | Kitt Peak | Spacewatch | VER | 2.9 km | MPC · JPL |
| 592303 | 2014 SH_{243} | — | October 20, 2011 | Mount Lemmon | Mount Lemmon Survey | · | 670 m | MPC · JPL |
| 592304 | 2014 SV_{244} | — | September 22, 2009 | Mount Lemmon | Mount Lemmon Survey | · | 2.6 km | MPC · JPL |
| 592305 | 2014 SC_{245} | — | August 20, 2014 | Haleakala | Pan-STARRS 1 | · | 680 m | MPC · JPL |
| 592306 | 2014 SW_{246} | — | April 17, 2013 | Haleakala | Pan-STARRS 1 | · | 770 m | MPC · JPL |
| 592307 | 2014 SS_{248} | — | August 27, 2014 | Haleakala | Pan-STARRS 1 | · | 3.1 km | MPC · JPL |
| 592308 | 2014 SJ_{249} | — | April 9, 2010 | Kitt Peak | Spacewatch | · | 680 m | MPC · JPL |
| 592309 | 2014 SO_{250} | — | October 27, 2009 | Kitt Peak | Spacewatch | · | 2.7 km | MPC · JPL |
| 592310 | 2014 SU_{252} | — | November 7, 2005 | Mauna Kea | A. Boattini | · | 2.1 km | MPC · JPL |
| 592311 | 2014 SG_{256} | — | October 10, 2007 | Mount Lemmon | Mount Lemmon Survey | · | 660 m | MPC · JPL |
| 592312 | 2014 SY_{258} | — | November 9, 2009 | Kitt Peak | Spacewatch | · | 1.6 km | MPC · JPL |
| 592313 | 2014 SG_{265} | — | September 13, 2007 | Mount Lemmon | Mount Lemmon Survey | · | 630 m | MPC · JPL |
| 592314 | 2014 SR_{311} | — | December 29, 2011 | Mount Lemmon | Mount Lemmon Survey | · | 620 m | MPC · JPL |
| 592315 | 2014 ST_{311} | — | September 14, 2014 | Mount Lemmon | Mount Lemmon Survey | · | 640 m | MPC · JPL |
| 592316 | 2014 SZ_{313} | — | September 26, 2014 | Kitt Peak | Spacewatch | · | 740 m | MPC · JPL |
| 592317 | 2014 SL_{315} | — | October 15, 2007 | 7300 | W. K. Y. Yeung | · | 580 m | MPC · JPL |
| 592318 | 2014 SX_{318} | — | September 17, 2009 | Kitt Peak | Spacewatch | · | 2.0 km | MPC · JPL |
| 592319 | 2014 SF_{319} | — | September 22, 2003 | Kitt Peak | Spacewatch | · | 1.8 km | MPC · JPL |
| 592320 | 2014 SD_{321} | — | October 15, 2007 | Mount Lemmon | Mount Lemmon Survey | · | 600 m | MPC · JPL |
| 592321 | 2014 SN_{323} | — | April 17, 2013 | Haleakala | Pan-STARRS 1 | · | 890 m | MPC · JPL |
| 592322 | 2014 SV_{331} | — | October 7, 2007 | Catalina | CSS | · | 800 m | MPC · JPL |
| 592323 | 2014 SQ_{334} | — | May 29, 2003 | Kitt Peak | Spacewatch | · | 920 m | MPC · JPL |
| 592324 | 2014 SG_{354} | — | April 23, 2007 | Mount Lemmon | Mount Lemmon Survey | EUP | 3.2 km | MPC · JPL |
| 592325 | 2014 SS_{359} | — | October 8, 2005 | Kitt Peak | Spacewatch | · | 1.5 km | MPC · JPL |
| 592326 | 2014 SW_{399} | — | September 18, 2014 | Haleakala | Pan-STARRS 1 | · | 560 m | MPC · JPL |
| 592327 | 2014 TB_{3} | — | September 14, 2007 | Kitt Peak | Spacewatch | · | 640 m | MPC · JPL |
| 592328 | 2014 TE_{7} | — | May 6, 2006 | Kitt Peak | Spacewatch | · | 760 m | MPC · JPL |
| 592329 | 2014 TQ_{9} | — | October 4, 2007 | Kitt Peak | Spacewatch | · | 850 m | MPC · JPL |
| 592330 | 2014 TT_{11} | — | September 16, 2003 | Kitt Peak | Spacewatch | · | 2.1 km | MPC · JPL |
| 592331 | 2014 TK_{13} | — | October 1, 2014 | Haleakala | Pan-STARRS 1 | · | 860 m | MPC · JPL |
| 592332 | 2014 TG_{15} | — | October 13, 2007 | Catalina | CSS | · | 620 m | MPC · JPL |
| 592333 | 2014 TB_{20} | — | February 3, 2012 | Haleakala | Pan-STARRS 1 | · | 640 m | MPC · JPL |
| 592334 | 2014 TZ_{24} | — | September 21, 2003 | Kitt Peak | Spacewatch | · | 2.1 km | MPC · JPL |
| 592335 | 2014 TE_{32} | — | September 23, 2014 | Mount Lemmon | Mount Lemmon Survey | AGN | 980 m | MPC · JPL |
| 592336 | 2014 TT_{33} | — | May 4, 2006 | Mount Lemmon | Mount Lemmon Survey | · | 400 m | MPC · JPL |
| 592337 | 2014 TQ_{36} | — | September 22, 2003 | Anderson Mesa | LONEOS | · | 1.1 km | MPC · JPL |
| 592338 | 2014 TS_{39} | — | October 1, 2014 | Haleakala | Pan-STARRS 1 | · | 720 m | MPC · JPL |
| 592339 | 2014 TC_{40} | — | June 30, 2014 | Haleakala | Pan-STARRS 1 | · | 2.1 km | MPC · JPL |
| 592340 | 2014 TR_{46} | — | February 19, 2001 | Kitt Peak | Spacewatch | MAS | 640 m | MPC · JPL |
| 592341 | 2014 TE_{52} | — | January 2, 2012 | Kitt Peak | Spacewatch | · | 670 m | MPC · JPL |
| 592342 | 2014 TZ_{55} | — | September 9, 2007 | Kitt Peak | Spacewatch | · | 790 m | MPC · JPL |
| 592343 | 2014 TA_{56} | — | November 2, 2007 | Kitt Peak | Spacewatch | · | 890 m | MPC · JPL |
| 592344 | 2014 TK_{69} | — | December 5, 2007 | Mount Lemmon | Mount Lemmon Survey | · | 720 m | MPC · JPL |
| 592345 | 2014 TF_{71} | — | October 20, 2003 | Kitt Peak | Spacewatch | · | 810 m | MPC · JPL |
| 592346 | 2014 TA_{78} | — | September 14, 2014 | Kitt Peak | Spacewatch | V | 530 m | MPC · JPL |
| 592347 | 2014 TC_{79} | — | October 25, 2011 | Haleakala | Pan-STARRS 1 | · | 770 m | MPC · JPL |
| 592348 | 2014 TE_{80} | — | January 26, 2012 | Mount Lemmon | Mount Lemmon Survey | · | 660 m | MPC · JPL |
| 592349 | 2014 TN_{85} | — | November 28, 2011 | Mount Lemmon | Mount Lemmon Survey | · | 740 m | MPC · JPL |
| 592350 | 2014 TQ_{85} | — | July 9, 2003 | Kitt Peak | Spacewatch | · | 2.5 km | MPC · JPL |
| 592351 | 2014 TN_{90} | — | September 18, 2003 | Kitt Peak | Spacewatch | · | 2.2 km | MPC · JPL |
| 592352 | 2014 TU_{90} | — | November 17, 2007 | Kitt Peak | Spacewatch | · | 890 m | MPC · JPL |
| 592353 | 2014 TU_{94} | — | December 18, 2009 | Mount Lemmon | Mount Lemmon Survey | · | 3.0 km | MPC · JPL |
| 592354 | 2014 UF | — | April 21, 2009 | Bergisch Gladbach | W. Bickel | · | 880 m | MPC · JPL |
| 592355 | 2014 UX_{5} | — | September 25, 2014 | Kitt Peak | Spacewatch | · | 730 m | MPC · JPL |
| 592356 | 2014 UJ_{20} | — | October 7, 2007 | Mount Lemmon | Mount Lemmon Survey | · | 800 m | MPC · JPL |
| 592357 | 2014 UK_{22} | — | November 18, 1996 | Kitt Peak | Spacewatch | V | 550 m | MPC · JPL |
| 592358 | 2014 UR_{24} | — | October 15, 2014 | Catalina | CSS | H | 550 m | MPC · JPL |
| 592359 | 2014 UK_{31} | — | April 24, 2009 | Mount Lemmon | Mount Lemmon Survey | V | 540 m | MPC · JPL |
| 592360 | 2014 UG_{34} | — | July 25, 2006 | Mount Lemmon | Mount Lemmon Survey | H | 370 m | MPC · JPL |
| 592361 | 2014 UY_{44} | — | September 22, 2003 | Anderson Mesa | LONEOS | NYS | 760 m | MPC · JPL |
| 592362 | 2014 UE_{45} | — | May 4, 2005 | Mauna Kea | Veillet, C. | PHO | 540 m | MPC · JPL |
| 592363 | 2014 UB_{48} | — | March 15, 2012 | Mount Lemmon | Mount Lemmon Survey | · | 840 m | MPC · JPL |
| 592364 | 2014 UJ_{51} | — | October 24, 2008 | Mount Lemmon | Mount Lemmon Survey | · | 2.3 km | MPC · JPL |
| 592365 | 2014 UH_{74} | — | November 24, 2011 | Haleakala | Pan-STARRS 1 | V | 550 m | MPC · JPL |
| 592366 | 2014 UE_{80} | — | November 13, 2007 | Kitt Peak | Spacewatch | · | 670 m | MPC · JPL |
| 592367 | 2014 US_{92} | — | April 10, 2002 | Socorro | LINEAR | · | 1.4 km | MPC · JPL |
| 592368 | 2014 UF_{94} | — | August 29, 2014 | Haleakala | Pan-STARRS 1 | PHO | 2.4 km | MPC · JPL |
| 592369 | 2014 UH_{95} | — | October 19, 2003 | Apache Point | SDSS Collaboration | · | 720 m | MPC · JPL |
| 592370 | 2014 UM_{98} | — | December 4, 2007 | Kitt Peak | Spacewatch | · | 850 m | MPC · JPL |
| 592371 | 2014 UE_{118} | — | January 30, 2001 | Kitt Peak | Spacewatch | · | 740 m | MPC · JPL |
| 592372 | 2014 UH_{118} | — | October 10, 2010 | Mount Lemmon | Mount Lemmon Survey | · | 850 m | MPC · JPL |
| 592373 | 2014 UM_{122} | — | January 2, 2012 | Kitt Peak | Spacewatch | V | 460 m | MPC · JPL |
| 592374 | 2014 UM_{126} | — | November 8, 2007 | Catalina | CSS | · | 870 m | MPC · JPL |
| 592375 | 2014 UE_{128} | — | September 14, 2007 | Mount Lemmon | Mount Lemmon Survey | · | 1.2 km | MPC · JPL |
| 592376 | 2014 UY_{130} | — | December 19, 2007 | Mount Lemmon | Mount Lemmon Survey | · | 1.1 km | MPC · JPL |
| 592377 | 2014 UL_{132} | — | July 9, 2003 | Kitt Peak | Spacewatch | · | 930 m | MPC · JPL |
| 592378 | 2014 UN_{133} | — | May 4, 2009 | Mount Lemmon | Mount Lemmon Survey | · | 1.0 km | MPC · JPL |
| 592379 | 2014 UB_{137} | — | November 19, 2003 | Kitt Peak | Spacewatch | MAS | 650 m | MPC · JPL |
| 592380 | 2014 UQ_{138} | — | October 29, 2010 | Mount Lemmon | Mount Lemmon Survey | · | 1.2 km | MPC · JPL |
| 592381 | 2014 UY_{143} | — | December 19, 2003 | Kitt Peak | Spacewatch | NYS | 840 m | MPC · JPL |
| 592382 | 2014 UC_{154} | — | April 10, 2013 | Haleakala | Pan-STARRS 1 | · | 860 m | MPC · JPL |
| 592383 | 2014 UY_{173} | — | May 1, 2006 | Kitt Peak | Spacewatch | · | 830 m | MPC · JPL |
| 592384 | 2014 UB_{178} | — | October 10, 2007 | Mount Lemmon | Mount Lemmon Survey | · | 800 m | MPC · JPL |
| 592385 | 2014 UM_{182} | — | September 29, 2003 | Kitt Peak | Spacewatch | · | 940 m | MPC · JPL |
| 592386 | 2014 UU_{194} | — | October 10, 2007 | Mount Lemmon | Mount Lemmon Survey | PHO | 930 m | MPC · JPL |
| 592387 | 2014 UJ_{195} | — | November 19, 2007 | Kitt Peak | Spacewatch | · | 1.1 km | MPC · JPL |
| 592388 | 2014 UB_{206} | — | October 14, 2001 | Anderson Mesa | LONEOS | · | 1.5 km | MPC · JPL |
| 592389 | 2014 UK_{212} | — | October 23, 2004 | Kitt Peak | Spacewatch | · | 1.7 km | MPC · JPL |
| 592390 | 2014 UE_{215} | — | May 11, 2010 | Mount Lemmon | Mount Lemmon Survey | PHO | 800 m | MPC · JPL |
| 592391 | 2014 UP_{223} | — | February 2, 2008 | Catalina | CSS | PHO | 1.1 km | MPC · JPL |
| 592392 | 2014 UL_{246} | — | October 29, 2014 | Haleakala | Pan-STARRS 1 | · | 1.9 km | MPC · JPL |
| 592393 | 2014 UW_{257} | — | October 20, 2014 | Mount Lemmon | Mount Lemmon Survey | · | 1.2 km | MPC · JPL |
| 592394 | 2014 VP_{5} | — | November 24, 2011 | Mount Lemmon | Mount Lemmon Survey | V | 580 m | MPC · JPL |
| 592395 | 2014 VG_{24} | — | January 22, 2012 | Haleakala | Pan-STARRS 1 | · | 1.2 km | MPC · JPL |
| 592396 | 2014 VC_{42} | — | February 21, 2006 | Mount Lemmon | Mount Lemmon Survey | · | 1.3 km | MPC · JPL |
| 592397 | 2014 WT_{9} | — | March 2, 2012 | Mount Lemmon | Mount Lemmon Survey | MAS | 570 m | MPC · JPL |
| 592398 | 2014 WY_{12} | — | March 31, 2001 | Kitt Peak | Spacewatch | · | 970 m | MPC · JPL |
| 592399 | 2014 WC_{18} | — | November 4, 2014 | Mount Lemmon | Mount Lemmon Survey | · | 720 m | MPC · JPL |
| 592400 | 2014 WY_{20} | — | October 24, 2014 | Kitt Peak | Spacewatch | NYS | 730 m | MPC · JPL |

== 592401–592500 ==
back to top

| Designation | | | Discovery | | | Properties | | Ref |
| Permanent | Provisional | Named after | Date | Site | Discoverer(s) | Category | Diam. | Ref |
|---|---|---|---|---|---|---|---|---|
| 592401 | 2014 WA_{21} | — | December 18, 2007 | Mount Lemmon | Mount Lemmon Survey | · | 710 m | MPC · JPL |
| 592402 | 2014 WZ_{24} | — | September 18, 2003 | Palomar | NEAT | MAS | 770 m | MPC · JPL |
| 592403 | 2014 WP_{25} | — | February 9, 2008 | Kitt Peak | Spacewatch | · | 890 m | MPC · JPL |
| 592404 | 2014 WE_{27} | — | October 22, 2014 | Mount Lemmon | Mount Lemmon Survey | · | 770 m | MPC · JPL |
| 592405 | 2014 WB_{39} | — | September 28, 2008 | Mount Lemmon | Mount Lemmon Survey | · | 2.6 km | MPC · JPL |
| 592406 | 2014 WL_{41} | — | September 20, 2014 | Haleakala | Pan-STARRS 1 | · | 1.1 km | MPC · JPL |
| 592407 | 2014 WM_{45} | — | November 17, 2014 | Haleakala | Pan-STARRS 1 | · | 890 m | MPC · JPL |
| 592408 | 2014 WW_{45} | — | October 23, 2003 | Kitt Peak | Spacewatch | V | 520 m | MPC · JPL |
| 592409 | 2014 WN_{46} | — | October 3, 2014 | Mount Lemmon | Mount Lemmon Survey | · | 720 m | MPC · JPL |
| 592410 | 2014 WP_{50} | — | February 12, 2004 | Kitt Peak | Spacewatch | MAS | 840 m | MPC · JPL |
| 592411 | 2014 WN_{59} | — | December 6, 2007 | Mount Lemmon | Mount Lemmon Survey | · | 850 m | MPC · JPL |
| 592412 | 2014 WQ_{60} | — | April 1, 2011 | Mount Lemmon | Mount Lemmon Survey | · | 2.6 km | MPC · JPL |
| 592413 | 2014 WH_{70} | — | April 29, 2003 | Apache Point | SDSS Collaboration | · | 1.6 km | MPC · JPL |
| 592414 | 2014 WG_{74} | — | September 24, 2014 | Mount Lemmon | Mount Lemmon Survey | · | 940 m | MPC · JPL |
| 592415 | 2014 WR_{91} | — | June 20, 2010 | Mount Lemmon | Mount Lemmon Survey | · | 980 m | MPC · JPL |
| 592416 | 2014 WE_{97} | — | April 15, 2013 | Haleakala | Pan-STARRS 1 | V | 520 m | MPC · JPL |
| 592417 | 2014 WJ_{97} | — | June 4, 2013 | Kitt Peak | Spacewatch | · | 910 m | MPC · JPL |
| 592418 | 2014 WF_{101} | — | March 14, 2012 | Mount Lemmon | Mount Lemmon Survey | · | 1.2 km | MPC · JPL |
| 592419 | 2014 WM_{108} | — | December 19, 2007 | Mount Lemmon | Mount Lemmon Survey | · | 1.2 km | MPC · JPL |
| 592420 | 2014 WH_{118} | — | January 14, 2008 | Kitt Peak | Spacewatch | · | 990 m | MPC · JPL |
| 592421 | 2014 WZ_{145} | — | October 31, 2014 | Mount Lemmon | Mount Lemmon Survey | · | 880 m | MPC · JPL |
| 592422 | 2014 WW_{150} | — | April 16, 2009 | Kitt Peak | Spacewatch | · | 910 m | MPC · JPL |
| 592423 | 2014 WM_{151} | — | September 28, 2003 | Kitt Peak | Spacewatch | · | 710 m | MPC · JPL |
| 592424 | 2014 WE_{152} | — | October 20, 2007 | Mount Lemmon | Mount Lemmon Survey | · | 670 m | MPC · JPL |
| 592425 | 2014 WH_{154} | — | December 31, 2007 | Kitt Peak | Spacewatch | · | 730 m | MPC · JPL |
| 592426 | 2014 WE_{155} | — | March 16, 2012 | Haleakala | Pan-STARRS 1 | · | 930 m | MPC · JPL |
| 592427 | 2014 WG_{170} | — | November 27, 2011 | Mount Lemmon | Mount Lemmon Survey | · | 810 m | MPC · JPL |
| 592428 | 2014 WN_{182} | — | October 27, 2009 | Kitt Peak | Spacewatch | · | 1.7 km | MPC · JPL |
| 592429 | 2014 WQ_{185} | — | February 26, 2004 | Kitt Peak | Deep Ecliptic Survey | PHO | 990 m | MPC · JPL |
| 592430 | 2014 WA_{196} | — | August 10, 2010 | Kitt Peak | Spacewatch | · | 940 m | MPC · JPL |
| 592431 | 2014 WY_{196} | — | October 31, 2014 | Mount Lemmon | Mount Lemmon Survey | · | 930 m | MPC · JPL |
| 592432 | 2014 WE_{205} | — | October 14, 2014 | Mount Lemmon | Mount Lemmon Survey | · | 710 m | MPC · JPL |
| 592433 | 2014 WP_{207} | — | October 21, 2014 | Mount Lemmon | Mount Lemmon Survey | · | 1.1 km | MPC · JPL |
| 592434 | 2014 WS_{210} | — | July 25, 2003 | Palomar | NEAT | · | 860 m | MPC · JPL |
| 592435 | 2014 WV_{217} | — | November 20, 2009 | Mount Lemmon | Mount Lemmon Survey | · | 1.7 km | MPC · JPL |
| 592436 | 2014 WC_{224} | — | August 19, 2006 | Kitt Peak | Spacewatch | · | 1.1 km | MPC · JPL |
| 592437 | 2014 WS_{228} | — | October 13, 2006 | Kitt Peak | Spacewatch | 3:2 | 5.8 km | MPC · JPL |
| 592438 | 2014 WV_{230} | — | March 2, 2011 | Vail-Jarnac | Glinos, T. | · | 1.2 km | MPC · JPL |
| 592439 | 2014 WZ_{231} | — | March 9, 2005 | Mount Lemmon | Mount Lemmon Survey | · | 2.0 km | MPC · JPL |
| 592440 | 2014 WQ_{234} | — | August 22, 2003 | Palomar | NEAT | · | 920 m | MPC · JPL |
| 592441 | 2014 WY_{245} | — | July 31, 2014 | Haleakala | Pan-STARRS 1 | · | 750 m | MPC · JPL |
| 592442 | 2014 WK_{248} | — | December 25, 2011 | Kitt Peak | Spacewatch | · | 620 m | MPC · JPL |
| 592443 | 2014 WG_{257} | — | February 3, 2012 | Haleakala | Pan-STARRS 1 | V | 560 m | MPC · JPL |
| 592444 | 2014 WG_{260} | — | May 31, 2012 | Mount Lemmon | Mount Lemmon Survey | · | 1.2 km | MPC · JPL |
| 592445 | 2014 WO_{260} | — | May 7, 2008 | Kitt Peak | Spacewatch | · | 830 m | MPC · JPL |
| 592446 | 2014 WA_{262} | — | November 21, 2014 | Haleakala | Pan-STARRS 1 | V | 510 m | MPC · JPL |
| 592447 | 2014 WU_{262} | — | October 24, 2003 | Apache Point | SDSS Collaboration | V | 580 m | MPC · JPL |
| 592448 | 2014 WZ_{272} | — | November 21, 2014 | Haleakala | Pan-STARRS 1 | PHO | 800 m | MPC · JPL |
| 592449 | 2014 WW_{273} | — | January 30, 2008 | Eskridge | G. Hug | · | 900 m | MPC · JPL |
| 592450 | 2014 WU_{301} | — | August 20, 2014 | Haleakala | Pan-STARRS 1 | (1338) (FLO) | 610 m | MPC · JPL |
| 592451 | 2014 WY_{307} | — | November 22, 2014 | Mount Lemmon | Mount Lemmon Survey | PHO | 570 m | MPC · JPL |
| 592452 | 2014 WH_{308} | — | March 13, 2008 | Kitt Peak | Spacewatch | · | 860 m | MPC · JPL |
| 592453 | 2014 WV_{321} | — | December 27, 2011 | Kitt Peak | Spacewatch | · | 770 m | MPC · JPL |
| 592454 | 2014 WE_{329} | — | March 9, 2005 | Mount Lemmon | Mount Lemmon Survey | · | 610 m | MPC · JPL |
| 592455 | 2014 WH_{330} | — | September 5, 2003 | Siding Spring | G. J. Garradd, R. H. McNaught | V | 550 m | MPC · JPL |
| 592456 | 2014 WV_{334} | — | February 14, 2012 | Haleakala | Pan-STARRS 1 | · | 940 m | MPC · JPL |
| 592457 | 2014 WW_{346} | — | October 30, 2014 | Mount Lemmon | Mount Lemmon Survey | · | 830 m | MPC · JPL |
| 592458 | 2014 WJ_{349} | — | November 22, 2014 | Haleakala | Pan-STARRS 1 | V | 500 m | MPC · JPL |
| 592459 | 2014 WH_{350} | — | March 30, 2008 | Kitt Peak | Spacewatch | HNS | 860 m | MPC · JPL |
| 592460 | 2014 WW_{350} | — | October 26, 2014 | Haleakala | Pan-STARRS 1 | · | 1.6 km | MPC · JPL |
| 592461 | 2014 WX_{356} | — | January 19, 2012 | Haleakala | Pan-STARRS 1 | · | 940 m | MPC · JPL |
| 592462 | 2014 WB_{370} | — | January 15, 2008 | Catalina | CSS | PHO | 970 m | MPC · JPL |
| 592463 | 2014 WJ_{373} | — | November 11, 2007 | Mount Lemmon | Mount Lemmon Survey | · | 1.2 km | MPC · JPL |
| 592464 | 2014 WH_{378} | — | November 11, 2007 | Mount Lemmon | Mount Lemmon Survey | PHO | 850 m | MPC · JPL |
| 592465 | 2014 WM_{380} | — | September 10, 2010 | Kitt Peak | Spacewatch | · | 1.0 km | MPC · JPL |
| 592466 | 2014 WF_{401} | — | October 23, 2014 | Kitt Peak | Spacewatch | NYS | 810 m | MPC · JPL |
| 592467 | 2014 WL_{404} | — | October 11, 2010 | Mount Lemmon | Mount Lemmon Survey | · | 1.1 km | MPC · JPL |
| 592468 | 2014 WT_{406} | — | March 11, 2005 | Kitt Peak | Deep Ecliptic Survey | · | 1.6 km | MPC · JPL |
| 592469 | 2014 WK_{407} | — | March 16, 2012 | Haleakala | Pan-STARRS 1 | V | 600 m | MPC · JPL |
| 592470 | 2014 WV_{408} | — | December 2, 2010 | Kitt Peak | Spacewatch | · | 840 m | MPC · JPL |
| 592471 | 2014 WY_{408} | — | March 27, 2008 | Mount Lemmon | Mount Lemmon Survey | · | 740 m | MPC · JPL |
| 592472 | 2014 WK_{415} | — | July 23, 2006 | Mount Lemmon | Mount Lemmon Survey | · | 1.3 km | MPC · JPL |
| 592473 | 2014 WF_{420} | — | May 11, 2006 | Mount Lemmon | Mount Lemmon Survey | · | 1.3 km | MPC · JPL |
| 592474 | 2014 WV_{425} | — | November 22, 2014 | Haleakala | Pan-STARRS 1 | PHO | 950 m | MPC · JPL |
| 592475 | 2014 WY_{428} | — | November 26, 2014 | Haleakala | Pan-STARRS 1 | · | 1.4 km | MPC · JPL |
| 592476 | 2014 WC_{431} | — | October 9, 2008 | Mount Lemmon | Mount Lemmon Survey | · | 2.5 km | MPC · JPL |
| 592477 | 2014 WE_{431} | — | February 28, 2008 | Kitt Peak | Spacewatch | · | 1.1 km | MPC · JPL |
| 592478 | 2014 WA_{448} | — | November 11, 2007 | Mount Lemmon | Mount Lemmon Survey | V | 530 m | MPC · JPL |
| 592479 | 2014 WY_{466} | — | November 17, 1999 | Kitt Peak | Spacewatch | NYS | 800 m | MPC · JPL |
| 592480 | 2014 WW_{470} | — | November 18, 2007 | Mount Lemmon | Mount Lemmon Survey | · | 650 m | MPC · JPL |
| 592481 | 2014 WD_{475} | — | July 13, 2013 | Haleakala | Pan-STARRS 1 | · | 1.0 km | MPC · JPL |
| 592482 | 2014 WB_{476} | — | December 14, 2003 | Kitt Peak | Spacewatch | ERI | 990 m | MPC · JPL |
| 592483 | 2014 WT_{485} | — | October 25, 2014 | Mount Lemmon | Mount Lemmon Survey | · | 770 m | MPC · JPL |
| 592484 | 2014 WZ_{498} | — | August 28, 2003 | Palomar | NEAT | · | 1.1 km | MPC · JPL |
| 592485 | 2014 WP_{500} | — | December 3, 2007 | Kitt Peak | Spacewatch | ERI | 1.2 km | MPC · JPL |
| 592486 | 2014 WR_{504} | — | February 16, 2012 | Haleakala | Pan-STARRS 1 | V | 570 m | MPC · JPL |
| 592487 | 2014 WF_{509} | — | November 20, 2014 | Haleakala | Pan-STARRS 1 | cubewano (hot) | 297 km | MPC · JPL |
| 592488 | 2014 WT_{515} | — | November 26, 2014 | Mount Lemmon | Mount Lemmon Survey | PHO | 980 m | MPC · JPL |
| 592489 | 2014 WM_{523} | — | January 27, 2004 | Kitt Peak | Spacewatch | · | 970 m | MPC · JPL |
| 592490 | 2014 WC_{524} | — | August 9, 2013 | Haleakala | Pan-STARRS 1 | · | 920 m | MPC · JPL |
| 592491 | 2014 WY_{527} | — | November 21, 2014 | Haleakala | Pan-STARRS 1 | · | 1.2 km | MPC · JPL |
| 592492 | 2014 WM_{535} | — | November 1, 2010 | Mount Lemmon | Mount Lemmon Survey | V | 630 m | MPC · JPL |
| 592493 | 2014 WL_{567} | — | November 16, 2014 | Mount Lemmon | Mount Lemmon Survey | · | 980 m | MPC · JPL |
| 592494 | 2014 WZ_{572} | — | November 26, 2014 | Haleakala | Pan-STARRS 1 | · | 920 m | MPC · JPL |
| 592495 | 2014 WN_{573} | — | November 17, 2014 | Haleakala | Pan-STARRS 1 | · | 860 m | MPC · JPL |
| 592496 | 2014 WO_{575} | — | November 26, 2014 | Haleakala | Pan-STARRS 1 | · | 870 m | MPC · JPL |
| 592497 | 2014 XT_{8} | — | November 14, 2007 | Mount Lemmon | Mount Lemmon Survey | · | 810 m | MPC · JPL |
| 592498 | 2014 XC_{18} | — | October 28, 2010 | Mount Lemmon | Mount Lemmon Survey | · | 1.3 km | MPC · JPL |
| 592499 | 2014 XR_{21} | — | November 5, 2007 | Kitt Peak | Spacewatch | · | 800 m | MPC · JPL |
| 592500 | 2014 XJ_{23} | — | January 11, 2008 | Kitt Peak | Spacewatch | · | 790 m | MPC · JPL |

== 592501–592600 ==
back to top

| Designation | | | Discovery | | | Properties | | Ref |
| Permanent | Provisional | Named after | Date | Site | Discoverer(s) | Category | Diam. | Ref |
|---|---|---|---|---|---|---|---|---|
| 592501 | 2014 XW_{27} | — | February 15, 2005 | La Silla | A. Boattini | · | 1.2 km | MPC · JPL |
| 592502 | 2014 XB_{31} | — | February 21, 2003 | Palomar | NEAT | · | 1.2 km | MPC · JPL |
| 592503 | 2014 XO_{50} | — | December 11, 2014 | Mount Lemmon | Mount Lemmon Survey | · | 1 km | MPC · JPL |
| 592504 | 2014 YX_{5} | — | November 5, 2010 | Mount Lemmon | Mount Lemmon Survey | · | 1.1 km | MPC · JPL |
| 592505 | 2014 YE_{10} | — | November 26, 2014 | Haleakala | Pan-STARRS 1 | · | 1.2 km | MPC · JPL |
| 592506 | 2014 YH_{10} | — | October 20, 2006 | Mount Lemmon | Mount Lemmon Survey | V | 710 m | MPC · JPL |
| 592507 | 2014 YV_{10} | — | February 3, 2008 | Kitt Peak | Spacewatch | MAS | 750 m | MPC · JPL |
| 592508 | 2014 YT_{23} | — | February 26, 2011 | Catalina | CSS | · | 1.4 km | MPC · JPL |
| 592509 | 2014 YA_{35} | — | October 7, 2004 | Kitt Peak | Spacewatch | · | 2.5 km | MPC · JPL |
| 592510 | 2014 YF_{36} | — | October 2, 2006 | Mount Lemmon | Mount Lemmon Survey | · | 840 m | MPC · JPL |
| 592511 | 2014 YS_{39} | — | November 21, 2003 | Kitt Peak | Spacewatch | · | 1.0 km | MPC · JPL |
| 592512 | 2014 YF_{53} | — | December 24, 2005 | Kitt Peak | Spacewatch | · | 1.5 km | MPC · JPL |
| 592513 | 2014 YB_{54} | — | December 26, 2014 | Haleakala | Pan-STARRS 1 | · | 910 m | MPC · JPL |
| 592514 | 2014 YL_{55} | — | February 26, 2004 | Kitt Peak | Deep Ecliptic Survey | · | 1.0 km | MPC · JPL |
| 592515 | 2014 YH_{59} | — | December 21, 2014 | Haleakala | Pan-STARRS 1 | · | 1.6 km | MPC · JPL |
| 592516 | 2014 YR_{63} | — | November 29, 2005 | Palomar | NEAT | · | 1.3 km | MPC · JPL |
| 592517 | 2014 YQ_{78} | — | December 21, 2014 | Haleakala | Pan-STARRS 1 | · | 1.5 km | MPC · JPL |
| 592518 | 2015 AT_{7} | — | September 27, 2006 | Mount Lemmon | Mount Lemmon Survey | PHO | 880 m | MPC · JPL |
| 592519 | 2015 AM_{16} | — | January 11, 2015 | Haleakala | Pan-STARRS 1 | · | 1.1 km | MPC · JPL |
| 592520 | 2015 AD_{26} | — | April 8, 2002 | Kitt Peak | Spacewatch | · | 2.2 km | MPC · JPL |
| 592521 | 2015 AW_{29} | — | October 27, 2005 | Kitt Peak | Spacewatch | · | 1.2 km | MPC · JPL |
| 592522 | 2015 AU_{43} | — | December 26, 2014 | Haleakala | Pan-STARRS 1 | H | 350 m | MPC · JPL |
| 592523 | 2015 AU_{48} | — | January 12, 2015 | Haleakala | Pan-STARRS 1 | L5 | 8.1 km | MPC · JPL |
| 592524 | 2015 AW_{49} | — | December 30, 2008 | Mount Lemmon | Mount Lemmon Survey | 3:2 | 5.8 km | MPC · JPL |
| 592525 | 2015 AD_{50} | — | October 29, 2008 | Mount Lemmon | Mount Lemmon Survey | · | 2.2 km | MPC · JPL |
| 592526 | 2015 AV_{56} | — | December 14, 2010 | Mount Lemmon | Mount Lemmon Survey | · | 680 m | MPC · JPL |
| 592527 | 2015 AS_{57} | — | December 15, 2006 | Kitt Peak | Spacewatch | 3:2 | 4.9 km | MPC · JPL |
| 592528 | 2015 AZ_{64} | — | June 23, 2009 | Mount Lemmon | Mount Lemmon Survey | · | 1.3 km | MPC · JPL |
| 592529 | 2015 AF_{72} | — | October 18, 2006 | Kitt Peak | Spacewatch | NYS | 660 m | MPC · JPL |
| 592530 | 2015 AT_{74} | — | March 12, 2008 | Kitt Peak | Spacewatch | · | 840 m | MPC · JPL |
| 592531 | 2015 AY_{74} | — | January 8, 2002 | Kitt Peak | Spacewatch | · | 1.5 km | MPC · JPL |
| 592532 | 2015 AF_{75} | — | September 10, 2013 | Haleakala | Pan-STARRS 1 | · | 1.3 km | MPC · JPL |
| 592533 | 2015 AM_{76} | — | December 2, 2010 | Mount Lemmon | Mount Lemmon Survey | V | 680 m | MPC · JPL |
| 592534 | 2015 AH_{88} | — | October 11, 2010 | Catalina | CSS | · | 990 m | MPC · JPL |
| 592535 | 2015 AP_{92} | — | February 13, 2011 | Mount Lemmon | Mount Lemmon Survey | EUN | 820 m | MPC · JPL |
| 592536 | 2015 AG_{95} | — | November 22, 2014 | Haleakala | Pan-STARRS 1 | · | 2.8 km | MPC · JPL |
| 592537 | 2015 AP_{99} | — | February 13, 2011 | Mount Lemmon | Mount Lemmon Survey | · | 1.1 km | MPC · JPL |
| 592538 | 2015 AR_{111} | — | December 21, 2014 | Haleakala | Pan-STARRS 1 | · | 1.4 km | MPC · JPL |
| 592539 | 2015 AK_{120} | — | January 12, 2011 | Mount Lemmon | Mount Lemmon Survey | · | 910 m | MPC · JPL |
| 592540 | 2015 AL_{120} | — | February 10, 2011 | Mount Lemmon | Mount Lemmon Survey | · | 1.0 km | MPC · JPL |
| 592541 | 2015 AT_{141} | — | October 4, 2006 | Mount Lemmon | Mount Lemmon Survey | · | 810 m | MPC · JPL |
| 592542 | 2015 AW_{145} | — | March 8, 2008 | Mount Lemmon | Mount Lemmon Survey | · | 1.2 km | MPC · JPL |
| 592543 | 2015 AR_{150} | — | February 13, 2007 | Mount Lemmon | Mount Lemmon Survey | · | 1.1 km | MPC · JPL |
| 592544 | 2015 AM_{158} | — | November 20, 2006 | Kitt Peak | Spacewatch | · | 1.2 km | MPC · JPL |
| 592545 | 2015 AL_{162} | — | December 21, 2014 | Mount Lemmon | Mount Lemmon Survey | · | 1.0 km | MPC · JPL |
| 592546 | 2015 AJ_{167} | — | February 28, 2012 | Haleakala | Pan-STARRS 1 | · | 1.4 km | MPC · JPL |
| 592547 | 2015 AF_{173} | — | September 25, 2009 | Mount Lemmon | Mount Lemmon Survey | (5) | 860 m | MPC · JPL |
| 592548 | 2015 AM_{188} | — | December 21, 2014 | Haleakala | Pan-STARRS 1 | · | 820 m | MPC · JPL |
| 592549 | 2015 AG_{189} | — | May 22, 2001 | Eskridge | G. Hug | · | 1.8 km | MPC · JPL |
| 592550 | 2015 AJ_{211} | — | December 16, 2014 | Haleakala | Pan-STARRS 1 | · | 930 m | MPC · JPL |
| 592551 | 2015 AR_{218} | — | October 9, 2010 | Mount Lemmon | Mount Lemmon Survey | PHO | 860 m | MPC · JPL |
| 592552 | 2015 AH_{219} | — | March 26, 2007 | Kitt Peak | Spacewatch | · | 1.1 km | MPC · JPL |
| 592553 | 2015 AV_{229} | — | February 13, 2011 | Kitt Peak | Spacewatch | · | 870 m | MPC · JPL |
| 592554 | 2015 AW_{230} | — | January 15, 2015 | Haleakala | Pan-STARRS 1 | · | 1.1 km | MPC · JPL |
| 592555 | 2015 AG_{242} | — | May 13, 2007 | Mount Lemmon | Mount Lemmon Survey | · | 1.4 km | MPC · JPL |
| 592556 | 2015 AE_{243} | — | December 5, 2005 | Mount Lemmon | Mount Lemmon Survey | · | 2.4 km | MPC · JPL |
| 592557 | 2015 AF_{243} | — | November 10, 2013 | Mount Lemmon | Mount Lemmon Survey | · | 1.6 km | MPC · JPL |
| 592558 | 2015 AT_{247} | — | January 14, 2011 | Kitt Peak | Spacewatch | · | 940 m | MPC · JPL |
| 592559 | 2015 AX_{249} | — | February 16, 2005 | La Silla | A. Boattini | · | 690 m | MPC · JPL |
| 592560 | 2015 AU_{254} | — | March 1, 2011 | Charleston | R. Holmes | MAR | 920 m | MPC · JPL |
| 592561 | 2015 AH_{257} | — | December 21, 2014 | Haleakala | Pan-STARRS 1 | · | 1.1 km | MPC · JPL |
| 592562 | 2015 AE_{260} | — | January 27, 2007 | Mount Lemmon | Mount Lemmon Survey | · | 1.3 km | MPC · JPL |
| 592563 | 2015 AL_{270} | — | January 23, 2011 | Mount Lemmon | Mount Lemmon Survey | · | 1.0 km | MPC · JPL |
| 592564 | 2015 AT_{284} | — | April 1, 2003 | Apache Point | SDSS Collaboration | · | 2.1 km | MPC · JPL |
| 592565 | 2015 AK_{289} | — | September 3, 2013 | Calar Alto | F. Hormuth | · | 880 m | MPC · JPL |
| 592566 | 2015 AF_{290} | — | March 9, 2007 | Mount Lemmon | Mount Lemmon Survey | · | 970 m | MPC · JPL |
| 592567 | 2015 AV_{291} | — | August 29, 2006 | Kitt Peak | Spacewatch | NYS | 950 m | MPC · JPL |
| 592568 | 2015 AO_{299} | — | January 13, 2015 | Haleakala | Pan-STARRS 1 | · | 940 m | MPC · JPL |
| 592569 | 2015 AP_{303} | — | March 11, 2011 | Catalina | CSS | · | 1.2 km | MPC · JPL |
| 592570 | 2015 BH_{2} | — | October 2, 2006 | Mount Lemmon | Mount Lemmon Survey | · | 1.1 km | MPC · JPL |
| 592571 | 2015 BB_{16} | — | November 10, 2006 | Kitt Peak | Spacewatch | · | 1.2 km | MPC · JPL |
| 592572 | 2015 BV_{16} | — | January 16, 2015 | Mount Lemmon | Mount Lemmon Survey | PHO | 770 m | MPC · JPL |
| 592573 | 2015 BT_{19} | — | February 27, 2007 | Kitt Peak | Spacewatch | · | 1.3 km | MPC · JPL |
| 592574 | 2015 BU_{19} | — | December 26, 2014 | Haleakala | Pan-STARRS 1 | · | 1.1 km | MPC · JPL |
| 592575 | 2015 BC_{20} | — | March 12, 2011 | Mount Lemmon | Mount Lemmon Survey | · | 870 m | MPC · JPL |
| 592576 | 2015 BH_{23} | — | October 3, 2013 | Mount Lemmon | Mount Lemmon Survey | · | 1.2 km | MPC · JPL |
| 592577 | 2015 BJ_{26} | — | January 12, 2000 | Kitt Peak | Spacewatch | · | 1.4 km | MPC · JPL |
| 592578 | 2015 BU_{28} | — | January 27, 2007 | Kitt Peak | Spacewatch | (5) | 1.1 km | MPC · JPL |
| 592579 | 2015 BD_{31} | — | August 26, 2012 | Haleakala | Pan-STARRS 1 | · | 1.7 km | MPC · JPL |
| 592580 | 2015 BW_{34} | — | March 6, 2011 | Mount Lemmon | Mount Lemmon Survey | · | 1.1 km | MPC · JPL |
| 592581 | 2015 BG_{35} | — | January 16, 2015 | Haleakala | Pan-STARRS 1 | · | 1.3 km | MPC · JPL |
| 592582 | 2015 BG_{36} | — | January 16, 2015 | Haleakala | Pan-STARRS 1 | EUN | 1.0 km | MPC · JPL |
| 592583 | 2015 BQ_{45} | — | August 21, 2006 | Kitt Peak | Spacewatch | · | 850 m | MPC · JPL |
| 592584 | 2015 BN_{48} | — | December 12, 2014 | Haleakala | Pan-STARRS 1 | · | 820 m | MPC · JPL |
| 592585 | 2015 BA_{51} | — | April 28, 2012 | Mount Lemmon | Mount Lemmon Survey | KON | 1.8 km | MPC · JPL |
| 592586 | 2015 BN_{51} | — | January 8, 2011 | Mount Lemmon | Mount Lemmon Survey | · | 1.3 km | MPC · JPL |
| 592587 | 2015 BN_{65} | — | January 17, 2015 | Haleakala | Pan-STARRS 1 | · | 780 m | MPC · JPL |
| 592588 | 2015 BA_{69} | — | October 12, 2005 | Kitt Peak | Spacewatch | · | 930 m | MPC · JPL |
| 592589 | 2015 BQ_{70} | — | July 2, 2008 | Kitt Peak | Spacewatch | EUN | 1.2 km | MPC · JPL |
| 592590 | 2015 BD_{74} | — | February 10, 2011 | Mount Lemmon | Mount Lemmon Survey | · | 960 m | MPC · JPL |
| 592591 | 2015 BV_{74} | — | January 17, 2015 | Haleakala | Pan-STARRS 1 | (5) | 880 m | MPC · JPL |
| 592592 | 2015 BC_{77} | — | December 6, 2005 | Kitt Peak | Spacewatch | · | 1.0 km | MPC · JPL |
| 592593 | 2015 BN_{83} | — | September 25, 2006 | Kitt Peak | Spacewatch | · | 1.1 km | MPC · JPL |
| 592594 | 2015 BG_{85} | — | March 14, 2011 | Mount Lemmon | Mount Lemmon Survey | · | 1.1 km | MPC · JPL |
| 592595 | 2015 BT_{90} | — | January 18, 2015 | Mount Lemmon | Mount Lemmon Survey | · | 1.1 km | MPC · JPL |
| 592596 | 2015 BZ_{95} | — | November 4, 2013 | Mount Lemmon | Mount Lemmon Survey | 3:2 | 4.0 km | MPC · JPL |
| 592597 | 2015 BW_{100} | — | January 16, 2015 | Mount Lemmon | Mount Lemmon Survey | H | 390 m | MPC · JPL |
| 592598 | 2015 BN_{103} | — | December 3, 2013 | Haleakala | Pan-STARRS 1 | · | 1.1 km | MPC · JPL |
| 592599 | 2015 BG_{105} | — | January 16, 2015 | Haleakala | Pan-STARRS 1 | · | 820 m | MPC · JPL |
| 592600 | 2015 BK_{116} | — | January 27, 2011 | Mount Lemmon | Mount Lemmon Survey | · | 1.3 km | MPC · JPL |

== 592601–592700 ==
back to top

| Designation | | | Discovery | | | Properties | | Ref |
| Permanent | Provisional | Named after | Date | Site | Discoverer(s) | Category | Diam. | Ref |
|---|---|---|---|---|---|---|---|---|
| 592601 | 2015 BA_{128} | — | August 23, 2004 | Kitt Peak | Spacewatch | · | 1.2 km | MPC · JPL |
| 592602 | 2015 BN_{129} | — | July 18, 2012 | Catalina | CSS | JUN | 880 m | MPC · JPL |
| 592603 | 2015 BU_{129} | — | January 17, 2015 | Haleakala | Pan-STARRS 1 | · | 960 m | MPC · JPL |
| 592604 | 2015 BJ_{141} | — | February 29, 2008 | Kitt Peak | Spacewatch | · | 1.1 km | MPC · JPL |
| 592605 | 2015 BW_{142} | — | January 17, 2015 | Haleakala | Pan-STARRS 1 | · | 1.7 km | MPC · JPL |
| 592606 | 2015 BH_{150} | — | March 30, 2011 | Mount Lemmon | Mount Lemmon Survey | · | 1.1 km | MPC · JPL |
| 592607 | 2015 BJ_{151} | — | January 17, 2015 | Haleakala | Pan-STARRS 1 | · | 1.1 km | MPC · JPL |
| 592608 | 2015 BQ_{154} | — | April 1, 2003 | Apache Point | SDSS Collaboration | · | 1.5 km | MPC · JPL |
| 592609 | 2015 BB_{162} | — | March 23, 2003 | Apache Point | SDSS Collaboration | · | 1.1 km | MPC · JPL |
| 592610 | 2015 BE_{168} | — | August 8, 2013 | Kitt Peak | Spacewatch | · | 1.3 km | MPC · JPL |
| 592611 | 2015 BW_{170} | — | January 17, 2015 | Haleakala | Pan-STARRS 1 | · | 1.1 km | MPC · JPL |
| 592612 | 2015 BZ_{180} | — | January 31, 2006 | Kitt Peak | Spacewatch | · | 2.0 km | MPC · JPL |
| 592613 | 2015 BM_{181} | — | January 17, 2015 | Haleakala | Pan-STARRS 1 | MAR | 760 m | MPC · JPL |
| 592614 | 2015 BF_{185} | — | January 17, 2015 | Haleakala | Pan-STARRS 1 | · | 1.3 km | MPC · JPL |
| 592615 | 2015 BS_{189} | — | October 30, 2013 | Haleakala | Pan-STARRS 1 | · | 1.1 km | MPC · JPL |
| 592616 | 2015 BE_{190} | — | September 14, 2013 | Haleakala | Pan-STARRS 1 | · | 1.3 km | MPC · JPL |
| 592617 | 2015 BU_{193} | — | January 17, 2015 | Haleakala | Pan-STARRS 1 | · | 1.0 km | MPC · JPL |
| 592618 | 2015 BC_{199} | — | February 6, 2002 | Kitt Peak | Deep Ecliptic Survey | · | 1.3 km | MPC · JPL |
| 592619 | 2015 BQ_{200} | — | December 22, 2005 | Kitt Peak | Spacewatch | ADE | 1.6 km | MPC · JPL |
| 592620 | 2015 BS_{204} | — | January 27, 2007 | Mount Lemmon | Mount Lemmon Survey | · | 1.1 km | MPC · JPL |
| 592621 | 2015 BL_{206} | — | November 14, 2010 | Catalina | CSS | · | 1.5 km | MPC · JPL |
| 592622 | 2015 BD_{214} | — | January 23, 2006 | Kitt Peak | Spacewatch | · | 1.7 km | MPC · JPL |
| 592623 | 2015 BE_{220} | — | January 14, 2011 | Mount Lemmon | Mount Lemmon Survey | · | 880 m | MPC · JPL |
| 592624 | 2015 BT_{229} | — | February 17, 2007 | Kitt Peak | Spacewatch | · | 1.2 km | MPC · JPL |
| 592625 | 2015 BK_{230} | — | May 12, 2012 | Mount Lemmon | Mount Lemmon Survey | · | 950 m | MPC · JPL |
| 592626 | 2015 BZ_{231} | — | August 15, 2013 | Haleakala | Pan-STARRS 1 | · | 1.3 km | MPC · JPL |
| 592627 | 2015 BN_{232} | — | February 1, 2011 | Bisei | BATTeRS | · | 1.0 km | MPC · JPL |
| 592628 | 2015 BO_{232} | — | December 21, 2014 | Haleakala | Pan-STARRS 1 | · | 970 m | MPC · JPL |
| 592629 | 2015 BG_{235} | — | January 18, 2015 | Haleakala | Pan-STARRS 1 | · | 1.0 km | MPC · JPL |
| 592630 | 2015 BT_{235} | — | February 29, 2008 | Mount Lemmon | Mount Lemmon Survey | 3:2 | 6.5 km | MPC · JPL |
| 592631 | 2015 BQ_{237} | — | October 26, 2013 | Mount Lemmon | Mount Lemmon Survey | BRG | 1.2 km | MPC · JPL |
| 592632 | 2015 BY_{237} | — | July 14, 2013 | Haleakala | Pan-STARRS 1 | · | 930 m | MPC · JPL |
| 592633 | 2015 BM_{255} | — | January 28, 2011 | Kitt Peak | Spacewatch | · | 1.0 km | MPC · JPL |
| 592634 | 2015 BP_{257} | — | February 12, 2011 | Mount Lemmon | Mount Lemmon Survey | · | 870 m | MPC · JPL |
| 592635 | 2015 BF_{263} | — | June 2, 2011 | Bergisch Gladbach | W. Bickel | · | 1.9 km | MPC · JPL |
| 592636 | 2015 BO_{265} | — | January 28, 2007 | Mount Lemmon | Mount Lemmon Survey | · | 1.1 km | MPC · JPL |
| 592637 | 2015 BJ_{276} | — | November 6, 2005 | Mount Lemmon | Mount Lemmon Survey | · | 1.5 km | MPC · JPL |
| 592638 | 2015 BE_{280} | — | October 24, 2013 | Mount Lemmon | Mount Lemmon Survey | · | 1.1 km | MPC · JPL |
| 592639 | 2015 BS_{281} | — | January 30, 2011 | Haleakala | Pan-STARRS 1 | · | 1.1 km | MPC · JPL |
| 592640 | 2015 BE_{291} | — | November 9, 2013 | Haleakala | Pan-STARRS 1 | EUN | 960 m | MPC · JPL |
| 592641 | 2015 BJ_{293} | — | May 27, 2012 | Mount Lemmon | Mount Lemmon Survey | · | 940 m | MPC · JPL |
| 592642 | 2015 BC_{294} | — | February 25, 2011 | Catalina | CSS | · | 1.4 km | MPC · JPL |
| 592643 | 2015 BE_{297} | — | January 9, 2006 | Kitt Peak | Spacewatch | EUN | 1.3 km | MPC · JPL |
| 592644 | 2015 BG_{297} | — | January 19, 2015 | Haleakala | Pan-STARRS 1 | · | 890 m | MPC · JPL |
| 592645 | 2015 BU_{297} | — | March 9, 2002 | Palomar | NEAT | · | 2.0 km | MPC · JPL |
| 592646 | 2015 BV_{297} | — | January 19, 2015 | Haleakala | Pan-STARRS 1 | HNS | 1 km | MPC · JPL |
| 592647 | 2015 BC_{299} | — | March 10, 2002 | Kitt Peak | Spacewatch | · | 1.1 km | MPC · JPL |
| 592648 | 2015 BQ_{305} | — | September 17, 2006 | Kitt Peak | Spacewatch | · | 1.1 km | MPC · JPL |
| 592649 | 2015 BQ_{306} | — | September 19, 2009 | Mount Lemmon | Mount Lemmon Survey | EUN | 1.1 km | MPC · JPL |
| 592650 | 2015 BQ_{307} | — | December 26, 2014 | Haleakala | Pan-STARRS 1 | MAR | 830 m | MPC · JPL |
| 592651 | 2015 BZ_{308} | — | January 17, 2004 | Palomar | NEAT | PHO | 860 m | MPC · JPL |
| 592652 | 2015 BJ_{312} | — | January 2, 2012 | Mount Lemmon | Mount Lemmon Survey | V | 530 m | MPC · JPL |
| 592653 | 2015 BX_{314} | — | April 6, 2011 | Mount Lemmon | Mount Lemmon Survey | · | 1.1 km | MPC · JPL |
| 592654 | 2015 BO_{316} | — | January 17, 2015 | Haleakala | Pan-STARRS 1 | · | 970 m | MPC · JPL |
| 592655 | 2015 BC_{319} | — | September 26, 2006 | Mount Lemmon | Mount Lemmon Survey | NYS | 810 m | MPC · JPL |
| 592656 | 2015 BW_{319} | — | April 15, 2007 | Kitt Peak | Spacewatch | · | 1.5 km | MPC · JPL |
| 592657 | 2015 BO_{323} | — | September 19, 1998 | Apache Point | SDSS Collaboration | · | 750 m | MPC · JPL |
| 592658 | 2015 BW_{325} | — | October 14, 2009 | Mount Lemmon | Mount Lemmon Survey | · | 1.2 km | MPC · JPL |
| 592659 | 2015 BQ_{326} | — | October 5, 2013 | Haleakala | Pan-STARRS 1 | · | 1.2 km | MPC · JPL |
| 592660 | 2015 BE_{332} | — | January 2, 2011 | Mount Lemmon | Mount Lemmon Survey | · | 1.0 km | MPC · JPL |
| 592661 | 2015 BM_{338} | — | November 30, 2003 | Kitt Peak | Spacewatch | · | 650 m | MPC · JPL |
| 592662 | 2015 BR_{343} | — | August 9, 2013 | Kitt Peak | Spacewatch | NYS | 1.0 km | MPC · JPL |
| 592663 | 2015 BX_{345} | — | December 26, 2014 | Haleakala | Pan-STARRS 1 | · | 2.6 km | MPC · JPL |
| 592664 | 2015 BU_{352} | — | April 25, 2007 | Mount Lemmon | Mount Lemmon Survey | · | 1.1 km | MPC · JPL |
| 592665 | 2015 BB_{353} | — | January 18, 2015 | Haleakala | Pan-STARRS 1 | MAR | 720 m | MPC · JPL |
| 592666 | 2015 BJ_{354} | — | November 23, 2009 | Mount Lemmon | Mount Lemmon Survey | · | 1.0 km | MPC · JPL |
| 592667 | 2015 BS_{355} | — | September 29, 2008 | Mount Lemmon | Mount Lemmon Survey | ADE | 1.9 km | MPC · JPL |
| 592668 | 2015 BY_{389} | — | June 1, 2008 | Mount Lemmon | Mount Lemmon Survey | · | 1.1 km | MPC · JPL |
| 592669 | 2015 BN_{392} | — | October 24, 2013 | Mount Lemmon | Mount Lemmon Survey | · | 1.2 km | MPC · JPL |
| 592670 | 2015 BQ_{394} | — | May 30, 2012 | Mount Lemmon | Mount Lemmon Survey | · | 1.2 km | MPC · JPL |
| 592671 | 2015 BY_{396} | — | January 20, 2015 | Haleakala | Pan-STARRS 1 | · | 1.1 km | MPC · JPL |
| 592672 | 2015 BJ_{400} | — | January 20, 2015 | Haleakala | Pan-STARRS 1 | · | 680 m | MPC · JPL |
| 592673 | 2015 BL_{401} | — | December 29, 2005 | Kitt Peak | Spacewatch | · | 1.2 km | MPC · JPL |
| 592674 | 2015 BU_{406} | — | October 9, 2013 | Mount Lemmon | Mount Lemmon Survey | · | 990 m | MPC · JPL |
| 592675 | 2015 BO_{409} | — | January 11, 2011 | Mount Lemmon | Mount Lemmon Survey | MAR | 990 m | MPC · JPL |
| 592676 | 2015 BJ_{412} | — | April 14, 2007 | Mount Lemmon | Mount Lemmon Survey | · | 1.3 km | MPC · JPL |
| 592677 | 2015 BA_{416} | — | February 13, 2011 | Mount Lemmon | Mount Lemmon Survey | (5) | 750 m | MPC · JPL |
| 592678 | 2015 BB_{431} | — | April 2, 2011 | Kitt Peak | Spacewatch | · | 1.3 km | MPC · JPL |
| 592679 | 2015 BR_{431} | — | January 20, 2015 | Haleakala | Pan-STARRS 1 | · | 930 m | MPC · JPL |
| 592680 | 2015 BD_{434} | — | March 27, 2011 | Mount Lemmon | Mount Lemmon Survey | · | 1.6 km | MPC · JPL |
| 592681 | 2015 BO_{435} | — | January 20, 2015 | Haleakala | Pan-STARRS 1 | MAR | 730 m | MPC · JPL |
| 592682 | 2015 BB_{442} | — | January 20, 2015 | Haleakala | Pan-STARRS 1 | · | 1.0 km | MPC · JPL |
| 592683 | 2015 BE_{442} | — | April 3, 2011 | Haleakala | Pan-STARRS 1 | · | 1.1 km | MPC · JPL |
| 592684 | 2015 BE_{445} | — | March 28, 2011 | Mount Lemmon | Mount Lemmon Survey | · | 1.1 km | MPC · JPL |
| 592685 | 2015 BT_{445} | — | February 25, 2006 | Kitt Peak | Spacewatch | AEO | 950 m | MPC · JPL |
| 592686 | 2015 BC_{448} | — | January 20, 2015 | Haleakala | Pan-STARRS 1 | · | 1.3 km | MPC · JPL |
| 592687 | 2015 BC_{450} | — | January 10, 2011 | Mount Lemmon | Mount Lemmon Survey | · | 950 m | MPC · JPL |
| 592688 | 2015 BQ_{450} | — | January 20, 2015 | Haleakala | Pan-STARRS 1 | MRX | 870 m | MPC · JPL |
| 592689 | 2015 BA_{452} | — | January 20, 2015 | Haleakala | Pan-STARRS 1 | · | 1.1 km | MPC · JPL |
| 592690 | 2015 BY_{453} | — | December 27, 2005 | Kitt Peak | Spacewatch | · | 1.3 km | MPC · JPL |
| 592691 | 2015 BK_{463} | — | January 20, 2015 | Haleakala | Pan-STARRS 1 | · | 1.1 km | MPC · JPL |
| 592692 | 2015 BU_{485} | — | September 6, 2008 | Mount Lemmon | Mount Lemmon Survey | · | 1.2 km | MPC · JPL |
| 592693 | 2015 BC_{487} | — | April 1, 2011 | Mount Lemmon | Mount Lemmon Survey | · | 1.5 km | MPC · JPL |
| 592694 | 2015 BQ_{489} | — | October 26, 1995 | Kitt Peak | Spacewatch | · | 890 m | MPC · JPL |
| 592695 | 2015 BY_{496} | — | March 6, 2011 | Kitt Peak | Spacewatch | · | 1.5 km | MPC · JPL |
| 592696 | 2015 BT_{497} | — | January 20, 2015 | Haleakala | Pan-STARRS 1 | · | 740 m | MPC · JPL |
| 592697 | 2015 BV_{500} | — | February 26, 2011 | Mount Lemmon | Mount Lemmon Survey | · | 1.0 km | MPC · JPL |
| 592698 | 2015 BE_{503} | — | January 20, 2015 | Haleakala | Pan-STARRS 1 | · | 970 m | MPC · JPL |
| 592699 | 2015 BK_{521} | — | September 16, 2009 | Kitt Peak | Spacewatch | L4 · 006 | 7.7 km | MPC · JPL |
| 592700 | 2015 BQ_{521} | — | September 7, 2008 | Mount Lemmon | Mount Lemmon Survey | H | 300 m | MPC · JPL |

== 592701–592800 ==
back to top

| Designation | | | Discovery | | | Properties | | Ref |
| Permanent | Provisional | Named after | Date | Site | Discoverer(s) | Category | Diam. | Ref |
|---|---|---|---|---|---|---|---|---|
| 592701 | 2015 BV_{543} | — | September 7, 2008 | Mount Lemmon | Mount Lemmon Survey | · | 1.1 km | MPC · JPL |
| 592702 | 2015 BL_{546} | — | October 6, 2013 | Kitt Peak | Spacewatch | · | 1.8 km | MPC · JPL |
| 592703 | 2015 BP_{546} | — | November 17, 2009 | Mount Lemmon | Mount Lemmon Survey | ADE | 1.3 km | MPC · JPL |
| 592704 | 2015 BB_{547} | — | February 24, 2015 | Haleakala | Pan-STARRS 1 | · | 2.0 km | MPC · JPL |
| 592705 | 2015 BG_{549} | — | January 18, 2015 | Haleakala | Pan-STARRS 1 | MAR | 810 m | MPC · JPL |
| 592706 | 2015 BR_{549} | — | January 20, 2015 | Haleakala | Pan-STARRS 1 | · | 1.2 km | MPC · JPL |
| 592707 | 2015 BX_{549} | — | August 23, 2004 | Kitt Peak | Spacewatch | · | 1.3 km | MPC · JPL |
| 592708 | 2015 BK_{551} | — | May 10, 2011 | Mount Lemmon | Mount Lemmon Survey | · | 1.5 km | MPC · JPL |
| 592709 | 2015 BX_{553} | — | January 24, 2007 | Mount Lemmon | Mount Lemmon Survey | · | 970 m | MPC · JPL |
| 592710 Lenghu | 2015 BL_{563} | Lenghu | March 29, 2011 | XuYi | PMO NEO Survey Program | · | 1.7 km | MPC · JPL |
| 592711 | 2015 BO_{563} | — | January 20, 2015 | Haleakala | Pan-STARRS 1 | · | 820 m | MPC · JPL |
| 592712 | 2015 BS_{566} | — | December 4, 2005 | Mount Lemmon | Mount Lemmon Survey | · | 1.7 km | MPC · JPL |
| 592713 | 2015 BC_{568} | — | November 8, 2013 | Kitt Peak | Spacewatch | MAR | 830 m | MPC · JPL |
| 592714 | 2015 BJ_{570} | — | January 19, 2015 | Haleakala | Pan-STARRS 1 | H | 380 m | MPC · JPL |
| 592715 | 2015 BY_{570} | — | March 7, 2016 | Haleakala | Pan-STARRS 1 | · | 1.2 km | MPC · JPL |
| 592716 | 2015 BB_{571} | — | January 22, 2015 | Haleakala | Pan-STARRS 1 | · | 1.9 km | MPC · JPL |
| 592717 | 2015 BF_{584} | — | January 20, 2015 | Haleakala | Pan-STARRS 1 | L4 | 8.4 km | MPC · JPL |
| 592718 | 2015 BZ_{589} | — | January 23, 2015 | Haleakala | Pan-STARRS 1 | H | 520 m | MPC · JPL |
| 592719 | 2015 BZ_{597} | — | January 28, 2015 | Haleakala | Pan-STARRS 1 | · | 1.1 km | MPC · JPL |
| 592720 | 2015 BN_{599} | — | January 25, 2015 | Haleakala | Pan-STARRS 1 | · | 1.2 km | MPC · JPL |
| 592721 | 2015 BR_{600} | — | January 21, 2015 | Haleakala | Pan-STARRS 1 | · | 1.4 km | MPC · JPL |
| 592722 | 2015 BS_{603} | — | January 18, 2015 | Mount Lemmon | Mount Lemmon Survey | · | 1.2 km | MPC · JPL |
| 592723 | 2015 BT_{603} | — | January 18, 2015 | Mount Lemmon | Mount Lemmon Survey | · | 850 m | MPC · JPL |
| 592724 | 2015 BE_{613} | — | January 22, 2015 | Haleakala | Pan-STARRS 1 | · | 1.3 km | MPC · JPL |
| 592725 | 2015 BZ_{617} | — | January 22, 2015 | Haleakala | Pan-STARRS 1 | · | 1.6 km | MPC · JPL |
| 592726 | 2015 CP_{2} | — | February 7, 2015 | Mount Lemmon | Mount Lemmon Survey | · | 1.4 km | MPC · JPL |
| 592727 | 2015 CS_{3} | — | April 5, 2005 | Mount Lemmon | Mount Lemmon Survey | · | 720 m | MPC · JPL |
| 592728 | 2015 CW_{4} | — | February 29, 2008 | Kitt Peak | Spacewatch | · | 770 m | MPC · JPL |
| 592729 | 2015 CY_{9} | — | December 1, 2005 | Kitt Peak | Spacewatch | · | 1.0 km | MPC · JPL |
| 592730 | 2015 CT_{10} | — | January 7, 2005 | Catalina | CSS | · | 2.7 km | MPC · JPL |
| 592731 | 2015 CG_{14} | — | January 11, 2011 | Mount Lemmon | Mount Lemmon Survey | · | 1.0 km | MPC · JPL |
| 592732 | 2015 CA_{16} | — | April 5, 2008 | Mount Lemmon | Mount Lemmon Survey | 3:2 | 4.3 km | MPC · JPL |
| 592733 | 2015 CB_{17} | — | March 7, 2003 | Anderson Mesa | LONEOS | · | 1.1 km | MPC · JPL |
| 592734 | 2015 CU_{19} | — | February 26, 2011 | Mount Lemmon | Mount Lemmon Survey | · | 820 m | MPC · JPL |
| 592735 | 2015 CV_{19} | — | January 16, 2015 | Haleakala | Pan-STARRS 1 | EUN | 990 m | MPC · JPL |
| 592736 | 2015 CK_{20} | — | March 11, 2003 | Palomar | NEAT | RAF | 930 m | MPC · JPL |
| 592737 | 2015 CR_{20} | — | January 18, 2015 | Kitt Peak | Spacewatch | · | 1.5 km | MPC · JPL |
| 592738 | 2015 CD_{26} | — | January 29, 2015 | Haleakala | Pan-STARRS 1 | · | 1.9 km | MPC · JPL |
| 592739 | 2015 CQ_{28} | — | January 28, 2007 | Mount Lemmon | Mount Lemmon Survey | · | 1.2 km | MPC · JPL |
| 592740 | 2015 CH_{30} | — | January 20, 2015 | Haleakala | Pan-STARRS 1 | · | 910 m | MPC · JPL |
| 592741 | 2015 CU_{30} | — | January 20, 2015 | Haleakala | Pan-STARRS 1 | MAR | 940 m | MPC · JPL |
| 592742 | 2015 CF_{35} | — | January 26, 2007 | Kitt Peak | Spacewatch | · | 700 m | MPC · JPL |
| 592743 | 2015 CU_{37} | — | January 22, 2015 | Catalina | CSS | · | 1.2 km | MPC · JPL |
| 592744 | 2015 CP_{38} | — | September 15, 2013 | Kitt Peak | Spacewatch | · | 1.3 km | MPC · JPL |
| 592745 | 2015 CF_{41} | — | January 26, 2011 | Kitt Peak | Spacewatch | · | 900 m | MPC · JPL |
| 592746 | 2015 CT_{42} | — | February 15, 2015 | Haleakala | Pan-STARRS 1 | · | 1.9 km | MPC · JPL |
| 592747 | 2015 CG_{46} | — | September 7, 2008 | Mount Lemmon | Mount Lemmon Survey | · | 1.4 km | MPC · JPL |
| 592748 | 2015 CW_{47} | — | February 15, 2015 | Haleakala | Pan-STARRS 1 | (5) | 880 m | MPC · JPL |
| 592749 | 2015 CL_{50} | — | April 1, 2011 | Kitt Peak | Spacewatch | · | 1.2 km | MPC · JPL |
| 592750 Seiichifujiwara | 2015 CB_{51} | Seiichifujiwara | August 7, 2013 | Piszkéstető | T. Csörgei, K. Sárneczky | H | 470 m | MPC · JPL |
| 592751 | 2015 CO_{51} | — | February 8, 2002 | Kitt Peak | Spacewatch | L4 | 10 km | MPC · JPL |
| 592752 | 2015 CD_{52} | — | January 25, 2015 | Haleakala | Pan-STARRS 1 | · | 1.5 km | MPC · JPL |
| 592753 | 2015 CV_{52} | — | February 15, 2015 | Haleakala | Pan-STARRS 1 | H | 440 m | MPC · JPL |
| 592754 | 2015 CY_{53} | — | March 11, 2011 | Mount Lemmon | Mount Lemmon Survey | · | 1.2 km | MPC · JPL |
| 592755 | 2015 CM_{55} | — | February 1, 2006 | Kitt Peak | Spacewatch | · | 1.5 km | MPC · JPL |
| 592756 | 2015 CE_{57} | — | January 20, 2015 | Haleakala | Pan-STARRS 1 | H | 450 m | MPC · JPL |
| 592757 | 2015 CM_{57} | — | December 2, 2005 | Mount Lemmon | Mount Lemmon Survey | · | 1.4 km | MPC · JPL |
| 592758 | 2015 CW_{58} | — | January 21, 2015 | Haleakala | Pan-STARRS 1 | · | 1.4 km | MPC · JPL |
| 592759 | 2015 CC_{62} | — | March 23, 2003 | Apache Point | SDSS Collaboration | · | 1.4 km | MPC · JPL |
| 592760 | 2015 CR_{66} | — | February 8, 2011 | Mount Lemmon | Mount Lemmon Survey | · | 1.2 km | MPC · JPL |
| 592761 | 2015 CC_{70} | — | February 13, 2015 | Mount Lemmon | Mount Lemmon Survey | · | 1.3 km | MPC · JPL |
| 592762 | 2015 CX_{72} | — | February 9, 2015 | Mount Lemmon | Mount Lemmon Survey | EUN | 930 m | MPC · JPL |
| 592763 | 2015 DD_{2} | — | November 26, 2014 | Haleakala | Pan-STARRS 1 | · | 1.2 km | MPC · JPL |
| 592764 | 2015 DK_{9} | — | September 27, 2006 | Vail-Jarnac | Jarnac | · | 880 m | MPC · JPL |
| 592765 | 2015 DL_{11} | — | December 5, 2005 | Mount Lemmon | Mount Lemmon Survey | · | 1.6 km | MPC · JPL |
| 592766 | 2015 DL_{12} | — | May 22, 2003 | Kitt Peak | Spacewatch | · | 1.4 km | MPC · JPL |
| 592767 | 2015 DX_{12} | — | January 22, 2015 | Haleakala | Pan-STARRS 1 | · | 940 m | MPC · JPL |
| 592768 | 2015 DN_{14} | — | August 8, 2004 | Socorro | LINEAR | EUN | 1.5 km | MPC · JPL |
| 592769 | 2015 DB_{16} | — | April 3, 2011 | Haleakala | Pan-STARRS 1 | · | 1.2 km | MPC · JPL |
| 592770 | 2015 DD_{19} | — | October 3, 2013 | Mount Lemmon | Mount Lemmon Survey | · | 930 m | MPC · JPL |
| 592771 | 2015 DS_{19} | — | March 29, 2011 | Mount Lemmon | Mount Lemmon Survey | · | 1.1 km | MPC · JPL |
| 592772 | 2015 DC_{24} | — | February 16, 2015 | Haleakala | Pan-STARRS 1 | · | 1.2 km | MPC · JPL |
| 592773 | 2015 DA_{26} | — | January 29, 2015 | Haleakala | Pan-STARRS 1 | · | 1.4 km | MPC · JPL |
| 592774 | 2015 DP_{32} | — | February 16, 2015 | Haleakala | Pan-STARRS 1 | · | 1.2 km | MPC · JPL |
| 592775 | 2015 DT_{33} | — | January 27, 2015 | Haleakala | Pan-STARRS 1 | MRX | 770 m | MPC · JPL |
| 592776 | 2015 DO_{36} | — | November 27, 2013 | Haleakala | Pan-STARRS 1 | · | 1.1 km | MPC · JPL |
| 592777 | 2015 DU_{38} | — | February 16, 2015 | Haleakala | Pan-STARRS 1 | · | 1.7 km | MPC · JPL |
| 592778 | 2015 DY_{42} | — | January 27, 2015 | Haleakala | Pan-STARRS 1 | · | 1.6 km | MPC · JPL |
| 592779 | 2015 DG_{43} | — | February 16, 2015 | Haleakala | Pan-STARRS 1 | · | 1.1 km | MPC · JPL |
| 592780 | 2015 DM_{43} | — | November 28, 2013 | Mount Lemmon | Mount Lemmon Survey | (5) | 1.4 km | MPC · JPL |
| 592781 | 2015 DZ_{43} | — | May 5, 2011 | Charleston | R. Holmes | EUN | 990 m | MPC · JPL |
| 592782 | 2015 DQ_{46} | — | February 16, 2015 | Haleakala | Pan-STARRS 1 | · | 1.2 km | MPC · JPL |
| 592783 | 2015 DW_{46} | — | May 26, 2011 | Mount Lemmon | Mount Lemmon Survey | · | 1.5 km | MPC · JPL |
| 592784 | 2015 DD_{47} | — | May 8, 2011 | Mount Lemmon | Mount Lemmon Survey | · | 1.4 km | MPC · JPL |
| 592785 | 2015 DU_{47} | — | September 25, 2008 | Mount Lemmon | Mount Lemmon Survey | · | 1.1 km | MPC · JPL |
| 592786 | 2015 DU_{49} | — | March 9, 2011 | Mount Lemmon | Mount Lemmon Survey | · | 910 m | MPC · JPL |
| 592787 | 2015 DH_{50} | — | January 23, 2006 | Mount Lemmon | Mount Lemmon Survey | · | 1.2 km | MPC · JPL |
| 592788 | 2015 DZ_{51} | — | May 27, 2011 | Kitt Peak | Spacewatch | · | 1.5 km | MPC · JPL |
| 592789 | 2015 DZ_{60} | — | April 5, 2011 | Kitt Peak | Spacewatch | · | 1.3 km | MPC · JPL |
| 592790 | 2015 DD_{61} | — | September 6, 2008 | Mount Lemmon | Mount Lemmon Survey | · | 1.6 km | MPC · JPL |
| 592791 | 2015 DN_{64} | — | January 20, 2015 | Haleakala | Pan-STARRS 1 | MAR | 780 m | MPC · JPL |
| 592792 | 2015 DW_{64} | — | September 19, 1998 | Apache Point | SDSS Collaboration | · | 1.0 km | MPC · JPL |
| 592793 | 2015 DM_{67} | — | May 14, 2008 | Kitt Peak | Spacewatch | (5) | 1.2 km | MPC · JPL |
| 592794 | 2015 DS_{69} | — | April 13, 2011 | Kitt Peak | Spacewatch | AEO | 870 m | MPC · JPL |
| 592795 | 2015 DS_{70} | — | January 20, 2015 | Haleakala | Pan-STARRS 1 | · | 810 m | MPC · JPL |
| 592796 | 2015 DQ_{82} | — | January 8, 2011 | Mount Lemmon | Mount Lemmon Survey | · | 1.4 km | MPC · JPL |
| 592797 | 2015 DL_{84} | — | February 10, 2015 | Mount Lemmon | Mount Lemmon Survey | GEF | 980 m | MPC · JPL |
| 592798 | 2015 DX_{84} | — | February 27, 2006 | Kitt Peak | Spacewatch | · | 1.2 km | MPC · JPL |
| 592799 | 2015 DG_{88} | — | March 14, 2007 | Kitt Peak | Spacewatch | · | 1.3 km | MPC · JPL |
| 592800 | 2015 DT_{91} | — | January 22, 2015 | Haleakala | Pan-STARRS 1 | · | 1.2 km | MPC · JPL |

== 592801–592900 ==
back to top

| Designation | | | Discovery | | | Properties | | Ref |
| Permanent | Provisional | Named after | Date | Site | Discoverer(s) | Category | Diam. | Ref |
|---|---|---|---|---|---|---|---|---|
| 592801 | 2015 DC_{107} | — | January 23, 2015 | Haleakala | Pan-STARRS 1 | · | 1.5 km | MPC · JPL |
| 592802 | 2015 DT_{110} | — | January 27, 2015 | Haleakala | Pan-STARRS 1 | · | 1.3 km | MPC · JPL |
| 592803 | 2015 DG_{112} | — | January 25, 2015 | Haleakala | Pan-STARRS 1 | EUN | 1.0 km | MPC · JPL |
| 592804 | 2015 DN_{113} | — | March 17, 2007 | Kitt Peak | Spacewatch | · | 1.2 km | MPC · JPL |
| 592805 | 2015 DV_{114} | — | March 23, 2003 | Apache Point | SDSS Collaboration | · | 1.7 km | MPC · JPL |
| 592806 | 2015 DM_{122} | — | April 11, 2002 | Palomar | NEAT | · | 2.8 km | MPC · JPL |
| 592807 | 2015 DD_{125} | — | December 29, 2014 | Haleakala | Pan-STARRS 1 | · | 1.9 km | MPC · JPL |
| 592808 | 2015 DV_{129} | — | October 12, 2010 | Mount Lemmon | Mount Lemmon Survey | L4 | 7.0 km | MPC · JPL |
| 592809 | 2015 DH_{130} | — | April 15, 2002 | Kitt Peak | Spacewatch | EUN | 1.3 km | MPC · JPL |
| 592810 | 2015 DN_{131} | — | June 21, 2012 | Kitt Peak | Spacewatch | · | 1.7 km | MPC · JPL |
| 592811 | 2015 DR_{131} | — | September 23, 2008 | Mount Lemmon | Mount Lemmon Survey | EUN | 1.2 km | MPC · JPL |
| 592812 | 2015 DX_{131} | — | April 1, 2011 | Mount Lemmon | Mount Lemmon Survey | MAR | 880 m | MPC · JPL |
| 592813 | 2015 DM_{134} | — | December 22, 2012 | Haleakala | Pan-STARRS 1 | L4 | 9.1 km | MPC · JPL |
| 592814 | 2015 DX_{134} | — | December 1, 2005 | Kitt Peak | Spacewatch | · | 1.3 km | MPC · JPL |
| 592815 | 2015 DS_{136} | — | November 1, 2005 | Catalina | CSS | · | 1.2 km | MPC · JPL |
| 592816 | 2015 DT_{136} | — | May 9, 2007 | Kitt Peak | Spacewatch | · | 1.0 km | MPC · JPL |
| 592817 | 2015 DB_{137} | — | December 29, 2014 | Haleakala | Pan-STARRS 1 | · | 1.7 km | MPC · JPL |
| 592818 | 2015 DF_{137} | — | October 3, 2013 | Mount Lemmon | Mount Lemmon Survey | ADE | 1.7 km | MPC · JPL |
| 592819 | 2015 DB_{140} | — | February 17, 2007 | Mount Lemmon | Mount Lemmon Survey | · | 1.3 km | MPC · JPL |
| 592820 | 2015 DM_{145} | — | October 30, 2013 | Haleakala | Pan-STARRS 1 | · | 1.5 km | MPC · JPL |
| 592821 | 2015 DQ_{146} | — | October 25, 2005 | Mount Lemmon | Mount Lemmon Survey | · | 1.2 km | MPC · JPL |
| 592822 | 2015 DY_{146} | — | February 23, 2011 | Catalina | CSS | · | 840 m | MPC · JPL |
| 592823 | 2015 DL_{148} | — | November 30, 2010 | Mount Lemmon | Mount Lemmon Survey | · | 1.0 km | MPC · JPL |
| 592824 | 2015 DR_{150} | — | April 3, 2011 | Haleakala | Pan-STARRS 1 | · | 1.5 km | MPC · JPL |
| 592825 | 2015 DW_{151} | — | May 7, 2006 | Kitt Peak | Spacewatch | · | 1.7 km | MPC · JPL |
| 592826 | 2015 DH_{152} | — | December 29, 2014 | Haleakala | Pan-STARRS 1 | · | 1.4 km | MPC · JPL |
| 592827 | 2015 DY_{152} | — | February 27, 2007 | Kitt Peak | Spacewatch | H | 360 m | MPC · JPL |
| 592828 | 2015 DA_{153} | — | September 16, 2003 | Kitt Peak | Spacewatch | H | 600 m | MPC · JPL |
| 592829 | 2015 DL_{162} | — | November 27, 2013 | Haleakala | Pan-STARRS 1 | WIT | 750 m | MPC · JPL |
| 592830 | 2015 DF_{163} | — | February 18, 2015 | Haleakala | Pan-STARRS 1 | · | 1.2 km | MPC · JPL |
| 592831 | 2015 DM_{173} | — | January 25, 2015 | Haleakala | Pan-STARRS 1 | MAR | 760 m | MPC · JPL |
| 592832 | 2015 DT_{174} | — | January 16, 2015 | Haleakala | Pan-STARRS 1 | EUN | 1.3 km | MPC · JPL |
| 592833 | 2015 DW_{175} | — | November 29, 2013 | Mount Lemmon | Mount Lemmon Survey | EUN | 1.2 km | MPC · JPL |
| 592834 | 2015 DB_{182} | — | September 16, 2003 | Kitt Peak | Spacewatch | · | 1.6 km | MPC · JPL |
| 592835 | 2015 DH_{184} | — | October 5, 2013 | Haleakala | Pan-STARRS 1 | MAR | 740 m | MPC · JPL |
| 592836 | 2015 DS_{190} | — | August 21, 2004 | Siding Spring | SSS | · | 2.0 km | MPC · JPL |
| 592837 | 2015 DV_{194} | — | November 6, 2005 | Kitt Peak | Spacewatch | · | 1.4 km | MPC · JPL |
| 592838 | 2015 DW_{197} | — | January 23, 2015 | Haleakala | Pan-STARRS 1 | · | 1.3 km | MPC · JPL |
| 592839 | 2015 DB_{202} | — | January 7, 2006 | Kitt Peak | Spacewatch | · | 1.7 km | MPC · JPL |
| 592840 | 2015 DO_{204} | — | October 9, 2008 | Mount Lemmon | Mount Lemmon Survey | · | 2.2 km | MPC · JPL |
| 592841 | 2015 DK_{210} | — | January 25, 2014 | Haleakala | Pan-STARRS 1 | · | 2.2 km | MPC · JPL |
| 592842 | 2015 DH_{214} | — | December 2, 2005 | Kitt Peak | Spacewatch | (5) | 1.0 km | MPC · JPL |
| 592843 | 2015 DL_{214} | — | September 27, 2009 | Mount Lemmon | Mount Lemmon Survey | L4 | 9.3 km | MPC · JPL |
| 592844 | 2015 DD_{215} | — | February 14, 2002 | Kitt Peak | Spacewatch | · | 1.2 km | MPC · JPL |
| 592845 | 2015 DG_{218} | — | May 26, 2011 | Mount Lemmon | Mount Lemmon Survey | · | 1.5 km | MPC · JPL |
| 592846 | 2015 DQ_{218} | — | December 30, 2014 | Mount Lemmon | Mount Lemmon Survey | · | 1.0 km | MPC · JPL |
| 592847 | 2015 DC_{220} | — | September 20, 2003 | Kitt Peak | Spacewatch | · | 2.0 km | MPC · JPL |
| 592848 | 2015 DF_{220} | — | January 20, 2015 | Haleakala | Pan-STARRS 1 | · | 1.5 km | MPC · JPL |
| 592849 | 2015 DZ_{221} | — | January 10, 2007 | Kitt Peak | Spacewatch | · | 1.3 km | MPC · JPL |
| 592850 | 2015 DG_{222} | — | March 4, 2011 | Kitt Peak | Spacewatch | · | 850 m | MPC · JPL |
| 592851 | 2015 DY_{223} | — | April 29, 2003 | Kitt Peak | Spacewatch | · | 1.2 km | MPC · JPL |
| 592852 | 2015 DQ_{225} | — | September 18, 2010 | Mount Lemmon | Mount Lemmon Survey | H | 440 m | MPC · JPL |
| 592853 | 2015 DW_{225} | — | December 30, 2011 | Kitt Peak | Spacewatch | H | 360 m | MPC · JPL |
| 592854 | 2015 DP_{228} | — | July 25, 2003 | Palomar | NEAT | · | 2.2 km | MPC · JPL |
| 592855 | 2015 DO_{229} | — | February 16, 2015 | Haleakala | Pan-STARRS 1 | · | 1.3 km | MPC · JPL |
| 592856 | 2015 DC_{230} | — | November 26, 2013 | Haleakala | Pan-STARRS 1 | · | 1.6 km | MPC · JPL |
| 592857 | 2015 DB_{233} | — | October 17, 2009 | Mount Lemmon | Mount Lemmon Survey | · | 700 m | MPC · JPL |
| 592858 | 2015 DO_{233} | — | March 28, 2011 | Mount Lemmon | Mount Lemmon Survey | · | 1.1 km | MPC · JPL |
| 592859 | 2015 DQ_{235} | — | February 16, 2015 | Haleakala | Pan-STARRS 1 | · | 1.1 km | MPC · JPL |
| 592860 | 2015 DL_{243} | — | February 20, 2015 | Haleakala | Pan-STARRS 1 | · | 1.7 km | MPC · JPL |
| 592861 | 2015 DB_{245} | — | February 23, 2015 | Haleakala | Pan-STARRS 1 | · | 1.2 km | MPC · JPL |
| 592862 | 2015 DC_{248} | — | February 27, 2015 | Haleakala | Pan-STARRS 1 | · | 1.5 km | MPC · JPL |
| 592863 | 2015 DG_{250} | — | February 20, 2015 | Haleakala | Pan-STARRS 1 | H | 500 m | MPC · JPL |
| 592864 | 2015 DT_{260} | — | February 24, 2015 | Haleakala | Pan-STARRS 1 | · | 1.3 km | MPC · JPL |
| 592865 | 2015 DT_{262} | — | February 27, 2015 | Haleakala | Pan-STARRS 1 | L4 | 7.8 km | MPC · JPL |
| 592866 | 2015 DG_{263} | — | February 16, 2015 | Haleakala | Pan-STARRS 1 | · | 880 m | MPC · JPL |
| 592867 | 2015 DH_{263} | — | February 24, 2015 | Haleakala | Pan-STARRS 1 | · | 1.7 km | MPC · JPL |
| 592868 | 2015 DJ_{265} | — | February 16, 2015 | Haleakala | Pan-STARRS 1 | · | 1.3 km | MPC · JPL |
| 592869 | 2015 DN_{268} | — | February 23, 2015 | Haleakala | Pan-STARRS 1 | · | 1.8 km | MPC · JPL |
| 592870 | 2015 DR_{268} | — | June 7, 2011 | Mount Lemmon | Mount Lemmon Survey | · | 1.4 km | MPC · JPL |
| 592871 | 2015 DG_{270} | — | February 27, 2015 | Haleakala | Pan-STARRS 1 | · | 1.5 km | MPC · JPL |
| 592872 | 2015 DR_{270} | — | February 17, 2015 | Haleakala | Pan-STARRS 1 | · | 1.2 km | MPC · JPL |
| 592873 | 2015 DU_{272} | — | February 19, 2015 | Haleakala | Pan-STARRS 1 | · | 1.3 km | MPC · JPL |
| 592874 | 2015 DR_{276} | — | February 16, 2015 | Haleakala | Pan-STARRS 1 | · | 1.5 km | MPC · JPL |
| 592875 | 2015 DV_{277} | — | February 17, 2015 | Haleakala | Pan-STARRS 1 | L4 | 7.5 km | MPC · JPL |
| 592876 | 2015 DP_{278} | — | February 17, 2015 | Haleakala | Pan-STARRS 1 | NEM | 2.0 km | MPC · JPL |
| 592877 | 2015 EJ_{1} | — | February 27, 2015 | Catalina | CSS | PHO | 910 m | MPC · JPL |
| 592878 | 2015 EN_{4} | — | November 26, 2014 | Haleakala | Pan-STARRS 1 | · | 1.3 km | MPC · JPL |
| 592879 | 2015 ET_{4} | — | September 4, 2008 | Kitt Peak | Spacewatch | · | 1.3 km | MPC · JPL |
| 592880 | 2015 EX_{6} | — | May 16, 2010 | Catalina | CSS | H | 550 m | MPC · JPL |
| 592881 | 2015 ES_{7} | — | March 13, 2002 | Palomar | NEAT | · | 1.9 km | MPC · JPL |
| 592882 | 2015 EU_{9} | — | February 11, 2015 | Mount Lemmon | Mount Lemmon Survey | · | 920 m | MPC · JPL |
| 592883 | 2015 EH_{10} | — | February 13, 2011 | Mount Lemmon | Mount Lemmon Survey | · | 1.3 km | MPC · JPL |
| 592884 | 2015 ER_{10} | — | October 10, 2008 | Mount Lemmon | Mount Lemmon Survey | EUN | 1.0 km | MPC · JPL |
| 592885 | 2015 EA_{12} | — | March 15, 2007 | Mount Lemmon | Mount Lemmon Survey | · | 1.6 km | MPC · JPL |
| 592886 | 2015 EB_{12} | — | April 7, 2003 | Kitt Peak | Spacewatch | · | 1.2 km | MPC · JPL |
| 592887 | 2015 EK_{13} | — | October 14, 2001 | Apache Point | SDSS Collaboration | · | 960 m | MPC · JPL |
| 592888 | 2015 EZ_{13} | — | March 2, 2005 | Kitt Peak | Spacewatch | H | 410 m | MPC · JPL |
| 592889 | 2015 EJ_{16} | — | January 23, 2015 | Haleakala | Pan-STARRS 1 | · | 1.1 km | MPC · JPL |
| 592890 | 2015 EQ_{16} | — | January 25, 2015 | Haleakala | Pan-STARRS 1 | · | 930 m | MPC · JPL |
| 592891 | 2015 EC_{24} | — | January 22, 2015 | Haleakala | Pan-STARRS 1 | · | 1.1 km | MPC · JPL |
| 592892 | 2015 ES_{25} | — | March 2, 2006 | Kitt Peak | Spacewatch | · | 1.4 km | MPC · JPL |
| 592893 | 2015 EU_{25} | — | October 13, 2013 | Mount Lemmon | Mount Lemmon Survey | · | 910 m | MPC · JPL |
| 592894 | 2015 EG_{27} | — | December 8, 2010 | Mount Lemmon | Mount Lemmon Survey | NYS | 970 m | MPC · JPL |
| 592895 | 2015 EG_{30} | — | October 26, 2001 | Haleakala | NEAT | MAR | 1.0 km | MPC · JPL |
| 592896 | 2015 EN_{31} | — | November 6, 2013 | Haleakala | Pan-STARRS 1 | · | 1.1 km | MPC · JPL |
| 592897 | 2015 EB_{37} | — | March 11, 2015 | Mount Lemmon | Mount Lemmon Survey | · | 1.3 km | MPC · JPL |
| 592898 | 2015 ET_{39} | — | October 7, 2005 | Mauna Kea | A. Boattini | · | 1.5 km | MPC · JPL |
| 592899 | 2015 EP_{47} | — | October 23, 2013 | Mount Lemmon | Mount Lemmon Survey | · | 1.2 km | MPC · JPL |
| 592900 | 2015 EH_{53} | — | February 15, 2015 | Haleakala | Pan-STARRS 1 | · | 1.1 km | MPC · JPL |

== 592901–593000 ==
back to top

| Designation | | | Discovery | | | Properties | | Ref |
| Permanent | Provisional | Named after | Date | Site | Discoverer(s) | Category | Diam. | Ref |
|---|---|---|---|---|---|---|---|---|
| 592901 | 2015 EB_{55} | — | February 17, 2007 | Mount Lemmon | Mount Lemmon Survey | · | 1.3 km | MPC · JPL |
| 592902 | 2015 EW_{56} | — | January 21, 2015 | Haleakala | Pan-STARRS 1 | · | 1.4 km | MPC · JPL |
| 592903 | 2015 EX_{56} | — | August 27, 2008 | Charleston | R. Holmes | · | 1.3 km | MPC · JPL |
| 592904 | 2015 EC_{61} | — | July 9, 2003 | Kitt Peak | Spacewatch | MAR | 1.2 km | MPC · JPL |
| 592905 | 2015 EH_{61} | — | November 27, 2013 | Haleakala | Pan-STARRS 1 | · | 2.2 km | MPC · JPL |
| 592906 | 2015 ES_{61} | — | September 16, 2013 | Mount Lemmon | Mount Lemmon Survey | · | 1.7 km | MPC · JPL |
| 592907 | 2015 EL_{62} | — | October 15, 2013 | Kitt Peak | Spacewatch | BRG | 1.4 km | MPC · JPL |
| 592908 | 2015 EK_{65} | — | January 13, 2011 | Kitt Peak | Spacewatch | · | 760 m | MPC · JPL |
| 592909 | 2015 EM_{65} | — | October 26, 2011 | Haleakala | Pan-STARRS 1 | H | 320 m | MPC · JPL |
| 592910 | 2015 EY_{66} | — | July 13, 2013 | Haleakala | Pan-STARRS 1 | · | 1.2 km | MPC · JPL |
| 592911 | 2015 EA_{76} | — | March 15, 2015 | Haleakala | Pan-STARRS 1 | · | 1.9 km | MPC · JPL |
| 592912 | 2015 FO | — | February 16, 2005 | La Silla | A. Boattini | H | 460 m | MPC · JPL |
| 592913 | 2015 FR | — | October 20, 2006 | Mount Lemmon | Mount Lemmon Survey | · | 380 m | MPC · JPL |
| 592914 | 2015 FU | — | May 13, 1999 | Socorro | LINEAR | · | 1.7 km | MPC · JPL |
| 592915 | 2015 FQ_{8} | — | February 7, 2011 | Mount Lemmon | Mount Lemmon Survey | EUN | 1.2 km | MPC · JPL |
| 592916 | 2015 FF_{9} | — | February 18, 2015 | Haleakala | Pan-STARRS 1 | · | 1.9 km | MPC · JPL |
| 592917 | 2015 FN_{9} | — | January 21, 2015 | Haleakala | Pan-STARRS 1 | · | 1.8 km | MPC · JPL |
| 592918 | 2015 FZ_{9} | — | November 11, 2013 | Mount Lemmon | Mount Lemmon Survey | · | 1.6 km | MPC · JPL |
| 592919 | 2015 FU_{10} | — | March 16, 2015 | Haleakala | Pan-STARRS 1 | TIN | 730 m | MPC · JPL |
| 592920 | 2015 FV_{11} | — | March 16, 2015 | Haleakala | Pan-STARRS 1 | · | 1.7 km | MPC · JPL |
| 592921 | 2015 FV_{16} | — | January 16, 2013 | Haleakala | Pan-STARRS 1 | L4 | 7.4 km | MPC · JPL |
| 592922 | 2015 FJ_{17} | — | February 24, 2014 | Haleakala | Pan-STARRS 1 | L4 | 8.0 km | MPC · JPL |
| 592923 | 2015 FR_{17} | — | December 14, 2004 | Socorro | LINEAR | · | 1.8 km | MPC · JPL |
| 592924 | 2015 FX_{17} | — | March 16, 2015 | Haleakala | Pan-STARRS 1 | · | 1.6 km | MPC · JPL |
| 592925 | 2015 FD_{18} | — | May 3, 2011 | Mount Lemmon | Mount Lemmon Survey | EUN | 1.1 km | MPC · JPL |
| 592926 | 2015 FQ_{18} | — | March 16, 2015 | Haleakala | Pan-STARRS 1 | · | 1.6 km | MPC · JPL |
| 592927 | 2015 FX_{18} | — | February 21, 2014 | Kitt Peak | Spacewatch | L4 | 7.5 km | MPC · JPL |
| 592928 | 2015 FT_{20} | — | November 27, 2013 | Haleakala | Pan-STARRS 1 | · | 1.3 km | MPC · JPL |
| 592929 | 2015 FV_{20} | — | February 16, 2015 | Haleakala | Pan-STARRS 1 | · | 1.2 km | MPC · JPL |
| 592930 | 2015 FQ_{21} | — | October 20, 2012 | Haleakala | Pan-STARRS 1 | · | 2.4 km | MPC · JPL |
| 592931 | 2015 FH_{23} | — | November 13, 2010 | Mount Lemmon | Mount Lemmon Survey | L4 | 7.4 km | MPC · JPL |
| 592932 | 2015 FS_{24} | — | February 27, 2015 | Mount Lemmon | Mount Lemmon Survey | · | 1.7 km | MPC · JPL |
| 592933 | 2015 FS_{31} | — | February 27, 2015 | Mount Lemmon | Mount Lemmon Survey | · | 1.1 km | MPC · JPL |
| 592934 | 2015 FW_{34} | — | February 18, 2015 | Haleakala | Pan-STARRS 1 | H | 500 m | MPC · JPL |
| 592935 | 2015 FT_{36} | — | March 9, 2007 | Mount Lemmon | Mount Lemmon Survey | H | 460 m | MPC · JPL |
| 592936 | 2015 FV_{42} | — | September 29, 2008 | Kitt Peak | Spacewatch | HNS | 1.1 km | MPC · JPL |
| 592937 | 2015 FX_{44} | — | October 14, 2013 | Mount Lemmon | Mount Lemmon Survey | · | 1.2 km | MPC · JPL |
| 592938 | 2015 FX_{45} | — | February 8, 2011 | Mount Lemmon | Mount Lemmon Survey | · | 1.2 km | MPC · JPL |
| 592939 | 2015 FJ_{50} | — | April 19, 2007 | Kitt Peak | Spacewatch | · | 960 m | MPC · JPL |
| 592940 | 2015 FQ_{51} | — | February 17, 2007 | Mount Lemmon | Mount Lemmon Survey | H | 340 m | MPC · JPL |
| 592941 | 2015 FR_{56} | — | March 18, 2015 | Haleakala | Pan-STARRS 1 | · | 1.6 km | MPC · JPL |
| 592942 | 2015 FX_{56} | — | February 18, 2015 | Haleakala | Pan-STARRS 1 | · | 1.5 km | MPC · JPL |
| 592943 | 2015 FQ_{59} | — | November 2, 2013 | Kitt Peak | Spacewatch | · | 1.6 km | MPC · JPL |
| 592944 | 2015 FA_{64} | — | January 31, 2015 | Haleakala | Pan-STARRS 1 | MAR | 1.2 km | MPC · JPL |
| 592945 | 2015 FM_{66} | — | March 18, 2015 | Haleakala | Pan-STARRS 1 | EUN | 1.1 km | MPC · JPL |
| 592946 | 2015 FM_{69} | — | December 3, 2010 | Mount Lemmon | Mount Lemmon Survey | L4 | 10 km | MPC · JPL |
| 592947 | 2015 FJ_{71} | — | October 10, 2007 | Mount Lemmon | Mount Lemmon Survey | · | 1.6 km | MPC · JPL |
| 592948 | 2015 FT_{71} | — | October 15, 2009 | Mount Lemmon | Mount Lemmon Survey | L4 | 8.0 km | MPC · JPL |
| 592949 | 2015 FK_{74} | — | March 18, 2015 | Haleakala | Pan-STARRS 1 | · | 1.3 km | MPC · JPL |
| 592950 | 2015 FW_{76} | — | December 7, 2005 | Catalina | CSS | · | 900 m | MPC · JPL |
| 592951 | 2015 FR_{78} | — | October 21, 2012 | Haleakala | Pan-STARRS 1 | · | 1.8 km | MPC · JPL |
| 592952 | 2015 FT_{79} | — | May 8, 2011 | Mount Lemmon | Mount Lemmon Survey | · | 1.3 km | MPC · JPL |
| 592953 | 2015 FZ_{79} | — | March 20, 2015 | Haleakala | Pan-STARRS 1 | · | 1.0 km | MPC · JPL |
| 592954 | 2015 FB_{86} | — | November 25, 2005 | Kitt Peak | Spacewatch | · | 1.1 km | MPC · JPL |
| 592955 | 2015 FH_{93} | — | January 22, 2015 | Haleakala | Pan-STARRS 1 | · | 1.4 km | MPC · JPL |
| 592956 | 2015 FT_{93} | — | September 15, 2013 | Mount Lemmon | Mount Lemmon Survey | EUN | 1.2 km | MPC · JPL |
| 592957 | 2015 FS_{97} | — | November 28, 2013 | Mount Lemmon | Mount Lemmon Survey | · | 1.3 km | MPC · JPL |
| 592958 | 2015 FF_{99} | — | September 22, 2008 | Kitt Peak | Spacewatch | · | 2.1 km | MPC · JPL |
| 592959 | 2015 FG_{103} | — | January 22, 2015 | Haleakala | Pan-STARRS 1 | MAR | 810 m | MPC · JPL |
| 592960 | 2015 FW_{106} | — | October 9, 2012 | Haleakala | Pan-STARRS 1 | · | 1.5 km | MPC · JPL |
| 592961 | 2015 FT_{111} | — | May 22, 2011 | Mount Lemmon | Mount Lemmon Survey | · | 1.7 km | MPC · JPL |
| 592962 | 2015 FY_{111} | — | October 23, 2008 | Kitt Peak | Spacewatch | · | 1.5 km | MPC · JPL |
| 592963 | 2015 FT_{114} | — | September 25, 2012 | Mount Lemmon | Mount Lemmon Survey | AGN | 930 m | MPC · JPL |
| 592964 | 2015 FB_{115} | — | September 7, 2004 | Palomar | NEAT | MAR | 1.6 km | MPC · JPL |
| 592965 | 2015 FX_{115} | — | May 3, 2011 | Mount Lemmon | Mount Lemmon Survey | LEO | 1.6 km | MPC · JPL |
| 592966 | 2015 FJ_{116} | — | February 16, 2015 | Haleakala | Pan-STARRS 1 | · | 1.2 km | MPC · JPL |
| 592967 | 2015 FJ_{118} | — | February 16, 2015 | Haleakala | Pan-STARRS 1 | H | 440 m | MPC · JPL |
| 592968 | 2015 FV_{118} | — | March 25, 2015 | Haleakala | Pan-STARRS 1 | ATE | 170 m | MPC · JPL |
| 592969 | 2015 FT_{121} | — | April 8, 2006 | Kitt Peak | Spacewatch | AEO | 940 m | MPC · JPL |
| 592970 | 2015 FM_{123} | — | November 19, 2009 | Kitt Peak | Spacewatch | · | 1.4 km | MPC · JPL |
| 592971 | 2015 FN_{125} | — | December 11, 2009 | Mount Lemmon | Mount Lemmon Survey | · | 1.9 km | MPC · JPL |
| 592972 | 2015 FC_{128} | — | October 9, 2008 | Mount Lemmon | Mount Lemmon Survey | · | 1.3 km | MPC · JPL |
| 592973 | 2015 FM_{128} | — | January 21, 2015 | Haleakala | Pan-STARRS 1 | · | 1.5 km | MPC · JPL |
| 592974 | 2015 FH_{140} | — | February 12, 2002 | Socorro | LINEAR | · | 1.6 km | MPC · JPL |
| 592975 | 2015 FX_{142} | — | October 31, 2005 | Mauna Kea | A. Boattini | · | 1.5 km | MPC · JPL |
| 592976 | 2015 FH_{144} | — | March 21, 2015 | Haleakala | Pan-STARRS 1 | · | 1.5 km | MPC · JPL |
| 592977 | 2015 FU_{145} | — | March 27, 2003 | Kitt Peak | Spacewatch | L4 | 9.0 km | MPC · JPL |
| 592978 | 2015 FP_{150} | — | March 26, 2006 | Mount Lemmon | Mount Lemmon Survey | · | 1.4 km | MPC · JPL |
| 592979 | 2015 FZ_{150} | — | September 25, 2008 | Mount Lemmon | Mount Lemmon Survey | L4 | 9.5 km | MPC · JPL |
| 592980 | 2015 FA_{151} | — | September 29, 2008 | Kitt Peak | Spacewatch | · | 1.4 km | MPC · JPL |
| 592981 | 2015 FY_{151} | — | March 17, 2015 | Mount Lemmon | Mount Lemmon Survey | · | 1.6 km | MPC · JPL |
| 592982 | 2015 FM_{153} | — | March 2, 2006 | Kitt Peak | Spacewatch | · | 1.2 km | MPC · JPL |
| 592983 | 2015 FM_{154} | — | April 24, 2011 | Mount Lemmon | Mount Lemmon Survey | EUN | 1.2 km | MPC · JPL |
| 592984 | 2015 FU_{157} | — | December 31, 2013 | Mount Lemmon | Mount Lemmon Survey | · | 1.6 km | MPC · JPL |
| 592985 | 2015 FD_{159} | — | November 7, 2008 | Mount Lemmon | Mount Lemmon Survey | · | 1.5 km | MPC · JPL |
| 592986 | 2015 FK_{160} | — | January 10, 2013 | Kitt Peak | Spacewatch | L4 | 6.2 km | MPC · JPL |
| 592987 | 2015 FF_{161} | — | September 21, 2012 | Mount Lemmon | Mount Lemmon Survey | AGN | 950 m | MPC · JPL |
| 592988 | 2015 FP_{162} | — | October 20, 2003 | Kitt Peak | Spacewatch | · | 1.6 km | MPC · JPL |
| 592989 | 2015 FV_{165} | — | October 17, 2010 | Mount Lemmon | Mount Lemmon Survey | L4 | 8.8 km | MPC · JPL |
| 592990 | 2015 FM_{166} | — | March 21, 2015 | Haleakala | Pan-STARRS 1 | · | 950 m | MPC · JPL |
| 592991 | 2015 FZ_{166} | — | December 24, 2013 | Catalina | CSS | EUN | 1.1 km | MPC · JPL |
| 592992 | 2015 FC_{167} | — | March 26, 2006 | Mount Lemmon | Mount Lemmon Survey | · | 1.5 km | MPC · JPL |
| 592993 | 2015 FO_{170} | — | December 3, 2005 | Kitt Peak | Spacewatch | (5) | 1.1 km | MPC · JPL |
| 592994 | 2015 FQ_{170} | — | September 22, 2003 | Kitt Peak | Spacewatch | AGN | 1.0 km | MPC · JPL |
| 592995 | 2015 FT_{170} | — | November 30, 2010 | Mount Lemmon | Mount Lemmon Survey | L4 | 6.8 km | MPC · JPL |
| 592996 | 2015 FU_{170} | — | March 21, 2015 | Haleakala | Pan-STARRS 1 | H | 440 m | MPC · JPL |
| 592997 | 2015 FC_{172} | — | November 14, 2010 | Kitt Peak | Spacewatch | L4 | 8.3 km | MPC · JPL |
| 592998 | 2015 FK_{172} | — | September 14, 2002 | Palomar | NEAT | · | 1.7 km | MPC · JPL |
| 592999 | 2015 FK_{173} | — | October 11, 2012 | Mount Lemmon | Mount Lemmon Survey | · | 2.0 km | MPC · JPL |
| 593000 | 2015 FO_{175} | — | May 8, 2011 | Mount Lemmon | Mount Lemmon Survey | HNS | 1.4 km | MPC · JPL |

back to top

== Meaning of names ==
As minor planet discoveries are confirmed, they are given a permanent number by the IAU's Minor Planet Center (MPC), and the discoverers can then submit names for them, following the IAU's naming conventions. The list below concerns those minor planets in the specified number-range that have received names, and explains the meanings of those names.

Official naming citations of newly named small Solar System bodies are approved and published in a bulletin by IAU's Working Group for Small Bodies Nomenclature (WGSBN). Before May 2021, citations were published in MPC's Minor Planet Circulars for many decades. Recent citations can also be found on the JPL Small-Body Database (SBDB). Until his death in 2016, German astronomer Lutz D. Schmadel compiled these citations into the Dictionary of Minor Planet Names (DMP) and regularly updated the collection.

Based on Paul Herget's The Names of the Minor Planets, Schmadel also researched the unclear origin of numerous asteroids, most of which had been named prior to World War II. This article incorporates text from this source, which is in the public domain: SBDB New namings may only be added to this list below after official publication as the preannouncement of names is condemned. The WGSBN publishes a comprehensive guideline for the naming rules of non-cometary small Solar System bodies.

| Named minor planet | Provisional | This minor planet was named for... | Ref · Catalog |
|---|---|---|---|
| 592170 Arkadyinin | 2014 QK_{20} | Arkady Inin (born 1938), Russian screenwriter. | IAU · 592170 |
| 592244 Daukantas | 2014 QF_{439} | Simonas Daukantas (1793–1864) was a Lithuanian historian, writer, and ethnographer. One of the pioneers of the Lithuanian National Revival, he is credited as the author of the first book on the history of Lithuania written in the Lithuanian language. | IAU · 592244 |
| 592710 Lenghu | 2015 BL_{563} | Lenghu is a region on the Tibetan Plateau in Qinghai Province of China. Due to its high altitude, extreme dryness and minimal light pollution, Lenghu is known as one of the best astronomical sites in the world. Several large astronomical facilities, including telescopes of Purple Mountain Observatory, have been sited there. | IAU · 592710 |
| 592750 Seiichifujiwara | 2015 CB_{51} | Seiichi Fujiwara (b. 1950), a Japanese karate master | IAU · 592750 |
