= Xiezuo Lake =

Lake in Qinghai Province, China

- 协作湖 (Chinese)
- Location within Qinghai
- Location: Dulan County; Haixi Prefecture; Qinghai Province; China
- Coordinates: 36°57′43.5″N 95°36′16.5″E
- Type: Endorheic saline lake
- Primary inflows: Quanji River
- Basin countries: China
- Surface area: 17 km^{2} (6.6 sq mi)
- Surface elevation: 2,680 m (8,790 ft)

Xiezuo Lake
- Traditional Chinese: 協作湖
- Simplified Chinese: 协作湖
- Literal meaning: Cooperation Lake; Working-Together Lake
Transcriptions
Standard Mandarin
- Hanyu Pinyin: Xiézuò Hú
- Wade–Giles: Hsieh-tso Hu

Xiezuo Lake (Note: Misspelled "Xiezhuo" in Spencer & al., Lowenstein & al., and others.) is a lake in the northeastern Qarhan Playa north of Golmud in Dulan County, Haixi Prefecture, Qinghai Province, China. Like the other lakes of the surrounding Qaidam Basin, it is extremely saline.

== Geography ==
Xiezuo Lake lies at the northern edge of the Qaidam subbasin of the eastern Qarhan Playa at an elevation of 2,680 m (8,790 ft) or 2,691 m (8,829 ft). It has an area of about 17 km^{2} (6.6 sq mi). It lies northeast of Dabusun Lake, north of Tuanjie Lake, and west of North Hulsan Lake and is periodically fed by the Quanji River (全集河, Quánjí Hé) and mineral springs from the north. Although the volume of water from the springs is much smaller, their much higher concentration of solutes is important to the lake's chemical composition. The lake's depth usually does not exceed 1 m (3 ft 3 in).

The crescent shape of the lake reflects its bed's origin as the alluvial fan of a now-dry river.

== Gallery ==
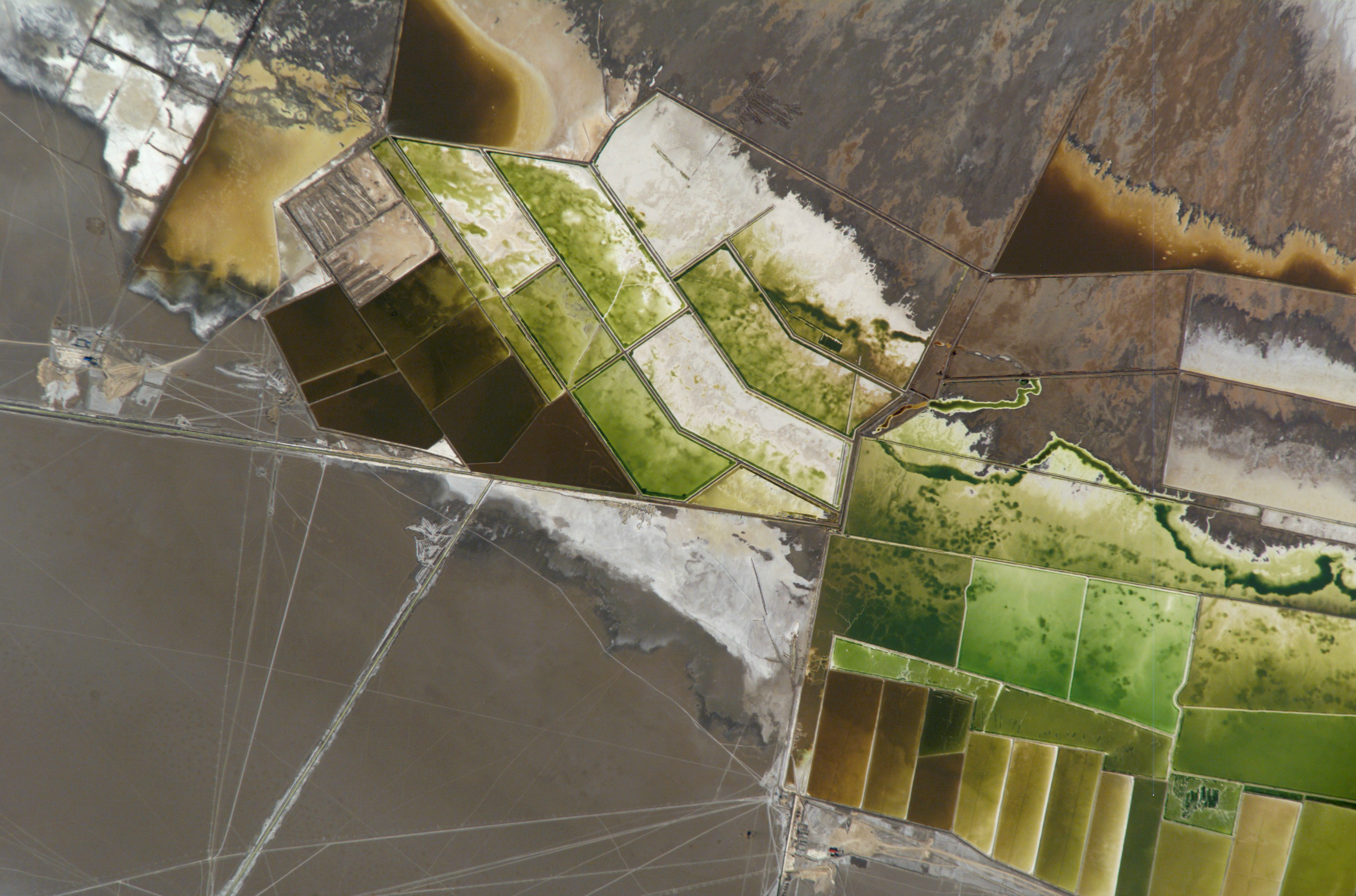
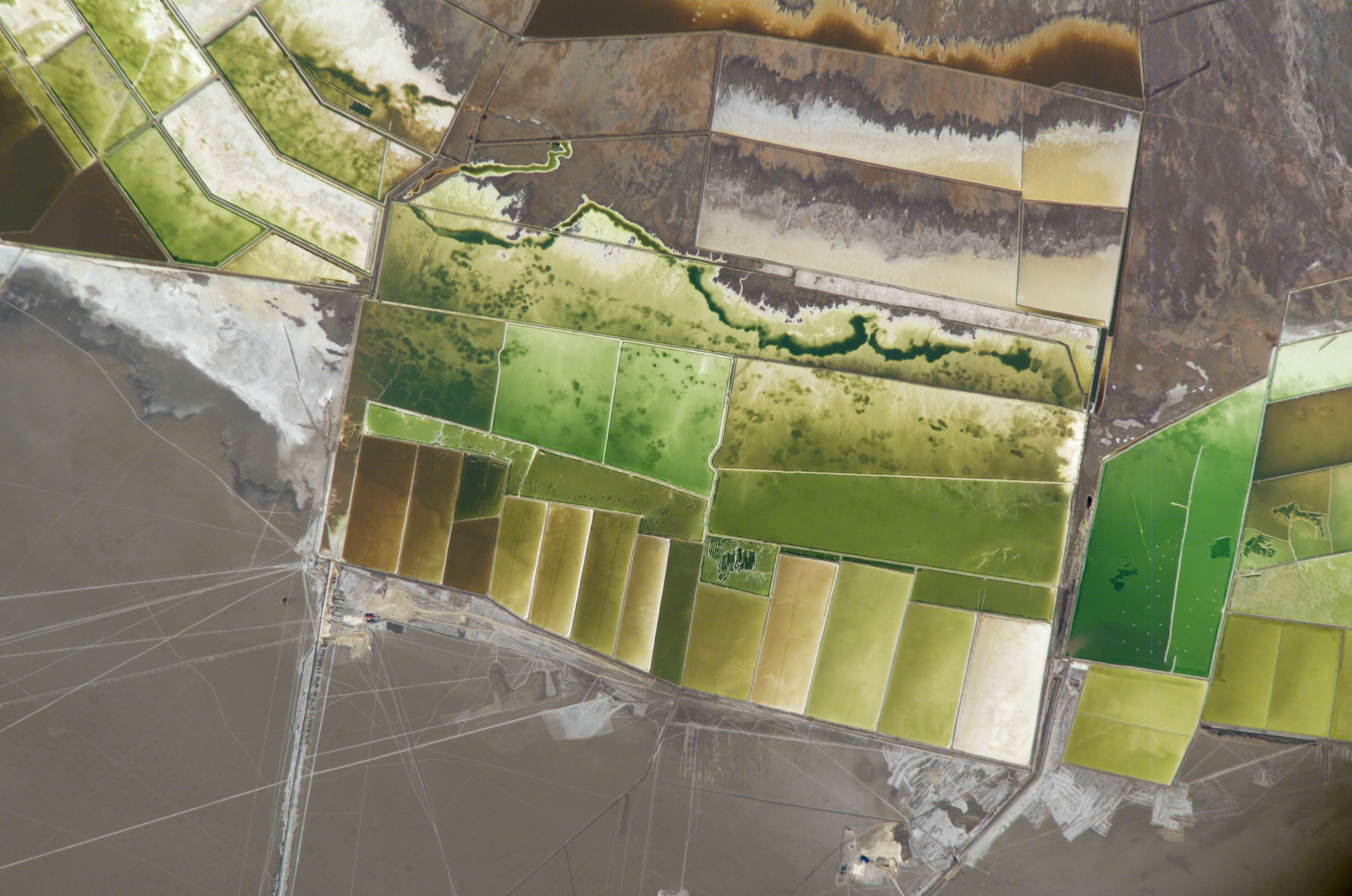
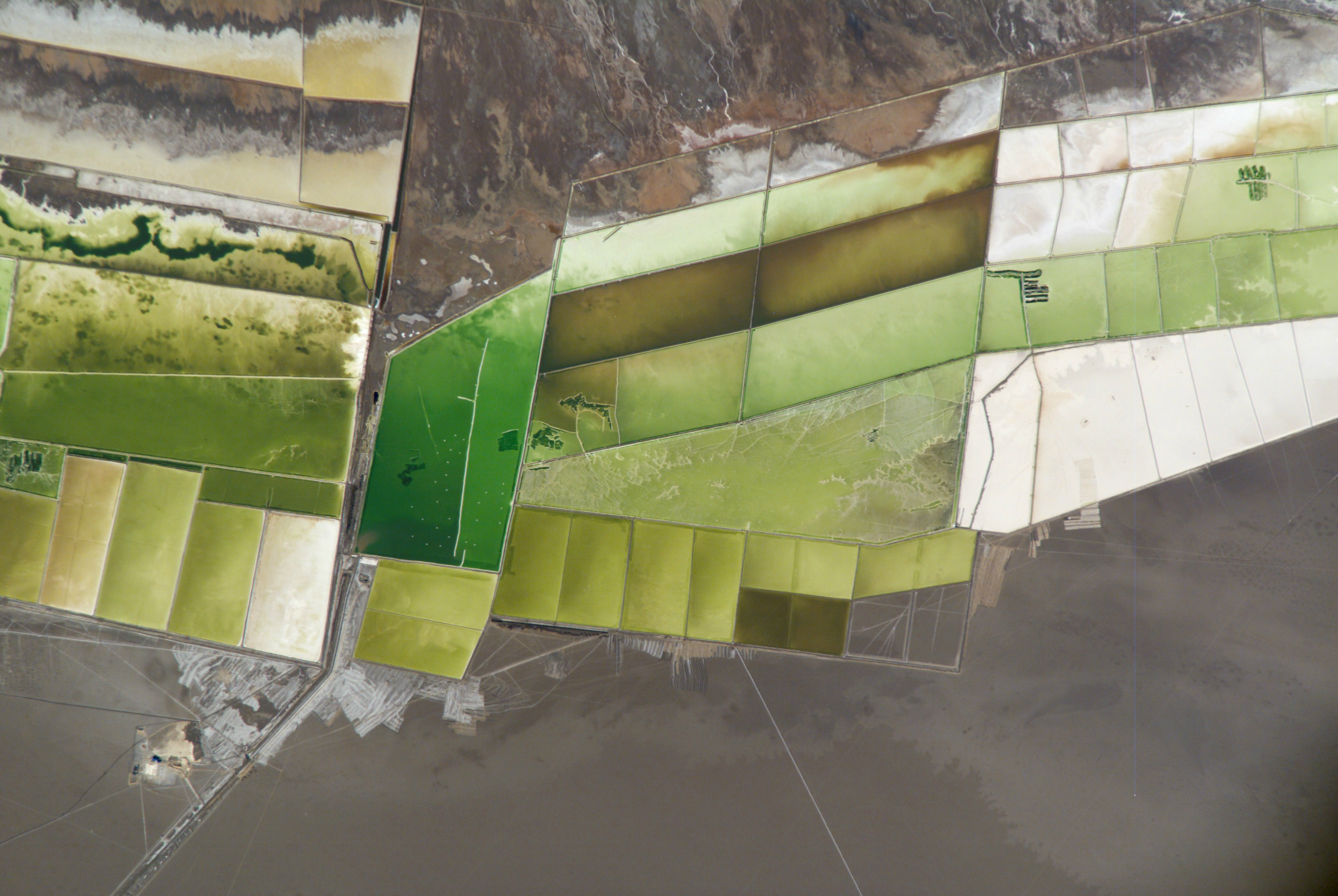
Photographs of the large salt pans in and around Xiezuo Lake taken by a member of Expedition 16 from the International Space Station (2007)

== See also ==
- Qarhan Playa & Qaidam Basin
- List of lakes and saltwater lakes of China
