= Dongling Lake =

- 东陵湖 (Chinese)
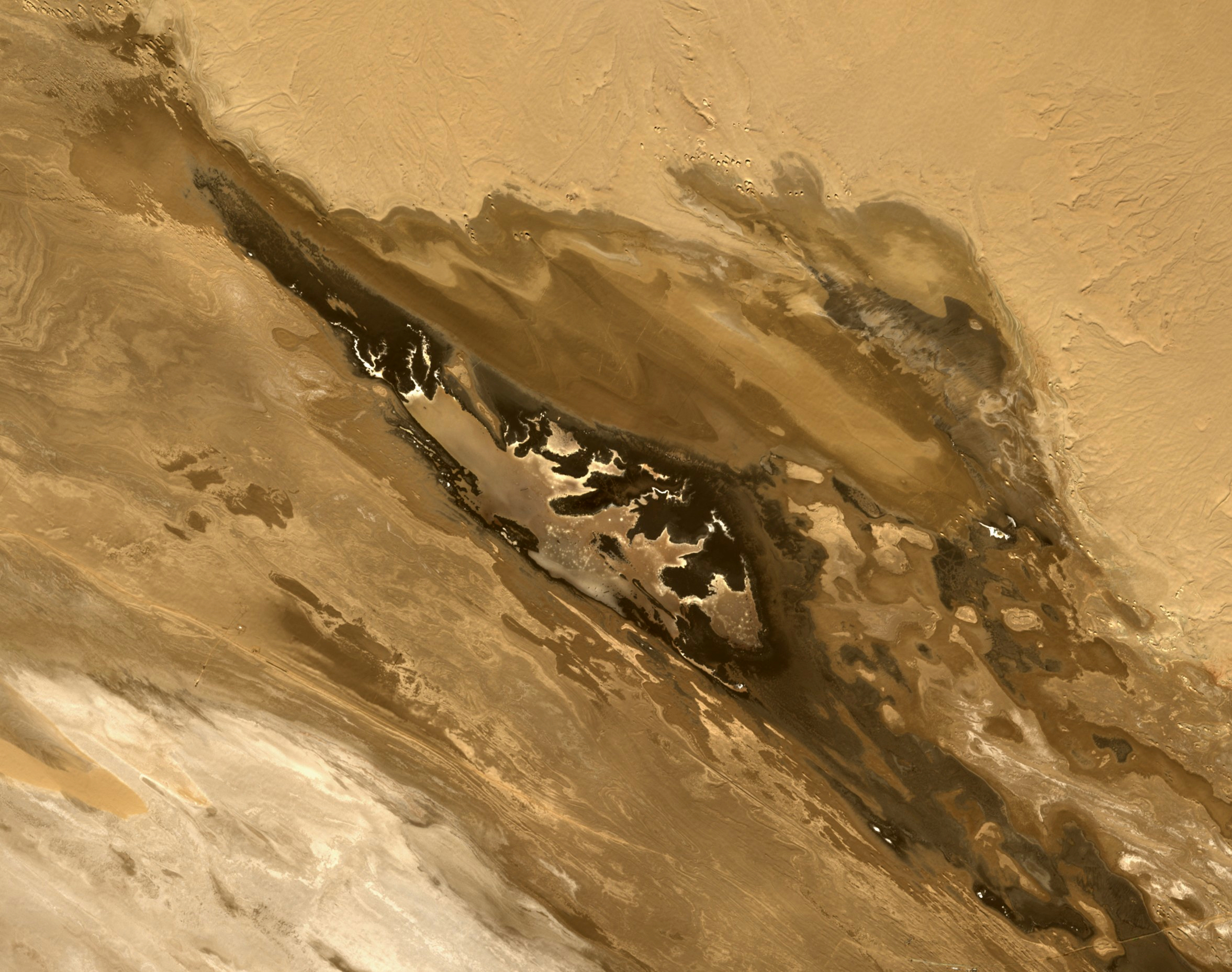
- Sentinel-2 image (2017)

- Location within Qinghai
- Location: Golmud County; Haixi Prefecture; Qinghai Province; China
- Coordinates: 37°17′58″N 94°49′19.5″E
- Type: Endorheic saline lake
- Basin countries: China
- Surface area: 7.2 km^{2} (2.8 sq mi)
- Surface elevation: 2,690.3 m (8,826 ft)

Dongling Lake
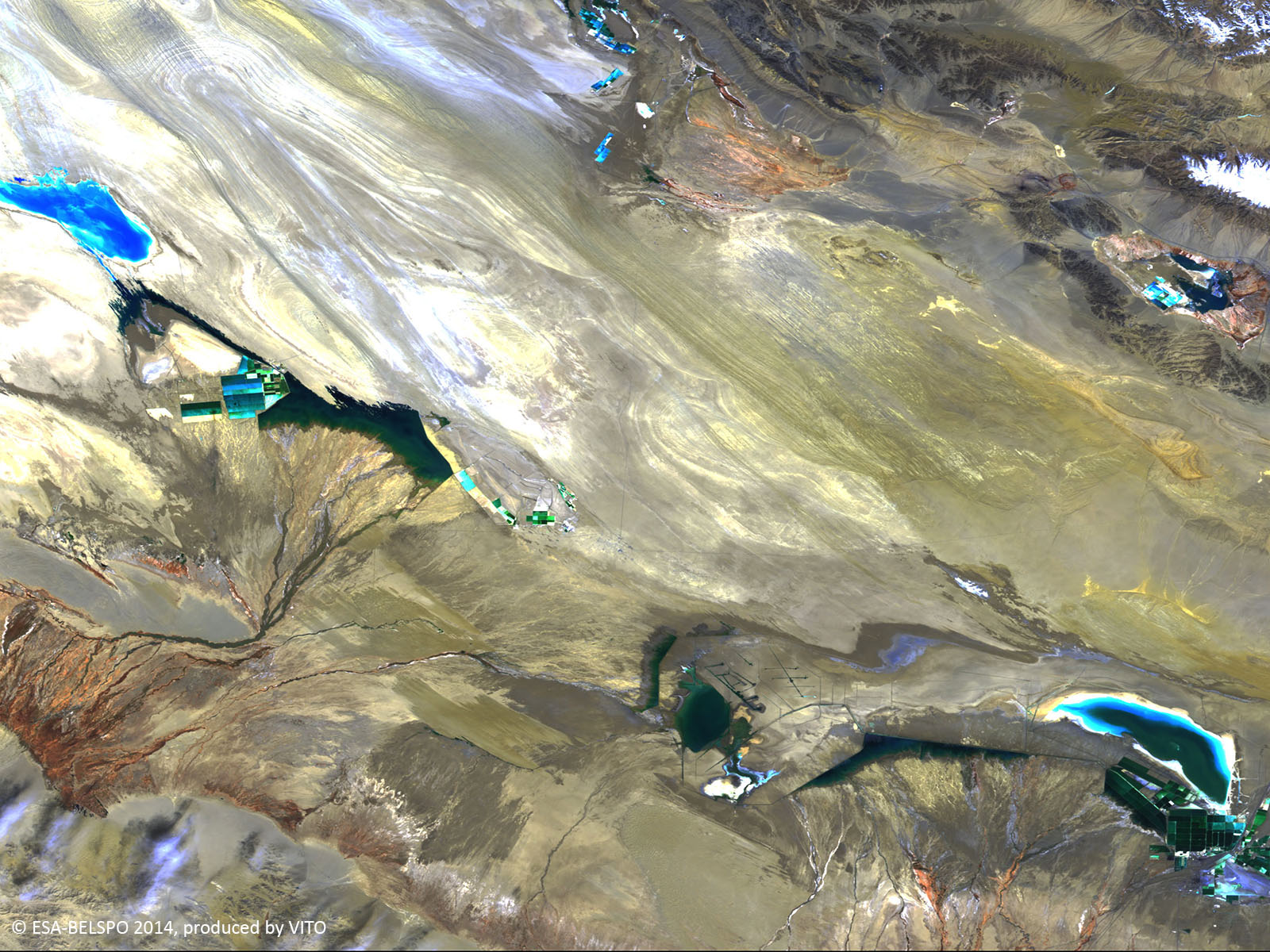
- The Sanhu Depression in 2014, with Dongling Lake in the SE north of Dabusun Lake (ESA)
- Traditional Chinese: 東陵湖
- Simplified Chinese: 东陵湖
Transcriptions
Standard Mandarin
- Hanyu Pinyin: Dōnglíng Hú
- Wade–Giles: Tung-ling Hu

Dongling Lake (Note: Misspelled "Donglin" in Spencer & al., Lowenstein & al., and others) is a lake in the Qarhan Playa north of Golmud in the Haixi Prefecture of Qinghai Province in northwestern China. Like the other lakes of the surrounding Qaidam Basin, it is extremely saline.

== Geography ==
Dongling Lake lies on the north edge of the Qarhan Playa at an elevation of 2,690.3 m (8,826 ft) above sea level. It has an area of 7.2 km^{2} (2.8 sq mi). Its depth does not usually exceed 1 m (3 ft 3 in).

Dongling's position at the northern end of the playa means that its waters are far more influenced by the mineral springs and their high concentrations of solutes.

== See also ==
- Qarhan Playa & Qaidam Basin
- List of lakes and saltwater lakes of China
