= Tuanjie Lake =

Lake in Qinghai Province, China

- 团结湖 (Chinese)
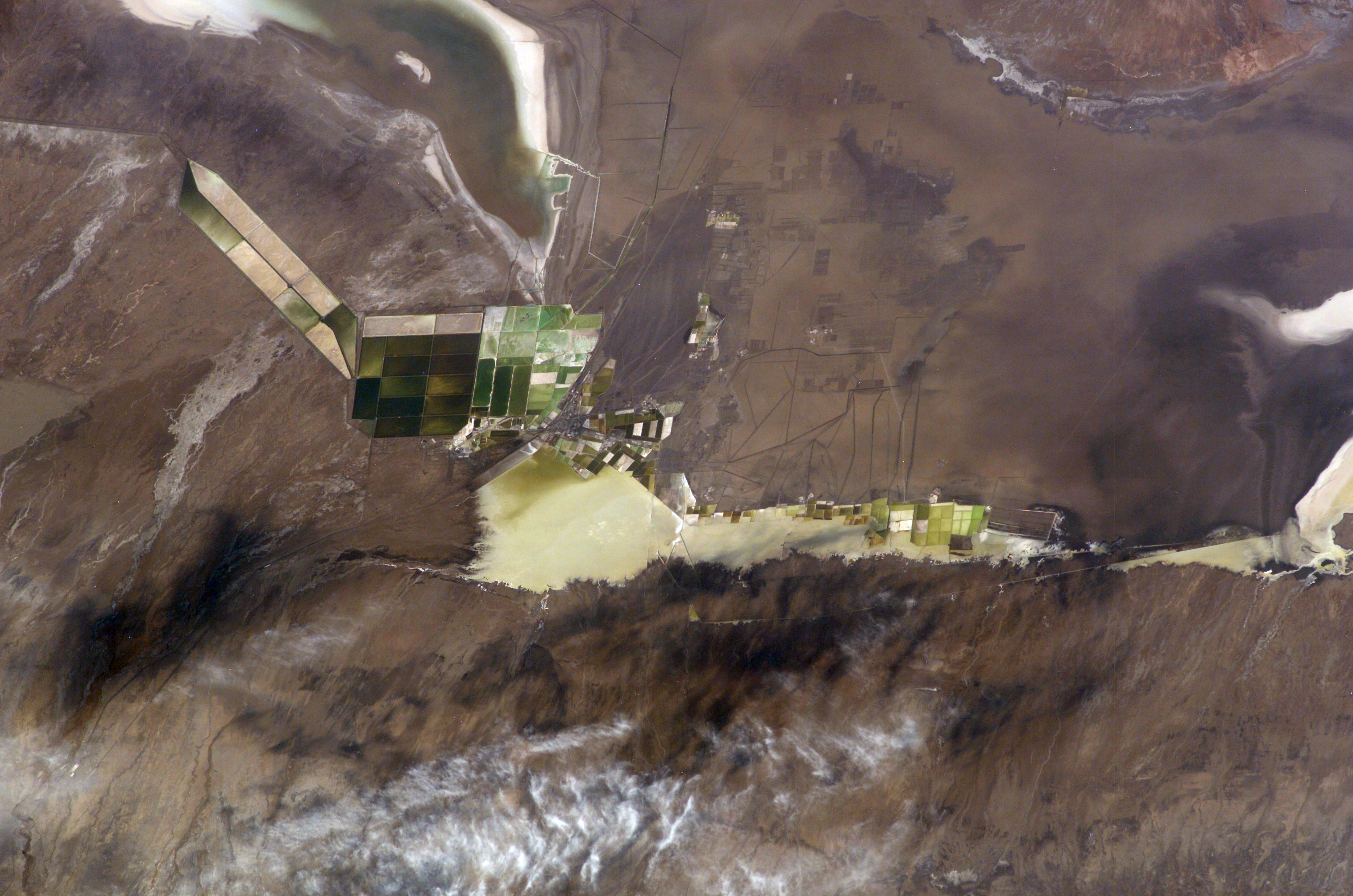
- Tuanjie Lake in 2003, surrounded with salt pans. The town of Qarhan and Lake Dabusun are visible to the NW.

- Location within Qinghai
- Location: Golmud County; Haixi Prefecture; Qinghai Province; China
- Coordinates: 36°43′50″N 95°21′42.5″E
- Type: Endorheic saline lake
- Primary inflows: Shougong River
- Basin countries: China
- Surface area: 6 km^{2} (2.3 sq mi)
- Surface elevation: 2,675 m (8,776 ft)

Tuanjie Lake
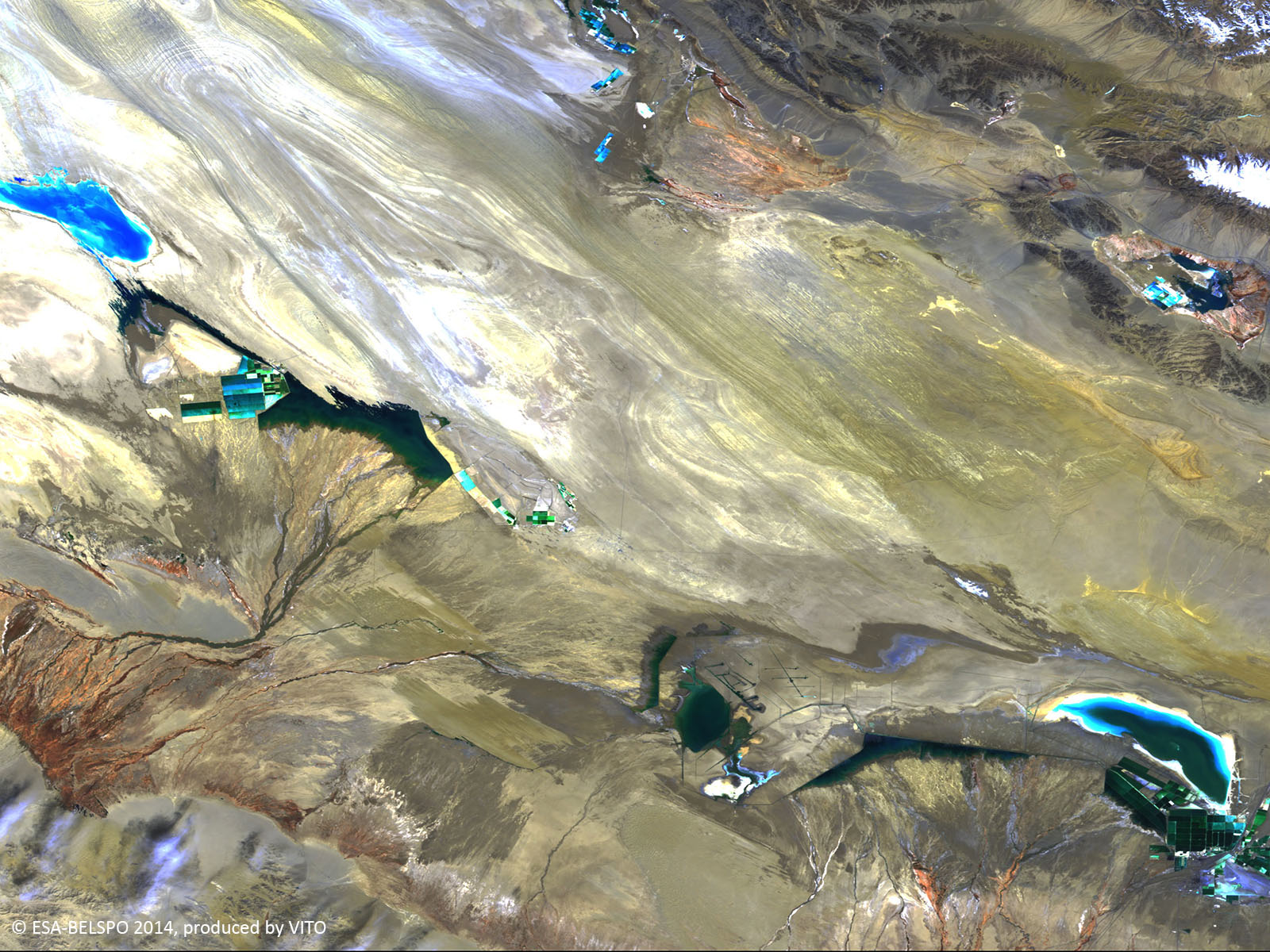
- The Sanhu Depression in 2014, with Tuanjie in the extreme SE (ESA)
- Traditional Chinese: 團結湖
- Simplified Chinese: 团结湖
- Literal meaning: Solidarity Lake; Unity Lake
Transcriptions
Standard Mandarin
- Hanyu Pinyin: Tuánjié Hú
- Wade–Giles: T‘uan-chieh Hu

Tuanjie Lake is a lake in the southeastern Qarhan Playa north of Golmud in the Haixi Prefecture of Qinghai Province in northwestern China. It is fed from the south by the Shougong River. Like the other lakes of the surrounding Qaidam Basin, it is extremely saline.

== Geography ==
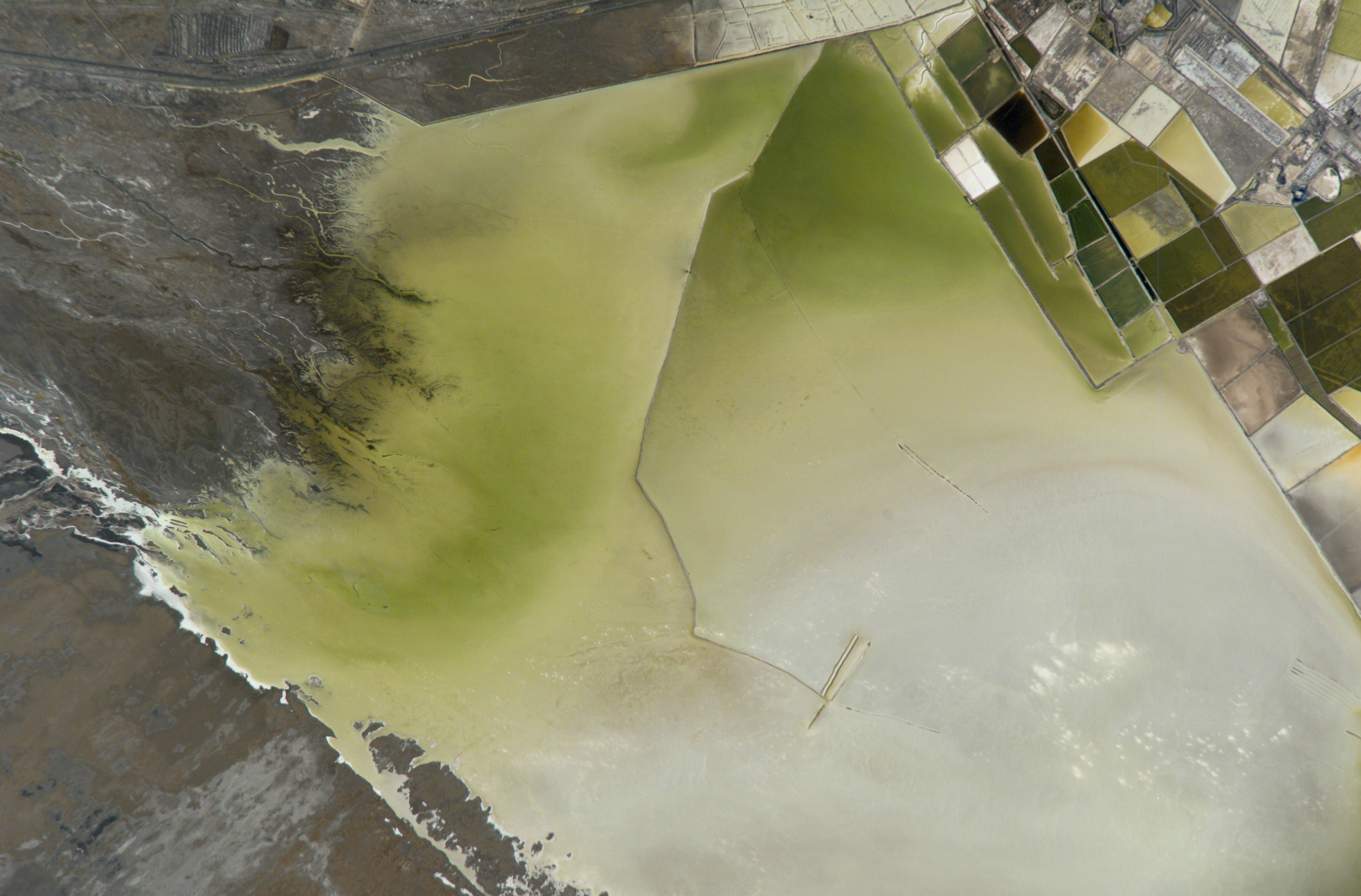
Tuanjie Lake and the surrounding salt pans (2007)

Tuanjie Lake at the southern edge of the Qaidam subbasin in the eastern Qarhan Playa at an elevation of 2,675 m (8,776 ft) above sea level. It has an area of 6 km^{2} (2.3 sq mi). It lies southeast of Dabusun Lake, south of Xiezuo Lake, and west of South Hulsan Lake and is fed by the intermittent stream of the Shougong River (收工河, Shōugōng Hé). Its depth usually does not exceed 1 m (3 ft 3 in).

Tuanjie's position at the south end of the playa means that its waters are relatively less influenced by the concentrated mineral springs along the playa's northern boundary. Nonetheless, the lake's brine is at or near saturation with calcite, halite, polyhalite, kieserite, and (importantly) carnallite, which is processed to produce potash for potassium-rich fertilizers and other uses.

== See also ==
- Qarhan Playa & Qaidam Basin
- List of lakes and saltwater lakes of China
