= Hulsan Lake =

Hulsan, Huobuxun, or Huoluxun Lake may refer to:

- North Hulsan Lake
- South Hulsan Lake
