= North Hulsan Lake =

Lake in Qinghai Province, China

- 北霍布逊湖 (in Chinese); ᠬᠣᠶᠢᠳᠤ ᠬᠤᠯᠤᠰᠤ ᠨᠠᠭᠤᠷ (in Mongolian)
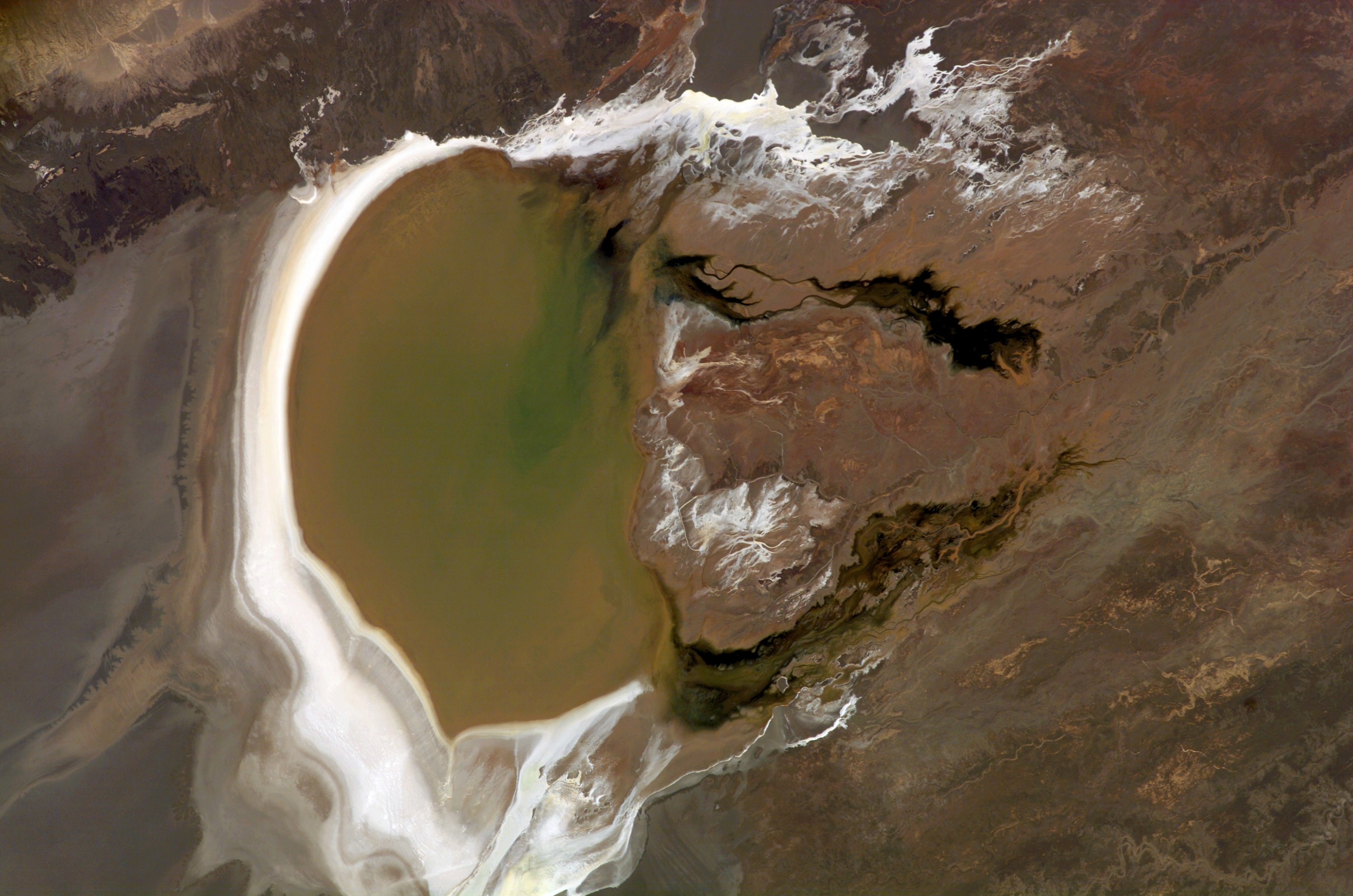
- View of lake taken during ISS Expedition 13

- Location within Qinghai
- Location: Dulan County; Haixi Prefecture; Qinghai Province; China
- Coordinates: 36°54′30″N 95°54′28″E
- Type: Endorheic saline lake
- Primary inflows: Qaidam River
- Basin countries: China
- Surface area: 52–90 km^{2} (20–35 sq mi)
- Surface elevation: 2,675 m (8,780 ft)

North Hulsan Lake

North Huobuxun
- Traditional Chinese: 北霍布遜湖
- Simplified Chinese: 北霍布逊湖
Transcriptions
Standard Mandarin
- Hanyu Pinyin: Běihuòbùxùn Hú; Běi Huòbùxùn Hú
- Wade–Giles: Pei-huo-pu-hsün Hu; Pei Huo-pu-hsün Hu

North Huoluxun
- Traditional Chinese: 北霍魯遜湖
- Simplified Chinese: 北霍鲁逊湖
- Literal meaning: North Hulsan Lake
Transcriptions
Standard Mandarin
- Hanyu Pinyin: Běihuòlǔxùn Hú; Běi Huòlǔxùn Hú
- Wade–Giles: Pei-huo-lu-hsün Hu; Pei Huo-lu-hsün Hu

Mongolian name
- Mongolian script: ᠬᠣᠶᠢᠳᠤ ᠬᠤᠯᠤᠰᠤ ᠨᠠᠭᠤᠷ
Transcriptions
- SASM/GNC: Qoyidu Qulusu Naɣur

North or Bei Hulsan Lake, also known by other names, is a lake northeast of Golmud in Dulan County, Haixi Prefecture, Qinghai Province, China. A part of the Qarhan Playa, it is filled from the east by the Qaidam River. Like the other lakes of the surrounding Qaidam Basin, it is extremely saline.

== Name ==
Hulsan or Hollusun Nor is a romanization of the Mongolian name meaning "Reed Lake", from their former abundance in the area. The adjective "north" distinguishes it from nearby South Hulsan Lake. Huoluxun and Huobuxun (Note: Misspelled "Huobusun" in Spencer & al., Lowenstein & al., and others and "Hobuxun" by Garrett.) are the pinyin romanizations of the Mandarin pronunciation of the same name's transcriptions into Chinese characters. Bei Hulsan or Beihuobuxun is the same name, prefixed with the Chinese word for "North".

== Geography ==
North Hulsan Lake lies in the northern Hulsan subbasin at the eastern edge of the Qarhan Playa in the southeastern corner of the Qaidam Basin at an elevation of 2,675 m (8,780 ft). It lies east of Xiezuo Lake and north of South Hulsan Lake. It was reported by Zheng in 1997 as usually about 90.4 km^{2} (35 sq mi), and by Zhang & al. in 2014 as 82.49 km^{2} (32 sq mi), but by Zhou & al. as varying between dry and wet years from 52.55–88.21 km^{2} (20–34 sq mi). North Hulsan Lake is chiefly fed from the east by the Qaidam River (t 柴達木河, s 柴达木河, Cháidámù Hé). In the area's hyperarid climate, there is generally only 28–40 mm (1–2 in) of annual rainfall but about 3,000 mm (120 in) of annual evaporation. It is never more than about 1 m (3 ft 3 in) deep. An inflow from the north by mineral springs in the playa's northern karst zone contribute a smaller volume of water but its much higher solute concentration greatly affects the lake and its sediments. North Hulsan Lake's sediments have a relatively higher potassium content than most other lakes in the playa.

== History ==
North Hulsan Lake has been greatly affected by the rapid expansion of the industrial processing of Qarhan's salt lakes for potassium and other valuable minerals since 2000. Fang & al. found it had lost 8.1 Gt (8.9 billion short tons) of water between 1995 and 2015, and Zhou & al. reported that the lake proper could not be distinguished at all from the surrounding salt pans in satellite imagery as of 2014.

== See also ==
- Qarhan Playa and Qaidam Basin
- List of lakes and saltwater lakes of China
