= Qarhan Playa =

Playa in Qinghai Province, China

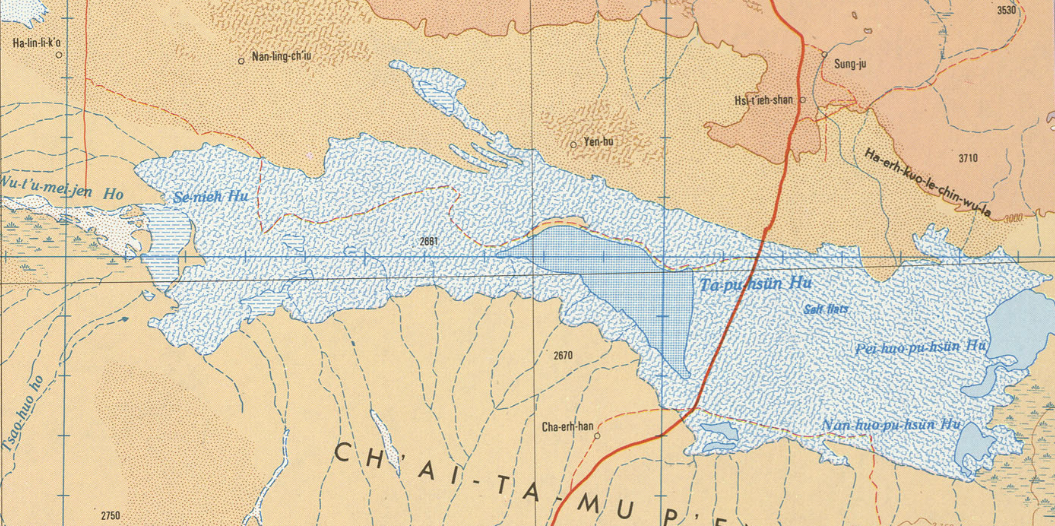
- A map of the Qarhan Playa (1975), showing its lakes Suli ("Se-nieh"), Dabusun ("Ta pu-hsün"), and N. ("Pei") and S. Hulsan ("Nan huo Pu-hsün")

- Location within Qinghai
- Location: Golmud & Dulan counties Haixi Prefecture; Qinghai Province; China
- Coordinates: 37°01′27″N 95°08′20″E
- Type: Salt flat
- Primary inflows: Golmud River
- Basin countries: China
- Max. length: 160 km (100 mi)
- Max. width: 20–40 km (12–25 mi)
- Surface area: 5,856 km^{2} (2,261 sq mi)
- Surface elevation: 2,677 m (8,780 ft)

Qarhan Playa
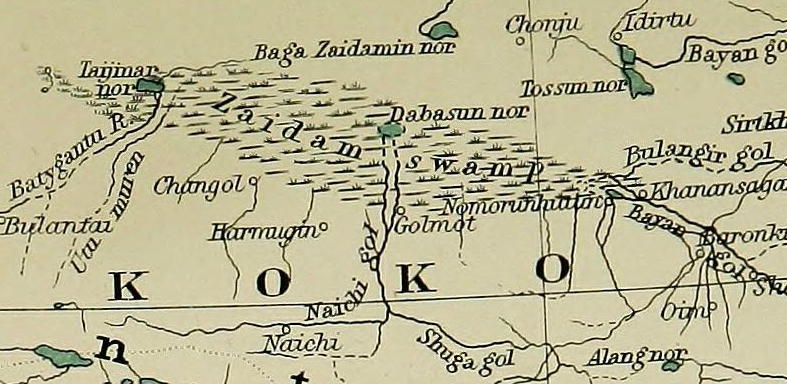
- "Zaidam Swamp" in 1917, with names given in Postal Map Romanization
- Traditional Chinese: 察爾汗䀋湖
- Simplified Chinese: 察尔汗盐湖
- Literal meaning: Qarhan Salt Lake
Transcriptions
Standard Mandarin
- Hanyu Pinyin: Chá'ěrhán Yánhú
- Wade–Giles: Chʻa²-êrh³-han² Yen²-hu²

Former transcription
- Chinese: 察罕
- Literal meaning: Qarhan
Transcriptions
Standard Mandarin
- Hanyu Pinyin: Cháhǎn
- Wade–Giles: Cha-han

Sanhu
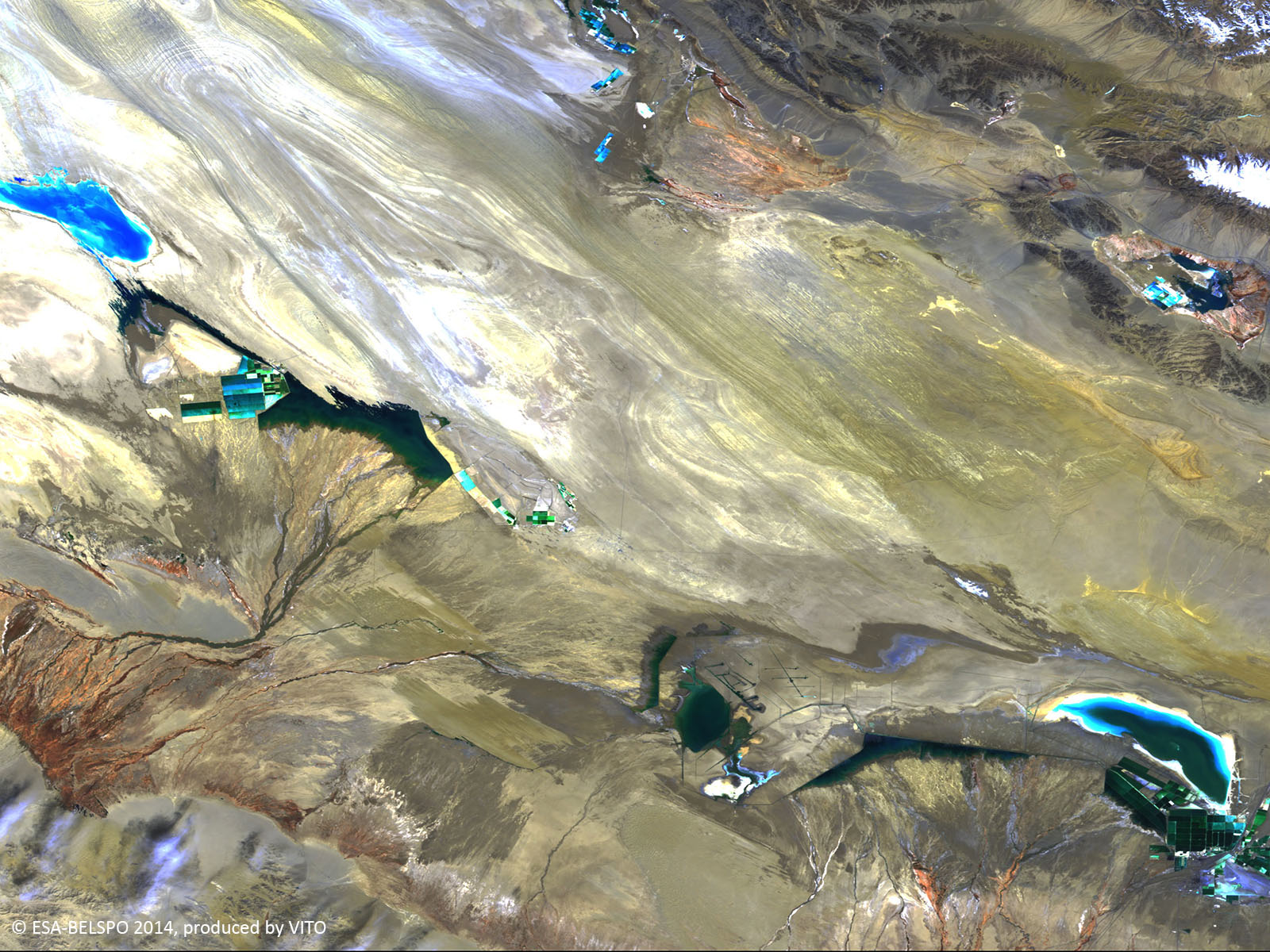
- The Sanhu area (2014) with the two Taijinar lakes to the northwest (ESA)
- Chinese: 三湖
- Literal meaning: The Three Lakes
Transcriptions
Standard Mandarin
- Hanyu Pinyin: Sānhú
- Wade–Giles: San Hu

Qarhan National Mining Park
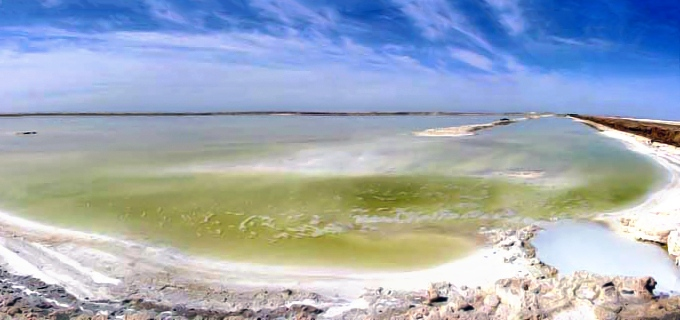
- Dabusun Lake, the largest lake in the playa, sometimes misleadingly also called "Qarhan Lake", beside the mining park museum
- Traditional Chinese: 格爾木察爾汗鹽湖國家礦山公園
- Simplified Chinese: 格尔木察尔汗盐湖国家矿山公园
- Literal meaning: Qarhan Salt Lake National Mining Park in Golmud
Transcriptions
Standard Mandarin
- Hanyu Pinyin: Gé'ěrmù Chá'ěrhán Yánhú Guójiā Kuàngshān Gōngyuán
- Wade–Giles: Ko-erh-mu Ch‘a-erh-han Yen-hu Kuo-chia K‘uang-shan Kung-yüan

The Qarhan Playa or Salt Plain, also misleadingly described as Qarhan Lake, is a playa in the Golmud and Dulan counties of Haixi Prefecture, Qinghai, China. Formerly a single unitary lake, it is now an expansive salt flat divided into four greater sections (Dabusun, Big/Small Bieletan, Suli, and N./S. Huoluxun) which contain a number of smaller salt lakes, the largest of which is Dabusun Lake. The area is heavily exploited for its valuable salt, mineral, and rare earth reserves but parts are also protected as a national park and contribute to regional tourism.

== Name ==
Qarhan is the GNC romanization of the area's Mongolian name, originally derived from the word for "white" (Modern Mongolian: цагаан, tsagaan, or ᠴᠠᠭᠠᠨ, čaɣan). Cha'erhan is the pinyin romanization of the Mandarin pronunciation of 察爾汗, a modification of the original transcription into Chinese characters of the same name; it is also sometimes clipped into Charhan in English sources. The Chinese name, which does not distinguish between actual salt lakes and playas, also causes the playa to be called a "lake" or even "the largest salt lake in China" in less careful English sources.

== Geography ==
The Qarhan Playa covers an area of 5,856 km^{2} (2,261 sq mi), stretching over 160 km (100 mi) east to west and usually between 20–40 km (12–25 mi) north to south. The southwest lies in Golmud and the northeast in Dulan County, both in Haixi Prefecture, Qinghai, China. The roughly 60,000 km^{2} (23,000 sq mi) area of Qarhan inclusive of Taijinar to its west is sometimes known as the Sanhu ("Three Lakes"), after the two Taijinar lakes, Suli Lake, and Dabusun. (Note: Yang & al. and others mistakenly replace Suli with the better-known two Hulsan lakes. Xiao & al. and others mistakenly replace Dabusun with West Taijinar.) Qarhan is part of the larger Qaidam Basin, lying between the Kunlun Mountains to the south, the Altun to the west, and the Qilian to the north. Qarhan's lakes lie between 2,675–2,680 m (8,780–8,790 ft) above sea level, with Dabusun and North Hulsan being the lowest and Xiezuo being the highest. The effect of elevation is such that despite lying on the same latitude as Greece, Algeria, and Virginia in the United States, Qarhan has a mean annual temperature of 0.1 °C (32.2 °F). The mean air speed is 4.3 m/s (9.6 mph), and the mean relative humidity is 27.7%.

In the playa's hyperarid climate, there is generally only 28–40 mm (1–2 in) of annual rainfall but 3,000–3,564 mm (118.1–140.3 in) of annual evaporation. Despite this, meltwater rivers and mineral springs fill the basins of the salt flat's four main sections—Bieletan, Dabusun, Qarhan, and Huoluxun—with about ten large but shallow lakes usually collectively occupying an area of about 460 km^{2} (180 sq mi): Suli Lake in the west, fed from the west by the Urt Moron; the Little and Big Biele Lakes beside it, fed from the south by the Tuolahai and Qingshui Rivers; West Dabusun and Dabusun Lake (the largest), in the center, fed from the south by the Golmud River; Dongling Lake to their northwest; Xiezuo and Tuanjie Lakes to their east, fed respectively by the intermittent Quanji and Shougong Rivers; and North and South Hulsan Lakes at the east end of the playa, fed from the east by the Qaidam, Nuomuhong, and Suolinguole Rivers. All of these are usually less than 1 m (3 ft 3 in) deep. There are also some ephemeral lakes. Most of the streams contributing to these lakes flow north into the playa from the Kunlun and its foothills. The Golmud River is the main contributor, providing a mean annual influx of 19.2 trillion L (5.07 trillion gal) of water. There is also contribution of about 1% from mineral springs, especially on the north end of the playa, which play an important role in the chemical composition of the sediment.

The local flora consists of sparse forbs (particularly members of Chenopodioideae) and shrubs, especially members of Ephedra and Tamarix.

== Geology ==
Most of the Qarhan Playa is solid halite underlain by a layer of brine to about 1.3 m (4 ft 3 in) under the soil, and it holds enormous reserves of salt, with solid layers extending between 2–20 m (6 ft 7 in – 65 ft 7 in). The 50 billion metric tons (55 billion short tons) are estimated sufficient to meet present world demand for 1,000 years. The area around Dabusun Lake has halite to depths of at least 40 m (130 ft), although with alternating layers of mud in places. The salinity of the playa's lakes varies between 164.81 and 359.50 g/L (1.3–3 lb/gal); their pH values are between 5.4 and 7.85.

Other minerals include potash, carnallite (potassium magnesium chloride), calcium chloride, magnesium, lithium, boron, iodine, and sylvite. The basin is one of China's richest sources for potassium, with an estimated 360 million metric tons (400 million short tons) of potassium oxide. Its reserves are also important as the world's largest present-day accumulation of potassium-rich salt in the world, which helped scientists better understand the chemical and evaporation pathways involved in the creation of natural potash and disprove previous suppositions that it only formed in marine environments. The Bieletan subbasin in the west is the richest source of brine lithium in China, with an estimated reserve of 7.74 million metric tons (8.53 million short tons) of lithium chloride. The Sanhu as a whole holds 83% of the country's known lithium reserves, with some areas having concentrations of 330 ppm.

== History ==
Paleoclimatologists believe that the playa's basin was created by tectonic activity during the Mesozoic. Between 770,000 and 30,000 years ago the basin constituted an enormous lake, which alternated nine times between being a fresh- and saltwater lake. Pollen studies suggest that the area of the lake bed which now underlies Dabusun was raised around 700 m (2,300 ft) in just the last 500,000 years. Tectonic activity also shifted the lake's tributaries and basins, although it remained with the present-day playa during this period. At around 30,000 years ago, this great freshwater lake spread over at least 25,000 km^{2} (9,700 sq mi) with a surface 50–60 m (160–200 ft) above the present levels of its successors, making it one of the largest lakes in the world. It was cut off and became saline again around 30,000 years ago and began precipitating salts about 25,000 years ago. It has been shrinking in size by evaporation for most of that time, eventually separating into the current separate lakes.

Until the recent commercial exploitation of the salts and other minerals, the district remained largely unpopulated, as the salt deposits made it difficult for the nomads of northwestern China to use the area for their herds.

National geological expeditions began investigating Qinghai in the 1950s, shortly after the establishment of the People's Republic of China. The major expedition to the Qarhan Playa was undertaken in 1955–6, but the area's important carnallite (and thus potassium) reserves were discovered accidentally by geologists Zheng Mianping and Liu Dagang during a stroll on 2 October 1957. The next year, an exploratory well discovered the Yanhu Gas Field north of Dabusun Lake. Over the next decade, more detailed surveying and prospecting were undertaken while China continued to depend on Canadian imports for its potash. Commercial exploitation of the basin's own potash began in 1989, following the expansion of the PRC's Opening Up and Reform Policy. The opening of the Qinghai Potash Fertilizer Factory increased China's production of potassium chloride sixfold, from less than 40,000 t (44,000 short tons) a year at Haixi and Tanggu to just under 240,000 t (260,000 short tons) a year. As of 2010, production was over 1 million metric tons (1.1 million short tons) a year at the main site, with smaller operations around the playa each producing a further 50,000–200,000 t (55,000–220,000 short tons) a year.

During a 2016 inspection tour, Chinese Communist Party general secretary Xi Jinping praised the importance of the factories and their workers to the entire country but emphasized the need for Qarhan's development to be environmentally responsible. As part of a national program to increase the use of electric cars, automobile companies like BYD have since moved to the area, opened factories, and signed contracts with local mining companies to exploit the area's lithium supplies. Infrastructure has been improved, including an overhaul of Golmud Airport.

== Tourism ==
The fertilizer factory is now open to the public for free tours, and its parent company maintains a nearby museum covering the geology of the playa and hosting various salt sculptures. The area was designated a national mining park on 1 August 2008.

== Transportation ==
Sections of the G3011 Liuge Expressway and the Qingzang Railway run over the playa's salt flats.

== See also ==
- List of lakes and salt lakes in China
