= West Dabusun Lake =

- 西达布逊湖 (in Chinese); ᠪᠠᠷᠠᠭᠤᠨ ᠳᠠᠪᠤᠰᠤᠨ ᠨᠠᠭᠤᠷ (in Mongolian)
- Location within Qinghai
- Location: Golmud County; Haixi Prefecture; Qinghai Province; China
- Coordinates: 37°05′00″N 94°47′21″E
- Type: Endorheic ephemeral saline lake
- Primary inflows: Yuejin River (Golmud)
- Basin countries: China
- Surface area: 30 km^{2} (12 sq mi)
- Surface elevation: 2,675 m (8,776 ft)

West Dabusun Lake

Chinese name
- Traditional Chinese: 西達布遜湖
- Simplified Chinese: 西达布逊湖
- Literal meaning: West Dabusun Lake
Transcriptions
Standard Mandarin
- Hanyu Pinyin: Xīdábùxùn Hú; Xī Dábùxùn Hú
- Wade–Giles: Hsi-ta-pu-hsün Hu; Hsi Ta-pu-hsün Hu

Mongolian name
- Mongolian script: ᠪᠠᠷᠠᠭᠤᠨ ᠳᠠᠪᠤᠰᠤᠨ ᠨᠠᠭᠤᠷ
Transcriptions
- SASM/GNC: Baraɣun Dabusun Naɣur

West Dabusun or Dabuxun Lake is an ephemeral lake northwest of Golmud in the Haixi Prefecture of Qinghai Province in northwestern China. Comprising a basin in the Qarhan Playa, it fills when meltwater floods the Golmud River, causing it to spill into subsidiary channels west of the main course to Dabusun Lake. Like the other lakes of the surrounding Qaidam Basin, it is extremely saline.

== Name ==
Dabusun or Dabsan is a romanization of a Mongolian name meaning "Salt Lake". The adjective "west" distinguishes it from nearby Dabusun Lake. Dabuxun is the pinyin romanization of the Mandarin pronunciation of the same name's transcription into characters. Xi Dabsan or Xidabuxun are the same names, prefixed with the Chinese word for "West".

== Geography ==
West Dabusun Lake lies in the Dabusun subbasin in the central Qarhan Playa in the southeastern corner of the Qaidam Basin at an elevation of 2,675 m (8,776 ft). Although sometimes listed as perennial, it is an ephemeral saline lake fed by the "Yuejin River" (t 躍進河, s 跃进河, Yuèjìn Hé), a subsidiary western channel of the Golmud that periodically fill with meltwater. It usually reaches a size of about 30 km^{2} (12 sq mi). In Qaidam's hyperarid climate, there is generally only 28–40 mm (1–2 in) of annual rainfall but about 3,000 mm (120 in) of annual evaporation; the accumulated pool evaporates before the end of the year. It is never more than about 1 m (3 ft 3 in) deep.

The lake's position towards the southern end of the playa means that its waters are relatively less influenced by the concentrated mineral springs along the playa's northern boundary.

== History ==
West Dabusun Lake formed in 1967.

== See also ==
- Qarhan Playa and Qaidam Basin
- List of lakes and saltwater lakes of China
