= Reshui =

Reshui may refer to the following places in China:

- Reshui, Jianping County, Liaoning
- Reshui, Rucheng County, Hunan
- Reshui, Xuanwei, Yunnan
- Reshui Township, Dulan County, Qinghai
