= South Hulsan Lake =

Lake in Qinghai Province, China

- 南霍布逊湖 (Chinese); ᠡᠮᠦᠨ᠎ᠡ ᠬᠤᠯᠤᠰᠤ ᠨᠠᠭᠤᠷ (Mongolian)
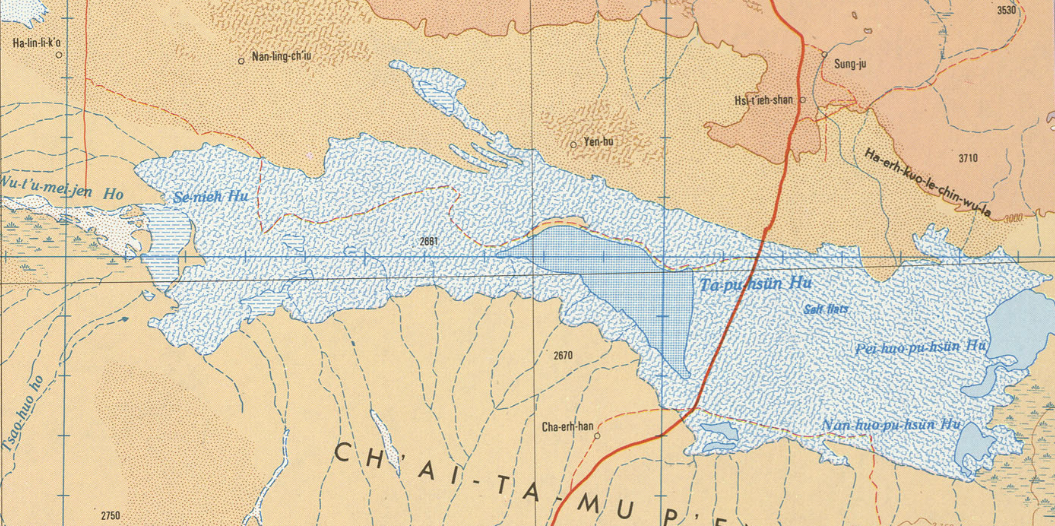
- The Qarhan Playa (1975), with South Hulsan in the southeast corner

- Location within Qinghai
- Location: Dulan County; Haixi Prefecture; Qinghai Province; China
- Coordinates: 36°43′54″N 95°48′23.5″E
- Type: Endorheic saline lake
- Primary inflows: Nuomuhong River; Suolinguole River
- Basin countries: China
- Surface area: 33.41 km^{2} (12.90 sq mi)
- Surface elevation: 2,675.6 m (8,780 ft)

South Hulsan Lake

South Huobuxun
- Traditional Chinese: 南霍布遜湖
- Simplified Chinese: 南霍布逊湖
Transcriptions
Standard Mandarin
- Hanyu Pinyin: Nánhuòbùxùn Hú; Nán Huòbùxùn Hú
- Wade–Giles: Nan-huo-pu-hsün Hu; Nan Huo-pu-hsün Hu

South Huoluxun
- Traditional Chinese: 南霍魯遜湖
- Simplified Chinese: 南霍鲁逊湖
- Literal meaning: South Hulsan Lake
Transcriptions
Standard Mandarin
- Hanyu Pinyin: Nánhuòlǔxùn Hú; Nán Huòlǔxùn Hú
- Wade–Giles: Nan-huo-lu-hsün Hu; Nan Huo-lu-hsün Hu

Mongolian name
- Mongolian script: ᠡᠮᠦᠨ᠎ᠡ ᠬᠤᠯᠤᠰᠤ ᠨᠠᠭᠤᠷ
Transcriptions
- SASM/GNC: Emün-e Qulusu Naɣur

South or Nan Hulsan Lake, also known by other names, is a lake northeast of Golmud in Dulan County, Haixi Prefecture, Qinghai Province, China. A part of the Qarhan Playa, it lies east of Tuanjie Lake and south of North Hulsan Lake. Like the other lakes of the surrounding Qaidam Basin, it is extremely saline.

== Name ==
Hulsan or Hollusun Nor is a romanization of a Mongolian name meaning "Reed Lake", from their former abundance in the area. The adjective "south" distinguishes it from nearby North Hulsan Lake. Huoluxun and Huobuxun (Note: Misspelled as "Huobusun" in Spencer & al., Lowenstein & al., and others and as "Hobuxun" by Garrett.) are the pinyin romanizations of the Mandarin pronunciation of the same name's transcriptions into Chinese characters. Nan Hulsan or Nanhuobuxun is the same name, prefixed with the Chinese word for "South".

== Geography ==
South Hulsan Lake lies in the southern Hulsan subbasin at the eastern edge of the Qarhan Playa in the southeastern corner of the Qaidam Basin at an elevation of 2,675.6 m (8,780 ft). It lies east of Tuanjie Lake and south of North Hulsan Lake. It is fed from the east by the Nuomuhong (t 諾木洪河, s 诺木洪河, Nuòmùhóng Hé) and Sulinggele or Suolinguole River.

It usually has an area of 33.41 km^{2} (13 sq mi), but it varies widely during and between years. It usually increases from the winter and spring floods and decreases during the summer and autumn. In 2014, it was as small as 11.33 km^{2} (4 sq mi) and as wide as 91.94 km^{2} (35 sq mi). In the especially dry year of 2000, it was only 0.51 km^{2} (0.2 sq mi). An inflow from the north by mineral springs in the playa's northern karst zone contribute a smaller volume of water but its much higher solute concentration greatly affects the lake and its sediments. In the area's hyperarid climate, there is generally only 28–40 mm (1–2 in) of annual rainfall but about 3,000 mm (120 in) of annual evaporation. It is never more than about 1 m (3 ft 3 in) deep.

== History ==
South Hulsan Lake has gained somewhat since the year 2000 as North Hulsan has shrunk in size to ephemeral status; this is thought to be related to the many salt pans constructed in recent years to harvest the lakes' sediment for potash.

== Gallery ==
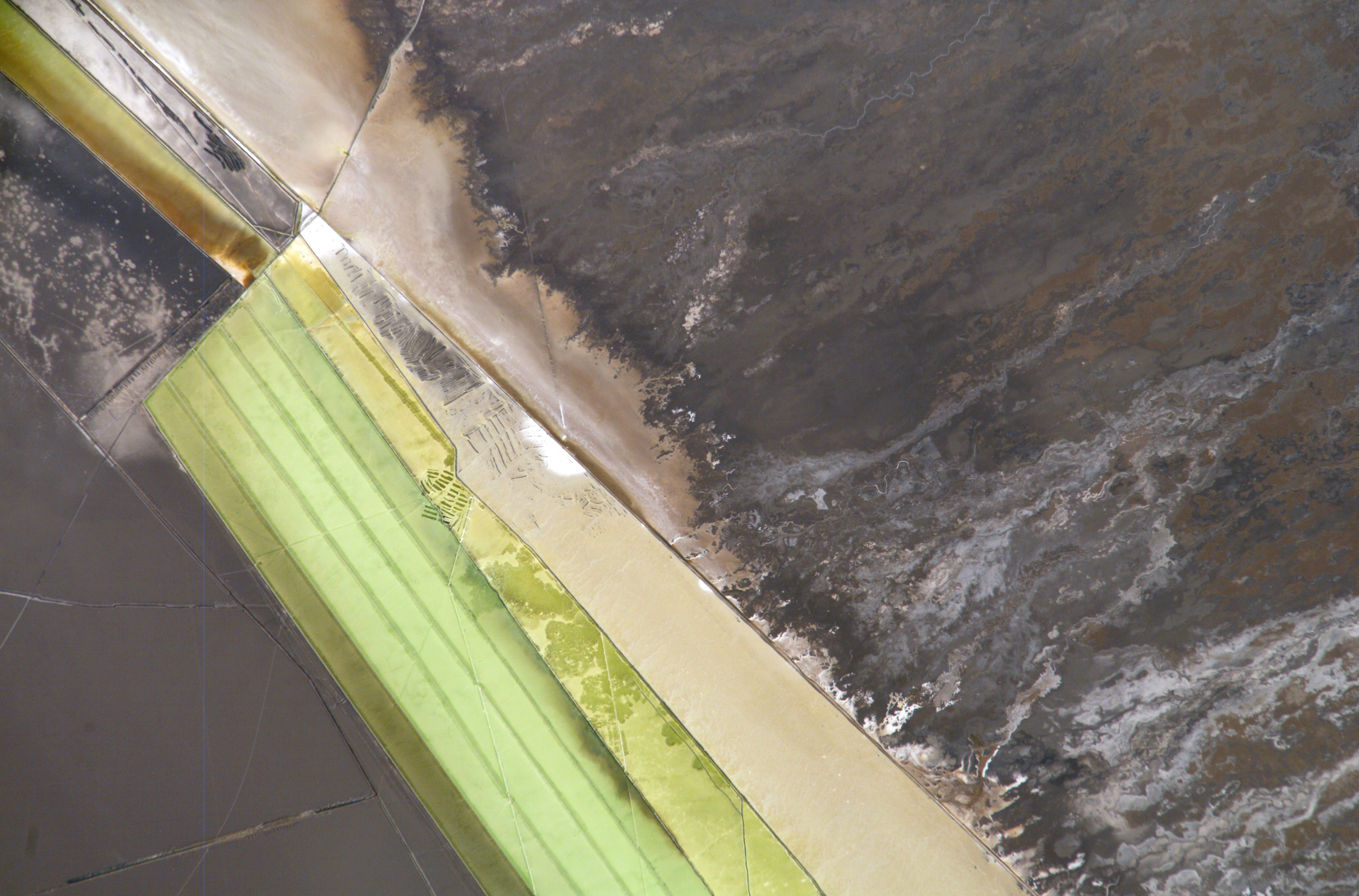
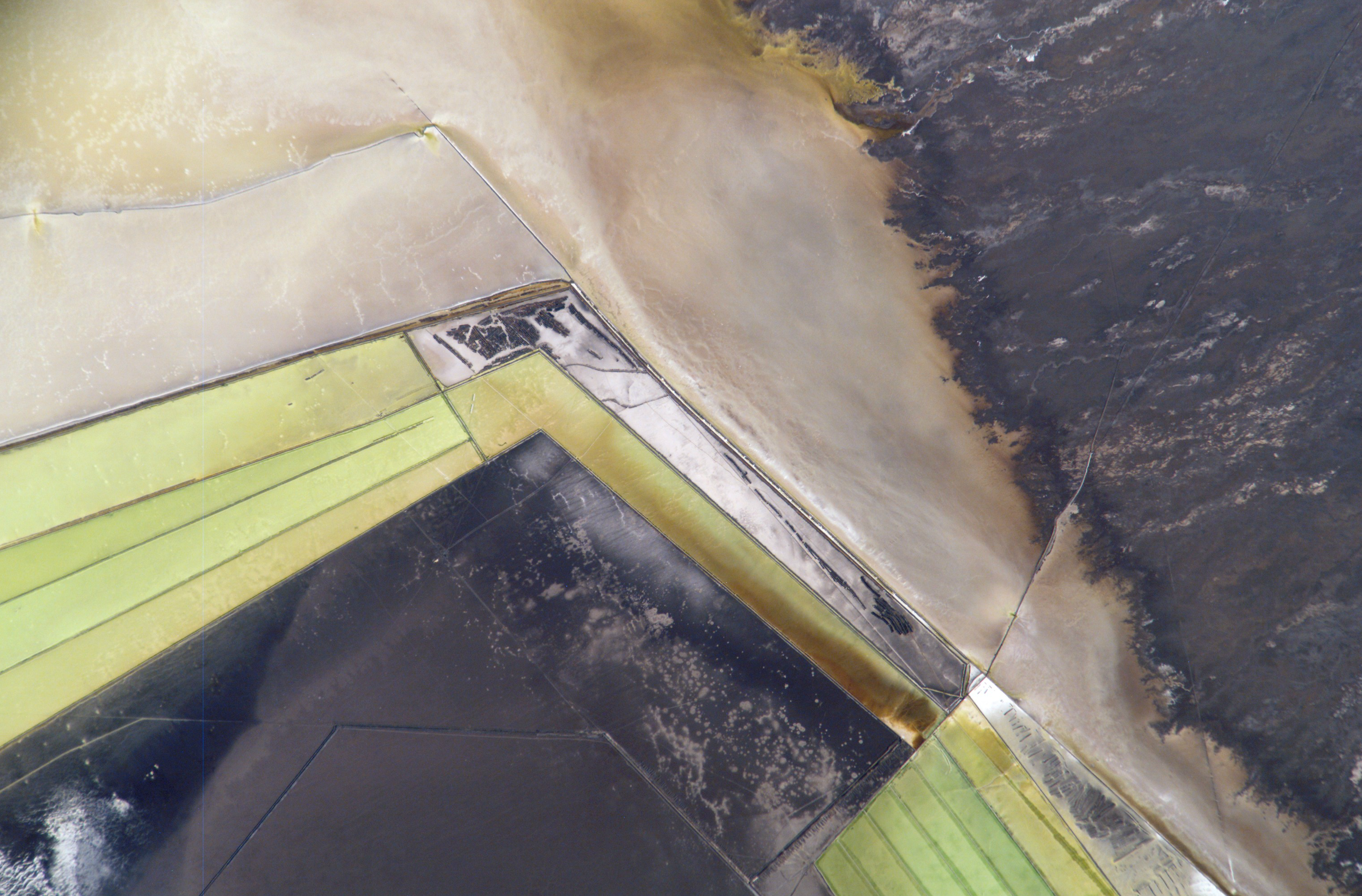
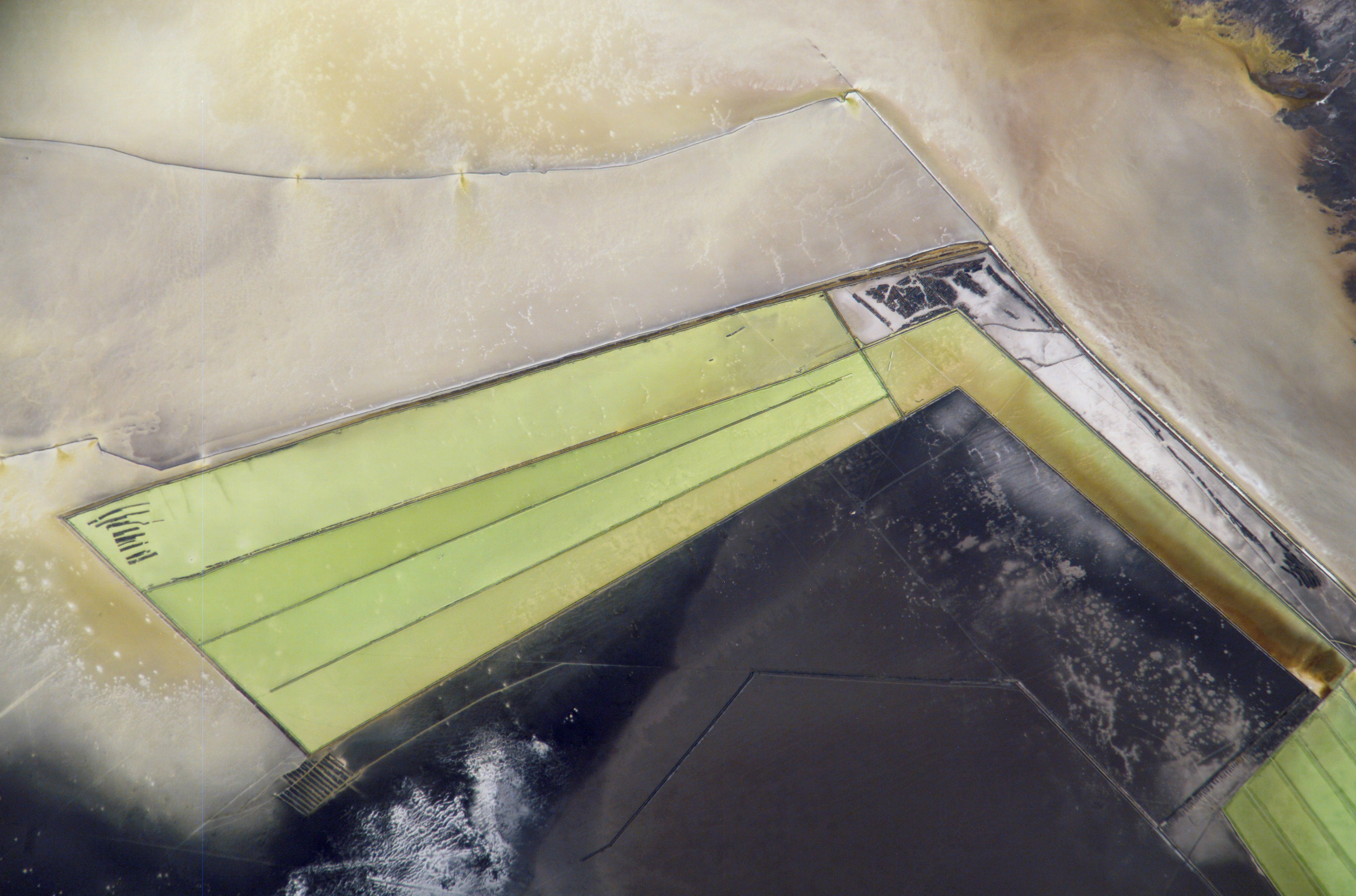
Photographs of the large salt pans beside South Hulsan taken by a member of Expedition 16 from the International Space Station (2007)

== See also ==
- Qarhan Playa and Qaidam Basin
- List of lakes and saltwater lakes of China
