= List of saltwater lakes of China =

There are thousands of lakes in the People's Republic of China, including 945 saltwater lakes and 166 salt lakes.

The Database of Chinese Lakes provides data on China's salt lakes. Changes in water level, environment, and human activities may increase or decrease the size of each lakes over time.

== The five largest salt lakes ==
The location of five largest saltwater lakes (blue) and dried salt lakes (cyan) in the People's Republic of China

=== Five largest saltwater lakes ===
The five largest saltwater lakes in China include:

English Name	Chinese Name	Province	Area (Square Kilometre)
Qinghai Lake	青海湖	Qinghai	4340
Namtso	纳木错	Tibet	1961.5
Siling Lake	色林错	Tibet	1628
Ulungur Lake	乌伦古湖	Xinjiang	753
Yamdrok Lake	羊卓雍错	Tibet	638

=== Dried or divided salt lakes ===
English Name	Chinese Name	Province	Location	Area (Square Kilometer)	Current Condition
Qarhan Playa	察尔汗干盐湖	Qinghai	36°55′N 94°45′E	5856	Divided into smaller salt lakes
Lop Nor	罗布泊	Xinjiang	40°20′N 90°38′E	5500	Dried up
Kunteyi Salt Lake	昆特依干盐湖	Qinghai	38°52′N 93°5′E	1680	Divided into smaller salt lakes
Manas Lake	玛纳斯湖	Xinjiang	45°48′N 85°58′E	577.8	Shrank into a wetland
Dalangtan Salt Lake	大浪滩干盐湖	Qinghai	38°30′N 91°29′E	500	Divided into smaller salt lakes

== Other saltwater lakes ==
English Name	Chinese Name	Province	Area (km²)
Chaka	茶卡盐湖	Qinghai	116
Dabiele	大别勒湖	Qinghai	7.4
Dabusun	达布逊湖	Qinghai	184–334
Ebi	艾比湖	Xinjiang	500
Gahai	尕海	Qinghai	47
North Hulsan	北霍布逊湖	Qinghai	0–90
Rakshastal	拉昂错	Tibet	269
South Hulsan	南霍布逊湖	Qinghai	33
Suli	涩聂湖	Qinghai	69–85
Tuanjie	团结湖	Qinghai	6
West Dabusun	西大布逊湖	Qinghai	0–30
Xiaobiele	小别勒湖	Qinghai	6.3
Xiezuo	协作湖	Qinghai	17
Zabuye	扎布耶茶卡	Tibet	247

== See also ==
- List of lakes of China
