= South Dongting Lake =

Lake in Hunan, China

- The Pearl of the Yangtze River
- 南洞庭湖 (Chinese)
- Location within Hunan Location within China
- Interactive map of South Dongting Lake
- Location: Yueyang, Xiangyin County, Hunan
- Coordinates: 28.822°N 112.679°E
- Type: Lake
- River sources: Haozhu River
- Basin countries: China
- Designation: Protected
- Surface area: 168,000 hectares (1,680 km^{2})
- Average depth: 6.39 metres (21.0 ft)
- Max. depth: 30.8 metres (101 ft)
- Surface elevation: 33 metres (108 ft)

Ramsar Wetland
- Official name: Nan Dongting Wetland and Waterfowl Nature Reserve
- Designated: 11 January 2002
- Reference no.: 1151

South Dongting Lake (Chinese: 南洞庭湖), also known as The Pearl of the Yangtze River, is a large freshwater lake located in the north of the province of Hunan, China, in the Dongting Lake region. The South Dongting Lake occupies approximately one-eighth of the total combined area of all wetlands in the world. The lake is internationally regarded as an important wetland and has been designated as a protected Ramsar site since 2002.

== Geography ==
South Dongting Lake is located in the southwest of Dongting Lake, with an area of 168,000 hectares (1,680 km^{2}). It has the characteristics of wetland with water immersion as lake and water falling as oasis.
