= List of lakes of China =

This is a list of lakes of China.

The five largest saltwater (Red ones are the largest five, orange ones are the dried ones) and fresh water lakes (Blue ones are the traditional five-large-lakes, cyan ones are those that are supposed to be in the largest five) in China

Lakes of China include:

Lake	Provincial level division	Area (km^{2})	Water
Aibi Lake	Xinjiang	36	Saline
Ailik Lake	Xinjiang	50	Saline
Ayding Lake	Xinjiang	176	Dried Salt Bed
Bosten Lake	Xinjiang	1000	Fresh
Chaiwopu Lake	Xinjiang	28	Fresh
Chang Lake	Hubei	131	Fresh
Chao Lake	Anhui	775	Fresh
Dabiele Lake	Qinghai	7.4	Saline
Dabusun Lake	Qinghai	184–334	Saline
Daye Lake	Hubei	54.7	Fresh
Lake Dai	Inner Mongolia	160	
Dian Lake	Yunnan	298	Fresh
Dagze Lake	Tibet	245	Saline
Dianshan Lake	Shanghai		Fresh
Dongqian Lake	Zhejiang	20	Fresh
Donggi Cona	Qinghai	229	Fresh
Dongting Lake	Hunan	2691	Fresh
East Lake	Hubei	33	Fresh
Erhai Lake	Yunnan	256.5	Fresh
Futou Lake	Hubei	161	Fresh
Gaoyou Lake	Anhui and Jiangsu	674.7	Fresh
Heaven Lake (Tianchi)	Jilin and North Korea	4.9	Fresh
Hala Hu	Qinghai	596	Brackish
Lake Heihai	Qinghai		
Hong Lake	Hubei	348	Fresh
Hongze Lake	Jiangsu	2069	Fresh
Houguan Lake	Hubei		Fresh
Lake Huangqi	Inner Mongolia	110	
Hulun Lake	Inner Mongolia	2339	Fresh
Karakol	Xinjiang	4.8	Fresh
Liangzi Lake	Hubei	370.0	Fresh
Longgan Lake	Hubei	316.2	Fresh
Lu Lake	Hubei	40.2	Fresh
Lumajangdong	Tibet		
Lugu Lake	Sichuan and Yunnan	48.5	Fresh
Luoma Lake	Jiangsu		Fresh
Manas Lake	Xinjiang		salt
Namtso	Tibet	1920	Saline
Nansi Lake	Shandong	1266	Fresh
Niushan Lake (part of Liangzi Lake)	Hubei	57.2	Fresh
North Hulsan Lake	Qinghai	0–90.4	Saline
Pangong Tso	Tibet	700	Saline
Poyang Lake	Jiangxi	3206.98	Fresh
Qiandao Lake	Zhejiang	573	Fresh
Qinghai Lake (Koko Nor)	Qinghai	4340	Saline
Siling Lake	Tibet	1865	Saline
South Lake	Hubei	5	Saline
South Dongting Lake	Hunan		Fresh
South Hulsan Lake (Nanhuobuxun)	Qinghai	33.41	Saline
Suli Lake (Senie)	Qinghai	69-85	Saline
Sun Moon Lake	Taiwan	7.93	Fresh
Tai Lake	Jiangsu and Zhejiang	2537.17	Fresh
Tangxun Lake	Hubei	47.6	Fresh
Tuanjie Lake	Qinghai	6	Saline
Ulungur Lake	Xinjiang	827	Saline
West Lake	Zhejiang	5.6	Fresh
West Dabusun Lake (Xidabuxun)	Qinghai	0–30	Saline
Wu Lake	Hubei	21.2	Fresh
Xiaobiele Lake	Qinghai	6.3	Saline
Xiezuo Lake	Qinghai	17	Saline
Xiliang Lake	Hubei	85.2	Fresh
Xingkai Lake	Heilongjiang and Russia (Amur Oblast)	4070	Fresh
Ya'er Lake	Hubei	18.0	Fresh
Yangcheng Lake	Jiangsu	20	Fresh
Yandong Lake	Hubei		Fresh
Yanxi Lake	Hubei	11.8	Fresh
Yezhi Lake	Hubei	2.06	Fresh
Zhangdu Lake	Hubei	280	Fresh

== See also ==
- List of saltwater lakes of China
- Five Lakes (China)
- Lake Tianchi Monster
