= Reshui Township =

- Township
- 热水乡
- Location in Qinghai province
- Coordinates: 36°13′15″N 98°09′47″E
- Country: China
- Province: Qinghai
- Prefecture: Haixi Prefecture
- County: Dulan County

Area
  - Total: 90 km^{2} (35 sq mi)
- Elevation: 3,293 m (10,804 ft)

Population
  - Total: 3,731
  - Density: 41/km^{2} (110/sq mi)
- Time zone: UTC+8 (China Standard)
- Postal code: 632822200

Reshui Township (simplified Chinese: 热水乡; traditional Chinese: 熱水鄉; pinyin: Rèshuǐ Xiāng) is a township in Dulan County, Haixi Mongol and Tibetan Autonomous Prefecture, Qinghai, western China. It is located at the base of the Jingpeng Pass at approximately 3,300 metres (10,800 ft) altitude on the Tibetan Plateau. The name of the township literally means "hot water", which may refer to the hot springs in the area.

There are several raided burial tombs in a necropolis in Reshui.

The Kangxi Emperor of the Qing Dynasty said the water from Reshui was "holy water as precious as golden spring". Kangxi used to take hot water baths in Reshui after battles. Other emperors have also enjoyed the hot waters of Reshui.
