= Dabusun Lake =

Saltwater lake in China

- 达布逊湖 (Chinese); ᠵᠡᠭᠦᠨ ᠳᠠᠪᠤᠰᠤᠨ ᠨᠠᠭᠤᠷ (Mongolian)
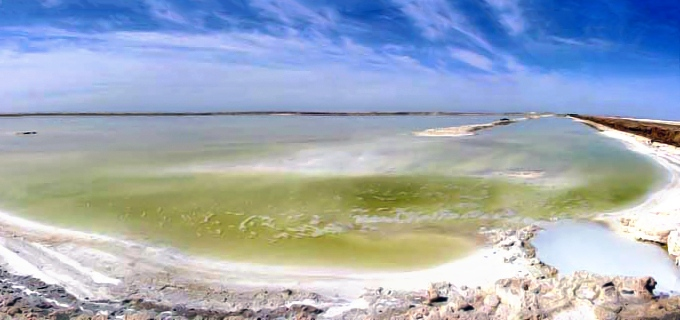
- Dabusun Lake (2006)

- Location within Qinghai
- Location: Golmud City; Haixi Prefecture; Qinghai Province; China
- Coordinates: 37°01′27″N 95°08′20″E
- Type: Endorheic saline lake
- Primary inflows: Golmud River
- Basin countries: China
- Max. length: 30 km (19 mi)
- Max. width: 4–7.5 km (2–5 mi)
- Surface area: 184–334 km^{2} (71–129 sq mi)
- Average depth: 0.5–1.02 m (1 ft 8 in – 3 ft 4 in)
- Max. depth: 1.72 m (5 ft 8 in)
- Surface elevation: 2,675 m (8,776 ft)

Dabusun Lake
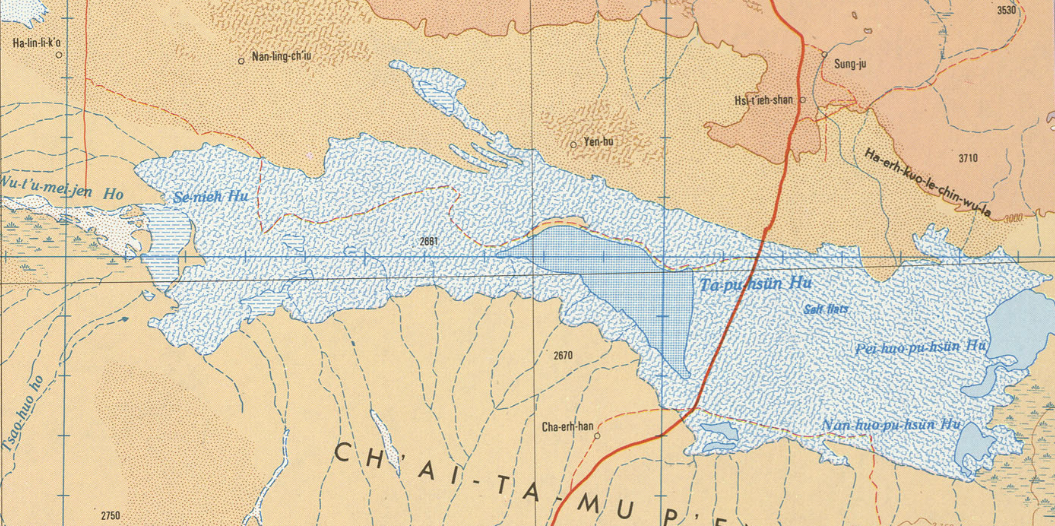
- A map of Dabusun Lake in the central Qarhan Playa (1975)

Chinese name
- Traditional Chinese: 達布遜鹽湖
- Simplified Chinese: 达布逊盐湖
- Postal: Dabasun Nor
- Literal meaning: Dabusun Salt Lake
Transcriptions
Standard Mandarin
- Hanyu Pinyin: Dábùxùn Yánhú
- Wade–Giles: Ta²-pu⁴-hsün⁴ Yen²-hu²

Mongolian name
- Mongolian script: (ᠵᠡᠭᠦᠨ) ᠳᠠᠪᠤᠰᠤᠨ ᠨᠠᠭᠤᠷ
Transcriptions
- SASM/GNC: (J̌egün) Dabusun Naɣur

Former names
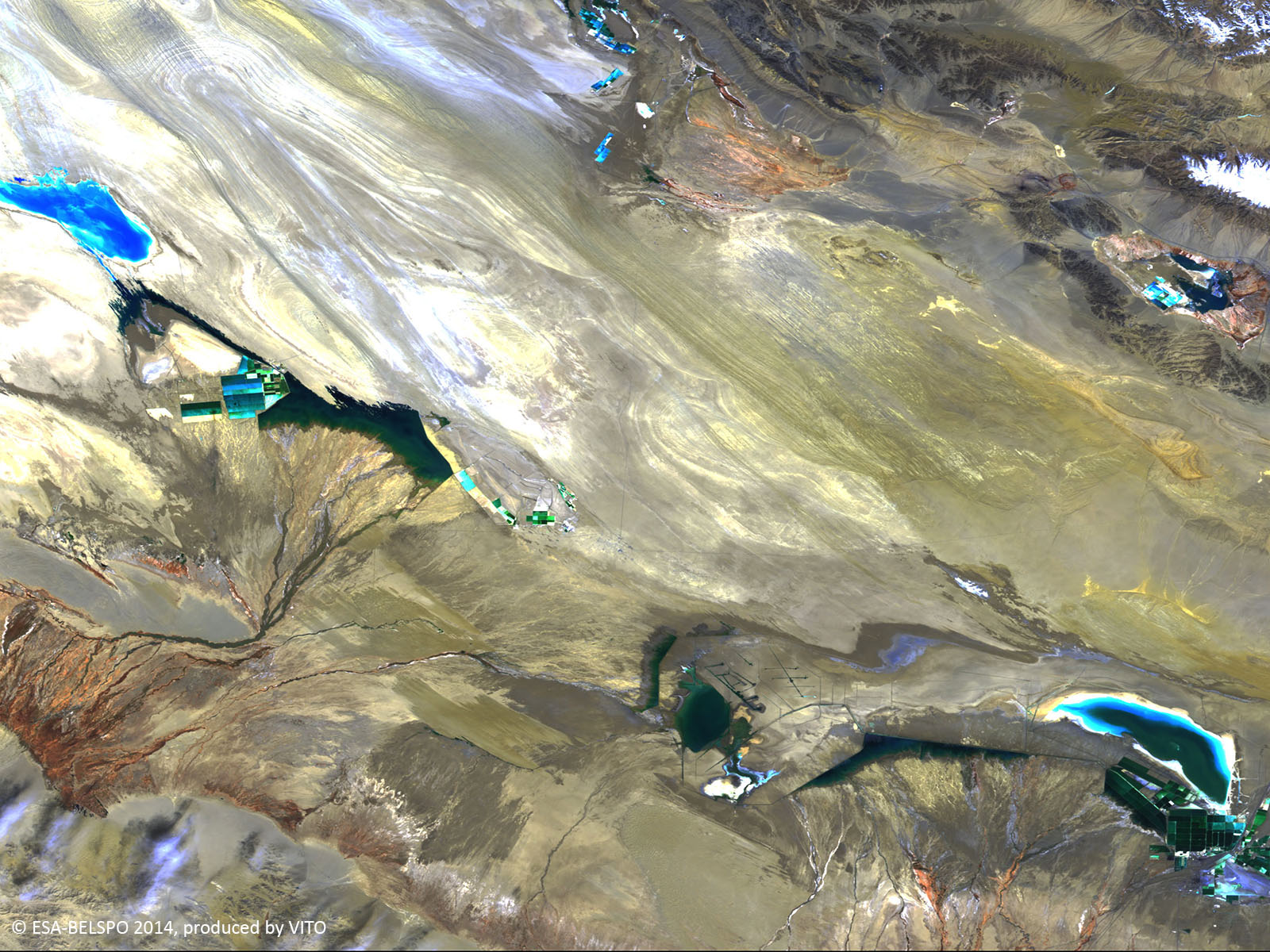
- The Sanhu Depression in 2014, with Dabusun in the southeast (ESA)

Mongolian name
- Mongolian script: ᠳᠠᠯᠠᠢ ᠳᠠᠪᠤᠰᠤᠨ
Transcriptions
- SASM/GNC: Dalai Dabusun

Dabusun or Dabuxun Lake, alternately known as Dabasun Nor, is a lake beside the town Qarhan, just north of Golmud in the Haixi Prefecture of Qinghai Province in northwestern China. Fed by the main course of the Golmud River, it is the largest present-day lake in the Qarhan Playa. Like the other lakes of the surrounding Qaidam Basin, it is extremely saline, with 307–338 grams of salt per liter of water (2.5 lb/gallon).

== Name ==
Dabusun or Dabasun Nor is a romanization of its Mongolian name, which means simply "Salt Lake". In Mongolian, the name is sometimes designated "eastern", to distinguish it from West Dabusun Lake. It is sometimes misspelled Dabsun or Dabsan. It was formerly known as the Dalai Dabasun, meaning "Sea" or "Ocean of Salt".

Dabuxun is the pinyin romanization of the Chinese name 達布遜 (Dábùxùn), a transcription into characters of the Mongolian name.

== Geography ==
Dabusun lies in the Dabusun subbasin in the central Qarhan Playa. It is one of the many saltwater lakes in the endorheic Qaidam Basin, bound by the Qilian Mountains to the north, the Altun to the west, and the Kunlun to the south. Lying at an elevation of 2,675 m (8,776 ft) above sea level, it has a mean annual temperature of 0.1 °C (32.2 °F) despite lying on the same latitude as Greece, Algeria, and Virginia in the United States. Dabasun is the largest present lake in the Qarhan Playa. It is fed by the main course of the Golmud River from the south and, to a lesser extent, by mineral springs from the north. In Qaidam's hyperarid climate, there is generally only 28–40 mm (1–2 in) of annual rainfall but about 3,000 mm (120 in) of annual evaporation. Its area is thus variable by season and year, usually 184–334 km^{2} (71–129 sq mi) but increasing in the wetter winter and spring and decreasing through the summer and fall. The lake is elongated, stretching from the northwest to the southeast. Its length is usually about 30 km (19 mi) east to west, and its width is usually about 4–7.5 km (2–5 mi) north to south. The maximum depth is 1.72 m (5 ft 8 in), and the average depth varies from 0.5 to 1.02 m (1 ft 8 in to 3 ft 4 in).

== Geology ==
Although the northern springs contribute much less volume, their waters carry far greater concentrations of solutes and are important to the chemical composition of the lake. Below, the alternating beds of mud and halite extend at least 40 m (130 ft) in some places. In addition to common salt, it also has an abundance of carnallite (potassium magnesium chloride) in an area of 2 km × 35 km (1 mi × 22 mi) and magnesium sulfate. The known beds are exposed at the surface or buried by 3–4 m (10–13 ft) of sedimentation.

== History ==
Paleoclimatologists believe that between 770,000 and 30,000 years ago Dabusun formed part of a much larger Qarhan Lake, which alternated nine times between being a fresh- and saltwater lake. Pollen studies suggest that the area of the lake bed which now underlies Dabusun was raised around 700 m (2,300 ft) in just the last 500,000 years. Tectonic activity also varied sedimentation in the lake by shifting its tributaries and basins, although it remained in the Qarhan Playa during this period. At around 30,000 years ago, this great freshwater lake spread over at least 25,000 km^{2} (9,700 sq mi) with a surface 50–60 m (160–200 ft) above the present levels of its successors. It was cut off and became saline again around 30,000 years ago and began precipitating salts about 25,000 years ago. It has been shrinking in size by evaporation for most of that time, although it was only about 42 km (26 mi) in circumference in the mid-19th century, when it was visited by the Polono-Russian explorer Przhevalsky. (Note: Note that Przhevalsky's text (but not map) confused the name of this lake with Djaratai Dabas, which lay in Alxa to the northeast.)

Until the recent commercial exploitation of the salts and other minerals, the district has remained largely unpopulated, as the salt deposits made it difficult for the nomads of northwestern China to use the area for their herds. The area's potassium deposits were accidentally discovered in 1957 and exploratory wells found the Yanhu Gas Field north of the lake the next year.

== Transportation ==
The lake lies just west of the G3011 Liuge Expressway. It is also serviced by the Dabusun and Qarhan railway stations on the Qingzang Railway.

== See also ==
- Salt in Chinese history
- List of lakes and saltwater lakes of China
