= Dulan County =

Dulan County ᠳᠤᠯᠠᠭᠠᠨ ᠰᠢᠶᠠᠨ • 都兰县 • ཏུའུ་ལན་རྫོང་ Dulain, Dêrlam
- County
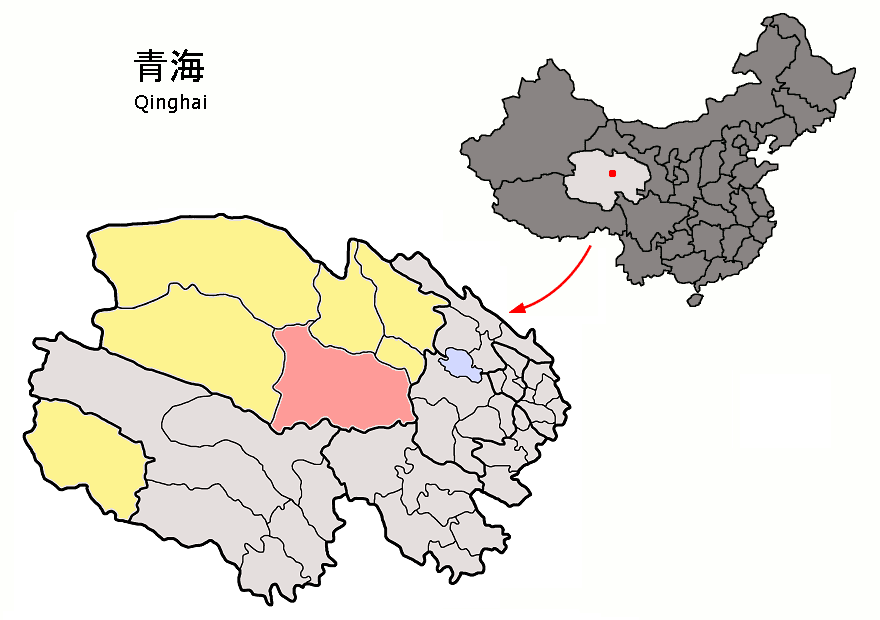
- Dulan County (light red) within Haixi Prefecture (yellow) and Qinghai

- Location of the county seat in Qinghai
- Coordinates: 36°18′N 98°05′E
- Country: China
- Province: Qinghai
- Autonomous prefecture: Haixi
- County seat: Qagan Us

Area
  - Total: 45,270 km^{2} (17,480 sq mi)
- Elevation: 3,194 m (10,479 ft)

Population (2020)
  - Total: 68,273
  - Density: 1.508/km^{2} (3.906/sq mi)
- Time zone: UTC+8 (China Standard)
- Postal code: 816100
- Website: www.dulan.gov.cn

Dulan County

Chinese name
- Simplified Chinese: 都兰县
- Traditional Chinese: 都蘭縣
Transcriptions
Standard Mandarin
- Hanyu Pinyin: Dūlán Xiàn
Yue: Cantonese
- Jyutping: dou^{1}laan^{4} jyun^{2}

Tibetan name
- Tibetan: ཏུའུ་ལན་རྫོང་ or གཏེར་ལམ་རྫོང་།
Transcriptions
- Wylie: tu'u lan rdzong or gter lam rdzong
- Tibetan Pinyin: Dulain Zong or Dêrlam Zong

Mongolian name
- Mongolian script: ᠳᠤᠯᠠᠭᠠᠨ ᠰᠢᠶᠠᠨ
Transcriptions
- SASM/GNC: Dulaγan siyan

Dulan County (Mongolian: ᠳᠤᠯᠠᠭᠠᠨ ᠰᠢᠶᠠᠨ; Tibetan: ཏུའུ་ལན་རྫོང་; Chinese: 都兰县) is a county of east-central Qinghai province, China. It is under the administration of Haixi Mongol and Tibetan Autonomous Prefecture.

== Climate ==
With an elevation of around 3,200 metres (10,000 ft), Dulan County has a cool semi-arid climate (Köppen BSk) that grades into a cool arid climate (BWk) north of the mountains. Winters are long, frigid and extremely dry whilst summers are warm in the south and very warm in the less elevated north. Average low temperatures are below freezing from early/mid October to mid/late April; however, due to the wide diurnal temperature variation, only December and January have an average high below freezing. With monthly percent possible sunshine ranging from 60% in July to 81% in November, the county seat is very sunny, receiving 3,092 hours of bright sunshine annually; relative humidity in all months is below 50% and for seven months is below 40%. The monthly 24-hour average temperature ranges from −9.6 °C (14.7 °F) in January to 15.2 °C (59.4 °F) in July, while the annual mean is 3.7 °C (38.7 °F). Over 70% of the annual precipitation of 229 millimetres or 9.02 inches is delivered from May to August.

Climate data for Dulan County, elevation 3,189 m (10,463 ft), (1991–2020 normals, extremes 1954–present)
Month	Jan	Feb	Mar	Apr	May	Jun	Jul	Aug	Sep	Oct	Nov	Dec	Year
Record high °C (°F)	12.1 (53.8)	15.9 (60.6)	20.0 (68.0)	27.1 (80.8)	28.0 (82.4)	31.9 (89.4)	31.8 (89.2)	32.2 (90.0)	30.3 (86.5)	23.3 (73.9)	17.1 (62.8)	11.5 (52.7)	32.2 (90.0)
Mean daily maximum °C (°F)	−2.0 (28.4)	1.6 (34.9)	6.1 (43.0)	12.0 (53.6)	16.2 (61.2)	19.4 (66.9)	22.0 (71.6)	21.8 (71.2)	17.5 (63.5)	10.6 (51.1)	4.4 (39.9)	−0.6 (30.9)	10.8 (51.4)
Daily mean °C (°F)	−9.4 (15.1)	−5.5 (22.1)	−0.6 (30.9)	5.1 (41.2)	9.5 (49.1)	13.0 (55.4)	15.3 (59.5)	14.8 (58.6)	10.3 (50.5)	3.3 (37.9)	−3.1 (26.4)	−8.1 (17.4)	3.7 (38.7)
Mean daily minimum °C (°F)	−14.7 (5.5)	−11.0 (12.2)	−6.1 (21.0)	−1.1 (30.0)	3.0 (37.4)	6.9 (44.4)	9.4 (48.9)	8.7 (47.7)	4.5 (40.1)	−2.0 (28.4)	−8.0 (17.6)	−13.2 (8.2)	−2.0 (28.5)
Record low °C (°F)	−29.8 (−21.6)	−22.2 (−8.0)	−19.6 (−3.3)	−13.8 (7.2)	−7.6 (18.3)	−4.3 (24.3)	0.1 (32.2)	−0.9 (30.4)	−4.8 (23.4)	−18.2 (−0.8)	−22.6 (−8.7)	−27.0 (−16.6)	−29.8 (−21.6)
Average precipitation mm (inches)	4.2 (0.17)	5.8 (0.23)	7.6 (0.30)	9.1 (0.36)	31.1 (1.22)	51.7 (2.04)	57.5 (2.26)	29.2 (1.15)	19.3 (0.76)	5.9 (0.23)	5.2 (0.20)	2.5 (0.10)	229.1 (9.02)
Average precipitation days (≥ 0.1 mm)	4.3	3.8	4.5	3.9	7.4	10.6	11.4	8.6	6.1	2.8	2.6	3.2	69.2
Average snowy days	5.6	5.4	6.4	4.9	3.8	0.6	0.1	0	0.3	2.9	3.6	4.3	37.9
Average relative humidity (%)	41	36	33	30	37	48	51	47	45	37	37	38	40
Mean monthly sunshine hours	225.1	213.5	247.1	268.5	269.6	246.8	254.9	258.6	242.4	264.7	238.8	227.6	2,957.6
Percentage possible sunshine	72	69	66	68	62	57	58	62	66	77	79	76	68
Source: China Meteorological Administrationextremes

Climate data for Nuomuhong, Dulan, elevation 2,790 m (9,150 ft), (1991–2020 normals)
Month	Jan	Feb	Mar	Apr	May	Jun	Jul	Aug	Sep	Oct	Nov	Dec	Year
Mean daily maximum °C (°F)	−0.5 (31.1)	4.5 (40.1)	9.8 (49.6)	15.9 (60.6)	20.5 (68.9)	24.1 (75.4)	26.5 (79.7)	25.9 (78.6)	21.5 (70.7)	14.3 (57.7)	6.5 (43.7)	0.4 (32.7)	14.1 (57.4)
Daily mean °C (°F)	−8.9 (16.0)	−4.1 (24.6)	1.6 (34.9)	7.8 (46.0)	12.6 (54.7)	16.4 (61.5)	18.5 (65.3)	17.5 (63.5)	12.9 (55.2)	5.3 (41.5)	−2.4 (27.7)	−8.0 (17.6)	5.8 (42.4)
Mean daily minimum °C (°F)	−15.4 (4.3)	−11.1 (12.0)	−5.6 (21.9)	0.3 (32.5)	5.2 (41.4)	9.5 (49.1)	11.8 (53.2)	10.9 (51.6)	6.4 (43.5)	−1.5 (29.3)	−8.9 (16.0)	−14.4 (6.1)	−1.1 (30.1)
Average precipitation mm (inches)	1.1 (0.04)	0.7 (0.03)	0.8 (0.03)	1.4 (0.06)	7.5 (0.30)	14.0 (0.55)	12.8 (0.50)	7.5 (0.30)	4.9 (0.19)	0.6 (0.02)	0.3 (0.01)	0.5 (0.02)	52.1 (2.05)
Average precipitation days (≥ 0.1 mm)	1.9	0.8	1.2	0.9	2.9	5.3	6.3	4.5	3.2	0.7	0.7	0.8	29.2
Average snowy days	2.8	1.9	2.6	1.3	0.7	0	0	0	0	0.6	1.4	1.3	12.6
Average relative humidity (%)	39	30	26	24	29	39	44	41	39	33	34	38	35
Mean monthly sunshine hours	223.8	220.3	264.6	284.0	288.3	262.7	267.3	264.7	244.4	259.3	243.9	227.1	3,050.4
Percentage possible sunshine	72	71	71	72	66	60	61	64	67	76	81	76	70
Source: China Meteorological Administration

== Administrative divisions ==
Dulan County is divided into 4 towns and 4 townships.

Name	Simplified Chinese	Hanyu Pinyin	Tibetan	Wylie	Mongolian (traditional script)	Mongolian (Cyrillic)	Administrative division code
Towns
Qagan Us Town (Chahanwusu, Cahainwusu)	察汉乌苏镇	Cháhànwūsū Zhèn	ཚ་ཧན་བུའུ་སུའུ་གྲོང་རྡལ།	tsha han bu'u su'u grong rdal	ᠴᠠᠭᠠᠨ᠋ᠤᠰᠤᠨ ᠪᠠᠯᠭᠠᠰᠤ	Цагааносон балгас	632822100
Xangdê Town (Xiangride, Dorboljin)	香日德镇	Xiāngrìdé Zhèn	ཤངས་སྡེ་གྲོང་རྡལ།	shangs sde grong rdal	ᠳᠥᠷᠪᠡᠯᠵᠢᠨ ᠪᠠᠯᠭᠠᠰᠤ	Дөрвөлжин балгас	632822101
Xarag Town (Xaruha, Xarrika, Xiariha)	夏日哈镇	Xiàrìhā Zhèn	ཤ་རུ་ཧ་གྲོང་རྡལ།	sha ru ha grong rdal			632822102
Zongja Town (Juun, Zongjia)	宗加镇	Zōngjiā Zhèn	ཙོང་ཇ་གྲོང་རྡལ།	tsong ja grong rdal	ᠵᠡᠭᠦᠨ ᠪᠠᠯᠭᠠᠰᠤ	Зүүн балгас	632822103
Townships
Qukoi Township (Reshui)	热水乡	Rèshuǐ Xiāng	ཆུ་ཁོལ་ཞང་།	chu khol zhang			632822200
Xang Township (Xiangjia)	香加乡	Xiāngjiā Xiāng			ᠱᠠᠩ ᠰᠤᠮᠤ	Шан сум	632822201
Guru Township (Guri, Gugri, Gouli)	沟里乡	Gōulǐ Xiāng	རྒུ་རུ་ཞང་།	rgu ru zhang			632822202
Barun Township (Balung, Balong)	巴隆乡	Bālóng Xiāng	པ་ལུང་ཞང་།	pa lung zhang	ᠪᠠᠷᠠᠭᠤᠨ ᠰᠤᠮᠤ	Баруун сум	632822203

== Transport ==
- China National Highway 109
