= Subbasin =

A subbasin or sub-basin is a structural geologic feature where a larger basin is divided into a series of smaller basins with intervening intrabasinal highs.

The term subbasin has common use in geologic literature, but has yet to be included in the API Glossary of Geology.
