= Xiaobiele Lake =

- 小别勒湖 (Chinese)
- Location within Qinghai
- Location: Golmud County; Haixi Prefecture; Qinghai Province; China
- Coordinates: 37°03′00″N 94°39′19″E
- Type: Endorheic saline lake
- Basin countries: China
- Surface area: 0–6.25 km^{2} (0.00–2.41 sq mi)
- Surface elevation: 2,676.4 m (8,781 ft)

Xiaobiele Lake
- Traditional Chinese: 小別勒湖
- Simplified Chinese: 小别勒湖
Transcriptions
Standard Mandarin
- Hanyu Pinyin: Xiǎobiélè Hú; Xiǎo Biélè Hú
- Wade–Giles: Hsiao-pieh-le Hu; Hsiao Pieh-le Hu

Xiaobieletan
- Traditional Chinese: 小別勒灘
- Simplified Chinese: 小别勒滩
Transcriptions
Standard Mandarin
- Hanyu Pinyin: Xiǎobiélètān; Xiǎobiélè Tān
- Wade–Giles: Hsiao-pieh-le-t‘an; Hsiao Pieh-le T‘an

Xiaobiele Lake or Xiaobieletan is an ephemeral lake in the southwestern Qarhan Playa north of Golmud in the Haixi Prefecture of Qinghai Province in northwestern China. Like the other lakes of the surrounding Qaidam Basin, it is extremely saline; like the other lakes of the surrounding Bieletan subbasin, it is rich in lithium.

== Names ==
The xiao at the beginning of the name is the pinyin romanization of the Chinese word meaning "little" or "lesser", distinguishing it from nearby Dabiele Lake ("Big" or "Greater Biele Lake"). Xiaobiele is also known as Xiaobieletan from a Chinese word used for both beaches and muddy riverbanks.

== Geography ==
Xiaobiele Lake is an ephemeral salt lake in the Bieletan subbasin in the southwestern quarter of the Qarhan Playa at an elevation of 2,676.4 m (8,781 ft). It lies between Dabiele and West Dabusun Lakes. It is usually 6.25 km^{2} (2.41 sq mi) wide. Its depth usually does not exceed 1 m (3 ft 3 in).

== Geology ==
Xiaobiele's position at the south end of the playa means that its waters are relatively less influenced by the concentrated mineral springs along the playa's northern boundary. As with Dabiele, it is nonetheless nearly saturated with calcite, anhydrite, halite, and (importantly) carnallite, which is processed to produce potash for potassium-rich fertilizers and other uses. The Bieletan subbasin as a whole—inclusive of Suli, S. Suli, and Dabiele—is also the richest source of brine lithium in China, with an estimated store of 7.74 million metric tons (8.53 million short tons) of lithium chloride. The lithium derives from hot springs located near Mount Buka Daban which now feed the Narin Gol River or Hongshui River (t 紅水河, s 红水河, Hóngshuǐ Hé) that flows into East Taijinar Lake. In the past, however, the springs lay within the "Kunlun" paleolake which until about 30,000 years ago produced a river which flowed north into a broad alluvial fan feeding the "Qarhan" paleolake in the Sanhu area. Bieletan's lithium came both from deposits directly flowing into the area at the time and continuing contributions from the Urt Moron and other rivers arising in and flowing through the former alluvial plain.

== See also ==
- Qarhan Playa & Qaidam Basin
- List of lakes and saltwater lakes of China
