= Da Qaidam =

Da Qaidam 大柴旦 · ᠶᠡᠬᠡ ᠴᠠᠢᠢᠳᠠᠮ · ཚྭ་འདམ་ཆེ་བའི་
- Administrative Zone
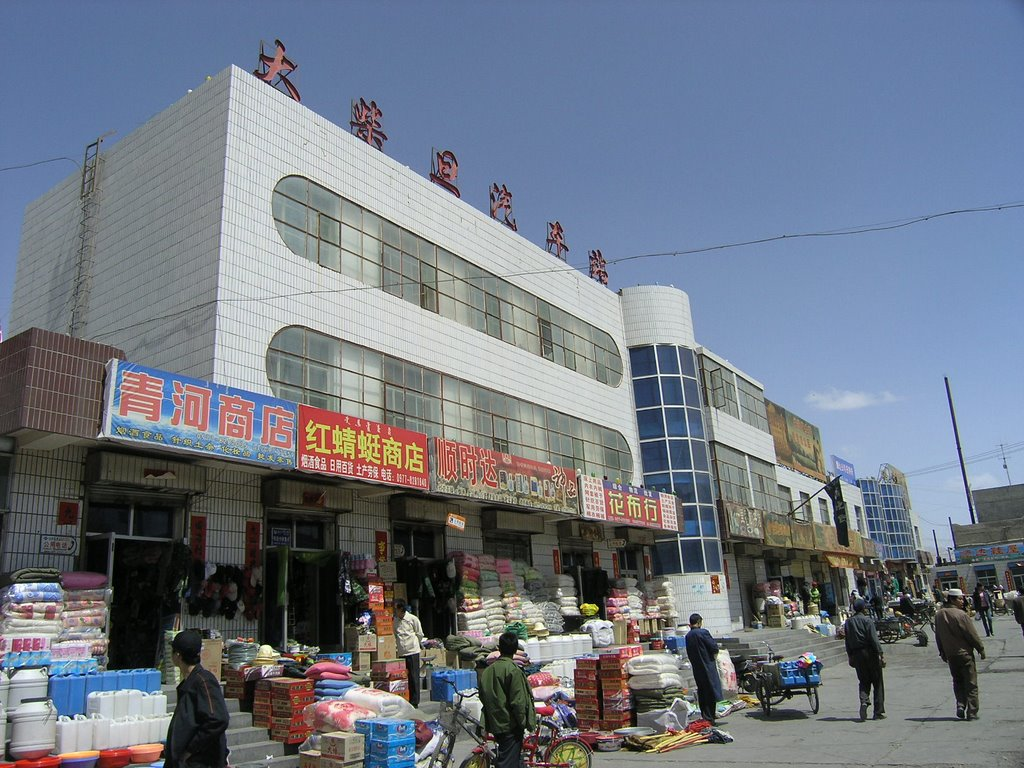
- Da Qaidam coach terminal

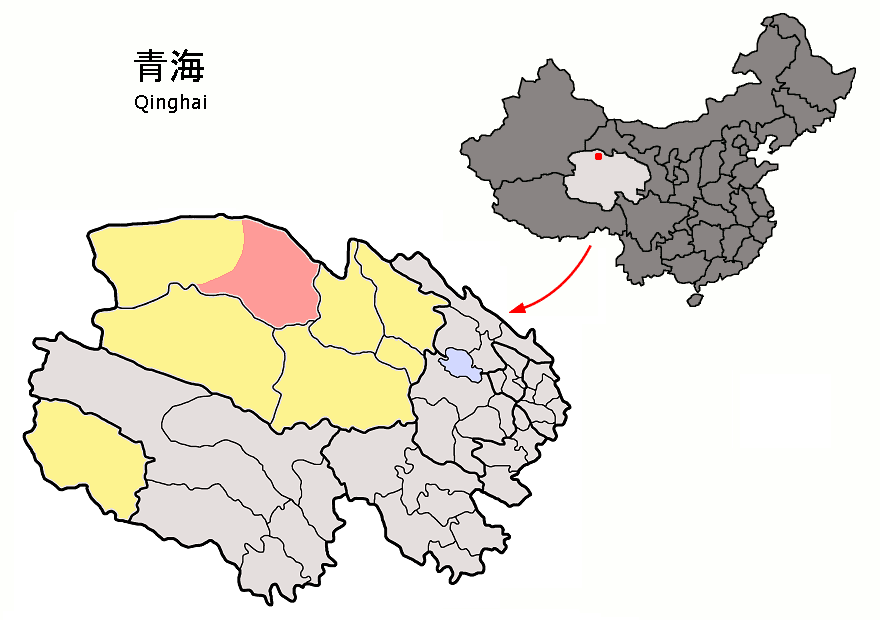
- Location of Da Qaidam (red) in Haixi Prefecture (yellow) and Qinghai

- Location of the seat in Qinghai
- Coordinates (Qaidam Town government): 37°50′57″N 95°21′41″E
- Country: China
- Province: Qinghai
- Autonomous prefecture: Haixi
- Township-level divisions: 2 towns
- Seat: Qaidam Town

Area
  - Total: 21,000 km^{2} (8,100 sq mi)
- Elevation: 3,174 m (10,413 ft)

Population (2020)
  - Total: 16,287
  - Density: 0.78/km^{2} (2.0/sq mi)
- Time zone: UTC+8 (China Standard)
- Website: www.dachaidan.gov.cn

Da Qaidam

Chinese name
- Chinese: 大柴旦行政委员会
- Literal meaning: Big Qaidam; Greater Qaidam
Transcriptions
Standard Mandarin
- Hanyu Pinyin: Dà Cháidàn
- Wade–Giles: Ta Ch‘ai-tan

Tibetan name
- Tibetan: ཚྭ་འདམ་ཆེ་བའི་

Mongolian name
- Mongolian script: ᠶᠡᠬᠡ ᠴᠠᠢᠢᠳᠠᠮ ᠦ᠋ᠨ ᠵᠠᠰᠠᠭ ᠵᠠᠬᠢᠷᠭᠠᠨ ᠤ ᠵᠥᠪᠯᠡᠯ

Da Qaidam is a county-level administrative zone in Haixi Prefecture in northwestern Qinghai province, China. It borders Gansu province to the north.

== Etymology ==
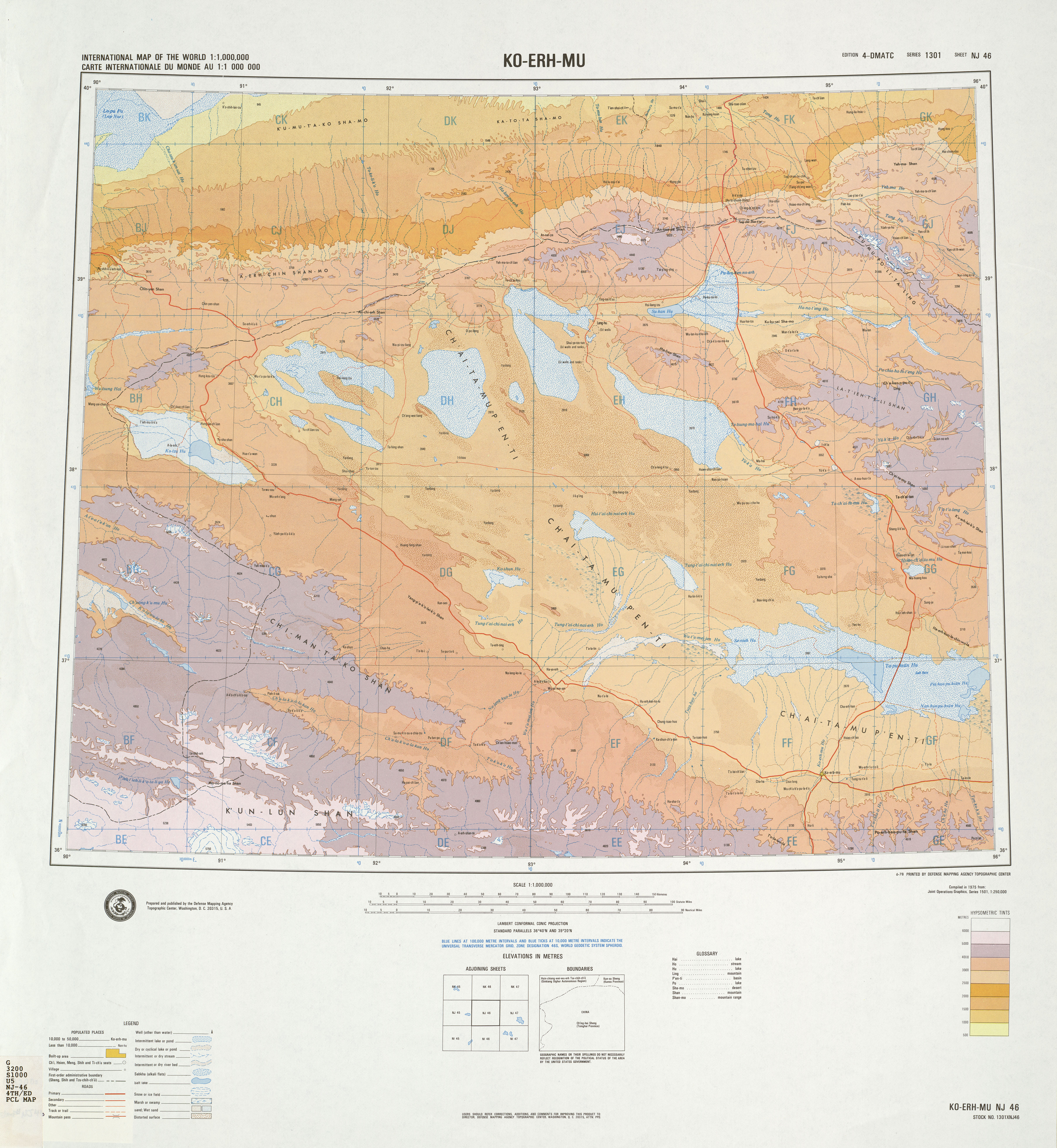
Map including Da Qaidam (labeled as Ta-ch'ai-tan) and surrounding region from the International Map of the World (1975)

Da Qaidam is a combination of the Hanyu Pinyin romanization of the Mandarin pronunciation of 大 (dà), the Chinese word meaning "big" or "greater", and the Zangwen Pinyin romanization of the Tibetan name ཚྭ་འདམ (qaidam), meaning "salt marsh" and referencing the surrounding Qaidam Basin. The Mandarin pinyin romanization of the Chinese transcription of Qaidam is "Cháidàn".

== Administrative divisions ==
The area administered as Da Qaidam is divided into two towns. The seat of Da Qaidam's administration is Qaidam Town, which lies at an altitude of 3,174 m (10,413 ft) above sea level.

Name	Simplified Chinese	Hanyu Pinyin	Tibetan	Wylie	Mongolian (traditional script)	Mongolian (Cyrillic)	Administrative division code
Town
Qaidam Town (Chaidan Town)	柴旦镇	Cháidàn Zhèn	ཚྭ་འདམ་གྲོང་བརྡལ།	tshwa 'dam grong brdal	ᠴᠠᠢᠳᠠᠮ ᠪᠠᠯᠭᠠᠰᠤ	Цайдам балгас	632857100
Xitieshan Town	锡铁山镇	Xītiěshān Zhèn	ཞི་ཐོའི་རི་གྲོང་རྡལ།	zhi tho'i ri grong rdal	ᠬᠣᠷᠭᠣᠯᠵᠢᠨ ᠠᠭᠤᠯᠠ ᠪᠠᠯᠭᠠᠰᠤ	Хорголжин уул балгас	632857101

== Geography and climate ==
Da Qaidam borders Delingha to the east, Lenghu to the west, Golmud across the Qarhan Playa to the south, and Jiuquan (Gansu) to the north, and is part of the northern Qaidam Basin.

Similar to neighbouring Golmud, Da Qaidam has a cool arid climate (Köppen BWk), with long, cold winters, and warm summers, although due to its location further north and elevation more than 350 metres (1,150 ft) higher, Da Qaidam is substantially cooler. The monthly 24-hour average temperature drops to −12.2 °C (10.0 °F) in January and rises to 16.6 °C (61.9 °F) in July, while the annual mean is 2.9 °C (37.2 °F). Precipitation is very low, totaling only 98 millimetres or 3.86 inches per annum, falling on 35 days, most of which are during the summer. With monthly percent possible sunshine ranging from 65% in July to 82% in October, the area receives 3,257 hours of bright sunshine annually.

Climate data for Da Qaidam, elevation 3,173 m (10,410 ft), (1991–2020 normals)
Month	Jan	Feb	Mar	Apr	May	Jun	Jul	Aug	Sep	Oct	Nov	Dec	Year
Mean daily maximum °C (°F)	−3.2 (26.2)	0.8 (33.4)	5.6 (42.1)	11.7 (53.1)	16.2 (61.2)	20.2 (68.4)	22.9 (73.2)	22.4 (72.3)	17.5 (63.5)	10.3 (50.5)	3.5 (38.3)	−1.8 (28.8)	10.5 (50.9)
Daily mean °C (°F)	−12.2 (10.0)	−7.6 (18.3)	−2.2 (28.0)	4.1 (39.4)	9.5 (49.1)	13.9 (57.0)	16.6 (61.9)	15.7 (60.3)	10.4 (50.7)	2.3 (36.1)	−5.0 (23.0)	−10.7 (12.7)	2.9 (37.2)
Mean daily minimum °C (°F)	−19.8 (−3.6)	−15.3 (4.5)	−9.7 (14.5)	−3.6 (25.5)	2.0 (35.6)	7.3 (45.1)	10.3 (50.5)	9.2 (48.6)	3.7 (38.7)	−5.0 (23.0)	−12.1 (10.2)	−17.8 (0.0)	−4.2 (24.4)
Average precipitation mm (inches)	2.6 (0.10)	1.8 (0.07)	3.5 (0.14)	2.5 (0.10)	10.3 (0.41)	23.8 (0.94)	27.5 (1.08)	14.2 (0.56)	8.1 (0.32)	1.8 (0.07)	1.4 (0.06)	1.3 (0.05)	98.8 (3.9)
Average snowy days	3.5	2.6	2.8	2.1	2.0	0.2	0.2	0.1	0.2	1.5	1.8	2.7	19.7
Average relative humidity (%)	43	34	29	27	31	38	41	38	36	32	36	41	36
Mean monthly sunshine hours	231.8	227.1	271.3	293.1	309.7	285.2	283.0	283.7	265.5	280.1	242.0	228.5	3,201
Percentage possible sunshine	75	74	72	74	70	65	64	68	72	82	81	77	73
Source: China Meteorological Administration

== Economy ==
As elsewhere in the Qaidam Basin, mining industries are of major importance in Da Qaidam. There is a lead mine in Xitieshan, the Xitieshan Lead Mine (锡铁山铅矿), as well as a number of salt lakes where potash and related products are extracted.

== Transportation ==
China National Highway 215 and China National Highway 315 pass through Da Qaidam and meet here. Dachaidan East and Xitieshan railway stations on the Qinghai–Tibet Railway are both located within Da Qaidam.
