= Dabiele Lake =

- 大别勒湖 (Chinese)
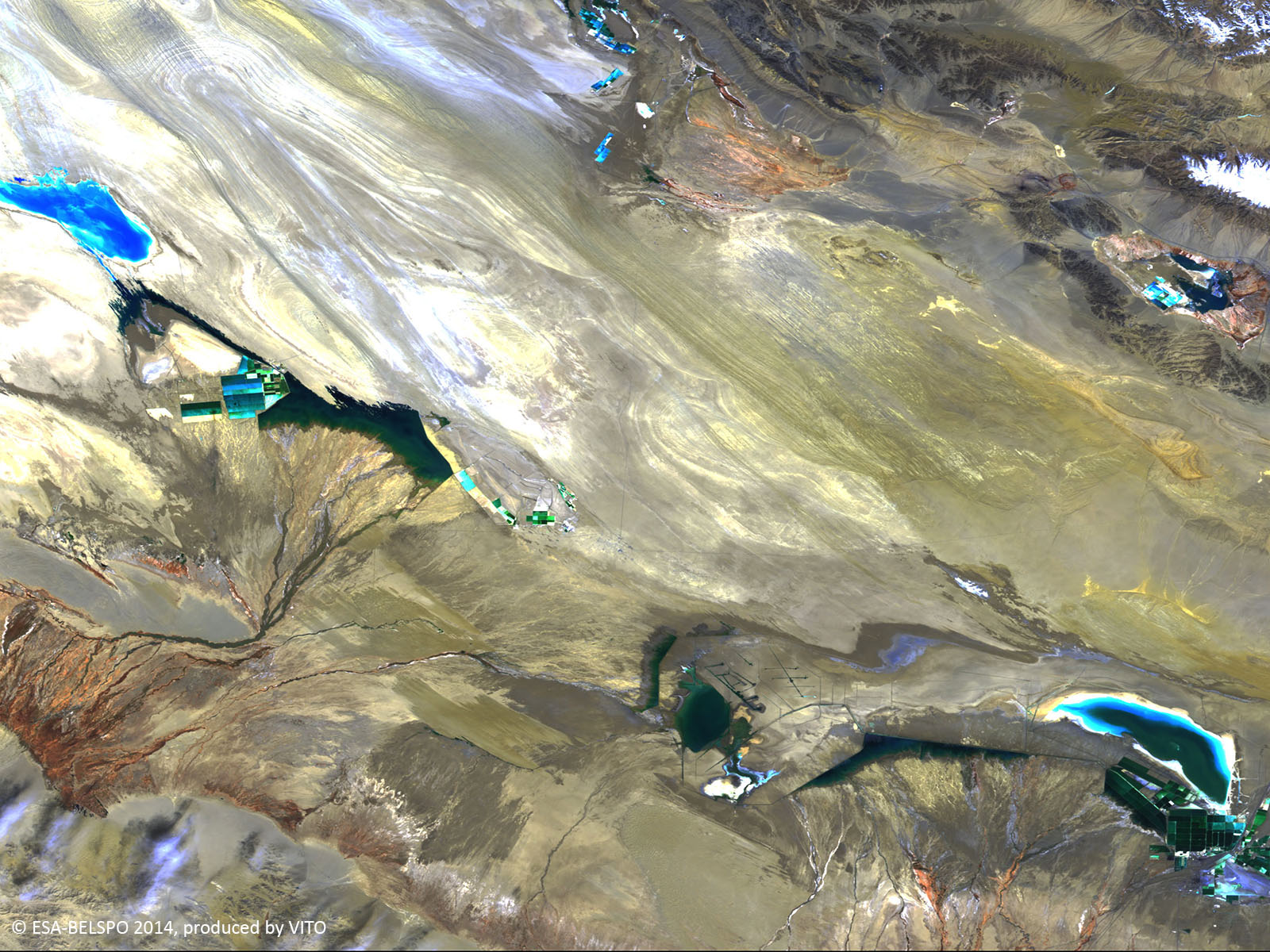
- The Sanhu Depression in 2014 with Dabiele in the south, between Suli and Dabusun Lakes (ESA)

- Location within Qinghai
- Location: Golmud County; Haixi Prefecture; Qinghai Province; China
- Coordinates: 36°54′20″N 94°23′28″E
- Type: Endorheic saline lake
- Primary inflows: Tuolahai River; Qingshui River
- Basin countries: China
- Surface area: 0–7.38 km^{2} (0.00–2.85 sq mi)
- Surface elevation: 2,676.6 m (8,781 ft)

Dabiele Lake
- Traditional Chinese: 大別勒湖
- Simplified Chinese: 大别勒湖
Transcriptions
Standard Mandarin
- Hanyu Pinyin: Dàbiélè Hú; Dà Biélè Hú
- Wade–Giles: Ta-pieh-le Hu; Ta Pieh-le Hu

Bieletan
- Traditional Chinese: 別勒灘
- Simplified Chinese: 别勒滩
Transcriptions
Standard Mandarin
- Hanyu Pinyin: Biélètān; Biélè Tān
- Wade–Giles: Pieh-le-t‘an; Pieh-le T‘an

Dabieletan
- Traditional Chinese: 大別勒灘
- Simplified Chinese: 大别勒滩
Transcriptions
Standard Mandarin
- Hanyu Pinyin: Dàbiélètān; Dà Biélètān
- Wade–Giles: Ta-pieh-le-t‘an; Ta Pieh-le T‘an

Dabiele Lake, also known by other names, is an ephemeral lake in the southwestern Qarhan Playa north of Golmud in the Haixi Prefecture of Qinghai Province in northwestern China. It is fed by the Tuolahai and Qingshui Rivers from the Kunlun Mountains to the south. Like the other lakes of the surrounding Qaidam Basin, it is extremely saline; like the other lakes in the Bieletan subbasin, it is rich in lithium.

== Names ==
The da at the beginning of the name is the pinyin romanization of the Chinese word for "big" or "greater", distinguishing it from nearby Xiaobiele Lake ("Little" or "Lesser Biele Lake"). Dabiele is also known as Bieletan or Dabieletan, from a Chinese word used for both beaches and muddy riverbanks.

== Geography ==
Dabiele Lake is an ephemeral salt lake in the Bieletan subbasin on the southwestern edge of the Qarhan Playa at an elevation of 2,676.6 m (8,781 ft). It lies between Suli and Xiaobiele Lakes. It is usually about 7.38 km^{2} (2.85 sq mi) wide. It is fed from the south by the Tuolahai (托拉亥河, Tuōlāhài Hé) and Qingshui Rivers (清水河, Qīngshuǐ Hé). Its depth usually does not exceed 1 m (3 ft 3 in).

== Geology ==
Dabiele's position at the south end of the playa means that its waters are relatively less influenced by the concentrated mineral springs along the playa's northern boundary. As with Xiaobiele, it is nonetheless nearly saturated with calcite, anhydrite, halite, and (importantly) carnallite, which is processed to produce potash for potassium-rich fertilizers and other uses.

The Bieletan subbasin as a whole—inclusive of Suli, S. Suli, and Xiaobiele—is also the richest source of brine lithium in China, with an estimated store of 7.74 million metric tons (8.53 million short tons) of lithium chloride. The lithium derives from hot springs located near Mount Buka Daban which now feed the Narin Gol River or Hongshui River (t 紅水河, s 红水河, Hóngshuǐ Hé) that flows into East Taijinar Lake. In the past, however, the springs lay within the "Kunlun" paleolake which until about 30,000 years ago produced a river which flowed north into a broad alluvial fan feeding the "Qarhan" paleolake in the Sanhu area. Bieletan's lithium came both from deposits directly flowing into the area at the time and continuing contributions from the Urt Moron and other rivers arising in and flowing through the former alluvial plain.

== See also ==
- Qarhan Playa & Qaidam Basin
- List of lakes and saltwater lakes of China
