= Suli Lake =

Lake in Qinghai Province, China

- 涩聂湖 (Chinese)
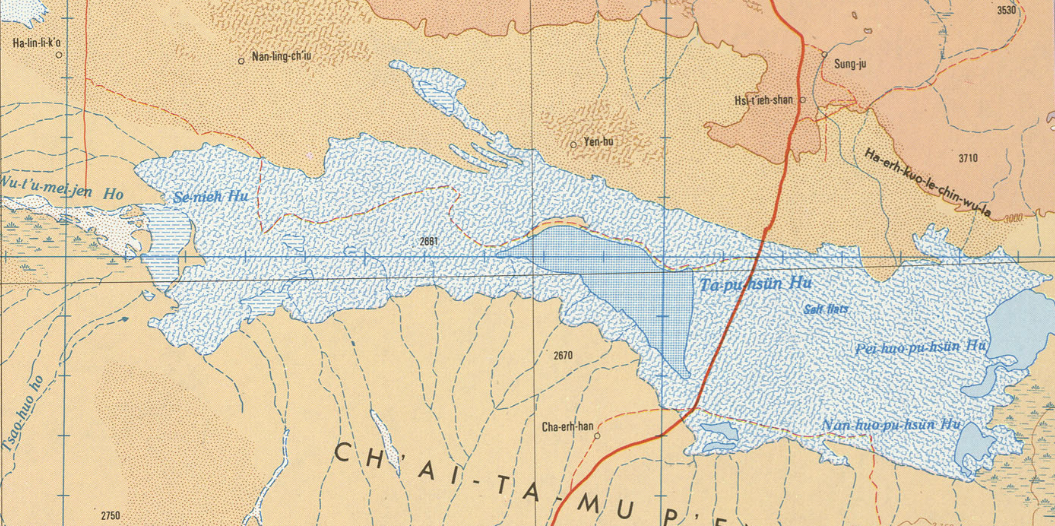
- A map of the Qarhan Playa (1975), with Suli Lake (Se-nieh Hu) in the far west

- Location within Qinghai
- Location: Golmud County; Haixi Prefecture; Qinghai Province; China
- Coordinates: 37°02′06″N 94°18′54.5″E
- Type: Endorheic saline lake
- Primary inflows: Urt Moron River
- Basin countries: China
- Surface area: 69–85 km^{2} (27–33 sq mi)
- Surface elevation: 2,675.6 m (8,778 ft)

Suli Lake
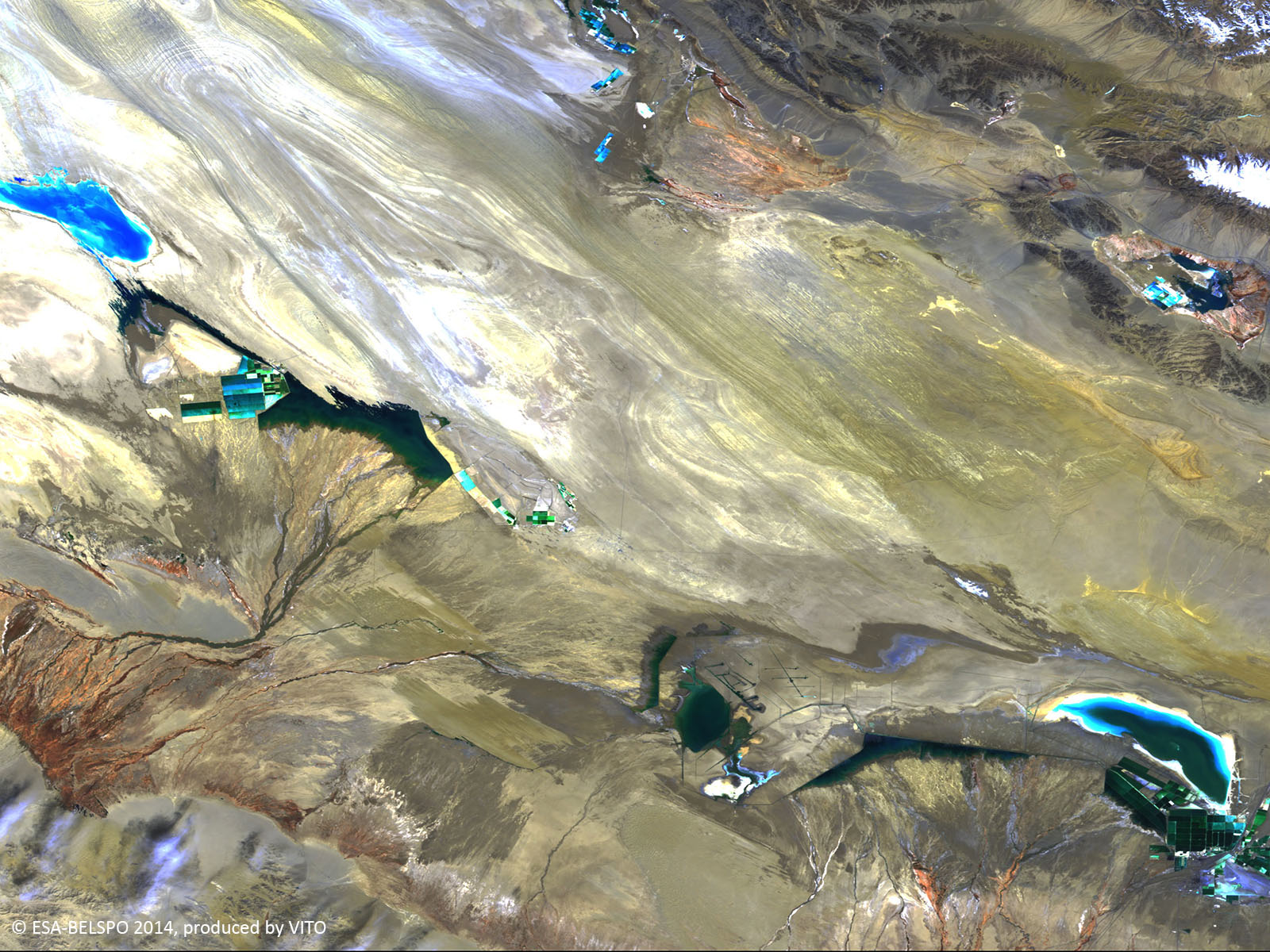
- The Sanhu Depression in 2014, with Suli in central south (ESA)
- Traditional Chinese: 澀聶湖
- Simplified Chinese: 涩聂湖
Transcriptions
Standard Mandarin
- Hanyu Pinyin: Sèniè Hú
- Wade–Giles: Se-nieh Hu

Suli or Senie Lake is a lake in the western Qarhan Playa north of Golmud in the Haixi Prefecture of Qinghai Province in northwestern China. It is fed from the west by the Urt Moron River. Like the other lakes of the surrounding Qaidam Basin, it is extremely saline; like the other lakes of the surrounding Bieletan subbasin, it is rich in lithium. Its underlying salt has also trapped one of China's largest onshore natural gas fields.

== Name ==
Suli and Sheli are romanizations of the lake's Mongolian name, which derives from a word for "temples" or "sideburns". (Compare Manchu ᡧᡠᠯᡠ, šulu.) Senie (Note: Misspelled Seni by Du & al. and others.) is the pinyin romanization of the Mandarin pronunciation of the name's transcription into Chinese characters.

== Geography ==
Suli Lake lies in the Bieletan subbasin at the western edge of the Qarhan Playa at an elevation of 2,675.6 m (8,778 ft). It is located north of South Suli Lake and northwest of Dabiele Lake. Its area varies from 69–85 km^{2} (27–33 sq mi). It is fed from the west by the Urt Moron or Utumeiren (t 烏圖美仁河, s 乌图美仁河, Wūtúměirén Hé). Its depth usually does not exceed 1 m (3 ft 3 in).

== Geology ==
Suli's position at the western end of the playa means that its waters are relatively less influenced by the concentrated mineral springs along the playa's northern boundary. Its waters are also less saturated with potassium-rich carnallite than other southern lakes, such as Tuanjie. However, the Bieletan subbasin as a whole—inclusive of S. Suli, Dabiele, and Xiaobiele—is the richest source of brine lithium in China, with an estimated store of 7.74 million metric tons (8.53 million short tons) of lithium chloride. The lithium derives from hot springs located near Mount Buka Daban which now feed the Narin Gol River or Hongshui River (t 紅水河, s 红水河, Hóngshuǐ Hé) that flows into East Taijinar Lake. In the past, however, the springs lay within the "Kunlun" paleolake which until about 30,000 years ago produced a river which flowed north into a broad alluvial fan feeding the "Qarhan" paleolake in the Sanhu area. Bieletan's lithium came both from deposits directly flowing into the area at the time and continuing contributions from the Urt Moron and other rivers arising in and flowing through the former alluvial plain.

North of Suli Lake, the Sebei-1 and Sebei-2 gas fields form China's 4th-largest onshore reserve of natural gas, with production capacity of 4.95 billion cubic meters (175 billion cubic feet) per year. A pipeline connects it directly to Xining and Lanzhou.

== History ==
During the Neogene, tectonic shifts made the bed of Suli Lake the lowest point of the Qaidam Basin, 3,200 m (10,500 ft) below its ridge.

The nearby gas fields were first exploited in 1974.

== See also ==
- Qarhan Playa & Qaidam Basin
- List of lakes and saltwater lakes of China
