= Qarhan railway station =

Railway station in Golmud, China

Coordinates: 36°47′58″N 95°17′55″E

- Traditional Chinese: 察爾汗站
- Simplified Chinese: 察尔汗站
- Literal meaning: Qarhan Station
Transcriptions
Standard Mandarin
- Hanyu Pinyin: Chá'ěrhán Zhàn
- Wade–Giles: Ch‘a-erh-han Ch‘an

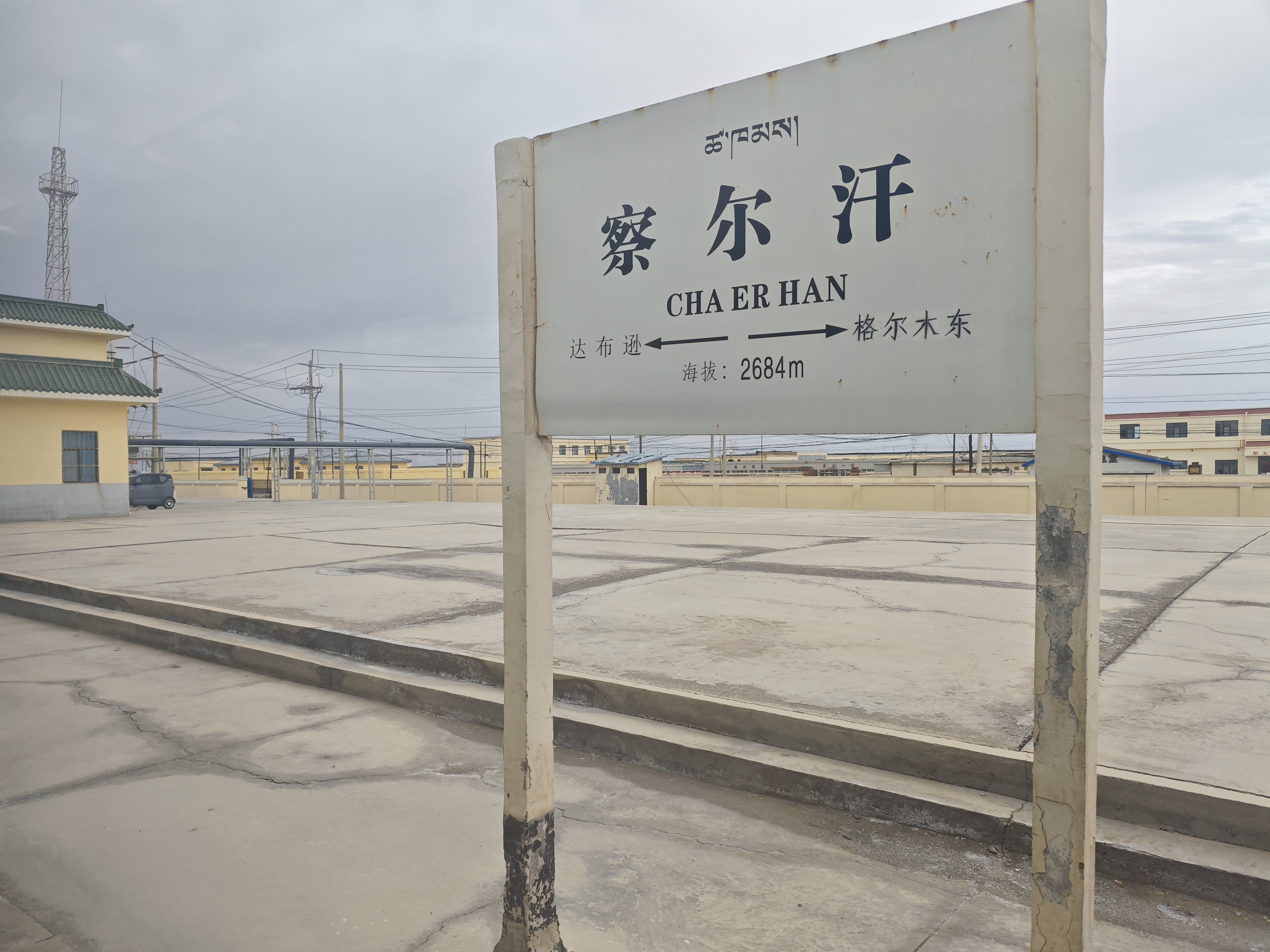
Qinghai-Tibet Railway Qarhan Station

The Qarhan or Cha'erhan railway station is a station on the Qingzang Railway at Qarhan in Golmud County, Haixi Prefecture, Qinghai Province, China.

Qarhan station is located in Qarhan Playa of the Qaidam Basin, near Dabusun Lake where major salt works are located. As of 2012, a 25 km (16 mi) private railway branch from this station to the nearby facilities of the Zangge Potash Co Ltd. is under construction.

Most passenger trains pass through Qarhan without stopping. As of 2017, just one train a day in each direction (local service Xining–Golmud) stops there.

== See also ==
- Qingzang Railway
- List of stations on Qingzang railway

Preceding station	China Railway	Following station
Dabusun towards Xining	Qinghai–Tibet railway	Yushuihe towards Lhasa
