= Mangnai =

Mangnai 茫崖市 · ᠮᠠᠩᠨᠠᠢ ᠶᠢᠨ ᠬᠣᠲᠠ · མང་ནེ་གྲོང་ཁྱེར། Mang'ai
- County-level city
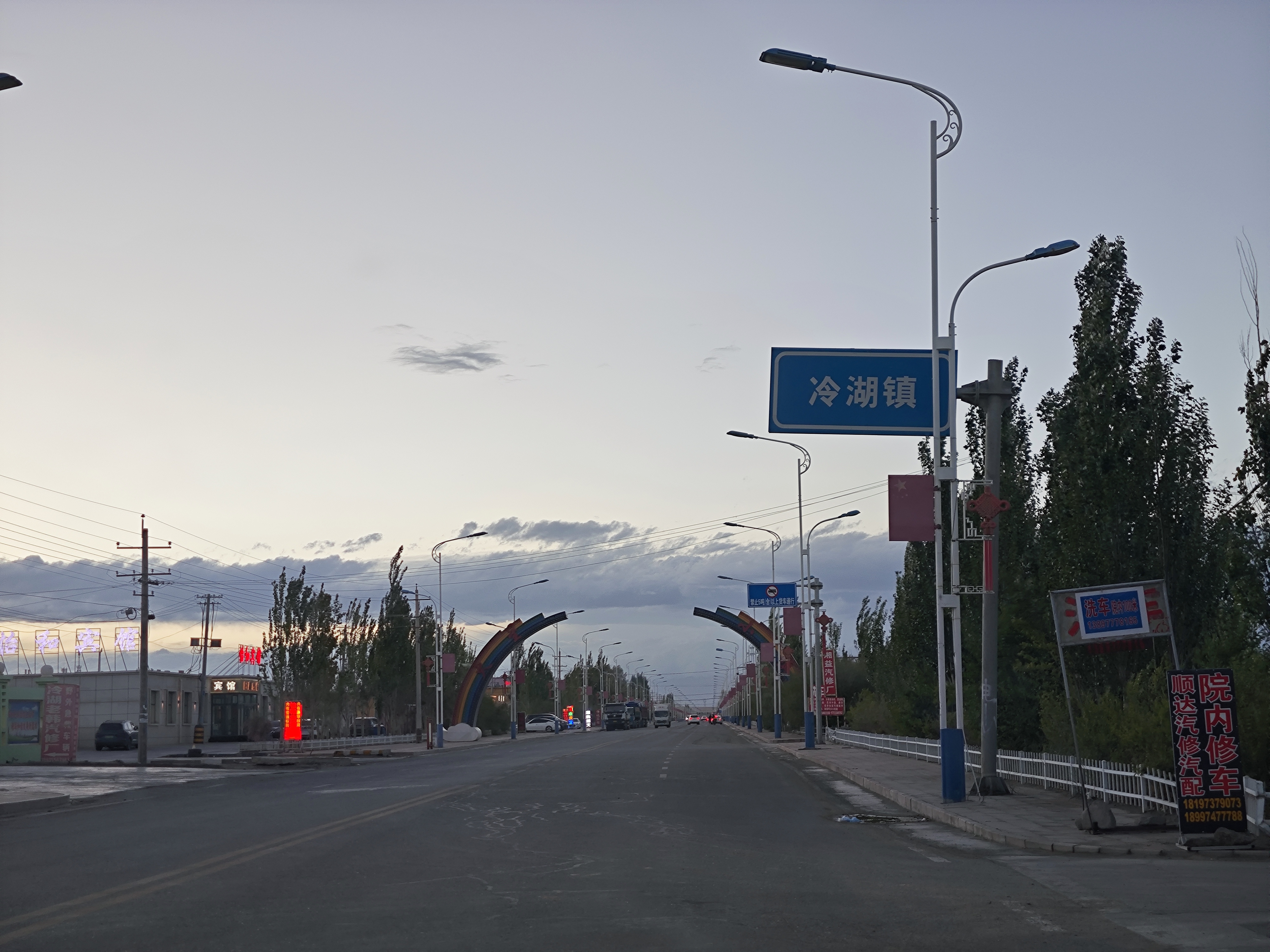
- Entrance of Lenghu Town

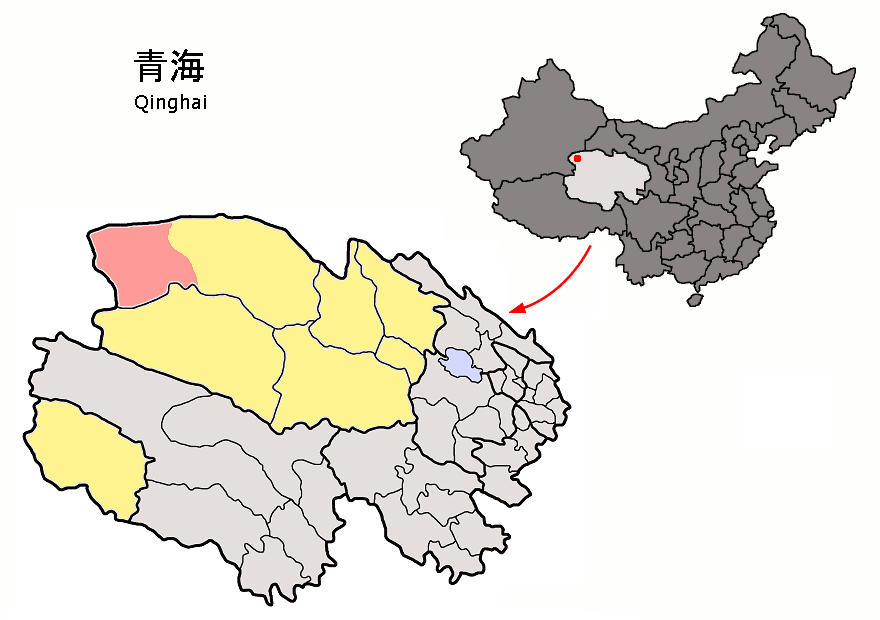
- Mangnai (light red) within Haixi Prefecture (yellow) and Qinghai.

- Location within Qinghai
- Coordinates: 38°15′00″N 90°51′25″E
- Country: China
- Province: Qinghai
- Autonomous prefecture: Haixi
- Seat: Huatugou

Area
  - Total: 49,900 km^{2} (19,300 sq mi)
- Elevation: 3,000 m (9,800 ft)

Population (2020)
  - Total: 18,856
  - Density: 0.378/km^{2} (0.979/sq mi)
- Time zone: UTC+8 (China Standard)
- Website: www.mangya.gov.cn

Mangnai

Chinese name
- Chinese: 茫崖市
Transcriptions
Standard Mandarin
- Hanyu Pinyin: Mángyá Shì (Note: In Central Plains Mandarin it is pronounced Mang-ngai, a transcription of Oirat Mongolian Mangnai. In Standard Mandarin, ngai develops into two different readings with ya the most common one and ai used almost exclusively here. There's a tendency to pronounce it as ya in this situation as well.)

Tibetan name
- Tibetan: མང་ནེ་གྲོང་ཁྱེར།
Transcriptions
- Wylie: mang ne grong khyer
- Tibetan Pinyin: Mangnê Chongkyêr

Mongolian name
- Mongolian script: ᠮᠠᠨᠭᠨᠠᠢ ᠶᠢᠨ ᠬᠣᠲᠠ
Transcriptions
- SASM/GNC: Mangnai hot

Mangnai, also known as Mang'ai or Mangya, is a county-level city in the northwest of Qinghai Province, China, bordering Xinjiang to the north and west. It is under the administration of Haixi Mongol and Tibetan Autonomous Prefecture. It is one of the most remote cities in China, the closest other city, Ruoqiang, is located 350 kilometres (220 mi) away. In 2020 it had a population of 18856. The name Mangnai is based on the Mongolian word for 'forehead'.

It was formed in 2018 when the Mangnai and Lenghu administrative zones merged to establish the county-level city of Mangnai. Mangnai is surrounded by Altyn-Tagh, Lop Nur, Hoh Xil and Qaidam Basin.

== Economy ==
Mangnai had a large asbestos mine, it was the largest in China, it also holds around half of China's serpentine reserves. It also produces oil, natural gas, celestite, and sodium sulfate.

== Administrative divisions ==
Mangnai is divided into 3 towns. The administrative center is the Huatugou Town.

Name	Simplified Chinese	Hanyu Pinyin	Tibetan	Wylie	Mongolian (traditional script)	Mongolian (Cyrillic)	Administrative division code
Towns
Huatugou Town	花土沟镇	Huātǔgōu Zhèn	ཧྭ་ཐུའུ་ཀུའུ་གྲོང་རྡལ།	hwa thu'u ku'u grong rdal	ᠡᠩᠭᠡᠷᠲᠦ ᠪᠠᠯᠭᠠᠰᠤᠨ	Энгэрт балгас	632803100
Mangnai Town	茫崖镇	Mángyá Zhèn	མང་ནེ་གྲོང་རྡལ།	mang ne grong rdal	ᠮᠠᠩᠨᠠᠢ ᠪᠠᠯᠭᠠᠰᠤᠨ	Магнай балгас	632803101
Lenghu Town	冷湖镇	Lěnghú Zhèn	ལེན་ཧུའུ་གྲོང་རྡལ།	len hu'u grong rdal	ᠬᠦᠢᠲᠡᠨ ᠨᠠᠭᠤᠷ ᠪᠠᠯᠭᠠᠰᠤᠨ	Хүйтэн нуур балгас	632803102

== Demographics ==
17 different ethnic groups live in the city, including the Han Chinese, Mongols, Tibetans, the Hui, Salars, Monguors, Manchus, Dongxiangs, and Uighurs.

== Climate ==
Magnai has a cool arid climate (Köppen BWk), very similar to that of Golmud. It is characterised by warm to very warm summers, freezing to frigid winters, large diurnal temperature variation year-round, and extremely low precipitation especially in the cold season from October to April when only 4.9 millimetres or 0.19 inches can be expected in seven months.

Climate data for Mangnai, elevation 2,945 m (9,662 ft), (1991–2020 normals, extremes 1991–present)
Month	Jan	Feb	Mar	Apr	May	Jun	Jul	Aug	Sep	Oct	Nov	Dec	Year
Record high °C (°F)	8.6 (47.5)	13.1 (55.6)	20.7 (69.3)	27.0 (80.6)	29.0 (84.2)	30.7 (87.3)	33.6 (92.5)	34.6 (94.3)	27.2 (81.0)	22.2 (72.0)	14.4 (57.9)	7.7 (45.9)	34.6 (94.3)
Mean daily maximum °C (°F)	−3.2 (26.2)	2.2 (36.0)	8.1 (46.6)	14.0 (57.2)	17.9 (64.2)	21.6 (70.9)	24.1 (75.4)	23.8 (74.8)	19.1 (66.4)	11.9 (53.4)	4.2 (39.6)	−2.3 (27.9)	11.8 (53.2)
Daily mean °C (°F)	−10.7 (12.7)	−5.8 (21.6)	0.1 (32.2)	6.0 (42.8)	10.5 (50.9)	14.7 (58.5)	17.1 (62.8)	16.5 (61.7)	11.6 (52.9)	3.9 (39.0)	−3.7 (25.3)	−9.6 (14.7)	4.2 (39.6)
Mean daily minimum °C (°F)	−17.4 (0.7)	−13.1 (8.4)	−7.5 (18.5)	−1.8 (28.8)	3.2 (37.8)	8.0 (46.4)	10.8 (51.4)	9.9 (49.8)	4.7 (40.5)	−3.4 (25.9)	−10.6 (12.9)	−16.0 (3.2)	−2.8 (27.0)
Record low °C (°F)	−25.6 (−14.1)	−26.5 (−15.7)	−18.5 (−1.3)	−15.0 (5.0)	−8.6 (16.5)	−1.6 (29.1)	3.4 (38.1)	−0.1 (31.8)	−5.3 (22.5)	−12.2 (10.0)	−20.3 (−4.5)	−24.5 (−12.1)	−26.5 (−15.7)
Average precipitation mm (inches)	0.8 (0.03)	0.6 (0.02)	0.8 (0.03)	1.5 (0.06)	6.1 (0.24)	11.5 (0.45)	13.6 (0.54)	7.8 (0.31)	4.5 (0.18)	0.8 (0.03)	0.1 (0.00)	0.3 (0.01)	48.4 (1.9)
Average precipitation days (≥ 0.1 mm)	0.9	0.8	1.0	1.4	3.0	5.9	7.3	4.1	1.7	0.9	0.4	0.5	27.9
Average snowy days	1.6	1.5	2.0	2.3	1.8	0.2	0	0	0.1	1.2	0.6	1.3	12.6
Average relative humidity (%)	36	28	24	23	26	32	36	32	30	28	30	37	30
Mean monthly sunshine hours	227.3	224.8	263.2	275.2	285.9	261.4	263.9	270.2	270.0	282.3	239.7	223.5	3,087.4
Percentage possible sunshine	74	73	70	69	64	59	59	65	74	83	80	76	71
Source: China Meteorological Administration

== Tourism ==
The main touristic sites in Mangnai are:

- Emerald Lake (Chinese: 翡翠湖)
- Qianfo cliffs (Chinese: 千佛崖; lit. 'thousand Buddha cliffs')
- Gasi Lake (Chinese: 尕斯湖)
- Yingxiongling Danxia Landform (Chinese: 丹霞地貌英雄岭)
- Alar Wetland (Chinese: 阿拉尔湿地)
- Yardang landform (Chinese: 雅丹地貌)

In 2019, a camp meant to simulate conditions on the planet Mars opened in the town of Lenghu, which is primarily geared towards tourists.

== Transport ==
Mangnai is located strategically on one of the main transport corridors between Gansu and Xinjiang. The Haixi Huatugou Airport serves Mangnai and the city is served by the Golmud–Korla railway and is located along China National Highway 315.
