= Lenghu =

Lenghu 冷湖 · ᠯᠧᠩᠬᠤ ᠵᠢᠨ · ལེང་ཧུའུ་སྲི་
- Town
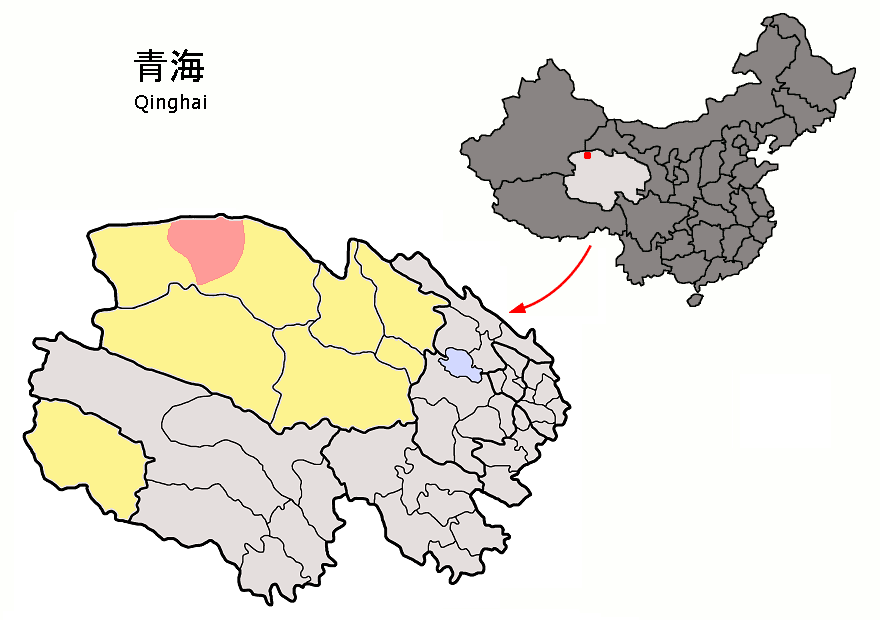
- Location of Lenghu (red) in Haixi Prefecture (yellow) and Qinghai

- Location of the seat in Qinghai
- Coordinates: 38°23′N 93°22′E
- Country: China
- Province: Qinghai
- Autonomous prefecture: Haixi
- County-level city: Mangnai
- Time zone: UTC+8 (China Standard)
- Postal code: 817400

Lenghu (Chinese: 冷湖; pinyin: Lěnghú) is a town in Mangnai, Haixi Mongol and Tibetan Autonomous Prefecture. It is located in the northwest of Qinghai province, China, bordering Gansu to the north/northeast and Xinjiang to the northwest.

== History ==
In 2018, the Mangnai and Lenghu administrative zones merged to established the county-level city of Mangnai.

== Geography ==
Lenghu borders Da Qaidam to the east, Mangnai to the west, Aksai Kazakh Autonomous County (Gansu) to the north, and Ruoqiang County (Xinjiang) to the northwest, and is part of the northwestern Qaidam Basin in an area dotted frequently by yardangs.

=== Climate ===
As with most of northwestern Qinghai, Lenghu has an arid climate (Köppen BWk), with long, cold winters, and warm summers. It is the driest locale in the country, with only 16.1 mm (0.63 in) of precipitation annually, and it is not uncommon for months to pass by without any rainfall, though underground water resources are plentiful. The monthly 24-hour average temperature drops to −12.5 °C (9.5 °F) in January and rises to 17.1 °C (63 °F) in July, while the annual mean is 2.82 °C (37.1 °F); diurnal temperature variation is wide, averaging 17.4 °C (31.3 °F) annually. The area is also extremely sunny; with monthly percent possible sunshine ranging from 72% in July to 85% in October, the area receives 3,443 hours of bright sunshine annually.

Climate data for Lenghu, elevation 2,770 m (9,090 ft), (1991–2020 normals, extremes 1971–2010)
Month	Jan	Feb	Mar	Apr	May	Jun	Jul	Aug	Sep	Oct	Nov	Dec	Year
Record high °C (°F)	8.9 (48.0)	12.4 (54.3)	19.6 (67.3)	27.1 (80.8)	28.2 (82.8)	33.1 (91.6)	35.7 (96.3)	35.9 (96.6)	30.0 (86.0)	21.5 (70.7)	13.0 (55.4)	6.7 (44.1)	35.9 (96.6)
Mean daily maximum °C (°F)	−2.6 (27.3)	1.8 (35.2)	7.1 (44.8)	13.6 (56.5)	18.4 (65.1)	22.8 (73.0)	25.5 (77.9)	24.7 (76.5)	19.5 (67.1)	11.8 (53.2)	4.3 (39.7)	−1.6 (29.1)	12.1 (53.8)
Daily mean °C (°F)	−12.1 (10.2)	−7.5 (18.5)	−1.8 (28.8)	4.7 (40.5)	10.3 (50.5)	15.4 (59.7)	18.1 (64.6)	16.8 (62.2)	11.1 (52.0)	2.5 (36.5)	−5.3 (22.5)	−11.1 (12.0)	3.4 (38.2)
Mean daily minimum °C (°F)	−19.7 (−3.5)	−15.6 (3.9)	−10.2 (13.6)	−4.0 (24.8)	1.7 (35.1)	7.3 (45.1)	10.5 (50.9)	9.2 (48.6)	3.5 (38.3)	−5.3 (22.5)	−13.0 (8.6)	−18.5 (−1.3)	−4.5 (23.9)
Record low °C (°F)	−32.0 (−25.6)	−30.9 (−23.6)	−29.2 (−20.6)	−19.3 (−2.7)	−12.5 (9.5)	−5.0 (23.0)	0.7 (33.3)	−4.0 (24.8)	−10.3 (13.5)	−18.4 (−1.1)	−26.5 (−15.7)	−30.2 (−22.4)	−32.0 (−25.6)
Average precipitation mm (inches)	0.6 (0.02)	0.2 (0.01)	0.2 (0.01)	0.4 (0.02)	1.9 (0.07)	3.8 (0.15)	4.5 (0.18)	3.4 (0.13)	2.5 (0.10)	0.3 (0.01)	0 (0)	0.2 (0.01)	18 (0.71)
Average precipitation days (≥ 0.1 mm)	1.0	0.3	0.4	0.4	1.1	2.1	3.6	2.5	1.3	0.3	0.2	0.6	13.8
Average snowy days	1.3	0.7	0.7	0.5	0.8	0	0	0	0	0.6	0.5	0.9	6
Average relative humidity (%)	37	30	26	24	25	29	32	31	30	30	34	39	31
Mean monthly sunshine hours	228.4	232.0	280.6	303.0	327.7	306.9	307.3	306.3	284.8	285.3	239.0	222.0	3,323.3
Percentage possible sunshine	75	76	75	76	74	69	69	74	78	84	80	76	76
Source: China Meteorological Administration
