= Golmud River =

River in People's Republic of China

Golmud River 格尔木河
- The mouth of the Golmud at Dabusun Lake
- Native name: ᠭᠤᠤᠯᠮᠤᠳ (Mongolian)

Location
- Country: China
- Province: Qinghai
- Prefecture: Haixi
- County: Golmud

Physical characteristics
- Mouth: Dabusun Lake
  - coordinates: 36°59′33″N 95°05′49″E
- Basin size: 18,648 km^{2} (7,200 sq mi)

Golmud River

Chinese name
- Traditional Chinese: 格爾木河
- Simplified Chinese: 格尔木河
- Postal: Naichi Gol
- Literal meaning: Rivers (in Mongolian)
Transcriptions
Standard Mandarin
- Hanyu Pinyin: Gé'ěrmù Hé
- Wade–Giles: Ke-erh-mu Ho

Tibetan name
- Tibetan: ན་གོར་མོ།
Transcriptions
- Wylie: Na-gor-mo

Mongolian name
- Mongolian Cyrillic: ᠭᠤᠤᠯᠮᠤᠳ
Transcriptions
- SASM/GNC: Golmud

The Golmud or Ge'ermu River is a river in Golmud County, Haixi Prefecture, Qinghai Province, China. It flows north from the Kunlun Mountains to Dabusun and (occasionally) West Dabusun Lakes in the central Qarhan Playa in the southeastern Qaidam Basin. The county seat Golmud lies along it.

== Names ==
Golmud is a romanization of a Mongolian word meaning "rivers". Ge'ermu is the pinyin romanization of the Mandarin pronunciation of the same name's transcription into Chinese characters; it is sometimes misspelled Geermu. Ko-erh-mu was the same name romanized using the Wade–Giles system. The Wylie romanization of the Tibetan form of the name is Nagormo.

It was formerly known as the Naichi Gol, from a town near its headwaters.

== Geography ==
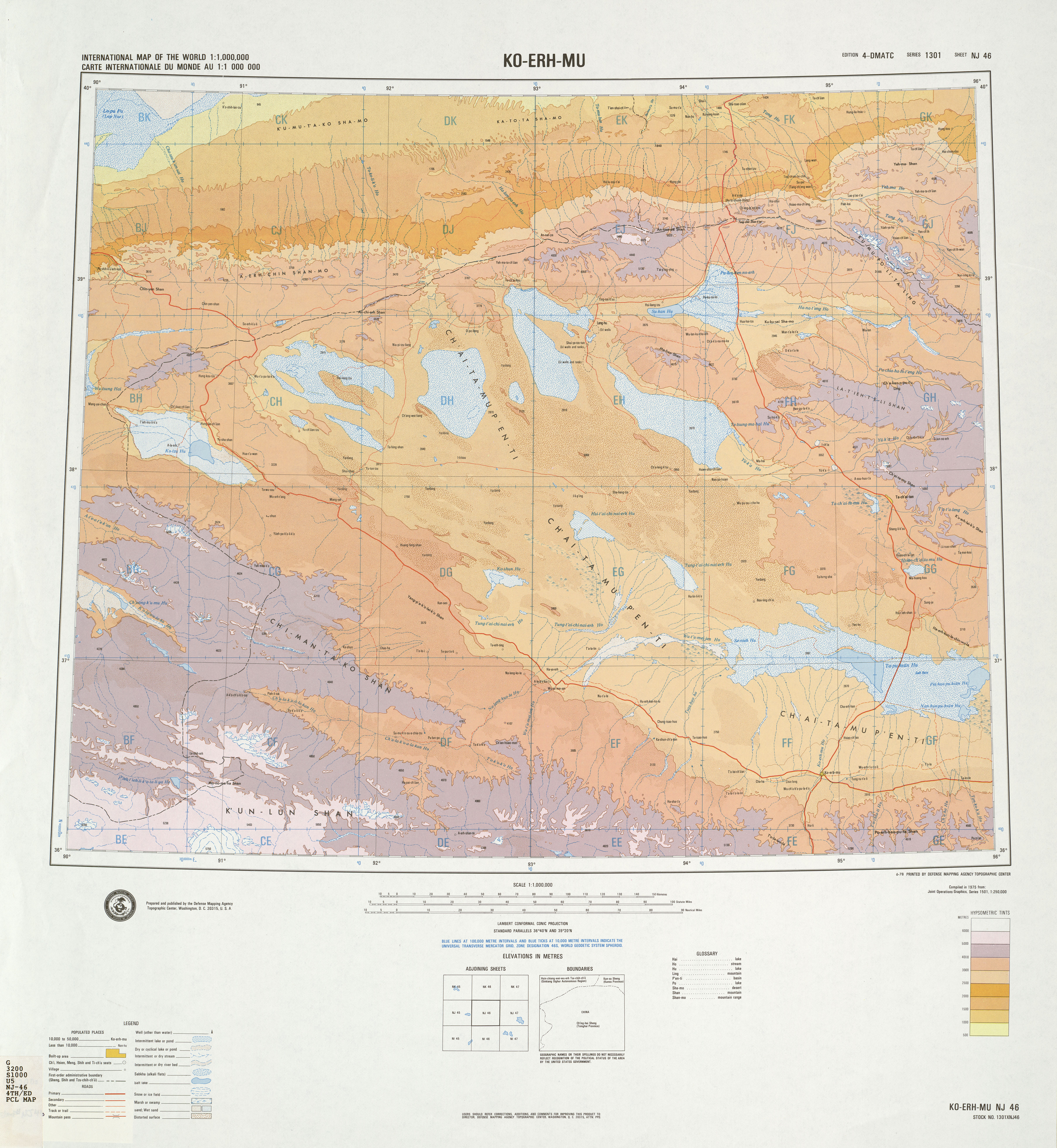
Map including Golmud River (labeled as Ko-erh-mu Ho) and surrounding region (DMA, 1975)

The Golmud flows north from the Kunlun Mountains, past Golmud, to a wide alluvial fan along the central part of the south side of the Qarhan Playa. For most of the year, only a small stream reaches Dabusun Lake but meltwater from the mountain glaciers sometimes floods into the other channels, spreading from West Dabusun Lake in the west, along the entire southern shore of Dabusun in the middle, and to Tuanjie Lake in the east.

== See also ==
- List of rivers of China
