= HTT =

HTT may refer to:

- Hawthorn Tramways Trust, a defunct tram operator in Melbourne, Australia
- Higher Topos Theory, a treatise on higher category theory by American mathematician Jacob Lurie
- Ho-kago Tea Time (English: After School Tea Time), the name of the school band from the manga and anime K-On!
- Huatugou Airport, in Qinghai, China
- Human Terrain Team of the United States Army
- The gene that encodes Huntingtin
- Hybrid turbocharger
- Hyper-threading, on Intel microprocessors
- Hyperloop Transportation Technologies, an American technology company
