= South Suli Lake =

- 南涩聂湖 (Chinese)
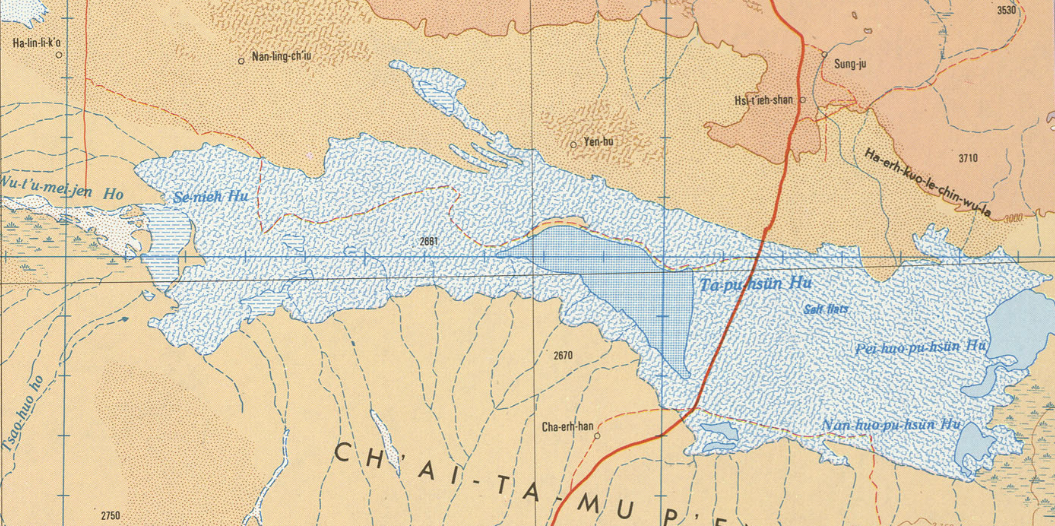
- A map of the Qarhan Playa (1975), with Suli Lake (Se-nieh Hu) in the far west and S. Suli Lake (unlabeled) below it

- Location within Qinghai
- Location: Golmud County; Haixi Prefecture; Qinghai Province; China
- Coordinates: 36°58′45″N 94°16′20″E
- Type: Endorheic saline lake
- Primary inflows: Zaohuo River
- Basin countries: China
- Surface area: 0–1.5 km^{2} (0.00–0.58 sq mi)
- Surface elevation: 2,675 m (8,780 ft)

South Suli Lake
- Traditional Chinese: 南澀聶湖
- Simplified Chinese: 南涩聂湖
Transcriptions
Standard Mandarin
- Hanyu Pinyin: Nánsèniè Hú; Nán Sèniè Hú
- Wade–Giles: Nan-se-nieh Hu; Nan Se-nieh Hu

Little Suli Lake
- Traditional Chinese: 小澀聶湖
- Simplified Chinese: 小涩聂湖
Transcriptions
Standard Mandarin
- Hanyu Pinyin: Xiǎosèniè Hú; Xiǎo Sèniè Hú
- Wade–Giles: Hsiao-se-nieh Hu; Hsiao Se-nieh Hu

New Suli Lake
- Traditional Chinese: 新澀聶湖
- Simplified Chinese: 新涩聂湖
Transcriptions
Standard Mandarin
- Hanyu Pinyin: Xīnsèniè Hú; Xīn Sèniè Hú
- Wade–Giles: Hsin-se-nieh Hu; Hsin Se-nieh Hu

South, Little, or New Suli or Senie Lake is a small ephemeral lake in Golmud County, Haixi Prefecture, Qinghai Province, China. It lies in the southwest corner of the Qarhan Playa in the southeast Qaidam Basin. It is part of Qarhan's Bieletan subbasin, located south of Suli Lake and west of Dabiele Lake. It is principally fed from the southwest by the Zaohuo or Little Zaohuo River (小灶火河, Xiǎozàohuǒ Hé) and consists of a 1.5 km^{2} (0.58 sq mi) basin which gradually evaporates into three smaller ponds. As part of the Bieletan subbasin, it is rich in lithium chloride.

It takes its name from its position relative to the larger Suli Lake, itself supposedly a transcription of a Mongolian placename derived from the word for "temples" or "sideburns".

== See also ==
- Qarhan Playa & Qaidam Basin
- List of lakes & saltwater lakes of China
