= Aridity =

Term for regions characterized by a severe lack of available water

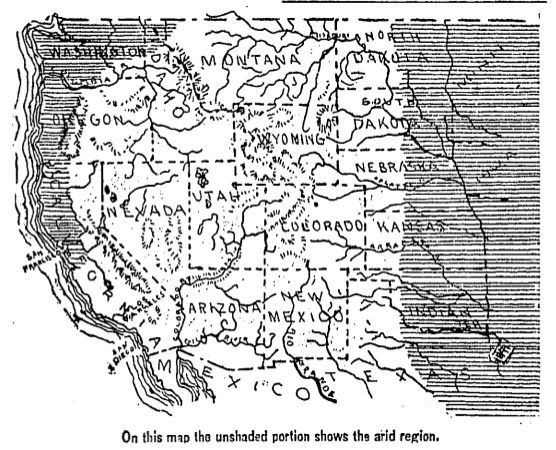
Arid regions of the Western United States as mapped in 1893

Aridity is a condition of geographical regions characterized by low annual precipitation, increased temperatures, and limited water availability. These areas, which make up approximately 43% of total global available land area, tend to fall upon degraded soils, and their health and functioning are key necessities of regulating ecosystems’ atmospheric components.

== Change over time ==
The distribution of aridity at any time is largely the result of the general circulation of the atmosphere. The latter does change significantly over time through climate change. For example, temperature increase by 1.5–2.1 percent across the Nile Basin over the next 30–40 years could change the region from semi-arid to arid, significantly reducing the land usable for agriculture. In addition, changes in land use can increase demands on soil water and thereby increase aridity.

A December 2024 report from the UNCCD concluded that more than three-quarters of the Earth's land "has become permanently dryer in recent decades", that "drier climates now affecting vast regions across the globe will not return to how they were", and that a quarter of the global population lives in expanding drylands.

== See also ==
- Arid Forest Research Institute
- Aridity index
- Desiccation tolerance
- Drought
- Humidity
- Vapor pressure
