= Xitieshan railway station =

Railway station in Qinghai, China

Xitieshan railway station (Chinese: 锡铁山站) is a station on the Chinese Qingzang Railway. It is located in Haixi Mongol and Tibetan Autonomous Prefecture, in the eastern part of the Qaidam Basin.

A short branch rail line runs from Xitieshan railway station to the nearby Xitieshan Lead Mine (锡铁山铅矿; 37°18′50″N 95°33′30″E).

== See also ==
- Qingzang Railway
- List of stations on Qingzang railway

Preceding station	China Railway	Following station
Dachaidan East towards Xining	Qinghai–Tibet railway	Songrugou towards Lhasa
