= Huatugou =

Town in Mangnai, Haixi, Qinghai, China

Huatugou 花土沟
- Town
- Interactive map of Huatugou
- Coordinates: 38°15′09″N 90°51′27″E
- Country: China
- Province: Qinghai
- Autonomous prefecture: Haixi
- County-level city: Mangnai

Area
  - Total: 29,973 km^{2} (11,573 sq mi)
- Elevation: 2,700 m (8,900 ft)

Population (2023)
  - Total: 28,965
  - Density: 0.96637/km^{2} (2.5029/sq mi)
- Time zone: UTC+8 (China Standard)

Huatugou or Huatugouzhen (lit. Huatugou Town) is a town in Mangnai, Haixi, Qinghai, China. As of 2023, the population is 28,965, most of which are ethnic Han Chinese.

Huatugou is served by the nearby Huatugou Airport.

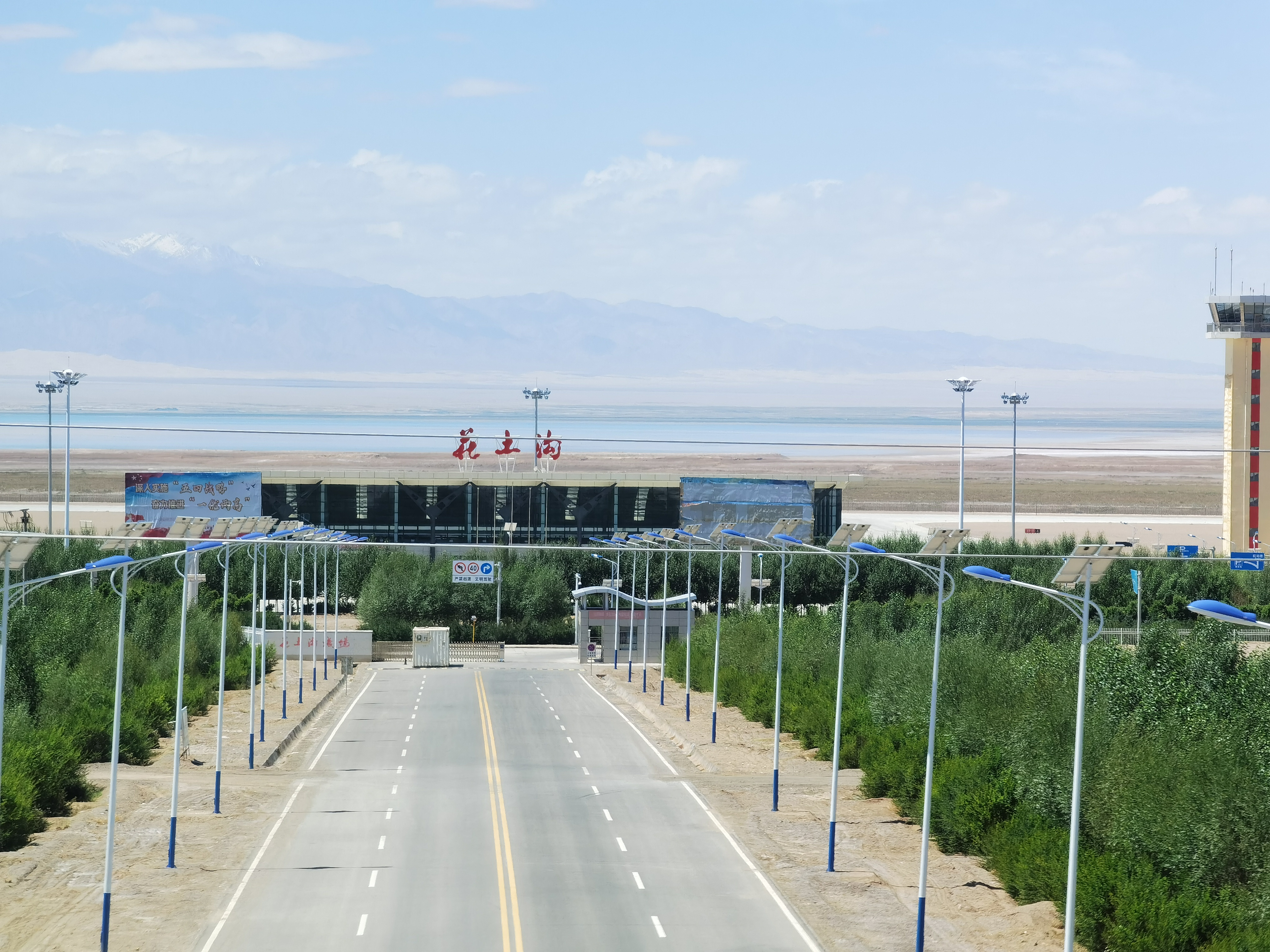
Haixi Huatugou Airport terminal building

== Administration ==
Huatugou has the following village-level administrative divisions under its administration:

- Tuanjie Road Community Residents' Committee
- Pinganxiang Community Residents' Committee
- Kunlun Road Community Residents' Committee
- Youlong Road Community Residents' Committee
- Dalangtan Community Residents' Committee
- Jinshan Road Community Residents' Committee
- Gangci Pastoral Committee
- Mohe'erbuluke Pastoral Committee
- Daiersen Pastoral Committee
