= Dachaidan East railway station =

Railway station in Chaidan Town, Da Qaidam, Haixi, China

Coordinates: 37°19′25″N 95°52′20″E

Dachaidan East railway station (Chinese: 大柴旦东站; pinyin: Dàcháidàndōng Zhàn) is a station on the Qinghai–Tibet Railway. It is located in Yinmaxia Village, Chaidan Town, Da Qaidam, Haixi Mongol and Tibetan Autonomous Prefecture, in the eastern part of the Qaidam Basin, China.

== History ==
=== Yinmaxia railway station (before 2026) ===
Passenger service at Yinmaxia Railway Station is very limited; as of the later 2013, just one train a day stops there.

The station is the junction point where the future Golmud–Dunhuang Railway will join the Qinghai–Tibet Railway.

== See also ==
- Qinghai–Tibet Railway
- List of stations on Qinghai–Tibet railway

== Notes ==
Preceding station	China Railway	Following station
Hangya towards Xining	Qinghai–Tibet railway	Xitieshan towards Lhasa
