= Haixi Mangnai Airport =

Haixi Mangnai Airport 海西茫崖机场
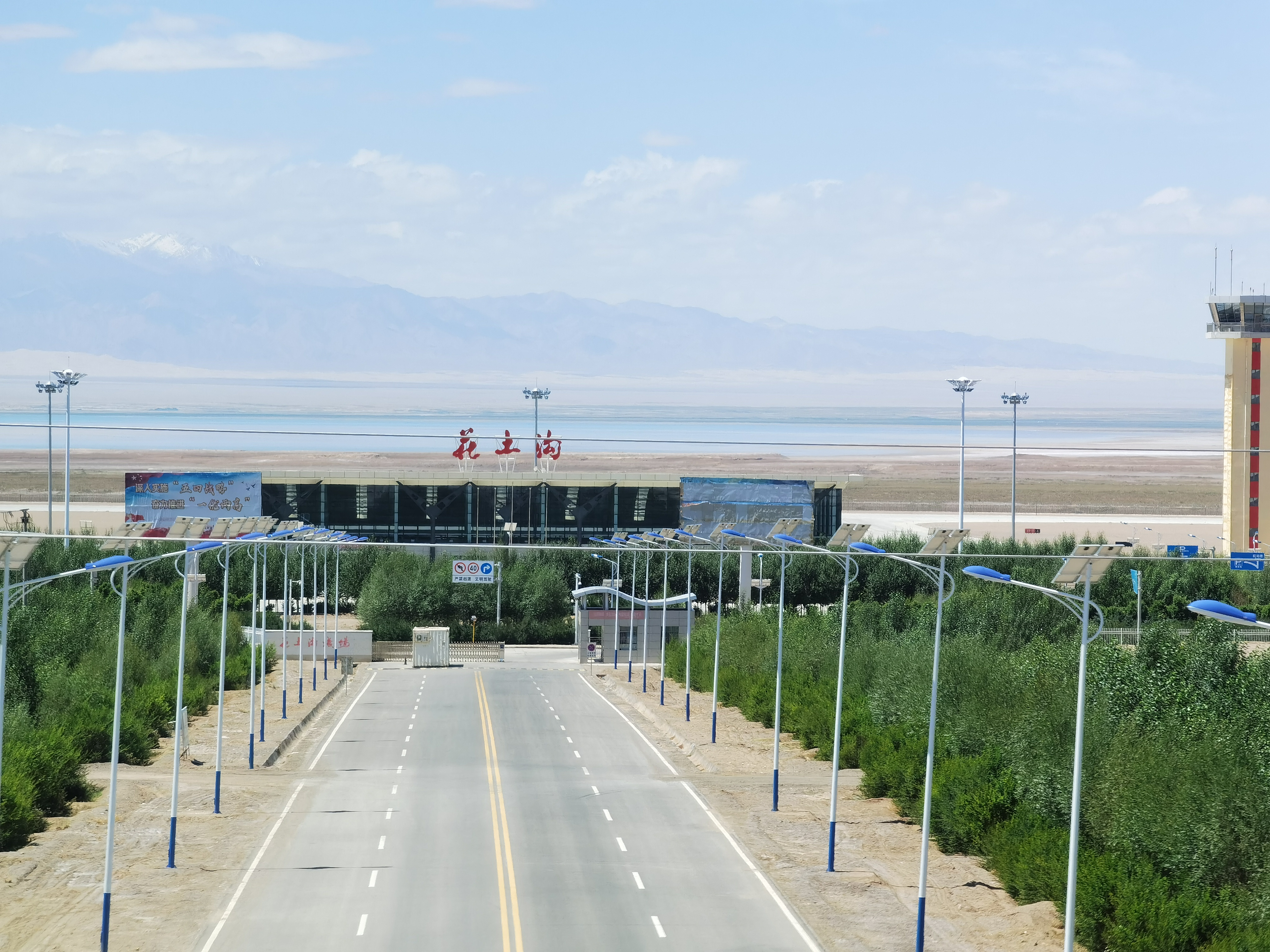
- IATA: HTT; ICAO: ZLHX

Summary
- Airport type: Public
- Operator: China West Airport Group
- Serves: Mangnai
- Location: Huatugou, Qinghai, China
- Opened: 26 June 2015
- Elevation AMSL: 2,945 m / 9,662 ft
- Coordinates: 38°11′51″N 090°50′30″E
- Website: huatugou.cwag.com

Map
- Location of airport in Qinghai

Runways
Direction	Length		Surface
Direction	m	ft	Surface
15/33	3,600	11,811

Statistics (2021)
- Passengers: 64,747
- Aircraft movements: 800
- Cargo (metric tons): 100.9

Haixi Mangnai Airport
- Simplified Chinese: 海西茫崖机场
- Traditional Chinese: 海西茫崖機場
Transcriptions
Standard Mandarin
- Hanyu Pinyin: Hǎixī Mángyá Jīchǎng

Haixi Mangnai Airport (IATA: HTT, ICAO: ZLHX) is an airport in Mangnai, a county-level city of Haixi Mongol and Tibetan Autonomous Prefecture in Qinghai Province, China. The airport is located near the town of Huatugou, at an altitude of 2,945 metres (9,662 ft) above sea level. Construction began on 30 December 2011 with an estimated total investment of 700 million yuan. The airport was opened on 26 June 2015.

== Facilities ==
The airport has a runway that is 3,600 meters long, and a 3,000-square-meter terminal building. It is projected to handle 90,000 passengers annually by 2020.

== Airlines and destinations ==
Airlines	Destinations
China Eastern Airlines	Delingha, Dunhuang, Xining

== See also ==
- List of airports in China
- List of the busiest airports in China
- List of highest airports
