= Golmud =

City in Qinghai Province, China

Golmud 格尔木市 · ᠭᠤᠤᠯᠮᠤᠳ ᠬᠣᠲᠠ · ན་གོར་མོ་གྲོང་ཁྱེར། Golmo
- County-level & Sub-prefectural city
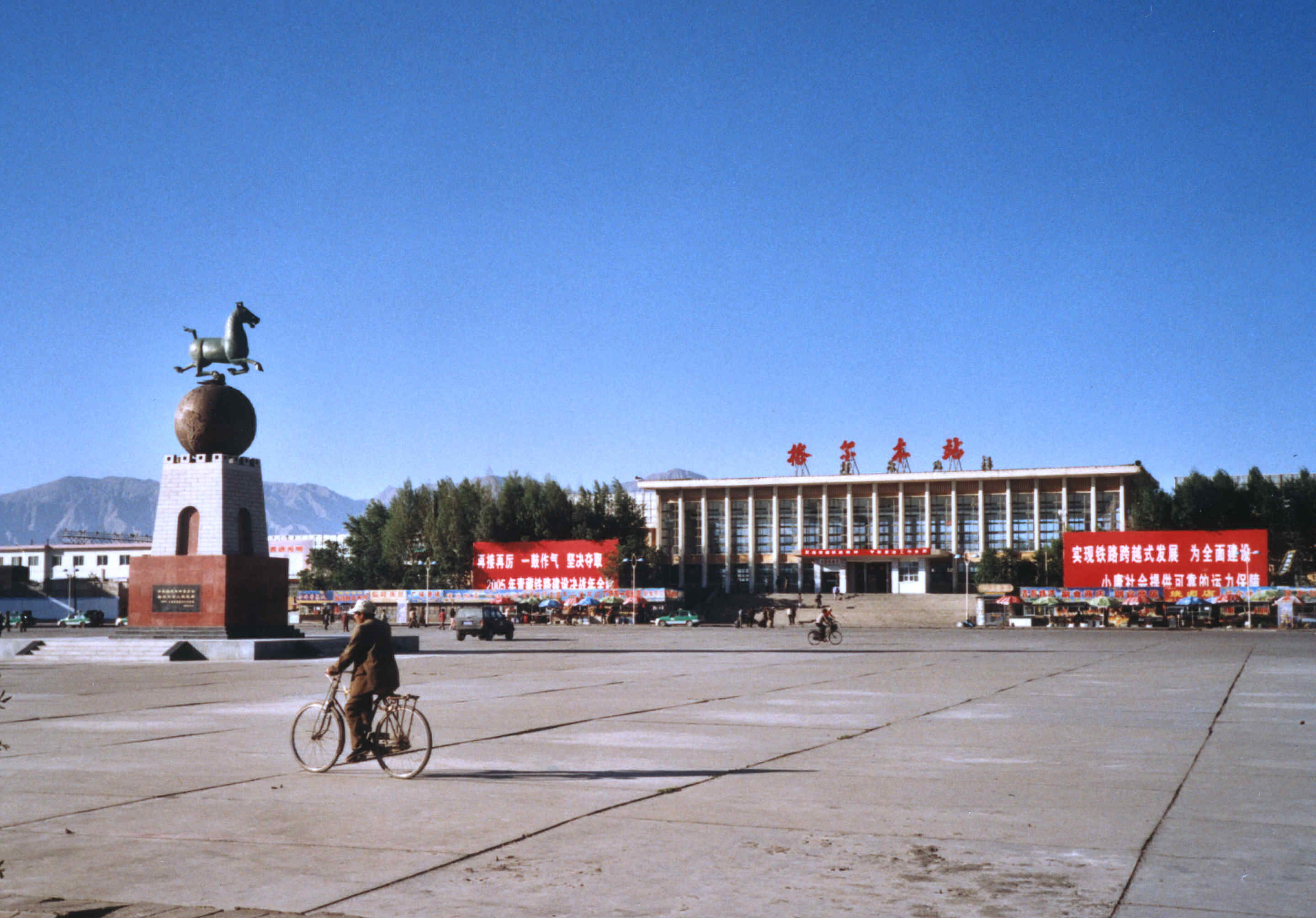
- Golmud railway station

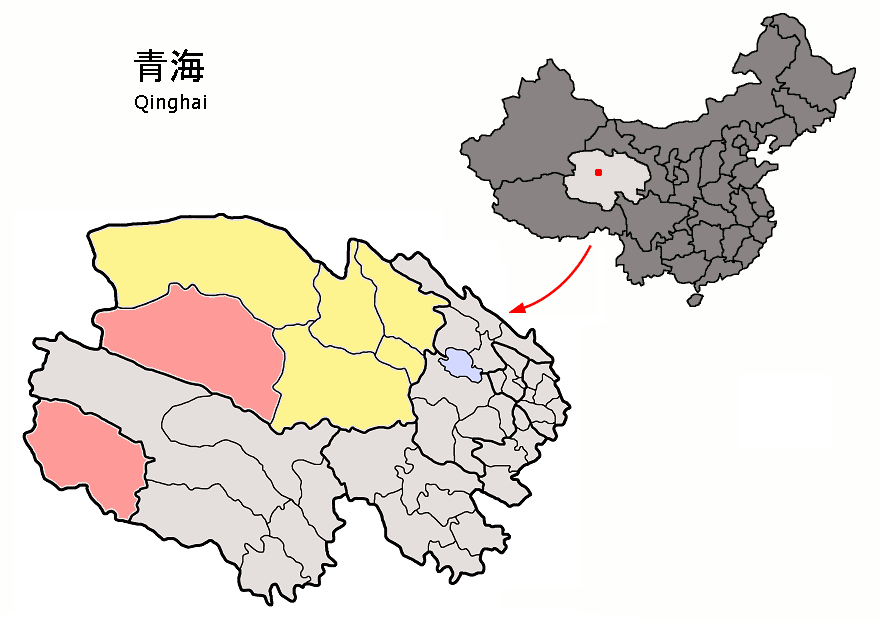
- Location of Golmud City (red) in Haixi Prefecture (yellow) and Qinghai

- Location of the city centre in Qinghai
- Coordinates (Golmud government): 36°24′26″N 94°55′42″E
- Country: China
- Province: Qinghai
- Autonomous prefecture: Haixi
- Municipal seat: Kunlun Road Subdistrict

Area
  - County-level & Sub-prefectural city: 119,165 km^{2} (46,010 sq mi)
  - Urban: 72 km^{2} (28 sq mi)
- Elevation: 2,809 m (9,216 ft)

Population (2020)
  - County-level & Sub-prefectural city: 221,863
  - Density: 1.86181/km^{2} (4.82207/sq mi)
  - Urban: 197,153
  - Urban density: 2,700/km^{2} (7,100/sq mi)
- Time zone: UTC+8 (China Standard)
- Website: www.geermu.gov.cn

Golmud

Chinese name
- Simplified Chinese: 格尔木
- Traditional Chinese: 格爾木
- Postal: Golmot
- Literal meaning: Rivers (in Mongolian)
Transcriptions
Standard Mandarin
- Hanyu Pinyin: Gé'ěrmù
- Wade–Giles: Ko-erh-mu

Tibetan name
- Tibetan: ན་གོར་མོ།
Transcriptions
- Wylie: Na-gor-mo

Mongolian name
- Mongolian script: ᠭᠤᠤᠯᠮᠤᠳ

Golmud (Note: Also known by various other romanizations) is a county-level city in the Haixi Mongol and Tibetan Autonomous Prefecture of Qinghai Province, China. It is now the second-largest city in Qinghai and the third largest on the Tibetan Plateau (after Xining and Lhasa). The population in 2020 was 221,863.

== Name ==
Golmud is a romanization of Oirat Голмуд, meaning "rivers". Ge'ermu is the pinyin romanization of the Mandarin pronunciation of the same name's transcription into Chinese characters; it is sometimes spelled Geermu. Ko-erh-mu was the same name romanized using the Wade–Giles system; Golmot was the romanization used by the Chinese Postal Map. The Wylie romanization of the Tibetan form of the name is Nagormo.

== History ==
Golmud is a young city. It was first established in 1954 when the Transportation regiments of Qinghai-Tibet Corps set up a food distribution base, staffed by 10 people, at the current location. In May of that year, construction on the Qinghai-Tibet Highway commenced. Scientific exploration of the mineral resources of Qarhan were undertaken in the 1950s, leading to the discovery of the area's potash and gas fields. Systematic surveying was undertaken in the 1960s and 1970s, with the railway permitting industrial exploitation from the 1980s. The first oil pipeline and potassium fertilizer factory were opened in 1989. The 28 km^{2} (11 sq mi) Golmud Kunlun Economic Development Zone was opened in 1992. In 2004, a second pipeline arrived. In the 2010s, an influx of further investment followed realization of the importance of the Sanhu's supplies of lithium and rare earths for modern personal electronics and electric cars. In 2016, over 85% of goods movement with Tibet passed through Golmud.

== Administrative divisions ==
Golmud is divided into 5 subdistricts, 2 towns, 2 townships:

Name	Simplified Chinese	Hanyu Pinyin	Tibetan	Wylie	Mongolian (traditional script)	Mongolian (Cyrillic)	Administrative division code
Subdistricts
Kunlun Road Subdistrict	昆仑路街道	Kūnlúnlù Jiēdào	ཁུ་ནུ་སྲང་ལམ།	khu nu srang lam	ᠺᠦᠨᠯᠦᠨ ᠵᠠᠮ ᠤᠨ ᠵᠡᠭᠡᠯᠢ ᠭᠤᠳᠤᠮᠵᠢ	Кунлүн замын зээл гудамж	632801001
Huanghe Road Subdistrict	黄河路街道	Huánghélù Jiēdào	རྨ་ཆུ་ལམ་སྲང་ལམ།	rma chu lam srang lam	ᠬᠤᠸᠠᠩ ᠾᠧ ᠵᠠᠮ ᠤᠨ ᠵᠡᠭᠡᠯᠢ ᠭᠤᠳᠤᠮᠵᠢ	Хуан ге замын зээл гудамж	632801002
Jinfeng Road Subdistrict	金峰路街道	Jīnfēnglù Jiēdào	གསེར་རིའི་སྲང་ལམ།	gser ri'i srang lam	ᠵᠢᠨ ᠹᠧᠩ ᠵᠠᠮ ᠤᠨ ᠵᠡᠭᠡᠯᠢ ᠭᠤᠳᠤᠮᠵᠢ	Гийн фен замын зээл гудамж	632801003
Hexi Subdistrict	河西街道	Héxī Jiēdào	ཆུའི་རུབ་སྲང་ལམ།	chu'i rub srang lam	ᠭᠣᠣᠯ ᠤᠨ ᠪᠠᠷᠠᠭᠤᠨᠳᠠᠬᠢ ᠵᠡᠭᠡᠯᠢ ᠭᠤᠳᠤᠮᠵᠢ	Голын баруунтах зээл гудамж	632801004
Xizang Road Subdistrict	西藏路街道	Xīzànglù Jiēdào	བོད་ལྗོངས་ལམ་སྲང་ལམ།	bod ljongs lam srang lam	ᠪᠠᠷᠠᠭᠤᠨ ᠲᠥᠪᠡᠳ ᠵᠠᠮ ᠳ᠋ᠠᠬᠢ ᠵᠡᠭᠡᠯᠢ ᠭᠤᠳᠤᠮᠵᠢ	Баруун төвд зам даахь зээл гудамж	632801005
Towns
Golmud Town	郭勒木德镇	Guōlèmùdé Zhèn	ཀོལ་མོ་གྲོང་རྡལ།	kol mo grong rdal	ᠭᠣᠣᠯᠮᠤᠳ ᠪᠠᠯᠭᠠᠰᠤᠨ	Голмд балгас	632801100
Dangla Town	唐古拉镇	Tánggǔlā Zhèn	ལྡང་ལ་གྲོང་རྡལ།	ldang la grong rdal			632801101
Townships
Gêlêg Qênboi Township	大格勒乡	Dàgélè Xiāng	དགེ་ལེགས་ཆེན་པོའི་ཡུལ་ཚོ།	dge legs chen po'i yul tsho	ᠳᠠᠭᠤᠷ ᠰᠤᠮᠤᠨ	Дагуур суман	632801200
Urt Moron Township	乌图美仁乡	Wūtúměirén Xiāng	བུ་ཐུར་མེད་རིན་ཡུལ་ཚོ།	bu thur med rin yul tsho	ᠤᠷᠲᠤᠮᠥ᠋ᠷᠡᠨ ᠰᠤᠮᠤᠨ	Уртмран суман	632801201

Others:

- Qairhan Administrative Committee (察尔汗行政委员会)
- Golmud Agricultural Reclamation Co., Ltd (格尔木农垦有限公司)

== Demographics ==
In 2017, the population of the total area of Golmud was approximately 240,494. A 2018 publication by the National Ethnic Affairs Commission reported that ethnic Han Chinese comprise 69.82% of the city's population, and minority ethnic groups comprise 30.18%. The city's is home to 33 ethnic minorities, of which, the largest are the Mongols, Tibetans, and Hui people.

== Geography ==
Golmud is part of Haixi Prefecture in western Qinghai Province. Despite being nominally a "city", the built-up urban area of Golmud comprises only 72 km^{2} (28 sq mi) of the county's 124,500 square kilometres (48,100 sq mi). Most of the county lies in the southern Qaidam Basin and in the foothills of the Kunlun Mountains. A large southern exclave is administered as the "town" of Tanggula, separated from the rest of the county by the western panhandle of the Yushu Tibetan Autonomous Prefecture. The northern part borders Xinjiang to its northwest; the southern exclave borders the Tibetan Autonomous Region to its southwest.

Golmud proper is at an elevation of 2,809 m (9,216 ft). It grew up alongside the Golmud River, which gave it its name.

North of Golmud is the Qarhan Playa, a 5,856 km^{2} (2,261 sq mi) salt flat with about ten perennial salt lakes. The largest is Dabusun Lake, which receives the waters of the Golmud. The more important smaller lakes are Suli, South Suli, Dabiele, Xiaobiele, Tuanjie, Xiezuo, Dongling, and North and South Hulsan, which receive the waters of smaller inflowing streams. Qarhan is part of the larger Sanhu Depression, which includes East and West Taijinar Lakes. Other major lakes in the southern exclave of Golmud include Ulan Ul Lake (Chinese: 乌兰乌拉湖; pinyin: Wūlán Wūlā Hú) and Migriggyangzham Co (Chinese: 赤布张错; pinyin: Chìbùzhāng Cuò, Standard Tibetan: མི་རིག་རྒྱང་གྲམ་མཚོ).

=== Climate ===
Golmud has a cold arid climate (Köppen BWk), with long, cold winters, and warm summers. The monthly 24-hour average temperature drops to −8.4 °C (16.9 °F) in January and rises to 18.5 °C (65 °F) in July, while the annual mean is 5.76 °C (42.4 °F). Precipitation is very low, totaling only 45 millimetres (1.77 in) per annum, falling on 28 days, most of which are during the summer. Relative humidity averages only 32%, with all months below 40%, some of the lowest levels nationally. With monthly percent possible sunshine ranging from 62% in July to 81% in November, the city receives 3,096 hours of bright sunshine annually.

Climate data for Golmud, elevation 2,808 m (9,213 ft), (1991–2020 normals, extremes 1951–2020)
Month	Jan	Feb	Mar	Apr	May	Jun	Jul	Aug	Sep	Oct	Nov	Dec	Year
Record high °C (°F)	13.9 (57.0)	18.0 (64.4)	24.7 (76.5)	31.3 (88.3)	31.0 (87.8)	32.7 (90.9)	34.0 (93.2)	35.5 (95.9)	31.0 (87.8)	26.4 (79.5)	20.6 (69.1)	10.0 (50.0)	35.5 (95.9)
Mean daily maximum °C (°F)	−0.5 (31.1)	4.4 (39.9)	9.7 (49.5)	15.6 (60.1)	19.7 (67.5)	23.2 (73.8)	25.7 (78.3)	25.0 (77.0)	20.4 (68.7)	13.7 (56.7)	6.4 (43.5)	0.4 (32.7)	13.6 (56.6)
Daily mean °C (°F)	−7.9 (17.8)	−3.5 (25.7)	1.9 (35.4)	8.0 (46.4)	12.6 (54.7)	16.6 (61.9)	18.8 (65.8)	18.0 (64.4)	13.2 (55.8)	5.8 (42.4)	−1.5 (29.3)	−7.1 (19.2)	6.2 (43.2)
Mean daily minimum °C (°F)	−13.6 (7.5)	−9.8 (14.4)	−4.5 (23.9)	1.3 (34.3)	5.9 (42.6)	10.5 (50.9)	12.6 (54.7)	12.1 (53.8)	7.5 (45.5)	−0.1 (31.8)	−7.3 (18.9)	−12.6 (9.3)	0.2 (32.3)
Record low °C (°F)	−33.6 (−28.5)	−26.6 (−15.9)	−26.1 (−15.0)	−13.4 (7.9)	−7.8 (18.0)	−5.2 (22.6)	1.9 (35.4)	−1.4 (29.5)	−8.2 (17.2)	−20.2 (−4.4)	−25.4 (−13.7)	−28.5 (−19.3)	−33.6 (−28.5)
Average precipitation mm (inches)	1.0 (0.04)	0.6 (0.02)	0.9 (0.04)	1.6 (0.06)	5.0 (0.20)	9.3 (0.37)	13.4 (0.53)	7.8 (0.31)	4.9 (0.19)	0.7 (0.03)	0.8 (0.03)	0.7 (0.03)	46.7 (1.85)
Average precipitation days (≥ 0.1 mm)	1.9	1.0	1.4	1.3	3.1	4.8	6.4	4.1	3.2	0.8	1.0	1.2	30.2
Average snowy days	3.2	2.5	2.6	2.0	0.8	0	0	0	0.1	1.1	1.5	2.0	15.8
Average relative humidity (%)	38	29	25	23	27	34	37	35	34	31	32	38	32
Mean monthly sunshine hours	211.4	207.6	258.2	275.4	289.6	260.2	270.3	269.8	249.5	269.5	234.4	217.6	3,013.5
Percentage possible sunshine	68	67	69	69	66	60	61	65	68	79	77	73	69
Source: China Meteorological Administration, NOAA

Climate data for Xiaozaohuo, Golmud, elevation 2,767 m (9,078 ft), (1991–2020 normals)
Month	Jan	Feb	Mar	Apr	May	Jun	Jul	Aug	Sep	Oct	Nov	Dec	Year
Mean daily maximum °C (°F)	−0.8 (30.6)	4.1 (39.4)	9.6 (49.3)	15.6 (60.1)	20.0 (68.0)	23.8 (74.8)	26.3 (79.3)	25.4 (77.7)	20.7 (69.3)	13.6 (56.5)	6.2 (43.2)	0.1 (32.2)	13.7 (56.7)
Daily mean °C (°F)	−10.3 (13.5)	−5.6 (21.9)	0.5 (32.9)	6.8 (44.2)	11.9 (53.4)	16.1 (61.0)	18.2 (64.8)	17.2 (63.0)	12.2 (54.0)	4.0 (39.2)	−3.7 (25.3)	−9.7 (14.5)	4.8 (40.6)
Mean daily minimum °C (°F)	−18.4 (−1.1)	−14.1 (6.6)	−7.8 (18.0)	−1.5 (29.3)	3.9 (39.0)	8.5 (47.3)	10.6 (51.1)	9.7 (49.5)	4.8 (40.6)	−3.8 (25.2)	−11.5 (11.3)	−17.4 (0.7)	−3.1 (26.5)
Average precipitation mm (inches)	0.5 (0.02)	0.2 (0.01)	0.5 (0.02)	0.7 (0.03)	3.6 (0.14)	7.1 (0.28)	7.9 (0.31)	5.4 (0.21)	3.6 (0.14)	0.6 (0.02)	0.4 (0.02)	0.3 (0.01)	30.8 (1.21)
Average precipitation days (≥ 0.1 mm)	1.1	0.6	0.8	0.7	2.7	4.0	5.6	3.5	2.4	0.5	0.7	0.7	23.3
Average snowy days	2.2	1.3	2.0	1.4	0.8	0	0	0	0	0.9	1.2	1.3	11.1
Average relative humidity (%)	38	29	27	27	28	33	38	36	35	33	36	39	33
Mean monthly sunshine hours	227.6	216.6	262.8	276.4	291.0	264.2	271.7	272.6	256.2	276.7	243.8	231.3	3,090.9
Percentage possible sunshine	73	70	70	70	66	60	61	66	70	81	81	78	71
Source: China Meteorological Administration

== Economy ==
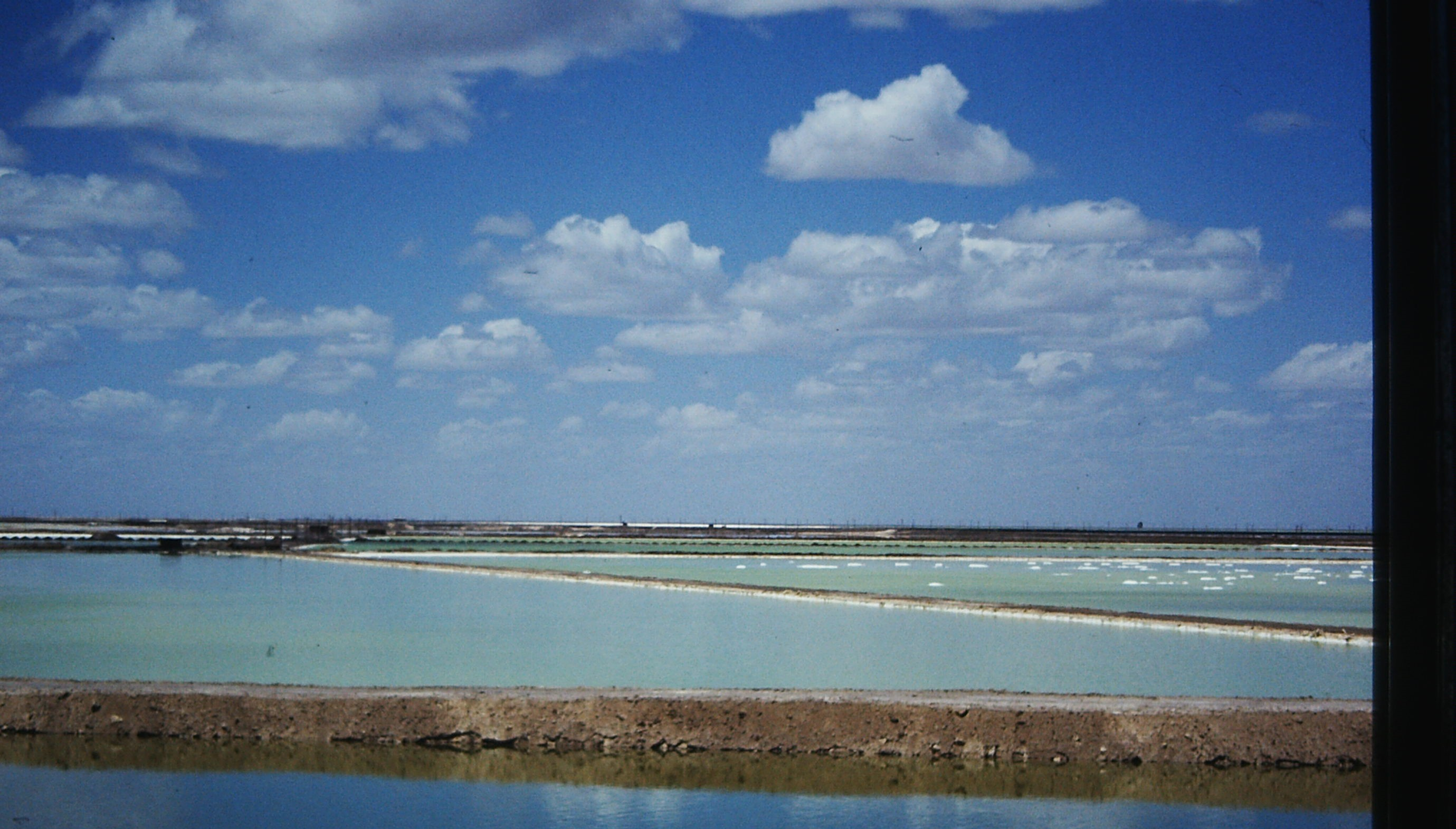
Salt harvesting in Golmud (Qinghai) in summer 1993

The Qarhan Playa has China's largest reserves of salt, potassium, and magnesium, as well as other valuable minerals. Taken together, the mineral resources in the playa were estimated to be worth over 15 trillion renminbi (RMB) as of 2002. The area's salt has also trapped valuable hydrocarbons. The Sebei-1 and Sebei-2 fields near Suli Lake are also China's 4th-largest onshore reserves of natural gas and the entire area may have reserves as high as 1 trillion m^{3} (35 trillion cu. ft.). The larger Sanhu Depression includes East and West Taijinar, which hold China's largest reserves of lithium.

The surrounding countryside also produces gold, copper, jade, lead, and zinc.

A pipeline delivers crude oil from Huatugou Oilfield to a refinery at Golmud. The refinery has a capacity of 1 million metric tons a year; is able to produce 100,000 metric tons a year of methanol and 20,000 MT/yr of polypropylene; and has a 100,000 MT/yr gas fractionator.

According to the National Ethnic Affairs Commission, the per capita disposable income in Golmud was 6,852 yuan in the first quarter of 2017, a 9.3% increase from the one year prior. Golmud has been one of the areas included in China's Targeted Poverty Alleviation program, which the Commission states has entailed the reconstruction of houses in the city with subpar living conditions, and subsidizing low-income students in the city. The commission also states that the government has been developing the production of traditional woodworking, embroidery, and other local crafts through designated "demonstration areas" (Chinese: 示范区; pinyin: shìfàn qū).

Statistics for 2001 show that the city's nominal GDP totaled 2.213 billion RMB, a rise of 31.9% from the previous year and the highest growth rate since 1990.

== Transportation ==
=== Railway ===
Golmud lies along the Qinghai–Tibet railway, a 1,956 km (1,215 mi) railway that starts from Xining and ends at Lhasa in the Tibet Autonomous Region. The Golmud-Lhasa section, with a length of 1,142 km (710 mi), was the last and most challenging part of the railway to be completed. After five years of construction, the first train for Lhasa left Golmud on 1 July 2006.

In October 2012 construction started on the Golmud–Dunhuang Railway. It will actually branch off the Qinghai–Tibet Railway at the Yinmaxia station north of Golmud, and will cross the Qaidam Basin and the Altyn-Tagh/Qilian system on the way to Dunhuang in the neighboring Gansu province.

The Golmud-Korla Railway running north west from Golmud into Korla, Xinjiang began construction in November 2014 and was completed in 2020.

=== Highways ===
- The Golmud-Lhasa highway, extending 1,050 km (650 mi), is part of the 1,930-km Qinghai-Tibet highway (China National Highway 109) connecting Xining and Lhasa.
- China National Highway 215, runs north from Golmud to Dunhuang, Gansu

=== Airport ===
- Golmud Airport

== Twin towns – sister cities ==
Golmud is twinned with:

- Bharatpur, Nepal
- Dobrich, Bulgaria
- Kiryat Malakhi, Israel
