= Narin Gol River =

- Native name: 那仁郭勒河 (Chinese); 那棱格勒河 (Chinese)

Location
- Country: China

Physical characteristics
- Length: 435 kilometres

The Narin Gol River (Chinese: 那仁郭勒河, 那棱格勒河), sometimes spelled Narin-Gol River, also known as Narenguole River, or Nalenggele River, is an inland river in Qinghai Province of China, located in the Qaidam Basin, with a length of 435 kilometres, a catchment area of about 21,898 square kilometers, and an average annual runoff volume of about 1.07 billion cubic metres. The river is the largest river in the Qaidam Basin, stemming from Bukedaban, the highest peak of East Kunlun.

According to the Naren Gol Hydrological Station (那仁郭勒水文站), the runoff volume of Narin Gol River accounts for 59.6 per cent of the annual volume during the rich water period in summers, and 6 per cent of the annual volume during the dry water period in winters.
