= Qaidam Basin =

Ecoregion in Qinghai, China

- Tsaidam Basin or Chaidamu Basin
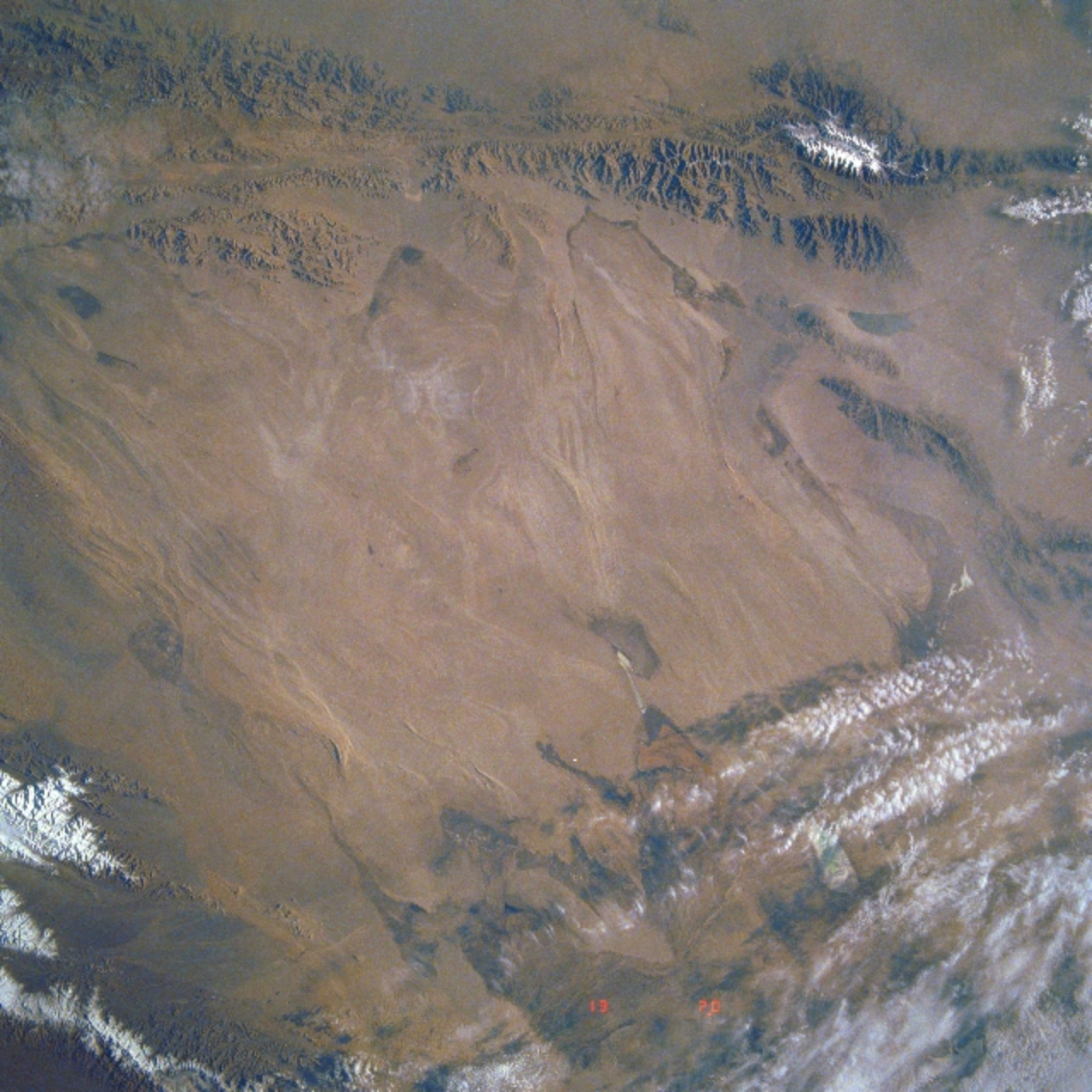
- Qaidam Basin

- Location within Qinghai Location within China
- Interactive map of Qaidam Basin
- Location: Haixi Prefecture, Qinghai Province
- Coordinates: 37°16′N 94°27′E
- Type: Hyperarid basin
- Part of: Qinghai–Tibet Plateau
- Basin countries: China
- Surface area: 120,000 km^{2} (46,000 sq mi)
- Surface elevation: 3,000 m (10,000 ft)

Qaidam Basin

Chinese name
- Traditional Chinese: 柴達木盆地
- Simplified Chinese: 柴达木盆地
- Postal: Zaidam Swamp
- Literal meaning: Qaidam Lowlands
Transcriptions
Standard Mandarin
- Hanyu Pinyin: Cháidámù Péndì
- Wade–Giles: Ch‘ai-ta-mu P‘en-ti

Tibetan name
- Tibetan: ཚྭའི་འདམ་
Transcriptions
- Wylie: Tshwa'i 'Dam
- Tibetan Pinyin: Caidam

Mongolian name
- Mongolian Cyrillic: Цайдам
Transcriptions
- SASM/GNC: Qaidam; Tsajdam

Qaidam Desert
- Traditional Chinese: 柴達木盆地沙漠
- Simplified Chinese: 柴达木盆地沙漠
- Literal meaning: Qaidam Lowland Desert
Transcriptions
Standard Mandarin
- Hanyu Pinyin: Cháidámù Péndì Shāmò
- Wade–Giles: Ch‘ai-ta-mu P‘en-ti Sha-mo

The Qaidam, Tsaidam, or Chaidamu Basin is a hyperarid basin that occupies a large part of Haixi Prefecture in Qinghai Province, China. The basin covers an area of approximately 120,000 km^{2} (46,000 sq mi), one-fourth of which is covered by saline lakes and playas. Around one third of the basin, about 35,000 km^{2} (14,000 sq mi), is desert.

== Name ==
Tshwa'i 'Dam is the Wylie romanization of the Tibetan name ཚྭའི་འདམ་, meaning "Salt Marsh"; the Tibetan Pinyin romanization of the same name is Caidam. Qaidam is the GNC romanization of its transcription into Mongolian; Tsaidam is a variant romanization of the same name. Chaidamu is the pinyin romanization of its transcription into Chinese characters; the same name was formerly romanized as the Zaidam Swamp for the Chinese Postal Map.

== Geography ==
Orographically, the Qaidam Basin is a comparatively low area in the northeastern part of the Qinghai–Tibet Plateau. With an elevation of around 3,000 m (10,000 ft), Qaidam forms a kind of shelf between Tibet to the south (around 4,300 m or 14,000 ft) and Gansu to the north (around 1,100 m or 3,500 ft). A low water divide separates the Qaidam Basin proper from that of Qinghai Lake to the east. Despite this lower elevation, Qaidam is still high enough that its mean annual temperature is 2–4 °C (36–39 °F) despite lying on the same latitude as Algeria, Greece, and Virginia in the United States.

The crescent-shaped basin covers an area of approximately 120,000 km^{2} (46,000 sq mi). Its substrate is broadly divided into three blocks: the Mangya Depression, a northern fault zone, and the Sanhu Depression. Qaidam is an intermontane basin, surrounded on all sides by mountain ranges. In the south, the Kunlun Mountains separate it from the higher central section of the Tibetan Plateau. In the north, a number of smaller ridges like the Shulenanshan separate it from another higher plateau, which usually referenced by the name of its northern escarpment, the Qilian or Nanshan. In the northwest, the Altyn-Tagh separates it from the Kumtagh Desert of southeastern Xinjiang.

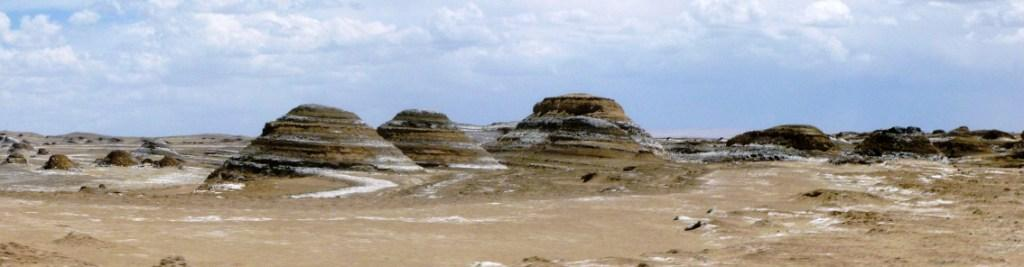
Yardangs ("yadans") in the Qaidam Desert

Because of this position, Qaidam forms an endorheic basin accumulating lakes with no outlet to the sea. The area is among the most arid non-polar locations on Earth, with some places reporting an aridity index of 0.008–0.04. Across the entire basin, the mean annual rainfall is 26 mm (1 in) but the mean annual evaporation is 3,000–3,200 mm (120–130 in). Because of the low rainfall, these lakes have become saline or dried up completely. Presently, there are four main playas in the basin: Qarhan in the southeast and (from north to south) Kunteyi, Chahanshilatu, and Dalangtan in the northwest. These playas and a few other saline lakes occupy over one-fourth of the basin, with the sediments deposited since the Jurassic as deep as 10 to 14 km (6–9 mi) in places despite tectonic activity having repeatedly shifted the center of the region's sedimentation. The seasonal nature and commercial exploitation of some of the lakes makes an exact count problematic: one count reckoned there were 27 lakes in the basin, another reckoned 43 with a total area of 16,509 km^{2} (6,374 sq mi).

The aridity, salinity, wide diurnal and seasonal temperature swings, and relatively high ultraviolet radiation has led to Qaidam being studied by the China Geological Survey as a Mars analogue for use in testing spectroscopy and equipment for China's 2020 Mars rover program.

== Geological history ==
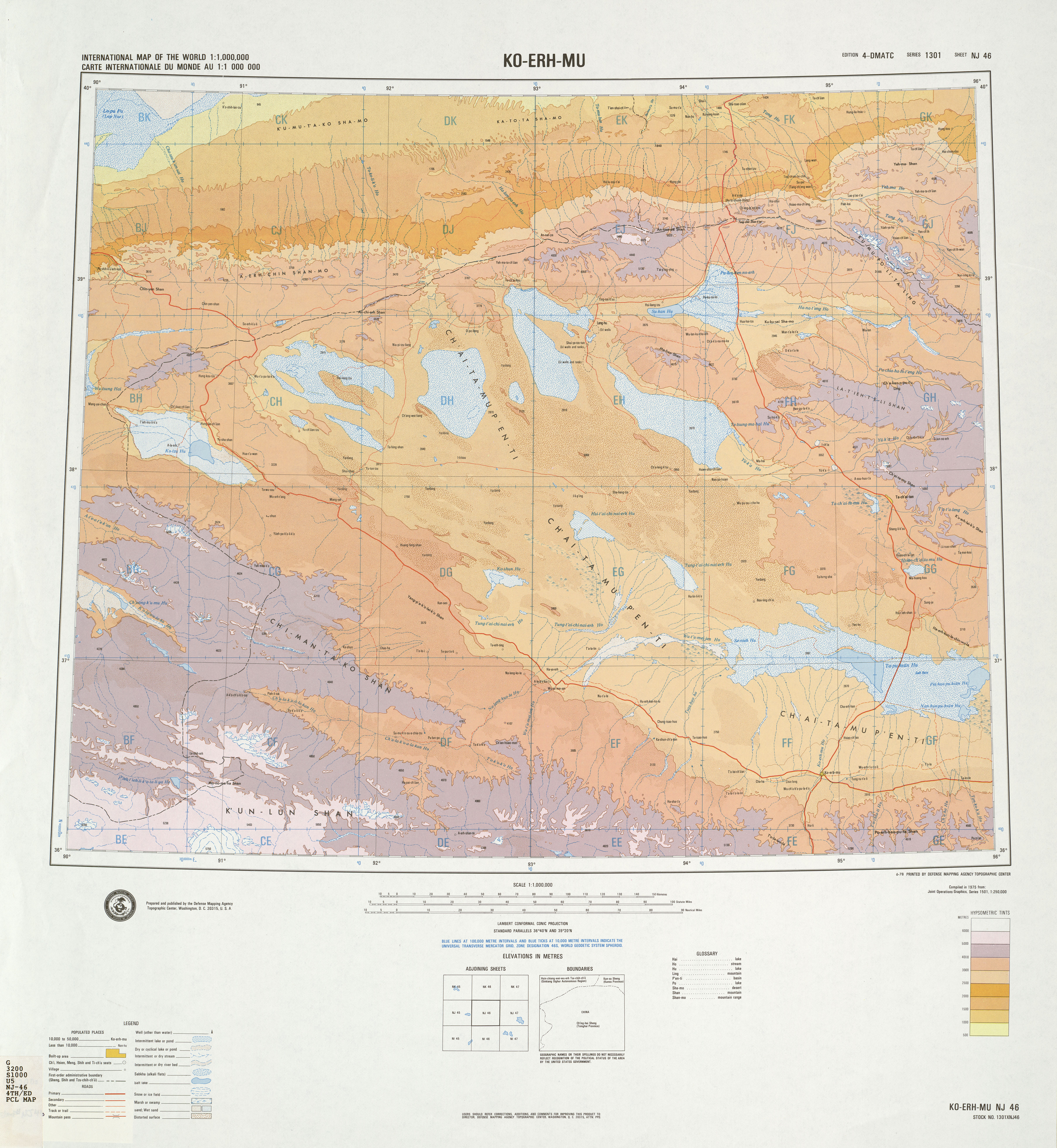
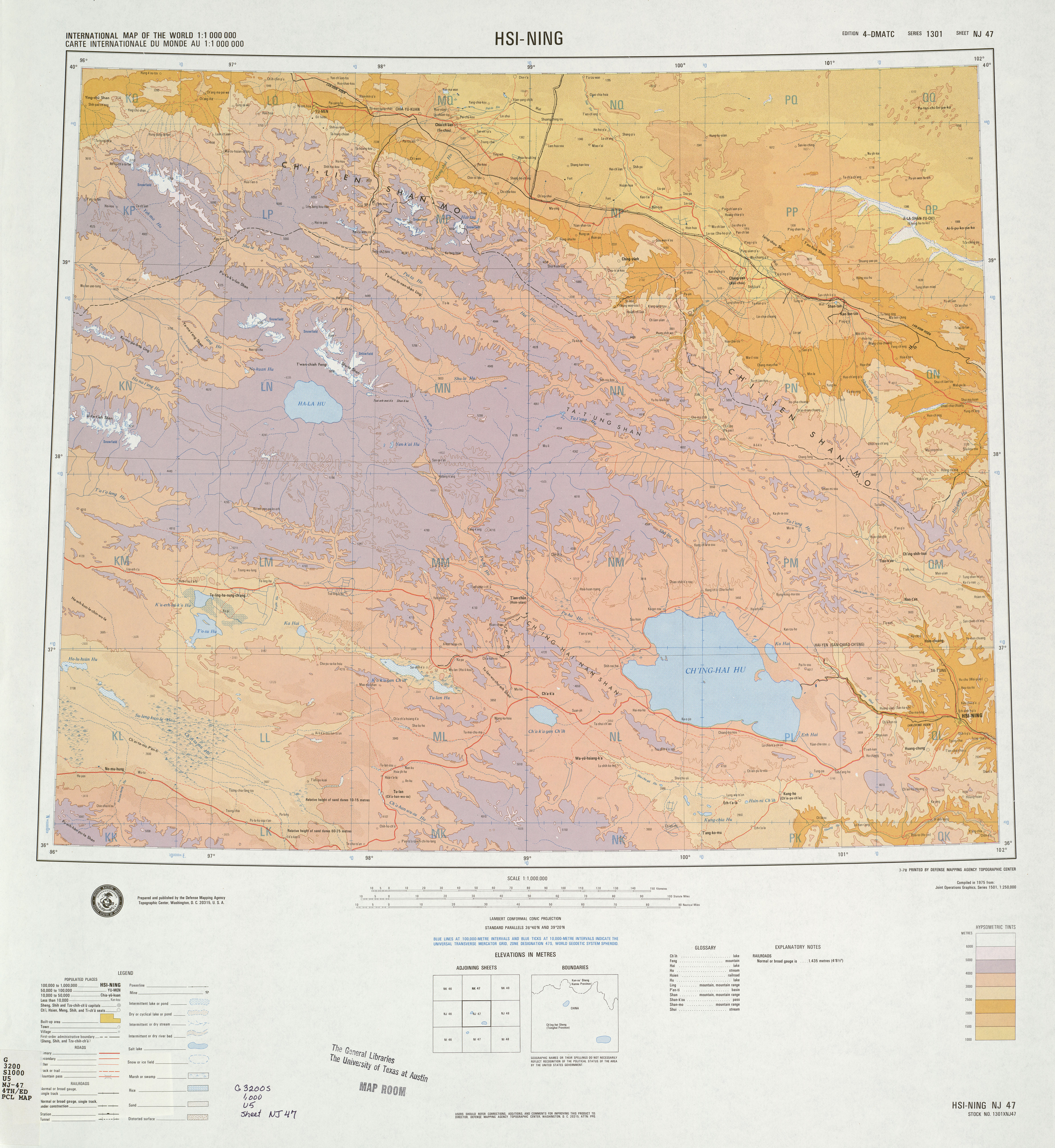
Detailed US Army maps of Qaidam, c. 1975 (names given in Wade-Giles romanization)

Qaidam was part of the North China Craton from at least 1 billion years ago, before breaking off c. 560 million years ago at the end of the Neoproterozoic. It was an island in a shallow sea until uplift beginning around 400 Ma finally rejoined it to the mainland by 200 Ma.

Three-dimensional modeling shows that the present basin has been squeezed to an irregular diamond shape since the beginning of the Cenozoic, with the Indian Plate beginning to impact the ancient Tibetan shoreline somewhere between 55–35 Ma. At first, Qaidam was at a far lower elevation. Pollen found in core samples shows that the Oligocene (34–23 Ma) was relatively humid. A great lake slowly formed in the western basin, which two major tectonic movements raised and cut off from its original sources of sediment. At its greatest extent during the Miocene (23–5 Ma), this lake spread at the present 2,800 m (9,200 ft) elevation contour over 300 km (190 mi) and was among the largest lakes in the world. Nutrient-rich inflows contributed to plankton blooms, which supported an ecosystem that built up reserves of organic carbon. The Tibetan plateau's uplift, however, eventually cut it off from the warm and humid Indian monsoon. It went from a forest steppe to a desert. By 12 Ma, the climate had dried enough to break Qaidam's single lake into separate basins, which frequently became saline. During the Pliocene (5–2.5 Ma), the focus of most sedimentation was at what is now Kunteyi but, during the Pleistocene (after 2.5 Ma), tectonic activity shifted the basin's tributaries and floor, moving the focus of sedimentation from the Dalangtan to Qarhan area. During this time, the record's glacial intervals suggest a low-temperature climate and its sandstone yardangs attest to strong winds.

From 770,000 and 30,000 years ago, the enormous lake which filled much of the southeastern basin alternated nine times between being a fresh- and saltwater lake. Pollen studies suggest the bed of Dabusun Lake in the Qarhan Playa—nearly the lowest point of the basin—was elevated about 700 m (2,300 ft) within the last 500,000 years. At around 30 kya, this great—at the time, freshwater—lake spread over at least 25,000 km^{2} (9,700 sq mi) with a surface 50–60 m (160–200 ft) above the present levels of its successors. At the same time, a river from the "Kunlun" paleolake to its south was enriching the Sanhu region with enormous reserves of lithium derived from hot springs near Mount Buka Daban which now feed into the Narin Gol River that flows into East Taijinar Lake.

Around 30 kya, the lake in the Kunluns dried up and the Qarhan was cut off from sufficient inflows of fresh water. It became saline again, beginning to precipitate salts about 25,000 years ago. The basin's continuing formation and evolution is controlled by the Altyn Tagh fault constituting the northern basin boundary.

== Resources ==
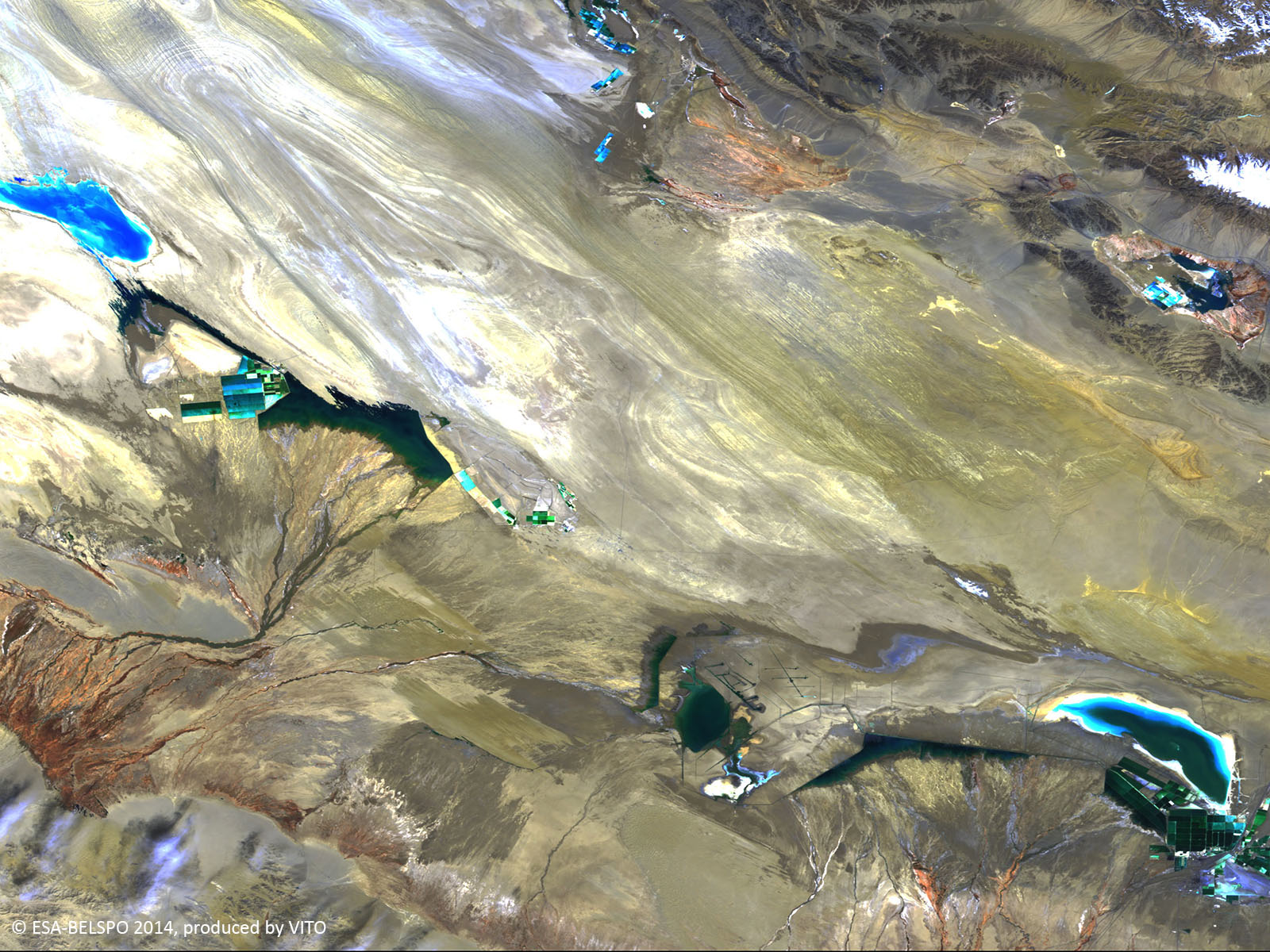
The Sanhu Depression in SE Qaidam (2014). The two Taijinar lakes lie to the northwest and the lakes of the Qarhan Playa to the southeast. (ESA)

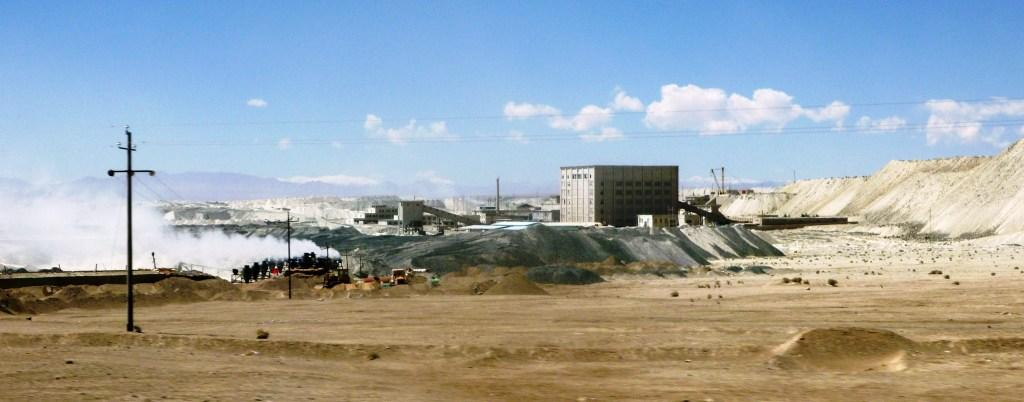
A salt mine in the Qaidam Desert

The basin's large mineral deposits caused a great deal of investment interest from 2005. Qarhan Playa, a salt flat including about ten of the lakes, contains over 50 billion metric tons (55 billion short tons) of salt.

Beneath the salt, Qaidam is one of China's nine most important petroliferous basins and its largest center of onshore production. The Qinghai Oilfield, exploited since 1954, includes the Lenghu, Gasikule, Yuejin-2, and Huatugou oil fields and the Sebei-1, Sebei-2, and Tainan gas fields. All together, it has proven reserves of 347.65 million metric tons (more than 2 billion barrels) of petroleum and 306.6 billion cubic meters (10.83 trillion cubic feet) of natural gas. Annual production capacity is about 2 million metric tons of petroleum and 8.5 billion cubic meters of natural gas. A pipeline connects the Huatugou field with a major refinery at Golmud, and the Sebei gas fields are connected to Xining, Lanzhou, and Yinchuan.

Qaidam has reserves of asbestos, borax, gypsum, and several metals, with the greatest reserves of lithium, magnesium, potassium, and sodium found anywhere in China.

== Transportation ==
The Xining-Golmud rail line (the first stage of the Qinghai–Tibet Railway), which crossed the eastern part of the Qaidam Basin in the early 1980s, is an essential transportation link for accessing the region's mineral resources. Additional railroads spanning the basin include the Golmud–Dunhuang Railway completed in December 2019 and a 25 km private railway constructed by Zangge Mining Co., Ltd.

The National Development and Reform Commission began conducting preliminary planning for the Golmud-Korla Railway in September 2013, which would stretch across the western portion of the Qaidam Basin. Construction began in November 2014 and concluded in 2020.
