= Wenquan, Golmud =

Settlement in Qinghai, China

Wenquan (Chinese: 温泉; pinyin: Wēnquán; Wade–Giles: Wen-ch'üan, i.e. "Warm Springs") is a small settlement in the Qinghai province of China. Administratively, it is part of Tanggula Town, which is an exclave of Golmud County-level city, Haixi Mongol and Tibetan Autonomous Prefecture.

Originally constructed in 1955, Wenquan is one of the small settlements serving China National Highway 109 (the main road into Tibet), and, later, the Qinghai-Tibet Railway.

== Geography ==
The settlement is located in the area where the highway and the railway cross the Tanggula Mountains, the mountain range in the center of the Qinghai-Tibet Plateau. It is located a few tens of kilometers north of the Tanggula Pass, where the road and the railway enter from Qinghai Province into the Tibetan Autonomous Region. It is one of the highest settlements in the world with residences up to 4,870 metres (15,980 ft) above sea level.

Although not really a "city" by any definition, Wenquan is listed in the Guinness Book of World Records (misspelled as "Wenzhuan") as the world's highest city, with an incorrect elevation of 16,730 feet (5,100 m) above sea level. Travel books also inflate the size and elevation of this settlement. However, National Geographic Magazine (May 2003) gives the highest city distinction to La Rinconada, Peru, which has a much higher population and lies at 5,100 metres (16,700 ft) above sea level.

Some 20–30 km to the north of Wenquan, in the same highway/railway corridor, detailed maps (e.g., 33°26′30″N 91°56′00″E on Google Maps) show Wenquan Military Station (温泉兵站).

According to bicycle tourists who visited the place in 2000, Wenquan, like other settlements in the region, was "small. Just a few buildings." There were indeed warm springs in the area. They described the location, based on their maps, as being "at 4,800+ metres" elevation, an elevation confirmed (at 4,850 to 4,870 meters) by SRTM data.

== Climate ==
Wenquan has a tundra climate (Köppen classification ET) bordering very closely on a subarctic climate (Köppen classification Dfc). It has cool summers with some precipitation and cold, dry winters. The yearly precipitation is 246 millimetres (9.7 in), which means Wenquan is technically in a desert. Due to its high elevation, there is high diurnal temperature variation.

Climate data for Wenquan
Month	Jan	Feb	Mar	Apr	May	Jun	Jul	Aug	Sep	Oct	Nov	Dec	Year
Mean daily maximum °C (°F)	0.2 (32.4)	1.5 (34.7)	4.0 (39.2)	7.9 (46.2)	12.0 (53.6)	16.3 (61.3)	15.5 (59.9)	14.5 (58.1)	13.3 (55.9)	8.9 (48.0)	4.6 (40.3)	2.1 (35.8)	8.4 (47.1)
Daily mean °C (°F)	−9.6 (14.7)	−7.8 (18.0)	−4.5 (23.9)	−0.1 (31.8)	4.2 (39.6)	8.9 (48.0)	9.7 (49.5)	9.0 (48.2)	6.9 (44.4)	0.9 (33.6)	−4.7 (23.5)	−7.9 (17.8)	0.4 (32.8)
Mean daily minimum °C (°F)	−19.4 (−2.9)	−17.0 (1.4)	−13.0 (8.6)	−8.0 (17.6)	−3.6 (25.5)	1.6 (34.9)	4.0 (39.2)	3.6 (38.5)	0.5 (32.9)	−7.1 (19.2)	−13.9 (7.0)	−17.9 (−0.2)	−7.5 (18.5)
Average precipitation mm (inches)	1 (0.0)	1 (0.0)	2 (0.1)	3 (0.1)	5 (0.2)	24 (0.9)	78 (3.1)	95 (3.7)	28 (1.1)	7 (0.3)	1 (0.0)	1 (0.0)	246 (9.5)

== See also ==
- List of towns and villages in Tibet
- List of highest cities in the world
- List of highest towns by country
- La Rinconada, Peru
- Tuiwa
