= List of highest settlements =

This article provides a incomplete list of the world's highest settlements built and permanently occupied by human populations all year long. Only those settlements that are situated at least partially at an altitude of 3,500 metres (11,500 ft) or higher above sea level are included in the ranking.

== Settlements at or above 4,500 metres (14,800 ft) ==
Elevation	Name	Country	Comments
5,100 metres (16,700 ft)	La Rinconada (San Antonio de Putina)	Peru	The highest in the world according to National Geographic Magazine in May 2003 when it had 30,000 inhabitants, rising to 50,000 inhabitants in 2012 but shrinking to 29,746 inhabitants as of the 2017 census. It is 5,052 m (16,575 ft) above sea level according to the INEI in Peru.
5,070 metres (16,630 ft)	Tuiwa (Tibet)	China	
5,011 metres (16,440 ft)	Chasangcun (Tibet)	China	
4,980 metres (16,340 ft)	Rongbuk Monastery (Tibet)	China	
4,950 metres (16,240 ft)	Shuanghu (Tibet)	China	
4,940 metres (16,210 ft)	Lobuche (Koshi)	Nepal	Lobuche or Lobuje is a small settlement near Mount Everest in the Khumbu region of Nepal. It is one of the last overnight stops with lodging on the way to Everest Base camp.
4,870 metres (15,980 ft)	Wenquan, Golmud (Qinghai)	China	This small settlement is the highest "city" in the world according to The Guinness Book of World Records. Highest in the Eastern and Northern Hemisphere.
4,770 metres (15,650 ft)	Santa Bárbara, Potosí (Sud Chichas)	Bolivia	Miners' village
4,735 metres (15,535 ft)	Lungring (Tibet)	China	31°07′30″N 91°42′17″E
4,720 metres (15,490 ft)	Yanshiping (Qinghai/Tibet)	China	Population 2,919 (2017).
4,710 metres (15,450 ft)	Amdo (Tibet)	China	Population 3,327 (2017).
4,700 metres (15,400 ft)	Phinaya (Cusco)	Peru	Population 339
4,695 metres (15,404 ft)	Domar (Tibet)	China	Population 1,488
4,660 metres (15,290 ft)	Condoroma (Cusco)	Peru	Population 533
4,660 metres (15,290 ft)	Ananea (Puno)	Peru	Population 1,729
4,570 metres (14,990 ft)	Karzok (Ladakh)	India	Population 1,291 (2011).
4,587 metres (15,049 ft)	Komic (Himachal Pradesh)	India	Population 114
4,500 metres (14,800 ft)	Hanle (Ladakh)	India	
4,500 metres (14,800 ft)	Nagqu (Tibet)	China	Population 42,984 (2010).

== Settlements below 4,500 metres (14,800 ft) ==
Elevation	Name	Country	Comment
4,470 metres (14,670 ft)	Quzong Village	China	Population: 276
4,410 metres (14,470 ft)	Dingboche	Nepal	
4,400 metres (14,400 ft)	Parinacota	Chile	Small Chilean hamlet in Putre, Parinacota Province, Arica and Parinacota Region and had 29 inhabitants in 2002.
4,350 metres (14,270 ft)	Cojata	Peru	
4,350 metres (14,270 ft)	Chharka, Dolpa	Nepal	Ancient Buddhist village in Dolpa region.
4,338 metres (14,232 ft)	Cerro de Pasco	Peru	Mining town with a population of 66,860 (2007).
4,340 metres (14,240 ft)	Mina Pirquitas	Argentina	Mining company town and municipality in Jujuy Province, and the highest settlement in Argentina.
4,349 metres (14,268 ft)	Achirik, Ladakh	India	
4,315 metres (14,157 ft)	Macusani	Peru	
4,310 metres (14,140 ft)	Hankar, Ladakh	India	
4,300 metres (14,100 ft)	Pagri, Tibet	China	Town in Yadong County in the Tibet Autonomous Region (Xizang Zizhiqu), China, near the border with Bhutan. Population 2,121 (2004).
4,279 metres (14,039 ft)	Ating, Ladakh	India	
4,272 metres (14,016 ft)	Khuldo, Ladakh	India	
4,270 metres (14,010 ft)	Kibber, Himachal Pradesh	India	
4,226 metres (13,865 ft)	Demchok, Ladakh / Dêmqog, Tibet	India / China	Hamlet between Ladakh of India and Tibet Autonomous Region of China. The combined Chinese-Indian village has a population of about 150.
4,200 metres (13,800 ft)	Ngari (Shiquanhe), Tibet	China	Population 10,282 (2010).
4,170 metres (13,680 ft)	Colquechaca	Bolivia	Small town in Bolivia. Population 4,272 (2012). It is the highest city in Bolivia.
4,100 metres (13,500 ft)	Jama	Argentina	Border post and settlement in Jujuy Province in Argentina.
4,150 metres (13,620 ft)	El Alto	Bolivia	Population 846,880 (2012). It is part of La Paz agglomeration and contains La Paz's El Alto International Airport.
4,105 metres (13,468 ft)	Junín	Peru	
4,100 metres (13,500 ft)	Durbuk, Ladakh	India	Village in the territory of Ladakh that has a recorded population of 300 people, though the actual figure may be higher.
4,105 metres (13,468 ft)	Ampultun, Ladakh	India	
4,090 metres (13,420 ft)	Potosí	Bolivia	Population 176,022 (2012). City and the capital of the department of Potosí in Bolivia.
4,100 metres (13,500 ft)	Nyoma, Ladakh	India	
4,014 metres (13,169 ft)	Gaocheng, Sichuan	China	
4,013 metres (13,166 ft)	Chatyndy	Kyrgyzstan	
3,980 metres (13,060 ft)	El Aguilar	Argentina	El Aguilar is a mining company town in Jujuy Province. 3,655 inhabitants (2001)
3,970 metres (13,020 ft)	Huanuni	Bolivia	Population 20,336 (2012).
3,963 metres (13,002 ft)	Dolpa, Karnali Zone	Nepal	
3,956 metres (12,979 ft)	Castrovirreyna	Peru	
3,950 metres (12,960 ft)	Catua	Argentina	Rural municipality and village in Jujuy Province in Argentina.
3,940 metres (12,930 ft)	Coranzuli	Argentina	Rural municipality and village in Jujuy Province in Argentina.
3,924 metres (12,874 ft)	Yauri	Peru	Population 24,566 (2007).
3,907 metres (12,818 ft)	Ayaviri	Peru	Population 18,881 (2007).
3,895 metres (12,779 ft)	Llallagua	Bolivia	Population 25,166 (2012).
3,892 metres (12,769 ft)	Lampa	Peru	
3,878 metres (12,723 ft)	Putina	Peru	Population 14,318 (2007).
3,871 metres (12,700 ft)	Viacha	Bolivia	Population 62,516 (2012).
3,862 metres (12,671 ft)	Ilave	Peru	Population 22,153 (2007).
3,851 metres (12,635 ft)	Rinconada	Argentina	
3,869 metres (12,694 ft)	Juli	Peru	
3,859 metres (12,661 ft)	Azángaro	Peru	Population 16,035 (2007).
3,850 metres (12,630 ft)	Laya	Bhutan	
3,850 metres (12,630 ft)	Tiwanaku	Bolivia	Population 860 (2013)
3,847 metres (12,621 ft)	Yunguyo	Peru	Population 11,934 (2007).
3,847 metres (12,621 ft)	Huarina	Bolivia	
3,836 metres (12,585 ft)	Shigatse, Tibet	China	Population 63,967 (2010).
3,825 metres (12,549 ft)	Huancané	Peru	
3,824 metres (12,546 ft)	Juliaca	Peru	Population 216,716 (2007).
3,819 metres (12,530 ft)	Puno	Peru	Population 120,229 (2007).
3,809 metres (12,497 ft)	Desaguadero	Peru	Population 14,365 (2007).
3,775 metres (12,385 ft)	San Antonio de los Cobres	Argentina	Population 5,482 (2001 census).
3,760 metres (12,340 ft)	Olacapato	Argentina	
3,745 metres (12,287 ft)	La Oroya	Peru	Population 29,417 (2007).
3,706 metres (12,159 ft)	Oruro	Bolivia	Population 264,943 (2012).
3,700 metres (12,100 ft)	Gyêgu, Qinghai	China	
3,678 metres (12,067 ft)	Santo Tomás	Peru	
3,676 metres (12,060 ft)	Huancavelica	Peru	Population 41,331 (2007).
3,660 metres (12,010 ft)	Uyuni	Bolivia	Population 18,068 (2012).
3,658 metres (12,001 ft)	Lhasa, Tibet	China	Population 216,663 (2010). The capital city of Tibet.
3,650 metres (11,980 ft)	La Paz	Bolivia	Population 758,845 (2012) Bolivian seat of government; the highest capital city in the world.
3,618 metres (11,870 ft)	Murghob	Tajikistan	Population 7,468 (2015)
3,548 metres (11,640 ft)	Sicuani	Peru	Population 42,551 (2007).

== See also ==
- List of highest towns by country
- List of capital cities by altitude
- List of highest large cities in the world
