= Rinconada (disambiguation) =

Rinconada may refer to:

== Places ==
- Rinconada, a city and commune in the Los Andes Province of central Valparaíso Region, Chile.
- Rinconada Department, a department in the province of Jujuy in the Argentina.
- Rinconada, Jujuy, a municipality in Jujuy Province in Argentina.
- Rinconada Llicuar District, a district of the province Sechura in Peru.
- Casa Rinconada, a Chacoan Anasazi archaeological site located in Chaco Culture National Historical Park, northwestern New Mexico, United States.

== Other uses ==
- Rinconada Bikol language, a language of the Philippines

== See also ==
- La Rinconada (disambiguation)
