= Wang Jianfeng =

Chinese politician

- 王剑锋

Communist Party Secretary of Haixi Mongol and Tibetan Autonomous Prefecture
- In office April 2021 – August 2021
- Preceded by: Yin Bai
- Succeeded by: Wang Dingbang

Personal details
- Born: April 1970 (age 56) Longkou, Shandong, China
- Party: Chinese Communist Party
- Education: Northwestern Polytechnical University

Chinese name
- Simplified Chinese: 王剑锋
- Traditional Chinese: 王劍鋒
Transcriptions
Standard Mandarin
- Hanyu Pinyin: Wáng Jiànfēng

Wang Jianfeng (Chinese: 王剑锋; born April 1970) is a former Chinese politician who spent his entire career in northwest China's Qinghai province. As of September 2021, he was under investigation by China's top anti-corruption agency. Previously, he served as party secretary of Haixi Mongol and Tibetan Autonomous Prefecture.

== Biography ==
Born in Longkou, Shandong, in April 1970, Wang graduated from Northwestern Polytechnical University.

He entered the workforce in April 1989, and joined the Chinese Communist Party (CCP) in June 1993. Wang started his politic career in Chengzhong District of Xining, capital of Qinghai province. He served in the General Office of Xining Municipal Government for eight years, ultimately being appointed director in April 2003. He became governor of Chengbei District, in January 2008, and then party secretary, the top political position in the district, beginning in July 2001. He was appointed vice mayor of Xining in August 2014 and four years later was admitted to member of the Chinese Communist Party Provincial Standing Committee of Xining, the city's top authority. In July 2020, he became the deputy party secretary of Haixi Mongol and Tibetan Autonomous Prefecture, rising to party secretary the next year. He also served as party secretary of Golmud from July 2020 to April 2021. He concurrently served as party secretary of Qaidam Circular Economy Experimental Zone, one of the first thirteen pilot parks of circular economy industry in China.

=== Downfall ===
On 10 September 2021, he has been placed under investigation for "serious violations of laws and regulations" by the Central Commission for Discipline Inspection (CCDI), the party's internal disciplinary body, and the National Supervisory Commission, the highest anti-corruption agency of China. His predecessor Wen Guodong surrendered himself to the anti-corruption agency of China in September 2020.

Party political offices
Preceded by Yin Bai	Communist Party Secretary of Haixi Mongol and Tibetan Autonomous Prefecture; 2021–2021	Succeeded by Wang Dingbang
