= Tundra climate =

Polar climate sub-type

Location of tundra climate in the world

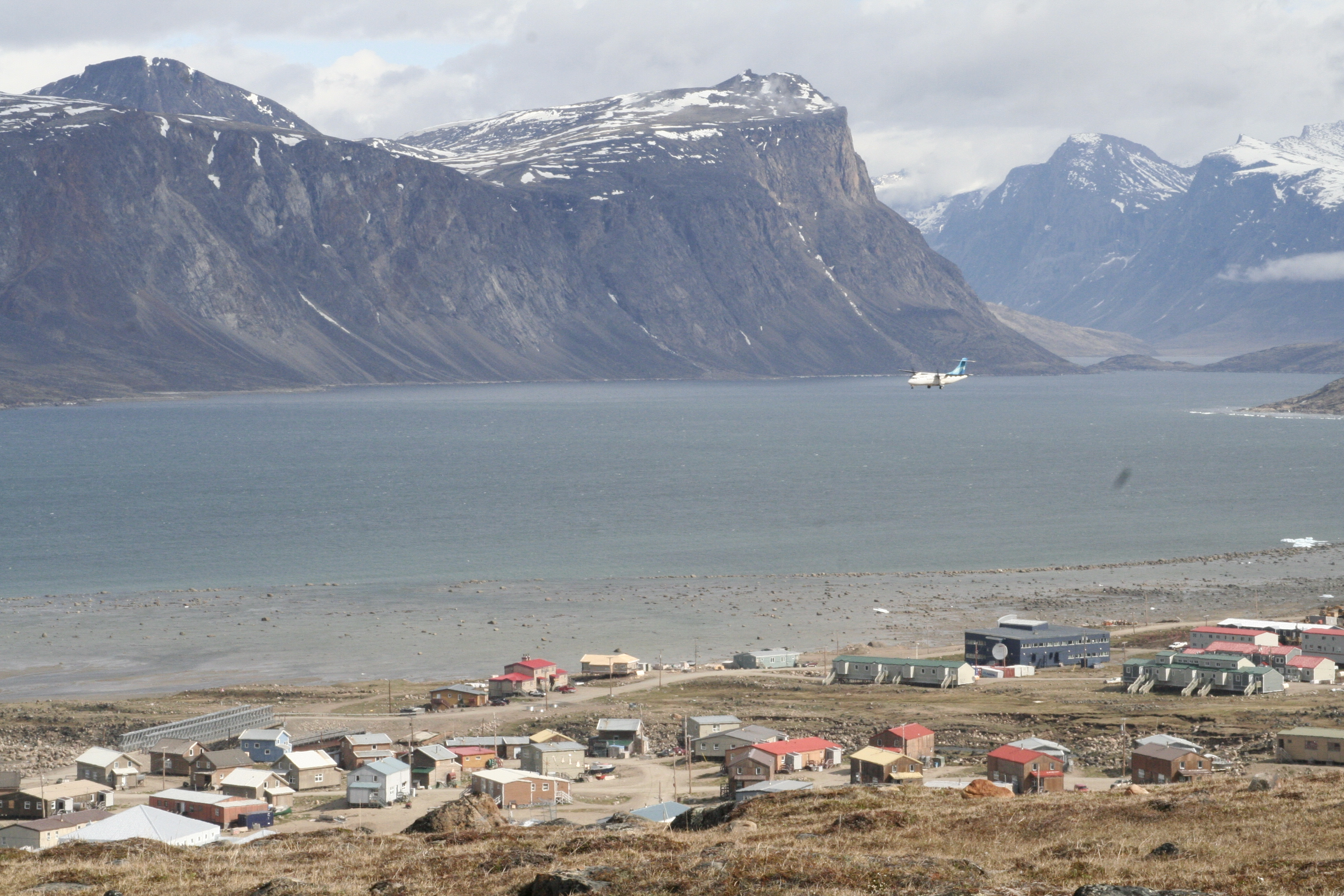
Pangnirtung, Baffin Island, has a tundra climate

The tundra climate is a polar climate sub-type located in high latitudes and high mountains. It is classified as ET according to the Köppen climate classification. It is a climate which at least one month has an average temperature high enough to melt snow 0 °C (32 °F), but no month with an average temperature in excess of 10 °C (50 °F). If the climate occurs at high elevations, it is known as alpine climate.

Despite the potential diversity of climates in the ET category involving precipitation, extreme temperatures, and relative wet and dry seasons, this category is rarely subdivided. Rainfall and snowfall are generally slight due to the low vapor pressure of water in the chilly atmosphere, but as a rule potential evapotranspiration is extremely low, allowing soggy terrain of swamps and bogs even in places that get precipitation typical of deserts of lower and middle latitudes. The amount of native tundra biomass depends more on the local temperature than the amount of precipitation.

Tundra climates are the second coldest Köppen climate type on Earth, though extreme subarctic climates (Dfd/Dwd/Dsd) can experience significantly colder winters. There is also an oceanic variety of the tundra climate with cool to mild winters (the coldest month averaging around 0°C) which borders the subpolar oceanic climate (Cfc) and is found in parts of Iceland, the Aleutian Islands and most predominantly on subantarctic islands.

== Climate charts ==
Nuuk, Greenland, Danish Realm

Climate chart (precipitation, max. and min. temperature)
J	F	M	A	M	J	J	A	S	O	N	D
67 −5 −10	51 −6 −11	59 −5 −10	53 −1 −5	57 4 −1	62 8 2	69 11 4	91 10 5	105 7 2	81 2 −2	79 −1 −5	75 −3 −8
- █ Average max. and min. temperatures in °C
- █ Precipitation totals in mm
- Source: Danish Meteorological Institute
Imperial conversion
J	F	M	A	M	J	J	A	S	O	N	D
2.6 23 15	2 21 12	2.3 23 14	2.1 31 23	2.3 39 30	2.4 47 36	2.7 52 40	3.6 50 40	4.1 44 36	3.2 36 29	3.1 30 22	2.9 26 18
- █ Average max. and min. temperatures in °F
- █ Precipitation totals in inches

Utqiagvik, Alaska, United States

Climate chart (precipitation, max. and min. temperature)
J	F	M	A	M	J	J	A	S	O	N	D
3.6 −21 −28	5.3 −21 −28	4.6 −20 −27	4.6 −12 −19	7.1 −3 −8	11 5 −1	25 9 2	28 7 2	20 3 −1	14 −4 −8	9.4 −11 −18	5.6 −18 −25
- █ Average max. and min. temperatures in °C
- █ Precipitation totals in mm
- Source: NOAA
Imperial conversion
J	F	M	A	M	J	J	A	S	O	N	D
0.1 −5 −18	0.2 −5 −18	0.2 −4 −17	0.2 11 −3	0.3 27 19	0.4 41 31	1 48 36	1.1 44 35	0.8 37 30	0.6 26 17	0.4 11 0	0.2 0 −12
- █ Average max. and min. temperatures in °F
- █ Precipitation totals in inches

Longyearbyen, Svalbard, Norway

Climate chart (precipitation, max. and min. temperature)
J	F	M	A	M	J	J	A	S	O	N	D
21 −8 −14	17 −8 −15	16 −9 −16	9 −6 −12	8 −1 −4	8 6 2	20 9 5	23 8 4	26 4 0	18 −2 −6	22 −4 −9	24 −6 −12
- █ Average max. and min. temperatures in °C
- █ Precipitation totals in mm
- Source: Norwegian Meteorological Institute
Imperial conversion
J	F	M	A	M	J	J	A	S	O	N	D
0.8 18 6	0.7 17 5	0.6 16 4	0.4 22 10	0.3 31 25	0.3 42 36	0.8 49 42	0.9 47 40	1 39 33	0.7 29 21	0.9 25 15	0.9 21 10
- █ Average max. and min. temperatures in °F
- █ Precipitation totals in inches

Tiksi, Sakha Republic, Russia

Climate chart (precipitation, max. and min. temperature)
J	F	M	A	M	J	J	A	S	O	N	D
22 −26 −33	15 −27 −34	10 −21 −30	8 −12 −22	15 −2 −9	28 8 1	45 13 5	48 12 5	27 5 −1	15 −7 −13	19 −19 −26	21 −25 −32
- █ Average max. and min. temperatures in °C
- █ Precipitation totals in mm
- Source: погода и климат
Imperial conversion
J	F	M	A	M	J	J	A	S	O	N	D
0.9 −15 −28	0.6 −16 −29	0.4 −6 −22	0.3 10 −8	0.6 28 16	1.1 46 33	1.8 55 40	1.9 53 41	1.1 41 31	0.6 19 8	0.7 −2 −14	0.8 −12 −25
- █ Average max. and min. temperatures in °F
- █ Precipitation totals in inches

Tolhuin, Tierra del Fuego, Argentina

Climate chart (precipitation, max. and min. temperature)
J	F	M	A	M	J	J	A	S	O	N	D
64 14 5	46 14 4	54 12 2	52 9 0	52 5 −2	50 3 −5	42 3 −5	41 4 −3	38 7 −1	36 10 0	41 12 2	60 13 4
- █ Average max. and min. temperatures in °C
- █ Precipitation totals in mm
- Source: Servicio Meteorológico Nacional
Imperial conversion
J	F	M	A	M	J	J	A	S	O	N	D
2.5 57 40	1.8 57 39	2.1 54 36	2 48 33	2 42 28	2 37 24	1.6 37 23	1.6 40 27	1.5 44 29	1.4 50 33	1.6 53 36	2.4 56 38
- █ Average max. and min. temperatures in °F
- █ Precipitation totals in inches

Macquarie Island, Tasmania, Australia

Climate chart (precipitation, max. and min. temperature)
J	F	M	A	M	J	J	A	S	O	N	D
89 9 5	86 9 5	101 8 5	94 7 4	87 6 3	79 5 2	75 5 2	77 5 2	77 5 2	78 6 2	74 7 3	81 8 4
- █ Average max. and min. temperatures in °C
- █ Precipitation totals in mm
- Source: Australian Bureau of Meteorology
Imperial conversion
J	F	M	A	M	J	J	A	S	O	N	D
3.5 48 42	3.4 48 42	4 46 40	3.7 45 39	3.4 43 37	3.1 41 35	2.9 41 35	3 41 35	3 42 35	3.1 42 36	2.9 44 37	3.2 46 40
- █ Average max. and min. temperatures in °F
- █ Precipitation totals in inches

=== Places featuring a tundra climate ===
Alpine tundra

- Apartaderos, Venezuela
- Ben Nevis, Scotland, United Kingdom
- Cairn Gorm, United Kingdom
- Cerro de Pasco, Peru
- Coranzuli, Argentina
- Dingboche, Nepal
- Finse, Norway
- Gavia Pass, Italy
- High Tatras, Slovakia
- Juf, Switzerland
- Kasprowy Wierch, Poland
- La Rinconada, Peru
- Mauna Loa, Hawaii, United States
- Mount Apo, Philippines
- Mount Aragats (slopes), Armenia
- Mount Fuji, Japan
- Mount Rainier (slopes), Washington, United States
- Mount Washington, New Hampshire, United States
- Mount Wellington, Australia
- Murghob, Tajikistan
- Musala, Bulgaria
- Nevado de Toluca, Mexico
- Phari, China
- Puno, Peru
- Putre, Chile
- Sêrxü, China
- Sněžka, Czechia
- Tanggulashan, Qinghai, China
- Trepalle, Italy
- Vârful Omu, Romania
- Vetas, Colombia
- Yu Shan, Taiwan
- Zugspitze, Bavaria, Germany

Polar tundra

- Alert, Nunavut, Canada
- Campbell Island, New Zealand
- Crozet Islands
- Dikson Island, Russia
- Esperanza Base, Antarctica
- Grytviken, South Georgia (United Kingdom)
- Hooper Bay, United States
- Hveravellir, Iceland
- Iqaluit, Nunavut, Canada
- Jan Mayen, Norway
- Kerguelen Islands, French Southern Lands (France)
- Longyearbyen, Svalbard, Norway
- Macquarie Island, Australia
- Mykines, Faroe Islands (Denmark)
- Novaya Zemyla, Arkhangelsk Oblast, Russia
- Nuuk, Greenland (Denmark)
- Provideniya, Russia ETs (dry summer)
- Puerto Williams, Chile
- Tiksi, Sakha Republic, Russia
- Tolhuin, Argentina
- Ushuaia, Argentina
- Utqiagvik, Alaska, United States
- Yamal Peninsula, Russia
- Wainwright, Alaska can be classified ETw (dry winter)

== See also ==
- Polar climate
- Alpine tundra
