= Rinconada Department =

Coordinates: 22°26′25″S 66°9′59″W

Rinconada Department Departamento Rinconada
- Department
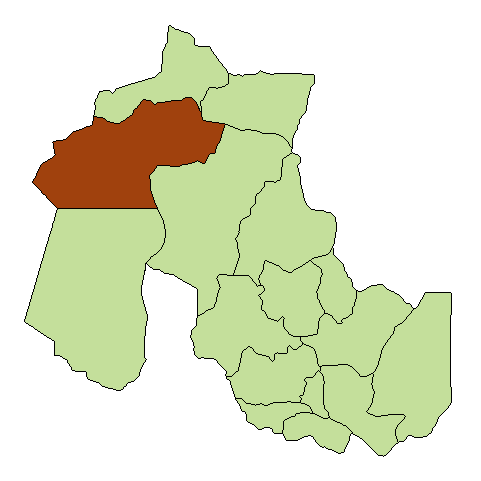
- Location of Rinconada Department in Jujuy Province
- Country: Argentina
- Province: Jujuy
- Capital: Rinconada

Area
  - Total: 6,407 km^{2} (2,474 sq mi)

Population (2022 census [INDEC])
  - Total: 1,802
  - Density: 0.2813/km^{2} (0.7284/sq mi)
- Time zone: ART

Rinconada is a department in the province of Jujuy in the Argentina. According to INDEC its population in 2010 was 2,489 inhabitants. Its main town is Rinconada. The town of Mina Pirquitas represents the highest point in Argentina, standing at 4,271 m above sea level.

== Towns ==
- Rinconada
- Lagunillas del Farallón
- Nuevo Pirquitas
- Liviara
- Santa Ana (Rinconada)
- Mina Pirquitas (the highest point)

== Settlements ==
- Antiguyo
- Barrealito
- Bravo Grande (Salta)
- Carahuasi
- Casa Colorada
- Ciénaga Grande
- Icacha
- Lagunillas
- Loma Blanca
- Mina Ajedrez (Farillón)
- Mina Pan de Azúcar
- Nazareno
- Orosmayo
- Peñas Blancas
- Pirquitas
- Portezuelo
- Rosario de Susques (Rosario)
- Rosario de Coyahuaima
- Ramallo
- San José
- Tiomayo

== Seismicity ==
The seismicity of the area of Jujuy is frequent and low intensity, and mean to severe seismic silence every 40 years.

- 1863 earthquake: This earthquake on January 4, 1863, measuring 6.4 on the Richter scale, indicated an important milestone in the history of seismic events in Jujuy. It highlighted the need to impose stricter construction codes.
- 1948 earthquake: The August 25, 1848, measuring 7.0 on the Richter scale, destroyed buildings and opened numerous cracks in wide areas.
- 2009 earthquake: November 6, 2009, measuring 5.6 on the Richter scale.
