= Geladaindong Peak =

Mountain in Qinghai, China

Geladaindong
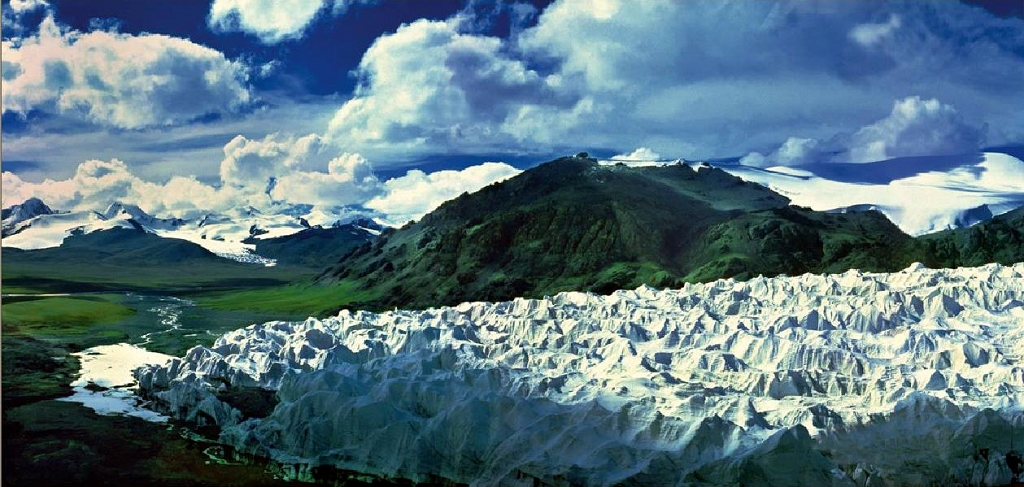
- The glaciers of the Tanggula Mountains, the traditional source of the Yangtze River

Highest point
- Elevation: 6,621 m (21,722 ft)
- Prominence: 1,541 m (5,056 ft)
- Listing: Ultra
- Coordinates: 33°29′45″N 91°10′03″E

Geography
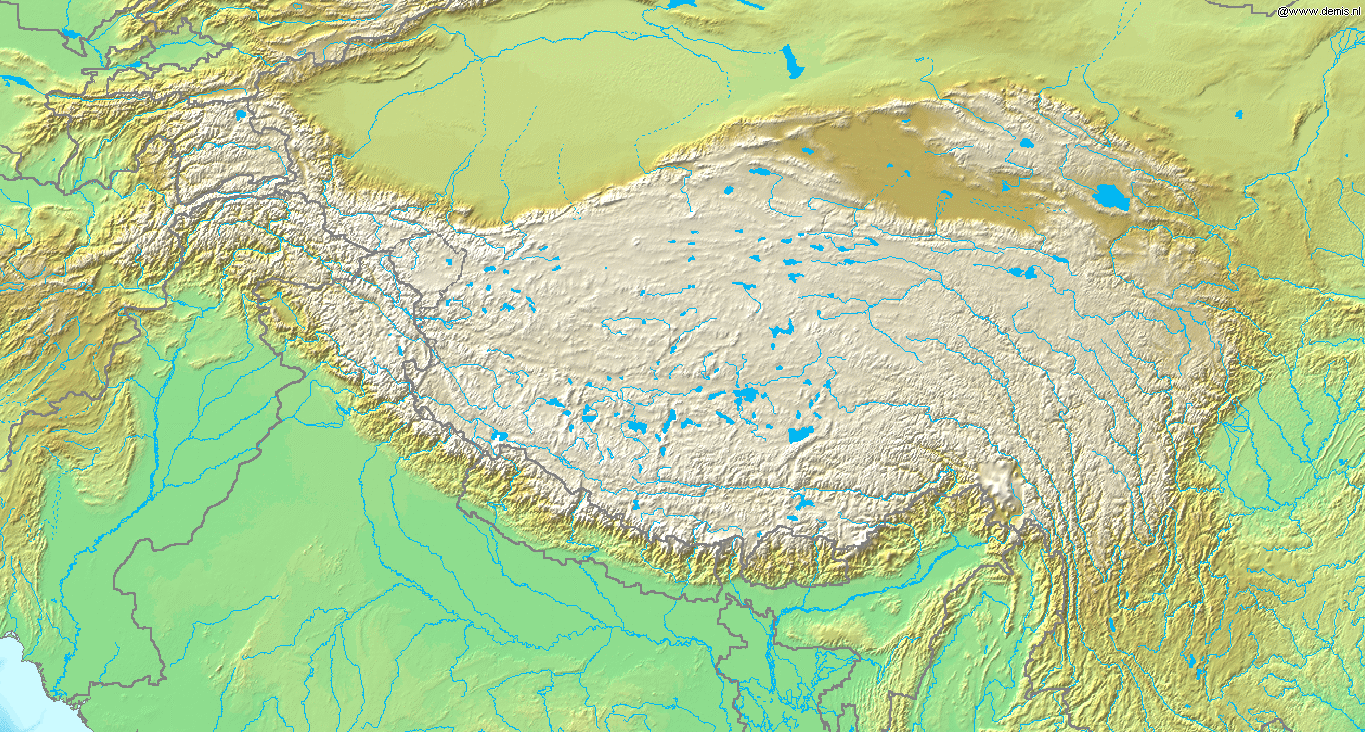
- Location within Tibetan Plateau
- Location: Qinghai, China
- Parent range: Tanggula

Climbing
- First ascent: 1985 by a Japanese team

Geladaindong Peak (also spelled Geladandong, Geladaintong or Kolha Dardong) is a snow-covered mountain (or massif) located in Southwestern Qinghai Province of China near the border of Tibet Autonomous Region. It is the tallest mountain in the Tanggula Mountain Range of the Tibetan Plateau with an elevation of 6,621 metres (21,722 ft) above sea level. The traditional source of the Yangtze River, begins with glaciers on its surface. The Yangtze's longest source, however, lies 365 km (227 mi) away at the head of the Dam Qu River.

The mountain's name is Geladaindong in the Tibetan language. The name in Chinese is 各拉丹冬 (Pinyin: Gèlādāndōng) or 各拉丹冬峰 (Pinyin: Gèlādāndōng Fēng, literally "Geladandong Peak").

== Location ==
Geladaindong is located in the administrative unit known as Tanggula Town: an exclave of Haixi Prefecture, in the middle section of Tanggula Shan (the Tanggula Mountain Range).

The Geladaindong Peak is encircled by over twenty high peaks exceeding 6,000 meters (19,685 ft) in height. It is approximately 50 km (31 mi) long from north to south and approximately 20 km (12 mi) wide from west to east, covering an area of approximately 670 square kilometres (260 sq mi) with ice and snow, covered by over 40 glaciers. This area is directly across the border from Amdo County, Nagqu Prefecture, Tibet Autonomous Region.

The Qinghai-Tibet Railway crosses the Tanggula Mountain Range around 100 km (62 mi) to the east of Geladaindong Peak.

== Climate ==
Due to the area's arid climate, its annual precipitation is only 200 mm (7.9 in). In the high-altitude area of over 5,000 meters (16,404 ft), however, there exists violent local air circulation and its yearly precipitation is several hundred mm more than that in the foothill area. Thus, snow and hailstones frequently fall, presenting conditions for the development of glaciers. The average temperature is −5 °C (23 °F), and the hottest months are from June to August with a temperature of over 20 °C (68 °F), while the coldest month is January, with a temperature of −18 °C (−0.4 °F). In the high-altitude area of over 5,000 m (16,404 ft), it remains cold all year round, the lowest temperature being less than −30 °C (−22 °F).

== Wildlife ==
The mountain serves as a shelter for more than twenty kinds of wild animals, including the white-lipped deer, Asiatic wild ass, snow leopard, and alpine snowcock.

== Climbing ==
Geladaindong was first climbed by Japanese team in 1985 after three years of trying to obtain a permit. They ascended the peak via the northwest ridge approaching from the northeast.

In 1997 an American team climbed a new route up the northeast face (55–60°). The team consisted of William N. Rom M.D., Dan Luchtel PhD, and Mark Newcomb. Mark Newcomb also pioneered a face solo route on the same expedition.

Although a dangerous peak to climb, Geladaindong is popular among Chinese mountain climbers. In 1994, the Mountaineering Association of Peking University (MAPKU) became the first Chinese climbing team to reach the summit of Geladaindong.

== See also ==
- List of ultras of Tibet, East Asia and neighbouring areas
