= Tuotuohe railway station =

Railway station in China

Coordinates: 34°13′59.33″N 92°26′44.72″E

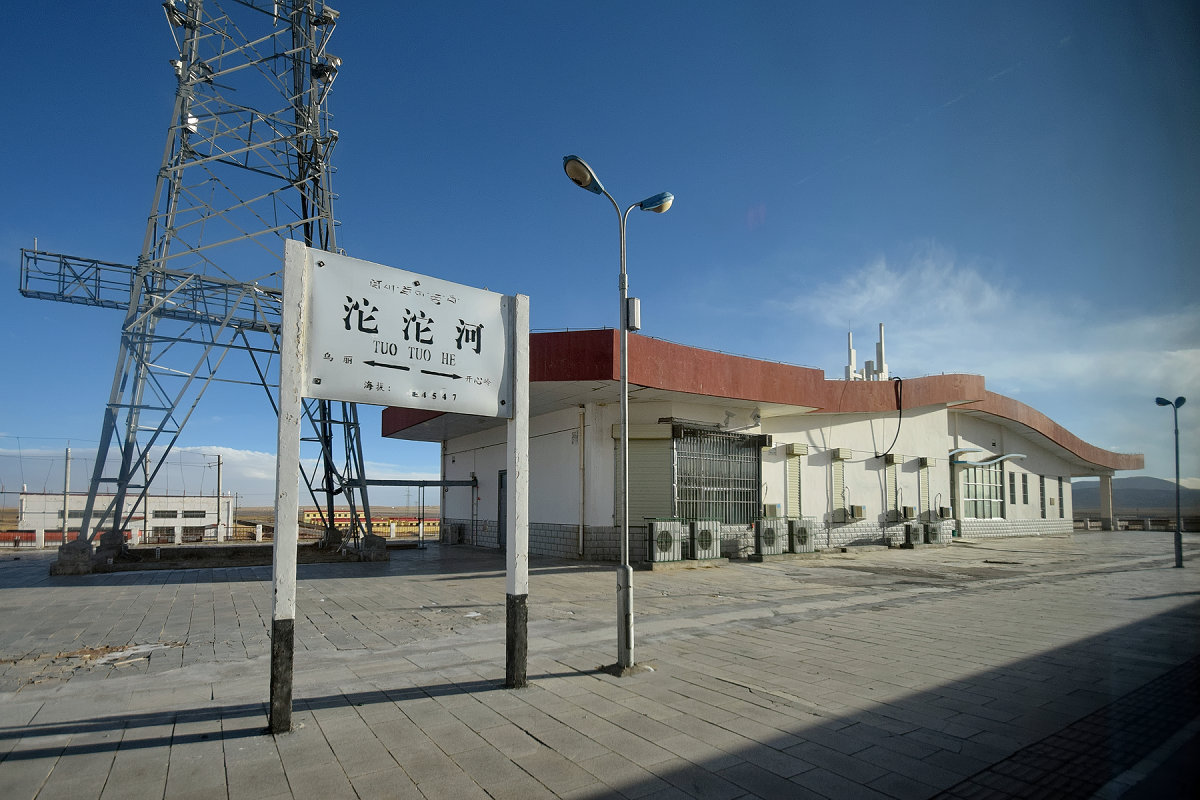

The Tuotuohe railway station (Chinese: 沱沱河站; pinyin: Tuótuóhé Zhàn) also known as the Togtogquwo railway station (Tibetan: ཐོག་ཐོག་ཆུ་བོའི་འབབ་ཚུགས་, ZWPY: Togtogquwoi Babcug) is a station on the Chinese Qinghai–Tibet Railway. It is located near the railway bridge over the Tuotuo River (沱沱河, Tuótuóhé), which is considered the headwaters of China's great Yangtze River. Further downstream, it is known in China as the Tongtian River, Jinsha River, and finally the Changjiang.

Although both the river (Tuotuohe) and the seat of Tanggulashan Town (Tuotuoheyan) are known in Tibetan as Mar Qu, the official Tibetan name of this railway station is Togtogquwo.

The station is located next to the main urban area, such as there is, of Tanggula Town.

== Climate ==
Climate data for Tuotuohe, elevation 4,533 m (14,872 ft), (1991–2020 normals, extremes 1981–2010)
Month	Jan	Feb	Mar	Apr	May	Jun	Jul	Aug	Sep	Oct	Nov	Dec	Year
Record high °C (°F)	6.7 (44.1)	6.7 (44.1)	12.0 (53.6)	16.2 (61.2)	21.8 (71.2)	24.7 (76.5)	23.0 (73.4)	22.3 (72.1)	19.4 (66.9)	16.6 (61.9)	7.9 (46.2)	6.0 (42.8)	24.7 (76.5)
Mean daily maximum °C (°F)	−6.0 (21.2)	−3.3 (26.1)	0.9 (33.6)	5.4 (41.7)	9.5 (49.1)	12.7 (54.9)	15.1 (59.2)	14.8 (58.6)	11.6 (52.9)	5.2 (41.4)	−0.7 (30.7)	−4.5 (23.9)	5.1 (41.1)
Daily mean °C (°F)	−15.3 (4.5)	−12.2 (10.0)	−7.9 (17.8)	−3.1 (26.4)	1.7 (35.1)	5.7 (42.3)	8.4 (47.1)	8.1 (46.6)	4.5 (40.1)	−2.8 (27.0)	−10.2 (13.6)	−14.4 (6.1)	−3.1 (26.4)
Mean daily minimum °C (°F)	−23.2 (−9.8)	−20.5 (−4.9)	−16.1 (3.0)	−10.7 (12.7)	−5.0 (23.0)	0.3 (32.5)	2.9 (37.2)	2.8 (37.0)	−0.6 (30.9)	−8.6 (16.5)	−17.4 (0.7)	−22.2 (−8.0)	−9.9 (14.2)
Record low °C (°F)	−45.2 (−49.4)	−41.8 (−43.2)	−35.5 (−31.9)	−22.0 (−7.6)	−16.4 (2.5)	−10.2 (13.6)	−6.7 (19.9)	−8.5 (16.7)	−10.8 (12.6)	−38.9 (−38.0)	−42.8 (−45.0)	−44.2 (−47.6)	−45.2 (−49.4)
Average precipitation mm (inches)	1.5 (0.06)	1.9 (0.07)	2.5 (0.10)	6.9 (0.27)	23.9 (0.94)	66.0 (2.60)	80.3 (3.16)	72.6 (2.86)	46.7 (1.84)	8.3 (0.33)	1.5 (0.06)	0.9 (0.04)	313 (12.33)
Average precipitation days (≥ 0.1 mm)	3.6	3.3	4.3	6.4	12.8	19.0	18.2	17.9	16.2	6.4	1.9	2.1	112.1
Average snowy days	7.1	6.8	8.7	10.2	16.8	11.6	3.0	2.6	9.7	9.6	4.0	3.9	94
Average relative humidity (%)	43	40	40	45	54	65	65	66	68	56	45	42	52
Mean monthly sunshine hours	219.5	201.8	235.5	251.7	263.5	236.7	250.7	239.5	230.2	260.0	241.6	233.4	2,864.1
Percentage possible sunshine	69	64	63	64	61	55	58	58	63	75	79	76	65
Source: China Meteorological Administration

== See also ==
- Qinghai–Tibet Railway
- List of stations on Qinghai–Tibet railway

Preceding station	China Railway	Following station
Wuli towards Xining	Qinghai–Tibet railway	Kaixinling towards Lhasa
