= Wen Guodong =

Chinese politician

- 文国栋

Vice Governor of Qinghai
- In office July 2020 – September 2020
- Governor: Xin Changxing

Communist Party Secretary of Haixi Mongol and Tibetan Autonomous Prefecture
- In office July 2015 – July 2020
- Preceded by: Xin Guobin
- Succeeded by: Yin Bai

Communist Party Secretary of Yushu Tibetan Autonomous Prefecture
- In office February 2013 – July 2015
- Preceded by: Danke
- Succeeded by: Wu Dejun

Personal details
- Born: August 1969 (age 57) Xining, Qinghai, China
- Party: Chinese Communist Party (expelled; 1995-2021)
- Education: Huangzhong County Normal College

Chinese name
- Traditional Chinese: 文國棟
- Simplified Chinese: 文国栋
Transcriptions
Standard Mandarin
- Hanyu Pinyin: Wén Guódòng

Wen Guodong (Chinese: 文国栋; born August 1968) is a former Chinese politician who spent his entire career in northwest China's Qinghai province. He was investigated by China's top anti-graft agency in September 2020. Previously he served as vice governor of Qinghai. He entered the workforce in July 1987, and joined the Chinese Communist Party in August 1995.

== Biography ==
Born in Xining, Qinghai in August 1968, he started his career in July 1987 as a school teacher in Huangzhong County after graduating from Huangzhong County Normal College.

== Career ==
Two years later, he joined the Radio and Television Bureau as a reporter and secretary. After working as a secretary in the Office of CPC Huangzhong County Committee for eight months, he was transferred to Haidong and worked as a secretary. In April 1996, he was transferred again to Haibei Tibetan Autonomous Prefecture, where he ultimately became director of the Office and deputy secretary general of CPC Haibei Municipal Committee. In June 2001 he was promoted to become party chief of Menyuan Hui Autonomous County, concurrently holding the chairman of the Standing Committee of the People's Congress, the top legislature in the county. In September 2005 he was appointed head of Organization Department of Haixi Mongol and Tibetan Autonomous Prefecture Committee of the Chinese Communist Party and in April 2009 was elevated to deputy mayor of Haixi Mongol and Tibetan Autonomous Prefecture. He served as deputy party chief of Yushu Tibetan Autonomous Prefecture in April 2010, and in February 2013 was promoted to the party chief position. During his time as deputy party chief, the 2010 Yushu earthquake occurred on April 14, 2,698 people were confirmed dead, 270 missing and 12,135 injured, 1,434 of them severely. In July 2015, he was transferred back to Haixi Mongol and Tibetan Autonomous Prefecture and was appointed party chief. Five years later, he rose to become vice governor of Qinghai, a position at vice-ministerial level. Wen was involved in the large-scale illegal mining case in Haixi Mongol and Tibetan Autonomous Prefecture, which made headlines nationwide for the severe damage caused to the Qilian Mountains.

== Investigation ==
On September 6, 2020, Wen handed himself in to the anti-corruption agency of China. That same day, he has been placed under investigation for "serious violations of laws and regulations" by the Central Commission for Discipline Inspection (CCDI), the party's internal disciplinary body, and the National Supervisory Commission, the highest anti-corruption agency of China. One month ago, vice mayor of Haixi Mongol and Tibetan Autonomous Prefecture Liang Yanguo (梁彦国) and Li Yongping (李永平), vice mayor of Xining, were removed from their posts for alleged dereliction of supervision duty on illicit mining in Muli coal field in Qilian Mountains. Another three officials from local supervision departments in Haixi Mongol and Tibetan Autonomous Prefecture were also sacked and placed under investigation. Other officials from the prefecture's government, the Qaidam Circular Economy Pilot Zone (柴达木循环经济试验区) that oversees the mountains, the natural resource department and the ecology and environment department were also being investigated.

On January 4, 2021, he has been expelled from the CCP and dismissed from public office. His qualification for delegates to the 19th National Congress of the Chinese Communist Party and to the 13th CPC Qinghai Provincial Congress was terminated. On July 16, he stood trial at the First Intermediate People's Court of Chongqing on charges of taking bribes. Prosecutors accused him of taking advantage of his different positions in Qinghai between 2009 and 2020 to seek profits for various companies and individuals in business operation, project contracting and other matters. In return, he accepted money and property worth over 19.91 million yuan ($3.08 million).

On March 29, 2022, he was sentenced to 11 years in prison and fined two million yuan.

Party political offices
| Preceded by Danke | Communist Party Secretary of Yushu Tibetan Autonomous Prefecture; 2013-2015 | Succeeded by Wu Dejun |
| Preceded by Xin Guobin | Communist Party Secretary of Haixi Mongol and Tibetan Autonomous Prefecture; 2015-2020 | Succeeded by Yin Bai |
