= Tanggulashan =

Tanggula 唐古拉山镇 · གདང་ལ་གྲོང་རྡལ།
- Town
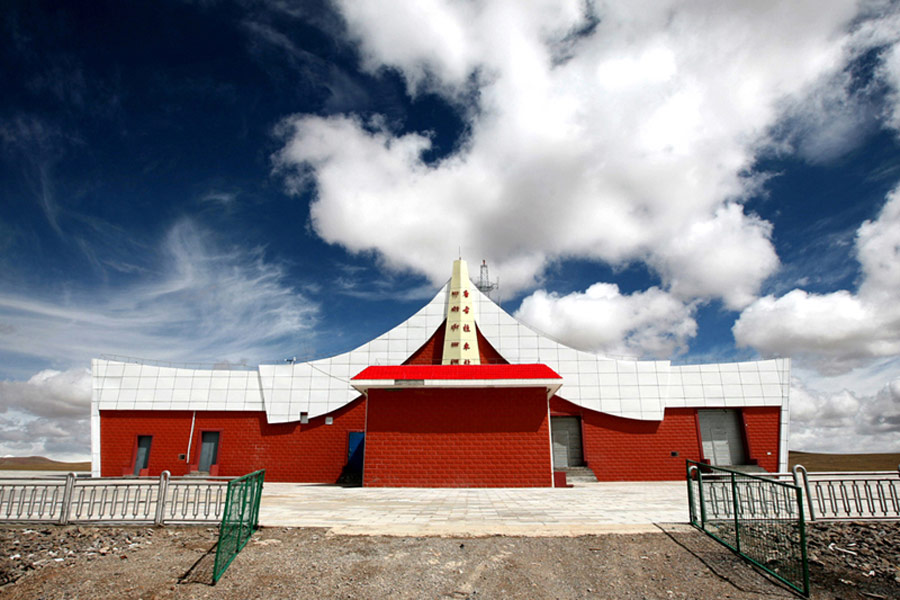
- Tanggula Railway Station

- Location within Qinghai
- Coordinates: 34°13′53″N 92°26′33″E
- Country: China
- Province: Qinghai
- Autonomous prefecture: Haixi
- County-level city: Golmud

Area
  - Total: 47,540.08 km^{2} (18,355.33 sq mi)
- Elevation: 4,535 m (14,879 ft)

Population (2020)
  - Total: 1,750
  - Density: 0.0368/km^{2} (0.0953/sq mi)
- Time zone: UTC+8 (China Standard)
- Postal code: 632801101
- Area code: 896

Tanggulashan / Danglarong

Chinese name
- Chinese: 唐古拉山
Transcriptions
Standard Mandarin
- Hanyu Pinyin: Tánggǔlāshān

Tibetan name
- Tibetan: གདང་ལ་གྲོང།
Transcriptions
- Wylie: gdang la grong
- Tibetan Pinyin: Dangla Chong

Tanggula / Dangla

Chinese name
- Chinese: 唐古拉
Transcriptions
Standard Mandarin
- Hanyu Pinyin: Tánggǔlā

Tibetan name
- Tibetan: གདང་ལ་གྲོང།
Transcriptions
- Tibetan Pinyin: Dangla

Tanggulashan (simplified Chinese: 唐古拉山镇; traditional Chinese: 唐古拉山鎮; pinyin: Tánggǔlāshān Zhèn; lit. 'Tanggula Mountains town', Standard Tibetan: གདང་ལ་གྲོང་རྡལ།), or Dangla Town, is a town in the southwest of Qinghai province, China. It forms the southern exclave of the county-level city of Golmud, in Haixi Mongol and Tibetan Autonomous Prefecture, partially administrated by Amdo County, Tibet Autonomous Region since 1963 and still officially a territory of Yushu Prefecture, Qinghai under trust administration of Golmud, Haixi Prefecture, Qinghai. Before the local administrative reform of 2005, it was a township (唐古拉山乡). It is the only place in China simultaneously under jurisdiction of three prefectures.

The town spans an area of approximately 48,000 square kilometres (19,000 mi^{2}), and has a population of 1,957 as of 2025.

== Toponymy ==
The town's Tibetan name stands for "mountain that eagles cannot fly over".

== History ==
On the eve of the annexation of Tibet by China, a local rebellion broke out in and around the nearby town of Yushu, causing many members of the Duoma tribe (Chinese: 多玛部落; pinyin: Duōmǎ bùluò), chiefly herdsmen and sheperds, to flee to present-day Tanggulashan for refuge.

In the early 1960s, the administrative divisions of Qinghai and Tibet were reorganized, and the area of Tanggulashan was placed under the jurisdiction of the province of Qinghai.

== Geography ==
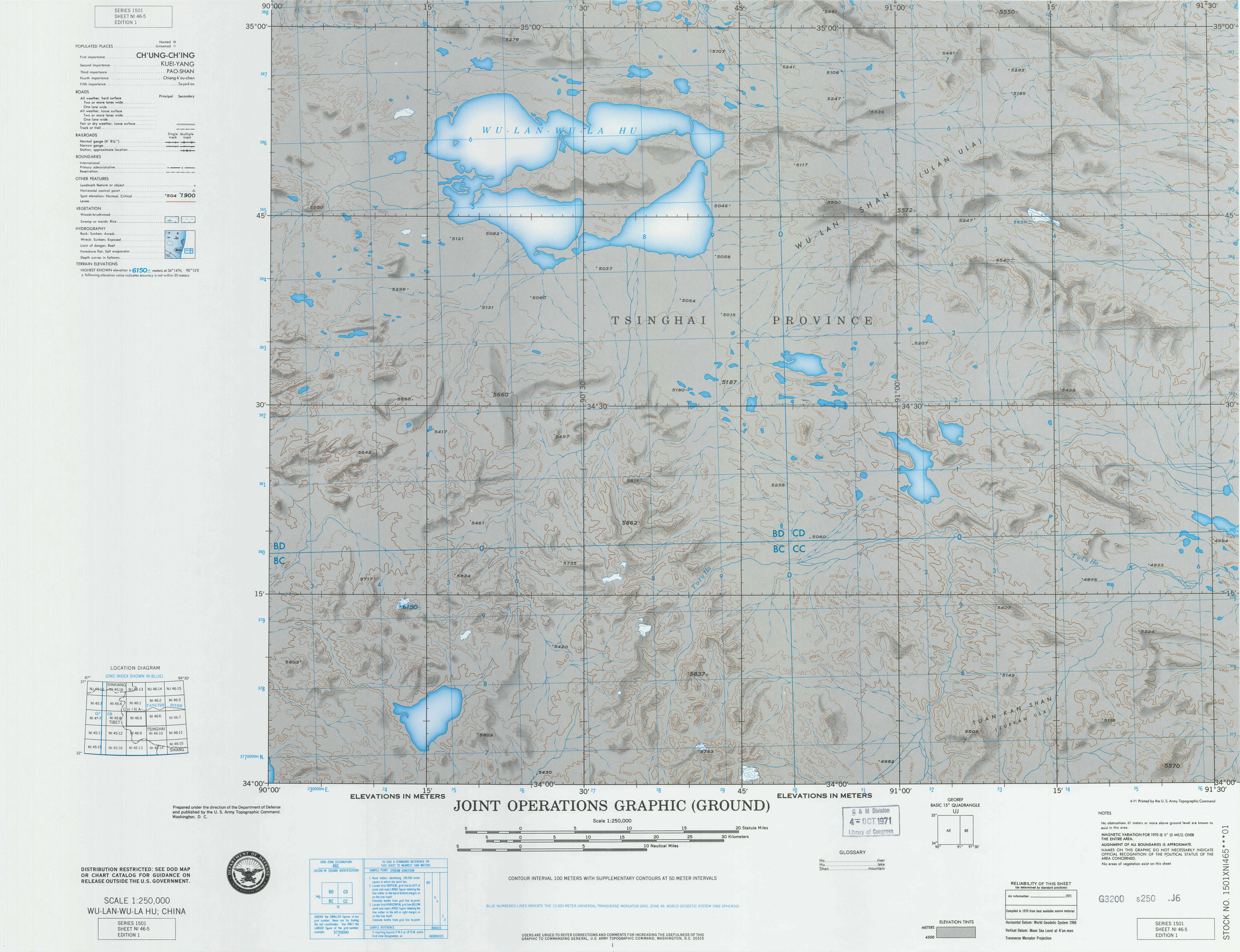

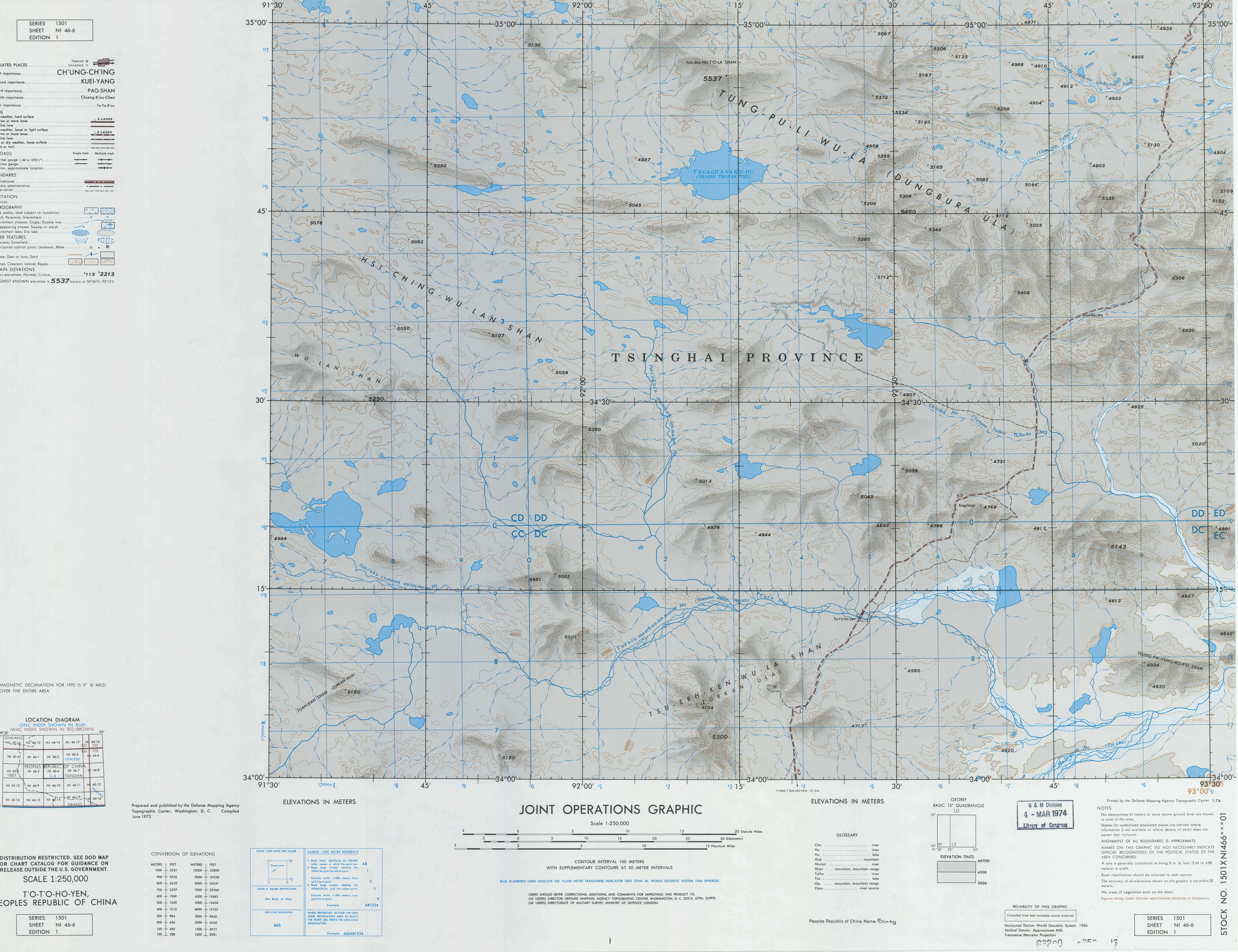
Map including To-t'o-ho-yen (DMA, 1973)

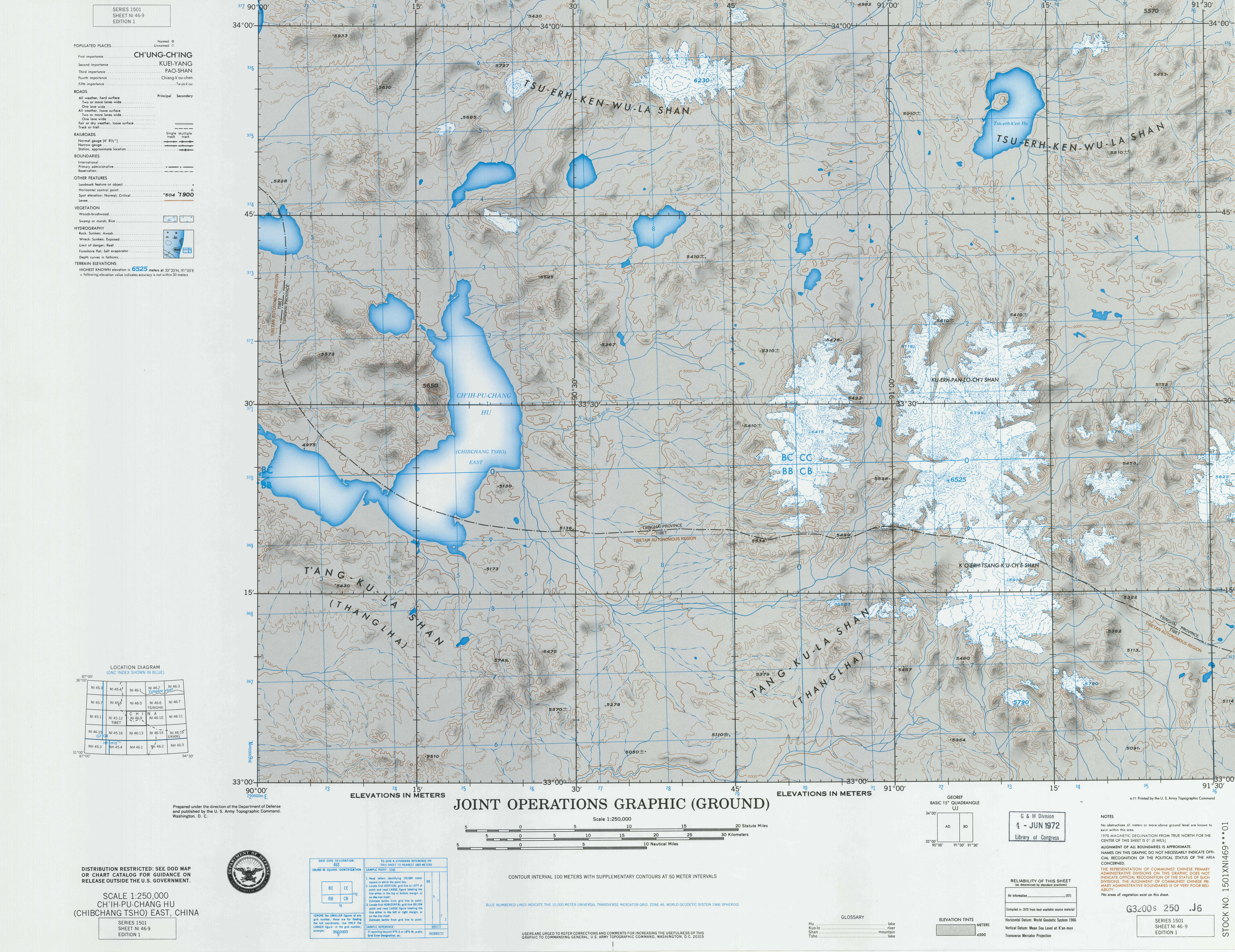
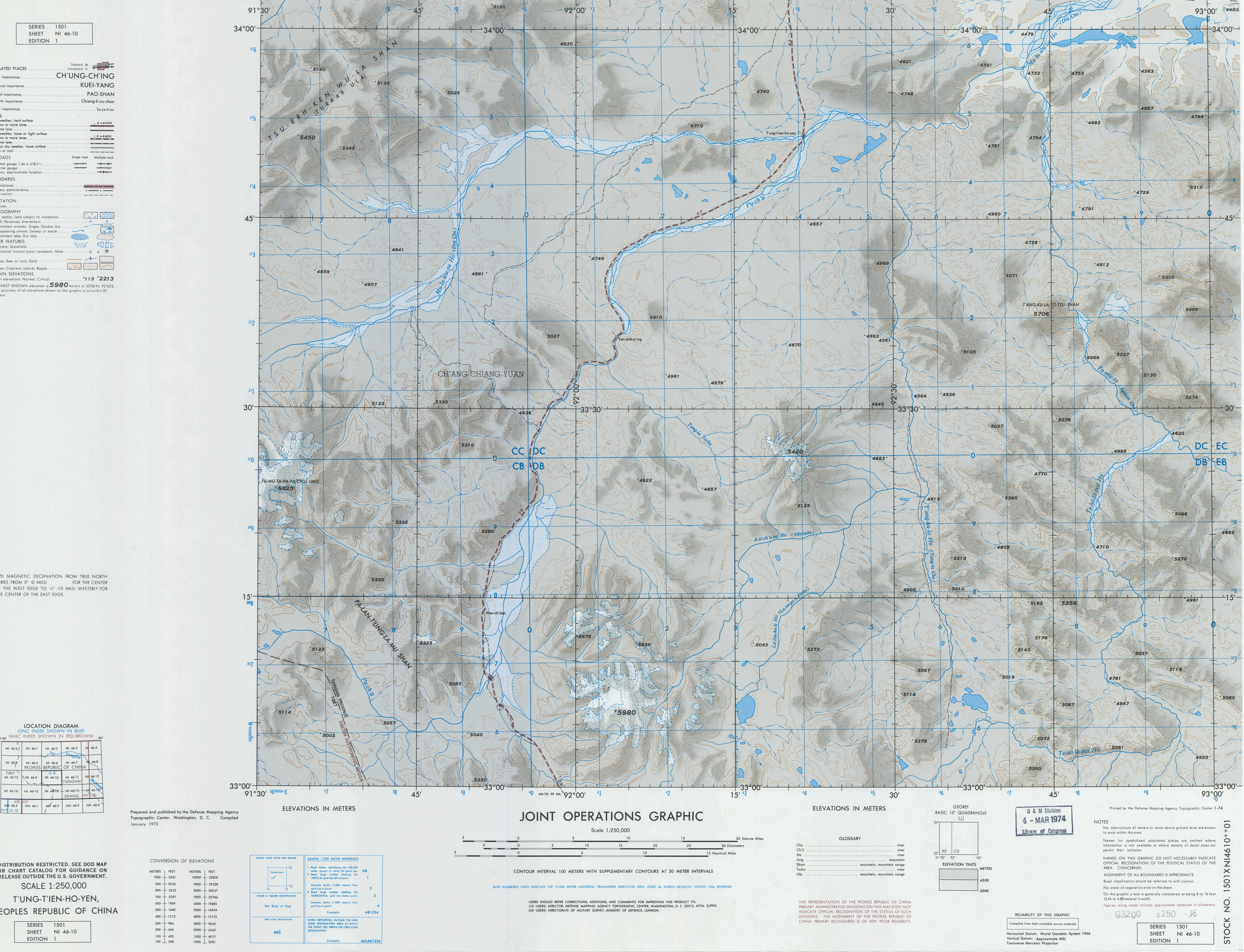

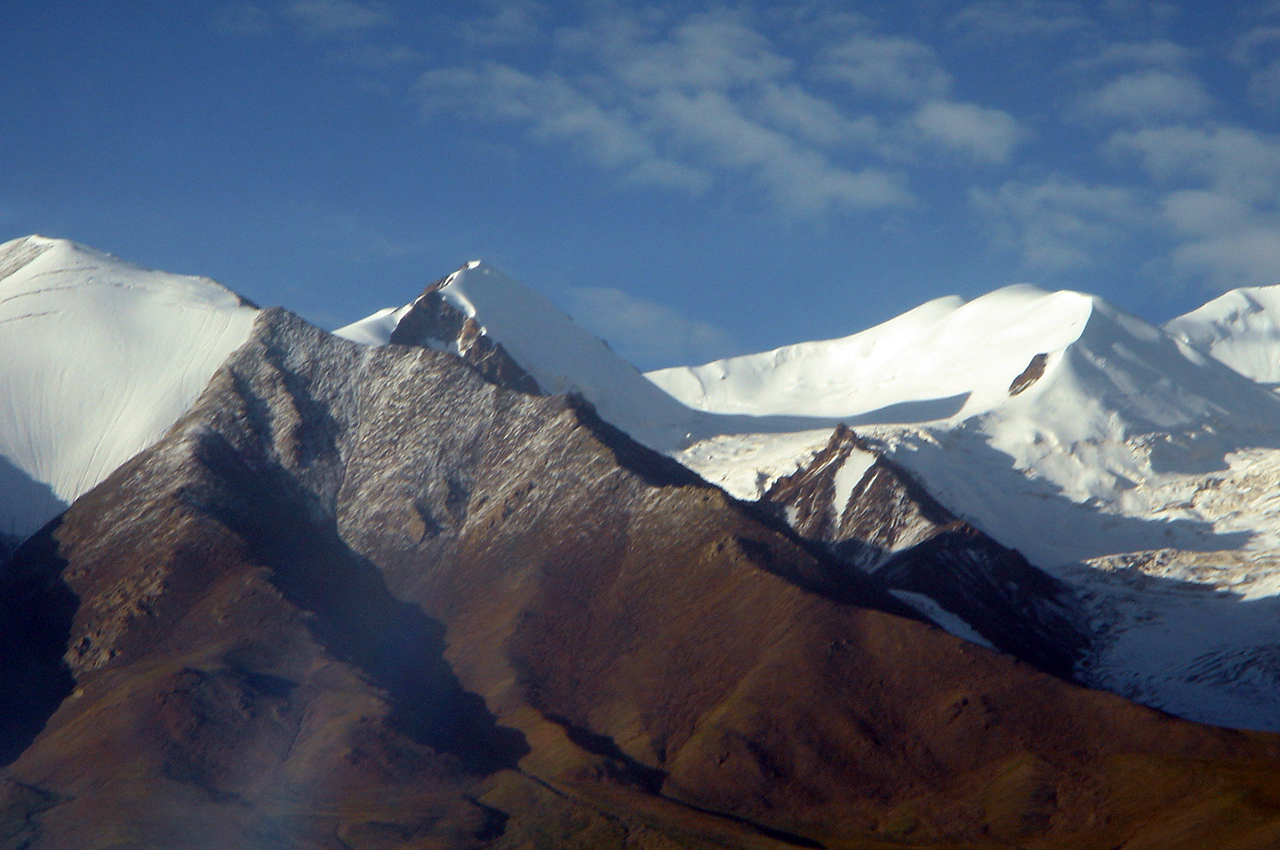
Tanggula Mountains, Tanggula Town

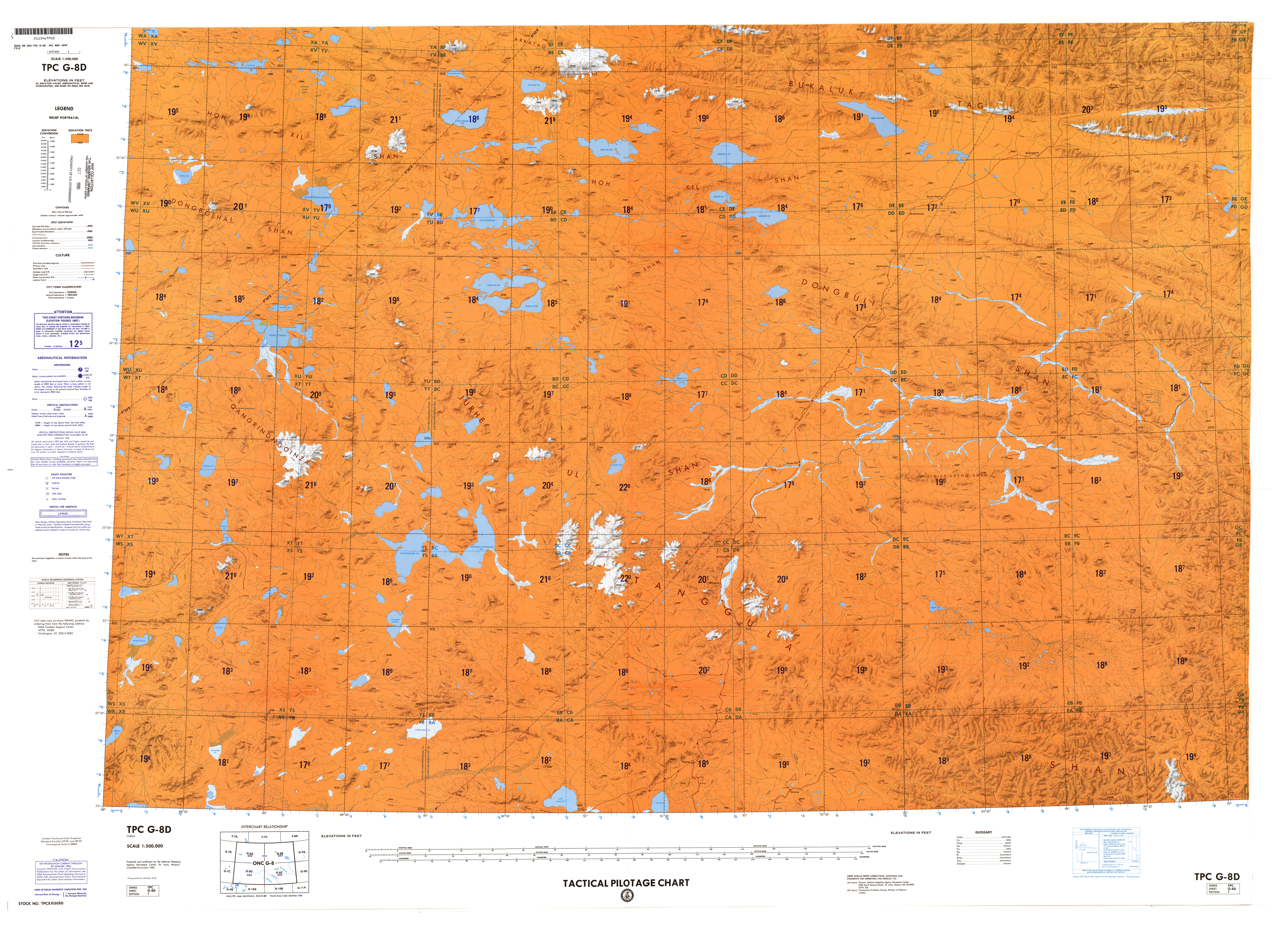
Map including Tanggulashan (DMA, 1990)

Tanggula Town is an administrative unit that occupies 47,540 square kilometres (18,360 sq mi) in the southwestern corner of Qinghai province. It borders on the Tibet Autonomous Region in the south and west, and on Qinghai's Yushu Tibetan Autonomous Prefecture in the east and north. The western "panhandle" of Yushu Prefecture separates Tanggula Town from the rest of Haixi Prefecture, making it an exclave of Golmud City and of the Haixi Mongol and Tibetan Autonomous Prefecture.

Tanggula Town is around 500 kilometres (310 mi) away (straight-line distance) both from the central city of Golmud and from the town of Gyêgu, the seat of Yushu Prefecture, but it has practical road (and rail) connection only with the former.

The Tanggula settlement, also known as Marquwo, Tuotuoheyan, or Togtogquwo, is located at 4,535 metres (14,879 ft) above sea level in the central part of Tanggula Mountains, as the town's name indicates. The town's area includes the Geladaindong Peak, a mountain which stands at 6,621 metres (21,722 ft) in elevation. The mountain is notable for its proximity to the source of the Tuotuo River, which itself is one of the sources of the Yangtze River. The area around the peak is protected as part of the Sanjiangyuan National Nature Reserve, which the town is located near. The main settlement is located near the highway and railway crossing of the Tuotuo River, which is one of the headwaters of the Yangtze. This settlement is served by the Togtogquwo railway station. Other settlements in the same highway/railway corridor, further south, are Tongtian Heyan ("Tongtian Riverside"), Yanshiping, Wenquan, and Tanggula Bingzhan ("Tanggula Military Post").

Most of the town's area is mountainous, and open grasslands cover much of the town's remaining area. Grazing is prohibited or highly regulated on much of Tanggulashan's grasslands.

Tanggula Town is administratively divided into 8 village-level units (seven nomads' committee and one villagers' committee). The region is sparsely populated, with the registered population of 1,286 (year 2006) and the present population estimated at 1,900. Most of these people live in several small villages located along the Golmud-Lhasa highway and railway corridor (China National Highway 109 and Qinghai-Tibet Railway).

At Tanggula Pass on the southern border of the province, the railway leaves Qinghai for Tibet, and therefore the Tanggula railway station, which is located a short distance south of the pass, is actually outside of Tanggula Town, and is already within the Tibet Autonomous Region.

=== Climate ===
Tanggulashan has an alpine climate (Köppen ET) with long, frigid, very dry winters and short, cool, damp summers.

Climate data for Tanggulashan Town (Tuotuohe), elevation 4,533 m (14,872 ft), (1991–2020 normals, extremes 1981–2010)
Month	Jan	Feb	Mar	Apr	May	Jun	Jul	Aug	Sep	Oct	Nov	Dec	Year
Record high °C (°F)	6.7 (44.1)	6.7 (44.1)	12.0 (53.6)	16.2 (61.2)	21.8 (71.2)	24.7 (76.5)	23.0 (73.4)	22.3 (72.1)	19.4 (66.9)	16.6 (61.9)	7.9 (46.2)	6.0 (42.8)	24.7 (76.5)
Mean daily maximum °C (°F)	−6.0 (21.2)	−3.3 (26.1)	0.9 (33.6)	5.4 (41.7)	9.5 (49.1)	12.7 (54.9)	15.1 (59.2)	14.8 (58.6)	11.6 (52.9)	5.2 (41.4)	−0.7 (30.7)	−4.5 (23.9)	5.1 (41.1)
Daily mean °C (°F)	−15.3 (4.5)	−12.2 (10.0)	−7.9 (17.8)	−3.1 (26.4)	1.7 (35.1)	5.7 (42.3)	8.4 (47.1)	8.1 (46.6)	4.5 (40.1)	−2.8 (27.0)	−10.2 (13.6)	−14.4 (6.1)	−3.1 (26.4)
Mean daily minimum °C (°F)	−23.2 (−9.8)	−20.5 (−4.9)	−16.1 (3.0)	−10.7 (12.7)	−5.0 (23.0)	0.3 (32.5)	2.9 (37.2)	2.8 (37.0)	−0.6 (30.9)	−8.6 (16.5)	−17.4 (0.7)	−22.2 (−8.0)	−9.9 (14.2)
Record low °C (°F)	−45.2 (−49.4)	−41.8 (−43.2)	−35.5 (−31.9)	−22.0 (−7.6)	−16.4 (2.5)	−10.2 (13.6)	−6.7 (19.9)	−8.5 (16.7)	−10.8 (12.6)	−38.9 (−38.0)	−42.8 (−45.0)	−44.2 (−47.6)	−45.2 (−49.4)
Average precipitation mm (inches)	1.5 (0.06)	1.9 (0.07)	2.5 (0.10)	6.9 (0.27)	23.9 (0.94)	66.0 (2.60)	80.3 (3.16)	72.6 (2.86)	46.7 (1.84)	8.3 (0.33)	1.5 (0.06)	0.9 (0.04)	313 (12.33)
Average precipitation days (≥ 0.1 mm)	3.6	3.3	4.3	6.4	12.8	19.0	18.2	17.9	16.2	6.4	1.9	2.1	112.1
Average snowy days	7.1	6.8	8.7	10.2	16.8	11.6	3.0	2.6	9.7	9.6	4.0	3.9	94
Average relative humidity (%)	43	40	40	45	54	65	65	66	68	56	45	42	52
Mean monthly sunshine hours	219.5	201.8	235.5	251.7	263.5	236.7	250.7	239.5	230.2	260.0	241.6	233.4	2,864.1
Percentage possible sunshine	69	64	63	64	61	55	58	58	63	75	79	76	65
Source: China Meteorological Administration

== Demographics ==
As of 2025, Tanggulashan is home to a population of 1,957, who reside in 652 different households.

Tibetans who live in Tanggulashan largely hail from the Duoma tribe (Chinese: 多玛部落; pinyin: Duōmǎ bùluò), one of the eight Tibetan tribes in the Amdo region.

According to a 2021 publication by the Golmud city government, 247 people in Tanggulashan are members of the Chinese Communist Party.

Historical population
Year	Pop.	±%
2010	1,605	—
2020	1,750	+9.0%
2025	1,957	+11.8%

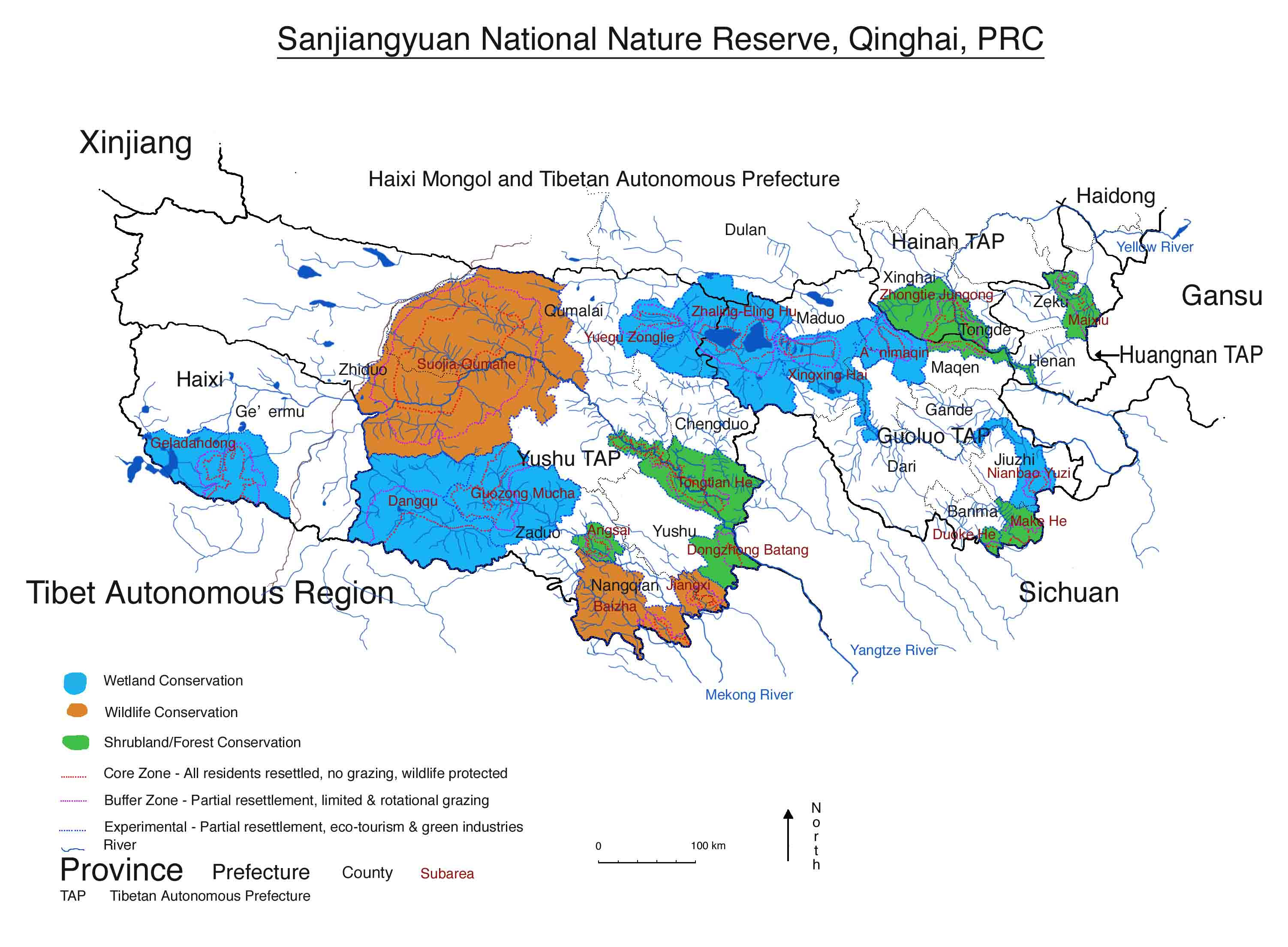
The map of the Sanjiangyuan Nature Reserve lands in southern Qinghai. Prefecture borders are shown in black; the area labeled "Haixi" and "Ge'ermu" (Golmud) in the southwest is Tanngulashan Town. The reserve section within the town is the Geladandong wetland conservation zone, around the mountain peak of the same name

== Economy ==
The traditional occupation of the local residents is the raising and breeding of livestock. Specific breeds of sheep and yak, such as the Tanggula yak (Chinese: 唐古拉牦牛; pinyin: Tánggǔlā máoniú) and the Tibetan sheep (Chinese: 藏羊; pinyin: Zàng yáng), have received geographical indication from the Ministry of Agriculture of China. As of 2020, the average annual income for a herder in Tanggulashan totaled 29,020 renminbi (RMB). According to the local authorities in Golmud, overgrazing is a concern in the area, as it is throughout the southwestern Qinghai. As a result, grazing is restricted and limited in certain areas, and projects are underway to reduce the livestock population in Tanggulashan to what is thought to be the "scientifically sound" target of 53,600. The Chinese government had announced in 2016 that it wished to build the 'First ecological town' at the source of the Yangtze, which is in and around the area of Tanggulashan. A water sanitation facility was constructed in 2019, and since 2016, 226 million Yuan has been invested into the region, including the Sanjiangyuan National Nature Reserve, which has been subject to a lot of recent development and protection.

The total economic output of Tanggulashan in 2022 was 2.2 million CNY.

Besides overgrazing by livestock, the local pasture land also suffers depredation by rats. After some attempts to poison them (with obvious side effects), in 2009 the local authorities started a campaign to attract birds of prey to the area, hoping that they would help to keep the rat population under control. For this purpose, 830 bird perches were erected in the affected areas.

In 2007, it was reported that a factory producing traditional Tibetan carpets opened in the area, employing about 80 people.

== Transportation ==
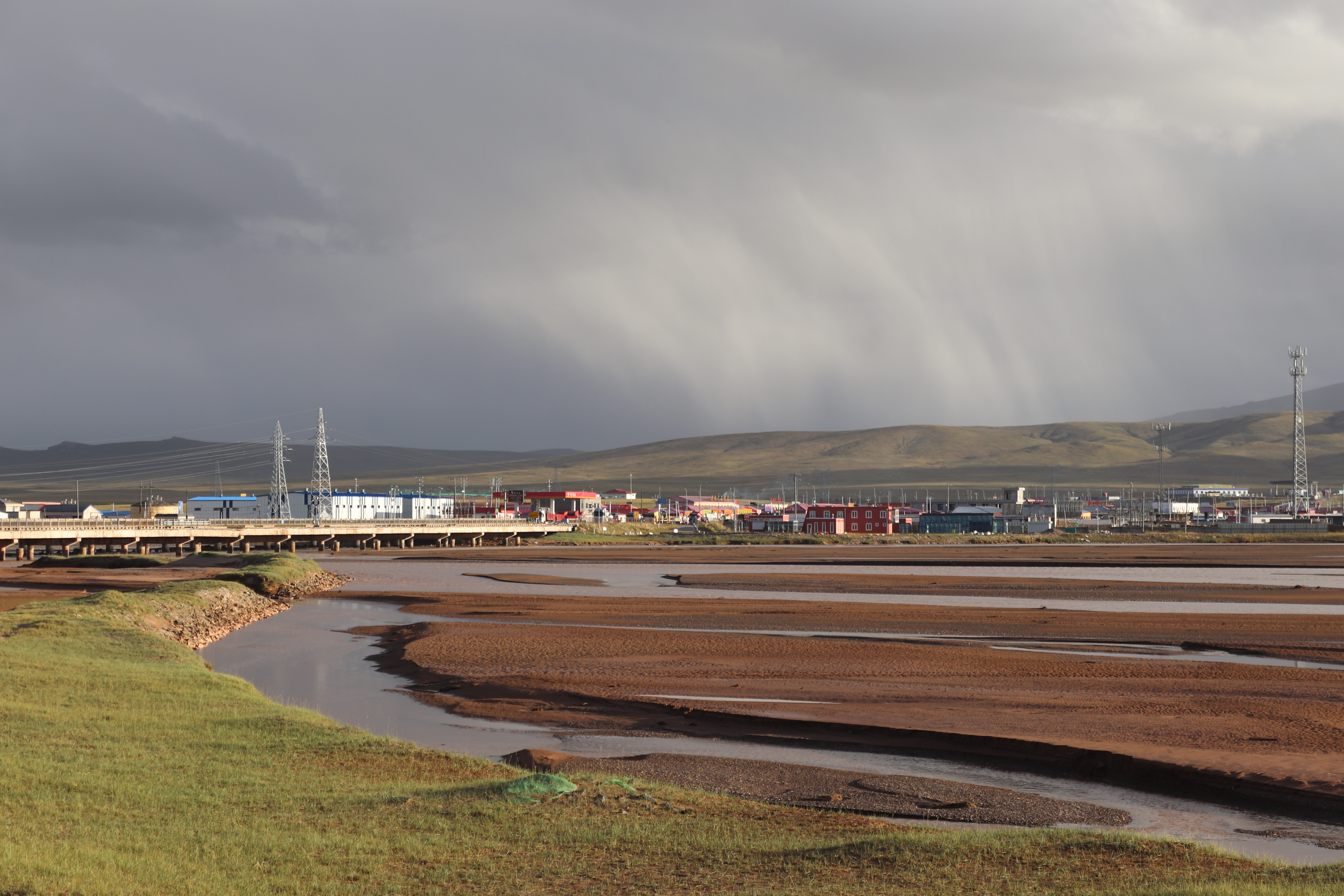
The town of Tanggulashan

The town is served by the Tanggula railway station, which lies along the Qingzang Railway, which runs through Tanggulashan on its way to Lhasa, with the section running through being the highest segment of railway on earth. Additionally, the G109, which leads from Beijing to Lhasa, runs through Tanggulashan.
