= Baigong pipes =

Feature near Delingha, Qinghai, China

Coordinates: 37°9′19″N 97°0′2″E

The Baigong pipes, which are also known as 白公山铁管 (BaiGongShan Iron Pipes) and Delingha pipes, are a series of pipe-like fossilized tree roots found on and near White Mountain (Chinese: 白公山; pinyin: Báigōngshān 'Mount Baigong'), about 40 kilometers (25 mi) southwest of the city of Delingha, in the Haixi Mongol and Tibetan Autonomous Prefecture, Qinghai Province, China.

== White Mountain (白公山) ==
Some of the Baigong pipes are reported to be associated with three caves in White Mountain. These caves are reported to occur within the front face of White Mountain. The mouths of the two smaller caves have collapsed. Only the largest cave, which is 6 meters (18 feet) high, can be entered.

Two pipe-like structures have been reported from the largest cave. One of these is described as being 40 cm (16 in) in diameter and there are more along a nearby salt lake, where similar formations were found on shore and within Tuosu Lake, also transliterated as Lake Toson, which lies 80 meters (260 feet) from the mouth of the largest cave. On the beach of the lake, about 80 meters (130 feet) from the mouth of the largest cave, more pipes were found.

== Investigation ==
Associated with these pipe-like features are objects that were described as "rusty scraps" and "strangely shaped stones". Analysis of the former by Liu Shaolin at a local smeltery reportedly found that they consist of 30 percent ferric oxide (oxidized iron) and large amounts of silicon dioxide and calcium oxide. Because any metallurgical analysis reports the composition of a material analyzed not in terms of the actual minerals comprising it, but only in terms of percentages of the oxides of the specific elements present, the calcium present in the analyzed material could have been in the form of calcite, a mineral that naturally forms concretions.

According to news stories the pipes were first discovered by a group of scientists from the United States who were seeking dinosaur fossils. The scientists are said to have reported the formations to local authorities in Delingha. However, the pipes did not attract attention until a later report, possibly one of six made by Ye Zhou, appeared in the Henan Dahe Bao (河南大河报 'Henan Great River News') in June 2002. Quin Jianwen, a local official, discussed the pipe-like features with journalists of the Xinhua News Agency on June 16, 2002. The local government now promotes the features as a tourist attraction, to which road signs and tourist guides lead visitors.

According to a 2003 article in the Xinmin Weekly, Chinese scientists using atomic emission spectroscopy found the Baigong Pipes to contain organic matter of plant origin. In addition, the news article also stated that tree rings were found in sections of these rock formations and, as a result, they were judged to be fossil trees or tree roots.

The state-run newspaper People's Daily reported on a 2007 investigation in which a research fellow from the Chinese Earthquake Administration reported they had found some of the pipes to be highly radioactive.

== Sources ==
- Dunning, Brian (November 24, 2009). "Skeptoid #181: The Baigong Pipes". Skeptoid.
