= La Rinconada =

La Rinconada may refer to:

- La Rinconada, Andalusia, Spain; a municipality
- La Rinconada, Albacete, Spain; a municipality
- La Rinconada de la Sierra, Salamanca, Spain; a municipality
- La Rinconada, Peru; a mining town
- La Rinconada, Caracas, Venezuela; a district
- La Rinconada Hippodrome, Coche, Libertador, Caracas, Venezuela; a racetrack
- La Rinconada station, La Rinconada, Caracas, Venezuela; a metro station on Line 3
- La Rinconada Baseball Stadium, La Rinconada, Caracas, Venezuela; a stadium

== See also ==
- Rinconada (disambiguation)
