= Mina Pirquitas =

- Municipality and town
- Interactive map of Mina Pirquitas
- Coordinates: 22°41′41″S 66°29′55″W
- Country: Argentina
- Province: Jujuy Province
- Department: Rinconada
- Elevation: 14,240 ft (4,340 m)

Population
  - Total: 673
- Time zone: UTC−3 (ART)

Mina Pirquitas is a town and municipality in Jujuy Province in Argentina in the Rinconada Department, in Coyaguaima district, 355 km from the capital of Jujuy, accessed from the town of Abra Pampa by provincial routes 7 and RP 70 (138 km).

== Geography ==
With residences at 4,340 metres (14,240 ft) above sea level, it is the highest Argentinian year-round settlement. The locality of Chico Pairique, at 4,340 metres (14,240 ft) meters, (also located in the Province of Jujuy), is at higher elevations, but was considered by the National Census 1991 as dispersed rural community with little or no year-round residences at those altitudes. The population of the settlement at the mine ranges up to 673 inhabitants, though during initial construction, the region housed about 2000 inhabitants. There are two centers: one administrative (offices, laboratories, hospital, house and chapel) and another to the west about 11 km where "The streak" and where most of the mines are located.

== Importance ==
It lies in one of the most important mining areas. The vein contains mostly cassiterite, a mineral that contains among other elements tin, zinc, and silver. There are traces of other elements such as gold, lead, iridium, palladium and tungsten. Also reported small amounts of radioactive minerals and rare in some parts of the mine.
