= Liviara =

Coordinates: 22°35′S 66°21′W

- Rural municipality and village
- Interactive map of Liviara
- Country: Argentina
- Province: Jujuy Province
- Time zone: UTC−3 (ART)

Liviara is a rural municipality and village in Jujuy Province in Argentina.
