= Lagunillas del Farallón =

Coordinates: 22°24′S 66°07′W

- Rural municipality and village
- Interactive map of Lagunillas del Farallón
- Country: Argentina
- Province: Jujuy Province
- Time zone: UTC−3 (ART)

Lagunillas del Farallón is a rural municipality and village in Jujuy Province in Argentina.
