= Tuiwa =

Tuiwa 推瓦村 མཐུད་བ་གྲོང་ཚོ་
- Village
- Location in Tibet Autonomous Region
- Coordinates: 28°33′48″N 90°31′52″E
- Country: People's Republic of China
- Autonomous region: Tibet Autonomous Region
- Prefecture-level city: Shannan
- County: Nagarzê
- Town: Daglung
- Elevation: 5,070 m (16,630 ft)

Population
  - Total: 159
- Time zone: UTC+8 (China Standard)

Tuiwa (Chinese: 推瓦村; pinyin: Tuīwǎ Cūn; Tibetan: མཐུད་བ་གྲོང་ཚོ་, ZWPY: Tüwa Chongco) is a village located in Daglung Town, Nagarzê County, Shannan, Tibet, located at the northeast shore of Lake Puma Yumco. Tuiwa is the second highest permanent settlement by elevation in the world, after La Rinconada, Peru.

The village is located at an elevation of 5,070 meters above sea level. It is often referred to as "the highest administrative village in the world".

Tuiwa is located in a pastoral region. Animal husbandry is the main source of income for the villagers.

== See also ==
- List of towns and villages in Tibet
- List of highest cities in the world
