= Tanggula Mountains =

Mountain range in Tibet

- Tangla, Tanglha, Dangla Mountains
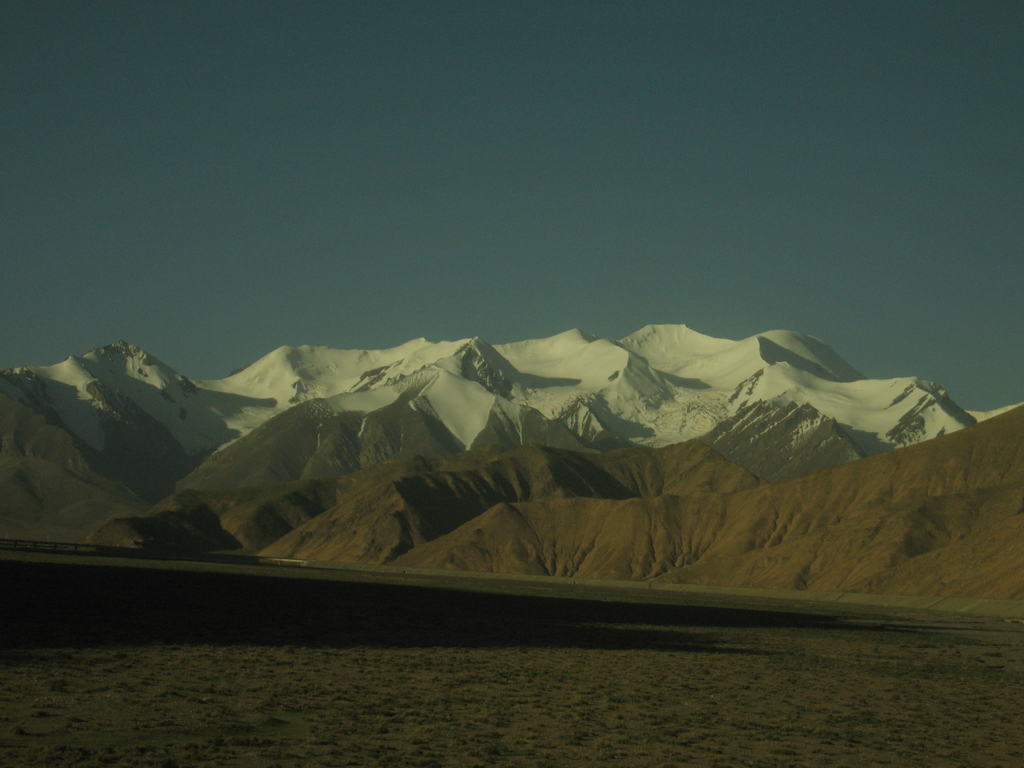
- Tanggula Mountains viewed from Qinghai

Highest point
- Peak: Geladaindong Peak
- Elevation: 6,621 m (21,722 ft)

Dimensions
- Length: 420 km (260 mi)

Geography
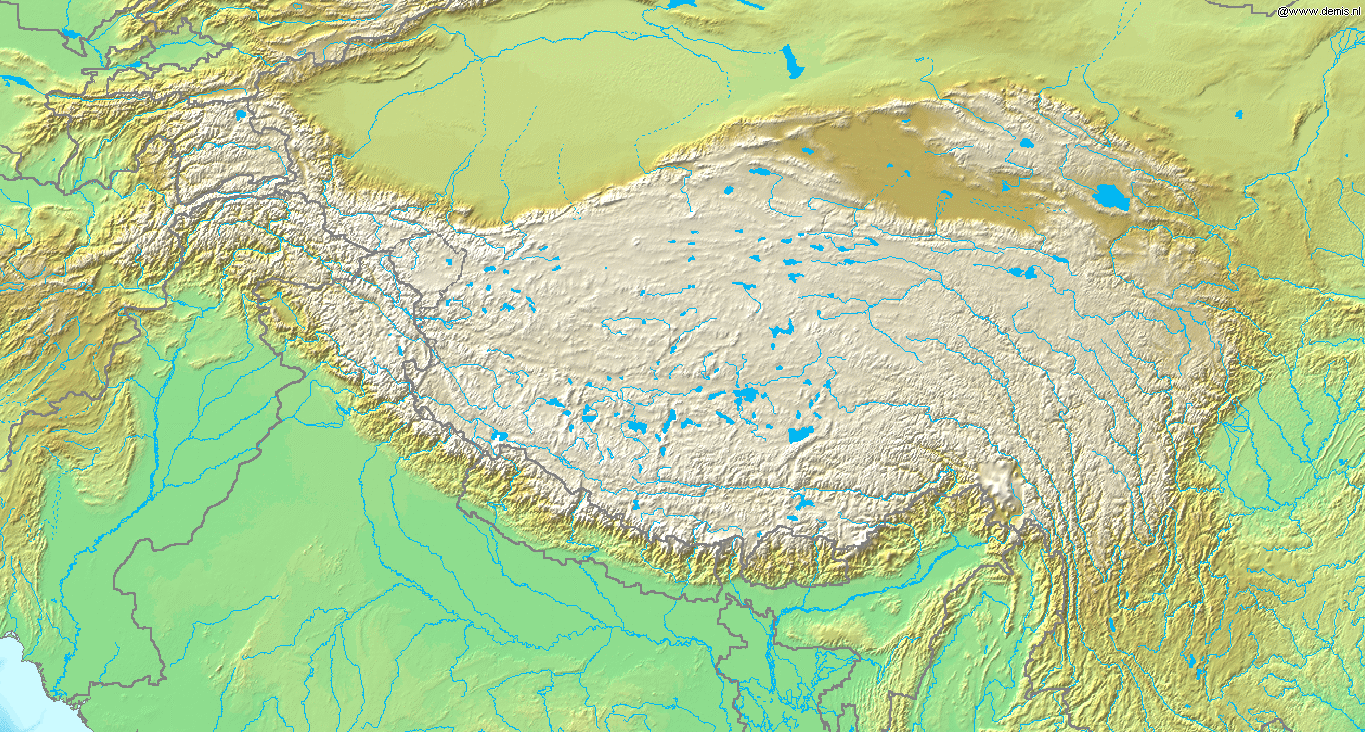
- Location within Tibetan Plateau
- Country: China
- Province/Region: Qinghai and Tibet Autonomous Region
- Range coordinates: 33°30′00″N 91°04′12″E

The Tanggula (Chinese: 唐古拉山, p Tánggǔlāshān, or 唐古拉山脉, p Tánggǔlāshānmài), Tangla, Tanglha, or Dangla Mountains (Tibetan: གདང་ལ་།, w Gdang La, z Dang La) is a mountain range in the central part of the Qinghai-Tibet Plateau in Tibet. Administratively, the range is in the Nagqu Prefecture of the Tibet Autonomous Region, with the central section extending into the Tanggula Town and the eastern section entering the Yushu Tibetan Autonomous Prefecture of Qinghai province.

Tanggula is the source of the Ulan Moron and Dam Qu Rivers, the geographic headwaters of the Yangtze River. It functions as a dividing range between the basin of the Yangtze in the north and the endorheic basin of northeastern Tibet in the south.

== Overview ==
The elevations of the main ridge average over 5,000 m (16,404 ft). The Yangtze River originates in this mountain range; Geladandong, 6,621 metres or 21,722 feet high, located in Tanggula Town, is the tallest peak in the range.

The Qinghai-Tibet Highway and the Qinghai-Tibet Railway cross the Tanggula Mountains at Tanggula Mountain Pass. This is the highest point of the Qinghai-Tibet Railway, and the highest point of any railway in the world, at 5,072 metres (16,640 feet) above sea level. On account of snow and occasional road accidents, highway closures and concomitant traffic delays are not uncommon.

The mountains lie within the Tibetan Plateau alpine shrub and meadows ecoregion.

== See also ==
- Geladandong
- Nyenchen Tanglha Mountains
- Tanggula Pass
- Tanggula railway station
- Tanggula North railway station
- Tanggula South railway station
- Tibetan Plateau
