= Tanggula Pass =

Mountain pass between Qinghai and Tibet, China

Tanggu La
- Chinese: 唐古拉山口; Tánggǔlā Shānkǒu
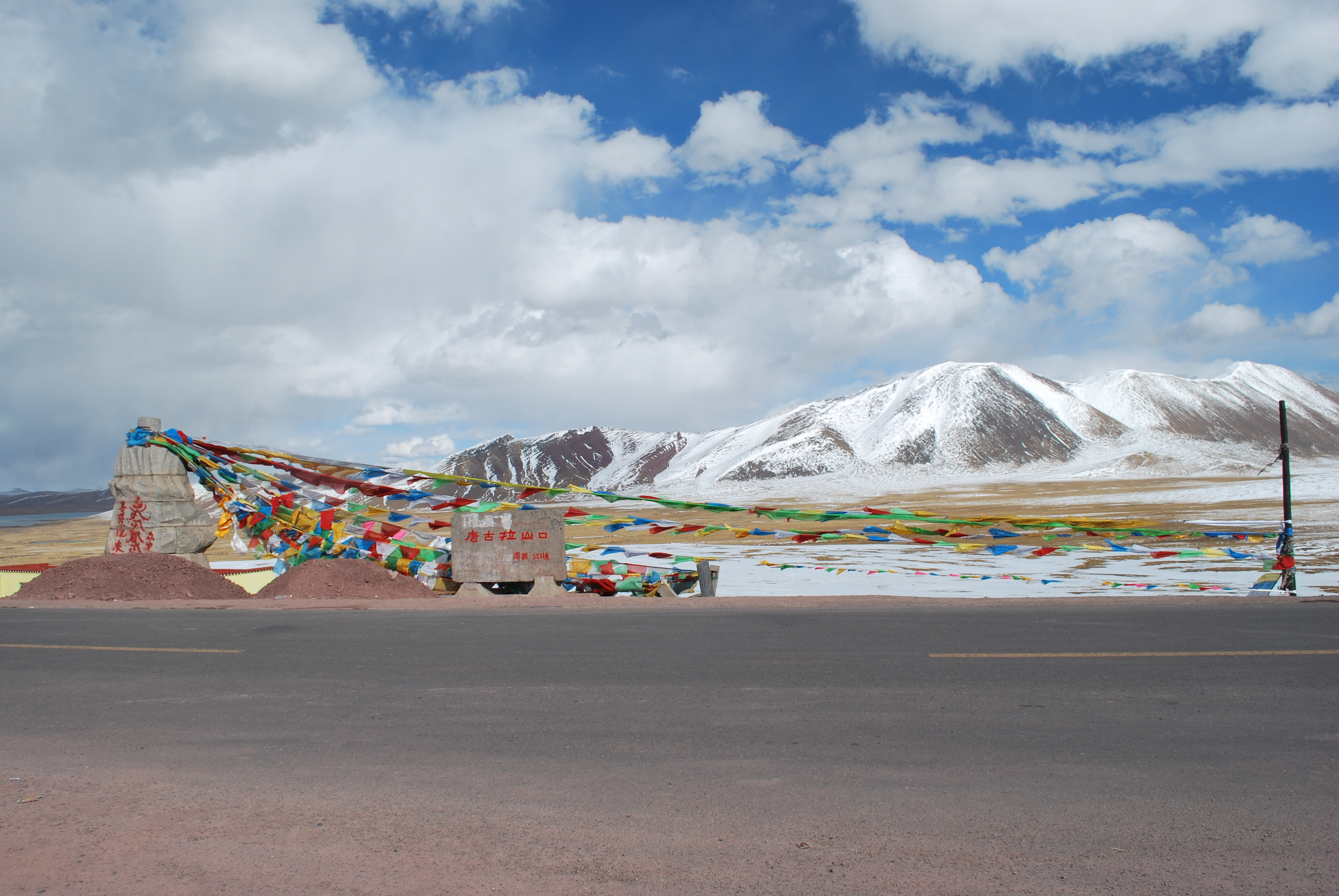
- Tanggu La marker on Qinghai–Tibet Highway

- Location within Tibet Location within Qinghai Location within China
- Elevation: 5,072 meters (16,640 ft) (railway); 5,231 meters (17,162 ft) (road)
- Traversed by: G109

Third Approach
- Location: Tibet Autonomous Region and Qinghai Province, China
- Range: Tanggula Mountains
- Coordinates: 33°00′39″N 91°39′50″E

Tanggula Pass

Chinese name
- Traditional Chinese: 唐古拉山口
- Simplified Chinese: 唐古拉山口
Transcriptions
Standard Mandarin
- Hanyu Pinyin: Tánggǔlā Shānkǒu

Tibetan name
- Tibetan: གདང་ལ
Transcriptions
- Wylie: gdang la
- Tibetan Pinyin: dang la

The Tanggu La, Tangla Pass, or Tanggu Pass (Chinese: 唐古拉山口; Standard Tibetan: གདང་ལ) is a wide mountain pass in Southwest China over 5,000 meters (16,000 ft) in elevation, used by both the Qinghai–Tibet Highway and Qinghai–Tibet Railway to cross the Tanggula Mountains. These mountains on the Tibetan Plateau separate the Tibet Autonomous Region from the Qinghai province, and also form part of the watershed separating the Yangtze River to the north from a zone of endorheic basins with internal drainage to the south.

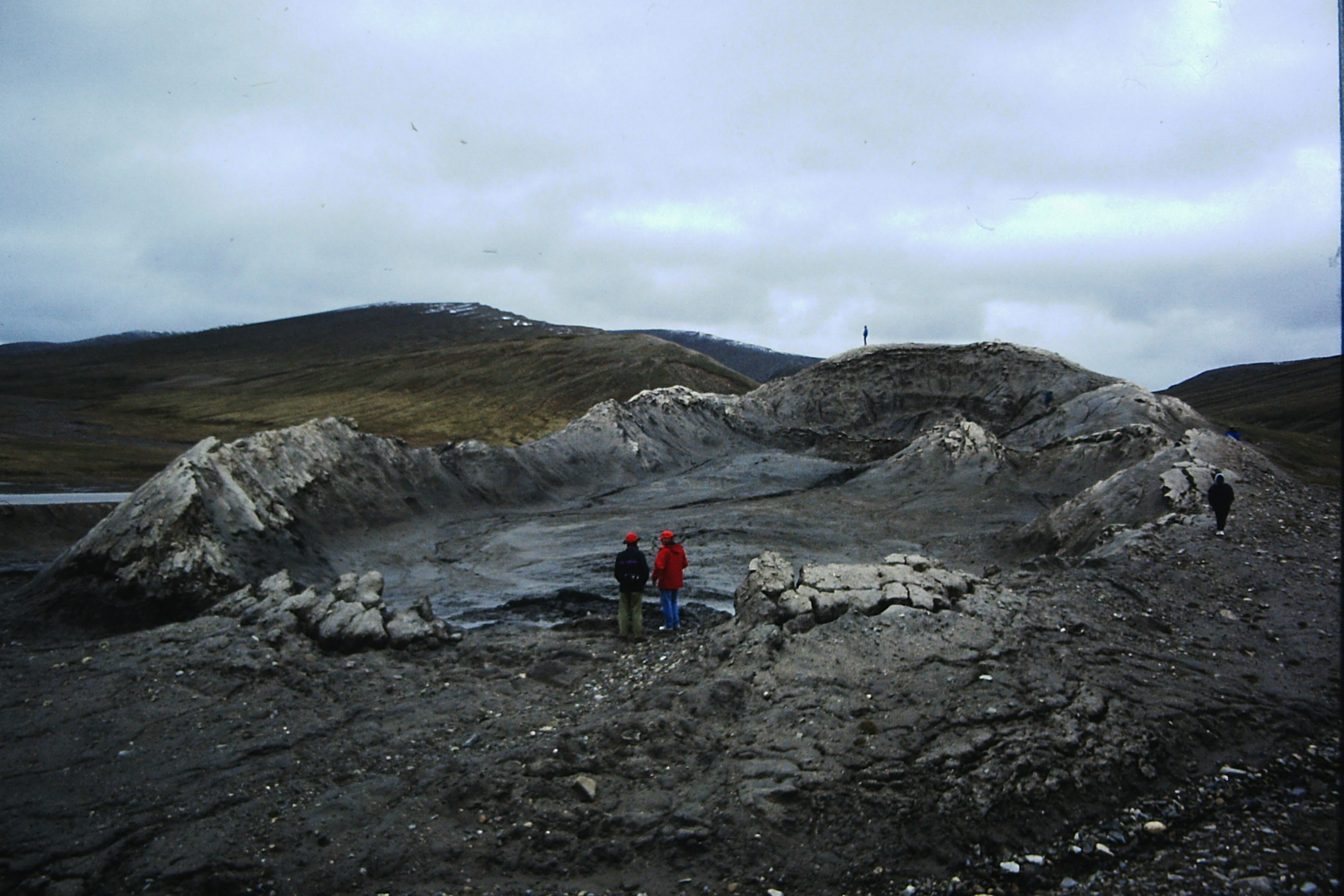
Pingo in Tibet near Tanggula pass

The Qinghai–Tibet Highway reaches its highest elevation of 5,231 meters (17,162 ft) in the Tanggu Pass at 32°52′24″N 91°55′03″E. On August 24, 2005, rail track for the Qinghai–Tibet Railway was completed 28 kilometers (17 mi) to the WNW of the highway, reaching 5,072 meters (16,640 ft) at 33°00′38″N 91°39′51″E. The Tanggula railway station 1 km from this summit is the world's highest at 5,068 meters (16,627 ft), 255 meters (837 ft) higher than that of Ticlio, Peru.

The Qinghai–Tibet railway connects the provincial capitals of Xining to Lhasa. The 1,080-kilometer (670 mi)-long section from Golmud to Lhasa was opened on July 1, 2006. The rail cars are equipped with personal oxygen supplies to prevent altitude sickness.

== Climate ==
Climate data for Zhidamsumo, 33 57N 092 37E, Elevation: 5048m
Month	Jan	Feb	Mar	Apr	May	Jun	Jul	Aug	Sep	Oct	Nov	Dec	Year
Record high °C (°F)	0 (32)	0 (32)	7 (45)	12 (54)	16 (61)	17 (63)	17 (63)	17 (63)	17 (63)	15 (59)	3 (37)	2 (36)	17 (63)
Mean daily maximum °C (°F)	−7 (19)	−5 (23)	−1 (30)	5 (41)	8 (46)	11 (52)	13 (55)	13 (55)	11 (52)	3 (37)	−2 (28)	−6 (21)	3 (37)
Mean daily minimum °C (°F)	−24 (−11)	−24 (−11)	−18 (0)	−12 (10)	−6 (21)	0 (32)	2 (36)	1 (34)	−1 (30)	−10 (14)	−19 (−2)	−24 (−11)	−11 (12)
Record low °C (°F)	−37 (−35)	−31 (−24)	−27 (−17)	−22 (−8)	−13 (9)	−3 (27)	−2 (28)	−3 (27)	−7 (19)	−20 (−4)	−26 (−15)	−32 (−26)	−37 (−35)
Source: Weatherbase
