= Rinconada, Jujuy =

Coordinates: 22°26′S 66°10′W

Rinconada
- Rural municipality and village
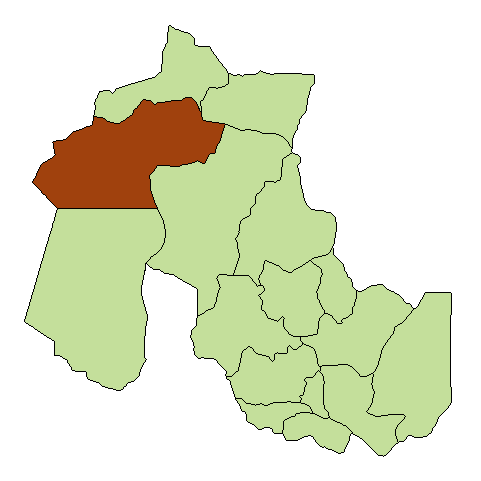
- Country: Argentina
- Province: Jujuy Province
- Department: Rinconada Department

Government
  - Presidente comunal: Liberato Rubén Vilca, PJ
- Elevation: 12,635 ft (3,851 m)

Population (2001)
  - Total: 364
- Time zone: UTC−3 (ART)
- Postal Code: Y4643
- Area code: 03885
- Website: www.rinconada.gov.ar

Rinconada is a rural municipality and village in Jujuy Province in Argentina. It is located in the west of the province of Jujuy and is the head of the Rinconada Department.

Due to its altitude of 3851 meters, it is the highest city of Argentina, taking into account those cities possessing municipal organization.

The village is accessed by a 62 km gravel road (Provincial Route 7) that starts 4 km north of Abra Pampa, on National Route 9.T The Laguna de los Pozuelos, found along this route, contains 150 km^{2} of protected area (Monumento Natural Laguna de los Pozuelos).

== Climate ==
Rinconada has an alpine climate (Köppen ET) with mean temperatures below 10 °C (50 °F) in all months.

Climate data for Rinconada, Jujuy (1972–1996)
Month	Jan	Feb	Mar	Apr	May	Jun	Jul	Aug	Sep	Oct	Nov	Dec	Year
Daily mean °C (°F)	9.4 (48.9)	9.4 (48.9)	9.1 (48.4)	7.0 (44.6)	4.0 (39.2)	2.3 (36.1)	1.7 (35.1)	3.6 (38.5)	5.2 (41.4)	7.4 (45.3)	8.7 (47.7)	9.2 (48.6)	6.4 (43.5)
Average precipitation mm (inches)	162 (6.4)	123 (4.8)	74 (2.9)	7 (0.3)	0 (0)	0 (0)	0 (0)	0 (0)	1 (0.0)	5 (0.2)	23 (0.9)	91 (3.6)	486 (19.1)
Source: Instituto Nacional de Tecnología Agropecuaria

== Population ==
Taking into account its rural population, Rinconada is the most important town in the department with 1,352 inhabitants (INDEC, 2001), representing a decrease of 21.67% compared to 1645 inhabitants (INDEC, 1991) of the previous census.

Its urban, or clustered, population is only 364 inhabitants.
