= Coranzuli =

Coordinates: 23°02′S 66°24′W

- Rural municipality and village
- Interactive map of Coranzuli
- Country: Argentina
- Province: Jujuy Province
- Time zone: UTC−3 (ART)

Coranzuli is a rural municipality and village in Jujuy Province in Argentina.

== Climate ==
Climate data for Coranzuli (1972–1996)
| Month | Jan | Feb | Mar | Apr | May | Jun | Jul | Aug | Sep | Oct | Nov | Dec | Year |
|---|---|---|---|---|---|---|---|---|---|---|---|---|---|
| Daily mean °C (°F) | 9.1 (48.4) | 9.1 (48.4) | 8.6 (47.5) | 6.4 (43.5) | 3.3 (37.9) | 1.6 (34.9) | 0.9 (33.6) | 3.0 (37.4) | 4.8 (40.6) | 6.9 (44.4) | 8.3 (46.9) | 8.9 (48.0) | 5.9 (42.6) |
| Average precipitation mm (inches) | 101 (4.0) | 74 (2.9) | 39 (1.5) | 3 (0.1) | 1 (0.0) | 0 (0) | 0 (0) | 0 (0) | 1 (0.0) | 2 (0.1) | 10 (0.4) | 51 (2.0) | 282 (11.1) |
Source: Instituto Nacional de Tecnología Agropecuaria
