= Haixi Mongol and Tibetan Autonomous Prefecture =

Haixi Prefecture 海西州 · ᠬᠠᠶᠢᠰᠢ ‍ᠶᠢᠨ ᠵᠧᠦ · མཚོ་ནུབ་ཁུལ།
- Autonomous prefecture
- Haixi Mongolian and Tibetan Autonomous Prefecture 海西蒙古族藏族自治州 ᠬᠠᠶᠢᠰᠢ ᠶᠢᠨ ᠮᠣᠩᠭᠣᠯ ᠲᠥᠪᠡᠳ ᠦᠨᠳᠦᠰᠦᠲᠡᠨ ᠦ ᠥᠪᠡᠷᠲᠡᠭᠡᠨ ᠵᠠᠰᠠᠬᠤ ᠵᠧᠦ མཚོ་ནུབ་སོག་རིགས་ཆ་བོད་རིགས་རང་སྐྱོང་ཁུལ།
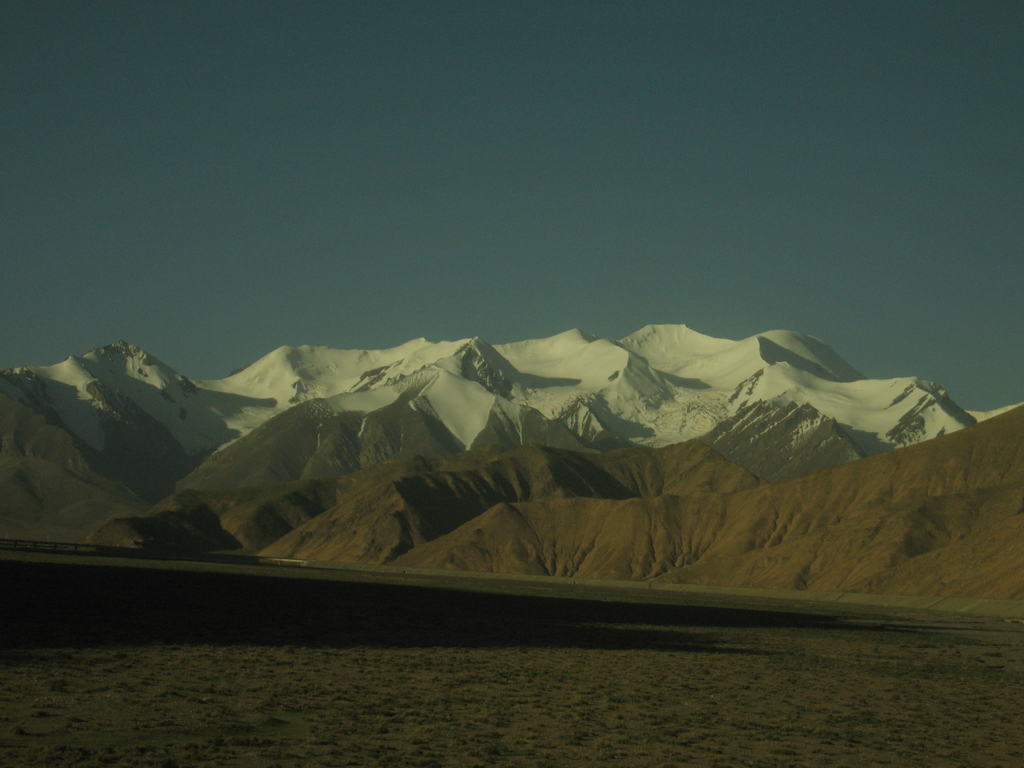
- Tanggula Mountains

- Location of Haixi Prefecture in Qinghai
- Coordinates (Haixi Prefecture government): 37.38°N 97.37°E
- Country: China
- Province: Qinghai
- Prefectural seat: Delingha

Area
  - Total: 325,785 km^{2} (125,786 sq mi)

Population (2017)
  - Total: 515,200
  - Density: 1.581/km^{2} (4.096/sq mi)
  - Major Ethnic Groups: Han−66.01% Hui−13.45% Tibetan−10.93% Mongolians−5.53%

GDP
  - Total: CN¥ 85 billion US$ 12 billion
  - Per capita: CN¥ 179,617; US$ 25,221
- Time zone: UTC+8 (China Standard)
- Postal code: 817000
- Area code(s): 0977/0979; Division code: HXZ
- ISO 3166 code: CN-QH-28
- Website: www.haixi.gov.cn

Haixi Mongol and Tibetan Autonomous Prefecture

Chinese name
- Chinese: 海西蒙古族藏族自治州
Transcriptions
Standard Mandarin
- Hanyu Pinyin: Hǎixī Měnggǔzú Zàngzú Zìzhìzhōu

Tibetan name
- Tibetan: མཚོ་ནུབ་སོག་རིགས་ཆ་བོད་རིགས་རང་སྐྱོང་ཁུལ།
Transcriptions
- Wylie: mtsho-nub sog-rigs dang bod-rigs rang-skyong-khul
- Tibetan Pinyin: Conub Sogrig Poirig Ranggyong Kü

Mongolian name
- Mongolian Cyrillic: Хайши монгол ба Түвдийн өөртөө засах муж (Qayisi-yin Mongɣol Töbed ündüsüten-ü öbertegen zasaqu jvu)
- Mongolian script: ᠬᠠᠶᠢᠰᠢ ᠶᠢᠨ ᠮᠣᠩᠭᠣᠯ ᠲᠥᠪᠡᠳ ᠦᠨᠳᠦᠰᠦᠲᠡᠨ ᠦ ᠥᠪᠡᠷᠲᠡᠭᠡᠨ ᠵᠠᠰᠠᠬᠤ ᠵᠧᠦ
Transcriptions
- SASM/GNC: Qayisi-yin Mongɣol Töbed ündüsüten-ü öbertegen zasaqu jvu

Haixi Mongolian and Tibetan Autonomous Prefecture (Chinese: 海西蒙古族藏族自治州; Mongolian: ᠬᠠᠶᠢᠰᠢ ᠶᠢᠨ ᠮᠣᠩᠭᠣᠯ ᠲᠥᠪᠡᠳ ᠦᠨᠳᠦᠰᠦᠲᠡᠨ ᠦ ᠥᠪᠡᠷᠲᠡᠭᠡᠨ ᠵᠠᠰᠠᠬᠤ ᠵᠧᠦ; Tibetan: མཚོ་ནུབ་སོག་རིགས་ཆ་བོད་རིགས་རང་སྐྱོང་ཁུལ།), locally also known as Qaidam Prefecture (Mongolian: ᠴᠠᠢᠢᠳᠠᠮ; Tibetan: ཚྭ་འདམ།; Chinese: 柴达木), is an autonomous prefecture occupying much of the northern half of (as well as part of the southwest of) Qinghai Province, China. It has an area of 325,785 square kilometres (125,786 sq mi) and its seat is Delingha. The name of the prefecture literally means "west of (Qinghai) Lake."

Geladandong Mountain, the source of the Yangtze River, is located here.

== History ==
After 1949, the People's Government of Dulan County was founded and the area was renamed Dulan Autonomous District (都兰自治区); in 1954, Dulan was renamed Haixi Mongol, Tibetan and Kazakh Autonomous District (海西蒙藏哈萨克族自治区) and in 1955, Haixi Mongol, Tibetan and Kazakh Autonomous Prefecture (海西蒙藏哈萨克族自治州). In 1963, it was renamed "海西蒙古族藏族哈萨克族自治州" (with the "Tibetan" added to the official county name). In 1985, after the Kazakhs had returned to Xinjiang, it was again renamed to Haixi Mongol and Tibetan Autonomous Prefecture.

== Demographics ==
As of the 2017 census, Haixi had 515,200 inhabitants.

The following is a composition of ethnic groups in the prefecture, taken in the 2010 Census.

Ethnicity	Population	Percentage
Han	322,996	66.01%
Hui	65,828	13.45%
Tibetan	53,498	10.93%
Mongolian	27,043	5.53%
Tu/Monguor	9,952	2.03%
Salar	4,665	0.95%
Dongxiang	2,734	0.56%
Manchu	684	0.14%
Tujia	346	0.07%
Kazakh	525	0.11%
Others	1066	0.22%

== Subdivisions ==
Haixi directly governs 3 county-level cities and 3 counties.

Map
Name	Hanzi	Hanyu Pinyin	Mongolian (Transcription from Mongolian)	Tibetan	Wylie Tibetan Pinyin	Population (2010)	Area (km^{2})	Density (/km^{2})
Delingha City (Delhi City)	德令哈市	Délìnghā Shì	ᠳᠡᠯᠡᠬᠡᠢ ᠬᠣᠲᠠ; Delekei qota	གཏེར་ལེན་ཁ་གྲོང་ཁྱེར།	gter len kha grong khyer Dêrlênka Chongkyir	91,855	61,613	1.49
Golmud City (Ge'ermu City)	格尔木市	Gé'ěrmù Shì	ᠭᠤᠤᠯᠮᠤᠳ ᠬᠣᠲᠠ; Ɣool modu qota	ན་གོར་མོ་གྲོང་ཁྱེར།	na gor mo grong khyer Nakormo Chongkyir	215,213	123,460	1.74
Mangnai City (Mangya City)	茫崖市	Mángyá Shì	ᠮᠠᠨᠭᠨᠠᠢ ᠶᠢᠨ ᠬᠣᠲᠠ; Mangnai-yin qota	མང་ནེ་གྲོང་ཁྱེར།	mang ne grong khyer Mangnai Chongkyir	33,451	49,000	0.63
Ulan County (Wulan County)	乌兰县	Wūlán Xiàn	ᠤᠯᠠᠭᠠᠨ ᠰᠢᠶᠠᠨ; Ulaγan siyan	ཝུའུ་ལན་རྫོང་	wu'u lan rdzong Wu'ulain Zong	38,723	10,784	3.59
Dulan County	都兰县	Dūlán Xiàn	ᠳᠤᠯᠠᠭᠠᠨ ᠰᠢᠶᠠᠨ; Dulaγan siyan	ཏུའུ་ལན་རྫོང་	tu'u lan rdzong Tu'ulain Zong	76,623	50,000	1.53
Tianjun County	天峻县	Tiānjùn Xiàn	ᠲᠢᠶᠡᠨ ᠵᠢᠶᠦ᠋ᠨ ᠰᠢᠶᠠᠨ; Tiyen ǰiyün siyan	ཐེན་ཅུན་རྫོང་	then cun rdzong Têncün Zong	33,923	20,000	1.70
Da Qaidam Administrative Zone (Ih'qaidam Administrative Zone)	大柴旦行政委员会	Dàcháidàn Xíngzhèng Wěiyuánhuì	ᠶᠡᠬᠡ ᠴᠠᠢᠢᠳᠠᠮ ᠤᠨ ᠵᠠᠰᠠᠭ ᠵᠠᠬᠢᠷᠠᠭᠠᠨ ᠦ ᠵᠥᠪᠯᠡᠯ; Yeke čayidam-un ǰasaγ ǰaqiraγan-ü ǰöblel	ཚྭ་འདམ་ཆེ་བའི་སྲིད་འཛིན་ཨུ་ཡོན་ལྷན་ཁང་།	tshwa 'dam che ba'i srid 'dzin u yon lhan khang	13,671	34,000	0.40

- The southwestern exclave of the Haixi Prefecture, separated from the rest of the prefecture by a "panhandle" of the Yushu Tibetan Autonomous Prefecture, is the Tanggula Town of Golmud City.

== Gallery ==
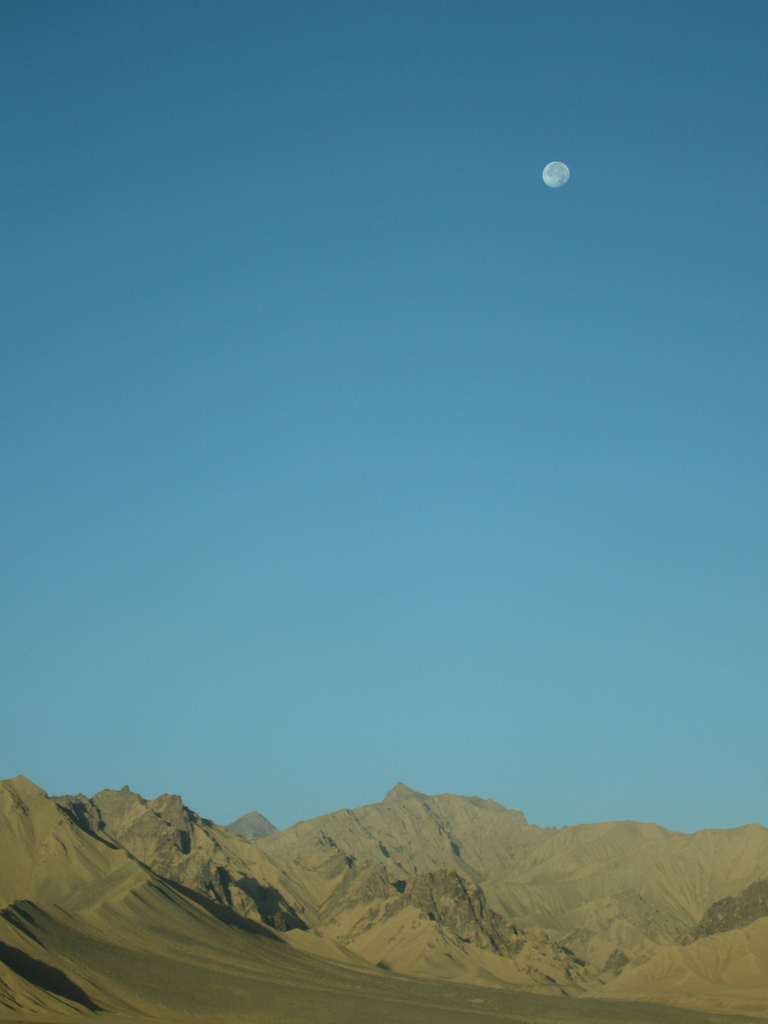
A picture taken in the southwestern part of the prefecture

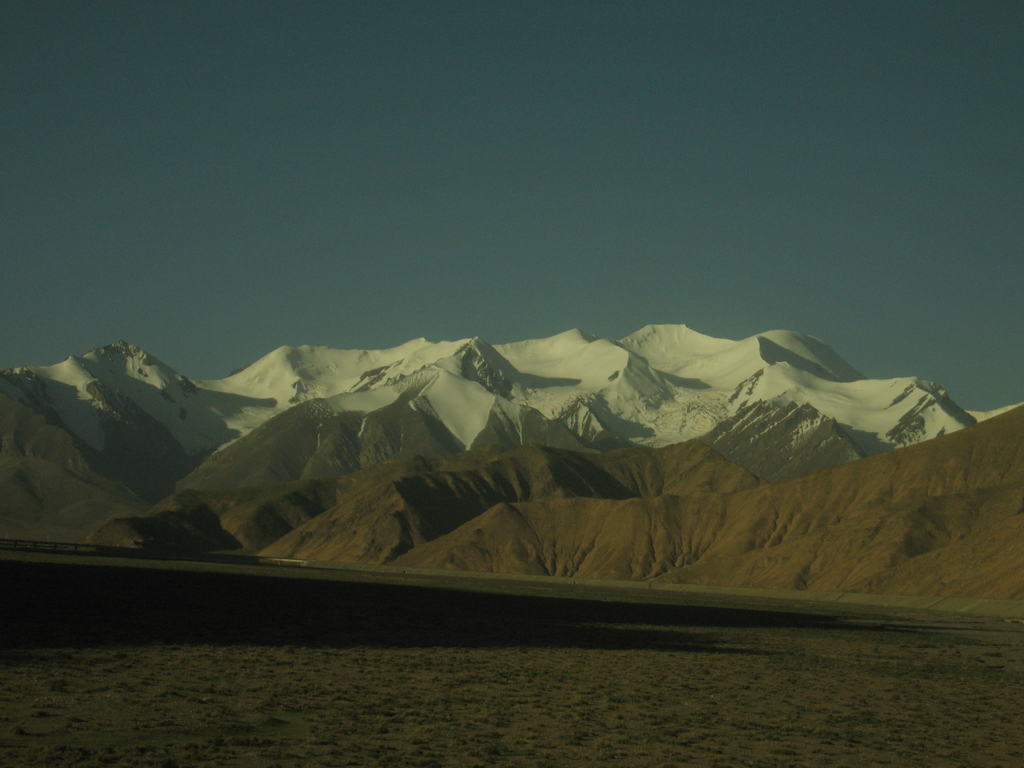
The Qingzang Railway can be seen on the far left

== Notable features ==
- Delingha City
- Qaidam Basin
- Geladandong mountain
- Headwaters of the Yangtze River
- The Baigong Pipes
