= Northwest China administrative division codes of the PRC (Division 6) =

Administrative divisions of Northwest China

List of administrative division codes of the PRC in Division 6 or Northwest China .

== Shaanxi (61) ==
610000	Shaanxi Province 陕西省								
610100	Xi'an city 西安市								
610101	District 市辖区	610102	Xincheng 新城区	610103	Beilin 碑林区	610104	Lianhu 莲湖区		
610101	District 市辖区			610111	Baqiao 灞桥区	610112	Weiyang 未央区	610113	Yanta 雁塔区
610101	District 市辖区	610114	Yanliang 阎良区	610115	Lintong 临潼区	610116	Chang'an 长安区	610117	Gaoling 高陵区
610101	District 市辖区	610118	Huyi 鄠邑区			610120	~~Shi~~ 市区		
610121	~~Chang'an Co.~~ 长安县	610122	Lantian Co. 蓝田县	610123	~~Lintong Co.~~ 临潼县	610124	Zhouzhi Co. 周至县	610125	~~Hu Co.~~ 户县
610126	~~Gaoling Co.~~ 高陵县								
610200	Tongchuan city 铜川市								
610201	District 市辖区	610202	Wangyi 王益区	610203	Yintai 印台区	610204	Yaozhou 耀州区		
610201	District 市辖区					610220	~~Shi~~ 市区		
610221	~~Yao Co.~~ 耀县	610222	Yijun Co. 宜君县						
610300	Baoji city 宝鸡市								
610301	District 市辖区	610302	Weibin 渭滨区	610303	Jintai 金台区	610304	Chencang 陈仓区		
610301	District 市辖区					610320	~~Shi~~ 市区		
610321	~~Baoji Co.~~ 宝鸡县	610322	Fengxiang Co. 凤翔县	610323	Qishan Co. 岐山县	610324	Fufeng Co. 扶风县	610325	~~Wugong Co.~~ 武功县
610326	Mei Co. 眉县	610327	Long Co. 陇县	610328	Qianyang Co. 千阳县	610329	Linyou Co. 麟游县	610330	Feng Co. 凤县
610331	Taibai Co. 太白县								
610400	Xianyang city 咸阳市								
610401	District 市辖区	610402	Qindu 秦都区	610403	Yangling 杨凌区	610404	Weicheng 渭城区		
610421	~~Xingping Co.~~ 兴平县	610422	Sanyuan Co. 三原县	610423	Jingyang Co. 泾阳县	610424	Qian Co. 乾县	610425	Liquan Co. 礼泉县
610426	Yongshou Co. 永寿县	610427	~~Bin Co.~~ 彬县	610428	Changwu Co. 长武县	610429	Xunyi Co. 旬邑县	610430	Chunhua Co. 淳化县
610431	Wugong Co. 武功县								
610481	Xingping city 兴平市	610482	Binzhou city 彬州市						
610500	Weinan city 渭南市								
610501	District 市辖区	610502	Linwei 临渭区	610503	Huazhou 华州区				
610521	~~Hua Co.~~ 华县	610522	Tongguan Co. 潼关县	610523	Dali Co. 大荔县	610524	Heyang Co. 合阳县	610525	Chengcheng Co. 澄城县
610526	Pucheng Co. 蒲城县	610527	Baishui Co. 白水县	610528	Fuping Co. 富平县				
610581	Hancheng city 韩城市	610582	Huayin city 华阴市						
610600	Yan'an city 延安市								
610601	District 市辖区	610602	Baota 宝塔区	610603	Ansai 安塞区				
610621	Yanchang Co. 延长县	610622	Yanchuan Co. 延川县	610623	Zichang Co. 子长县	610624	~~Ansai Co.~~ 安塞县	610625	Zhidan Co. 志丹县
610626	Wuqi Co. 吴起县	610627	Ganquan Co. 甘泉县	610628	Fu Co. 富县	610629	Luochuan Co. 洛川县	610630	Yichuan Co. 宜川县
610631	Huanglong Co. 黄龙县	610632	Huangling Co. 黄陵县						
610700	Hanzhong city 汉中市								
610701	District 市辖区	610702	Hantai 汉台区	610703	Nanzheng 南郑区				
610721	~~Nanzheng Co.~~ 南郑县	610722	Chenggu Co. 城固县	610723	Yang Co. 洋县	610724	Xixiang Co. 西乡县	6107025	Mian Co. 勉县
610726	Ningqiang Co. 宁强县	610727	Lüeyang Co. 略阳县	610728	Zhenba Co. 镇巴县	610729	Liuba Co. 留坝县	610730	Foping Co. 佛坪县
610800	Yulin city 榆林市								
610801	District 市辖区	610802	Yuyang 榆阳区	610803	Hengshan 横山区				
610821	~~Shenmu Co.~~ 神木县	610822	Fugu Co. 府谷县	610823	~~Hengshan Co.~~ 横山县	610824	Jingbian Co. 靖边县	610825	Dingbian Co. 定边县
610826	Suide Co. 绥德县	610827	Mizhi Co. 米脂县	610828	Jia Co. 佳县	610829	Wubu Co. 吴堡县	610830	Qingjian Co. 清涧县
610831	Zizhou Co. 子洲县								
610881	Shenmu city 神木市								
610900	Ankang city 安康市								
610901	District 市辖区	610902	Hanbin 汉滨区						
610921	Hanyin Co. 汉阴县	610922	Shiquan Co. 石泉县	610923	Ningshan Co. 宁陕县	610924	Ziyang Co. 紫阳县	610925	Langao Co. 岚皋县
610926	Pingli Co. 平利县	610927	Zhenping Co. 镇坪县	610928	Xunyang Co. 旬阳县	610929	Baihe Co. 白河县		
611000	Shangluo city 商洛市								
611001	District 市辖区	611002	Shangzhou 商州区						
611021	Luonan Co. 洛南县	611022	Danfeng Co. 丹凤县	611023	Shangnan Co. 商南县	611024	Shanyang Co. 山阳县	611025	Zhen'an Co. 镇安县
611026	Zhashui Co. 柞水县								
612100	~~Weinan Prefecture~~ 渭南地区								
612200	~~Xianyang Prefecture~~ 咸阳地区								
612300	~~Hanzhong Prefecture~~ 汉中地区								
612400	~~Ankang Prefecture~~ 安康地区								
612500	~~Shangluo Prefecture~~ 商洛地区								
612600	~~Yan'an Prefecture~~ 延安地区								
612700	~~Yulin Prefecture~~ 榆林地区								
612800	~~Baoji Prefecture~~ 宝鸡地区								

== Gansu (62) ==
620000	Gansu Province 甘肃省								
620100	Lanzhou city 兰州市								
620101	District 市辖区	620102	Chengguan 城关区	620103	Qilihe 七里河区	620104	Xigu 西固区	620105	Anning 安宁区
620101	District 市辖区			620111	Honggu 红古区	620112	~~Baiyin~~ 白银区		
620101	District 市辖区					620120	~~Shi~~ 市区		
620121	Yongdeng Co. 永登县	620122	Gaolan Co. 皋兰县	620123	Yuzhong Co. 榆中县				
620200	Jiayuguan city 嘉峪关市								
620201	District 市辖区								
620300	Jinchang city 金昌市								
620301	District 市辖区	620302	Jinchuan 金川区						
620301	District 市辖区					620320	~~Shi~~ 市区		
620321	Yongchang Co. 永昌县								
620400	Baiyin city 白银市								
620401	District 市辖区	620402	Baiyin 白银区	620403	Pingchuan 平川区				
620421	Jingyuan Co. 靖远县	620422	Huining Co. 会宁县	620423	Jingtai Co. 景泰县				
620500	Tianshui city 天水市								
620501	District 市辖区	620502	Qinzhou 秦州区	620503	Maiji 麦积区				
620521	Qingshui Co. 清水县	620522	Qin'an Co. 秦安县	620523	Gangu Co. 甘谷县	620524	Wushan Co. 武山县	620525	Zhangjiachuan Co. 张家川县
620600	Wuwei city 武威市								
620601	District 市辖区	620602	Liangzhou 凉州区						
620621	Minqin Co. 民勤县	620622	Gulang Co. 古浪县	620623	Tianzhu Co. 天祝县				
620700	Zhangye city 张掖市								
620701	District 市辖区	620702	Ganzhou 甘州区						
620721	Sunan Co. 肃南县	620722	Minle Co. 民乐县	620723	Linze Co. 临泽县	620724	Gaotai Co. 高台县	620725	Shandan Co. 山丹县
620800	Pingliang city 平凉市								
620801	District 市辖区	620802	Kongtong 崆峒区						
620821	Jingchuan Co. 泾川县	620822	Lingtai Co. 灵台县	620823	Chongxin Co. 崇信县	620824	Huating Co. 华亭县	620825	Zhuanglang Co. 庄浪县
620826	Jingning Co. 静宁县								
620900	Jiuquan city 酒泉市								
620901	District 市辖区	620902	Suzhou 肃州区						
620921	Jinta Co. 金塔县	620922	Guazhou Co. 瓜州县	620923	Subei Co. 肃北县	620924	Akesai Co. 阿克塞县		
620981	Yumen city 玉门市	620982	Dunhuang city 敦煌市						
621000	Qingyang city 庆阳市								
621001	District 市辖区	621002	Xifeng 西峰区						
621021	Qingcheng Co. 庆城县	621022	Huan Co. 环县	621023	Huachi Co. 华池县	621024	Heshui Co. 合水县	621025	Zhengning Co. 正宁县
621026	Ning Co. 宁县	621027	Zhenyuan Co. 镇原县						
621100	Dingxi city 定西市								
621101	District 市辖区	621102	Anding 安定区						
621121	Tongwei Co. 通渭县	621122	Longxi Co. 陇西县	621123	Weiyuan Co. 渭源县	621124	Lintao Co. 临洮县	621125	Zhang Co. 漳县
621126	Min Co. 岷县								
621200	Longnan city 陇南市								
621201	District 市辖区	621202	Wudu 武都区						
621221	Cheng Co. 成县	621222	Wen Co. 文县	621223	Tanchang Co. 宕昌县	621224	Kang Co. 康县	621225	Xihe Co. 西和县
621226	Li Co. 礼县	621227	Hui Co. 徽县	621228	Liangdang Co. 两当县				
622100	~~Jiuquan Prefecture~~ 酒泉地区								
622200	~~Zhangye Prefecture~~ 张掖地区								
622300	~~Wuwei Prefecture~~ 武威地区								
622400	~~Dingxi Prefecture~~ 定西地区								
622500	~~Tianshui Prefecture~~ 天水地区								
622600	~~Longnan Prefecture~~ 陇南地区								
622700	~~Pingliang Prefecture~~ 平凉地区								
622800	~~Qingyang Prefecture~~ 庆阳地区								
622900	Linxia Prefecture 临夏州								
622901	Linxia city 临夏市								
622921	Linxia Co. 临夏县	622922	Kangle Co. 康乐县	622923	Yongjing Co. 永靖县	622924	Guanghe Co. 广河县	622925	Hezheng Co. 和政县
622926	Dongxiang Co. 东乡县	622927	Jishishan Co. 积石山县						
623000	Gannan Prefecture 甘南州								
623001	Hezuo city 合作市								
623021	Lintan Co. 临潭县	623022	Zhouni Co. 卓尼县	623023	Zhugqu Co. 舟曲县	623024	Diebu Co. 迭部县	623025	Maqu Co. 玛曲县
623026	Luqu Co. 碌曲县	623027	Xiahe Co. 夏河县						

== Qinghai (63) ==
630000	Qinghai Province 青海省								
630100	Xining city 西宁市								
630101	District 市辖区	630102	Chengdong 城东区	630103	Chengzhong 城中区	630104	Chengxi 城西区	630105	Chengbei 城北区
630101	District 市辖区			630111	~~Jiao~~ 郊区				
630101	District 市辖区					630120	~~Shi~~ 市区		
630121	Datong Co. 大通县	630122	Huangzhong Co. 湟中县	630123	Huangyuan Co. 湟源县				
630200	Haidong city 海东市								
630201	District 市辖区	630202	Ledu 乐都区	630203	Ping'an 平安区				
630221	~~Ping'an Co.~~ 平安县	630222	Minhe Co. 民和县	630223	Huzhu Co. 互助县	630224	Hualong Co. 化隆县	630225	Xunhua Co. 循化县
632100	~~Haidong Prefecture~~ 海东地区								
632200	Haibei Prefecture 海北州								
632221	Menyuan Co. 门源县	632222	Qilian Co. 祁连县	632223	Haiyan Co. 海晏县	632224	Gangcha Co. 刚察县		
632300	Huangnan Prefecture 黄南州								
632321	Tongren Co. 同仁县	632322	Jainzha Co. 尖扎县	632323	Zeku Co. 泽库县	632324	Henan Co. 河南县		
632400	~~Direct administration~~ 省直辖								
632421	~~Henan Co.~~ 河南县								
632500	Hainan Prefecture 海南州								
632521	Gonghe Co. 共和县	632522	Tongde Co. 同德县	632523	Guide Co. 贵德县	632524	Xinghai Co. 兴海县	632525	Guinan Co. 贵南县
632600	Guoluo Prefecture 果洛州								
632621	Maqin Co. 玛沁县	632622	Baima Co. 班玛县	632623	Gande Co. 甘德县	632624	Dari Co. 达日县	632625	Jiuzhi Co. 久治县
26	Maduo Co. 玛多县								
632700	Yushu Prefecture 玉树州								
632701	Yushu city 玉树市								
632721	~~Yushu Co.~~ 玉树县	632722	Zaduo Co. 杂多县	632723	Chengduo Co. 称多县	632724	Zhiduo Co. 治多县	632725	Nangqian Co. 囊谦县
632726	Qumalai Co. 曲麻莱县								
632800	Haixi Prefecture 海西州								
632801	Ge'ermu city 格尔木市	632802	Delingha city 德令哈市	632803	Mangya city 茫崖市				
632821	Wulan Co. 乌兰县	632822	Dulan Co. 都兰县	632823	Tianjun Co. 天峻县				
632857	~~Dachaidan AZ~~ 大柴旦行政委员会	632858	~~Lenghu AZ~~ 冷湖行政委员会	632859	~~Mangya AZ~~ 茫崖行政委员会				

== Ningxia (64) ==
640000	Ningxia AR 宁夏回族自治区								
640100	Yinchuan city 银川市								
640101	District 市辖区	640102	~~Cheng~~ 城区	640103	~~Xincheng~~ 新城区	640104	Xingqing 兴庆区	640105	Xixia 西夏区
640101	District 市辖区	640106	Jinfeng 金凤区						
640101	District 市辖区			640111	~~Jiao~~ 郊区				
640101	District 市辖区					640120	~~Shi~~ 市区		
640121	Yongning Co. 永宁县	640122	Helan Co. 贺兰县						
640181	Lingwu city 灵武市								
640200	Shizuishan city 石嘴山市								
640201	District 市辖区	640202	Dawukou 大武口区	640203	~~Shizuishan~~ 石嘴山区	640204	~~Shitanjing~~ 石炭井区	640205	Huinong 惠农区
640201	District 市辖区			640211	~~Jiao~~ 郊区				
640201	District 市辖区					640220	~~Shi~~ 市区		
640221	Pingluo Co. 平罗县	640222	~~Taole Co.~~ 陶乐县	640223	~~Huinong Co.~~ 惠农县				
640300	Wuzhong city 吴忠市								
640301	District 市辖区	640302	Litong 利通区	640303	Hongsibu 红寺堡区				
640321	~~Zhongwei Co.~~ 中卫县	640322	~~Zhongning Co.~~ 中宁县	640323	Yanchi Co. 盐池县	640324	Tongxin Co. 同心县		
640381	Qingtongxia city 青铜峡市	640382	~~Lingwu city~~ 灵武市						
640400	Guyuan city 固原市								
640401	District 市辖区	640402	Yuanzhou 原州区						
640421	~~Haiyuan Co.~~ 海原县	640422	Xiji Co. 西吉县	640423	Longde Co. 隆德县	640424	Jingyuan Co. 泾源县	640425	Pengyang Co. 彭阳县
640500	Zhongwei city 中卫市								
640501	District 市辖区	640502	Shapotou 沙坡头区						
640521	Zhongning Co. 中宁县	640522	Haiyuan Co. 海原县						
642100	~~Yinnan Prefecture~~ 银南地区								
642200	~~Guyuan Prefecture~~ 固原地区								
642300	~~Yinbei Prefecture~~ 银北地区								

== Xinjiang (65) ==
650000	Xinjiang AR 新疆维吾尔自治区								
650100	Ürümqi city 乌鲁木齐市								
650101	District 市辖区	650102	Tianshan 天山区	650103	Saybagh 沙依巴克区	650104	Xinshi 新市区	650105	Shuimogou 水磨沟区
650101	District 市辖区	650106	Toutunhe 头屯河区	650107	Dabancheng 达坂城区	650108	~~Dongshan~~ 东山区	650109	Midong 米东区
650101	District 市辖区					650120	~~Shi~~ 市区		
650121	Ürümqi Co. 乌鲁木齐县								
650200	Karamay city 克拉玛依市								
650201	District 市辖区	650202	Dushanzi 独山子区	650203	Karamay 克拉玛依区	650204	Baijiantan 白碱滩区	650205	Urho 乌尔禾区
650300	~~Shihezi city~~ 石河子市								
650400	Turpan city 吐鲁番市								
650401	District 市辖区	650402	Gaochang 高昌区						
650421	Piqan Co. 鄯善县	650422	Toksun Co. 托克逊县						
650500	Hami city 哈密市								
650501	District 市辖区	650502	Yizhou 伊州区						
650521	Barkol Co. 巴里坤县	650522	Yiwu Co. 伊吾县						
652100	~~Turpan Prefecture~~ 吐鲁番地区								
652200	~~Hami Prefecture~~ 哈密地区								
652300	Changji Prefecture 昌吉州								
652301	Changji city 昌吉市	652302	Fukang city 阜康市	652303	~~Miquan city~~ 米泉市				
652321	~~Changji Co.~~ 昌吉县	652322	~~Miquan Co.~~ 米泉县	652323	Hutubi Co. 呼图壁县	652324	Manas Co. 玛纳斯县	652325	Qitai Co. 奇台县
652326	~~Fukang Co.~~ 阜康县	652327	Jimsar Co. 吉木萨尔县	652328	Mori Co. 木垒县				
652400	~~Ili Prefecture~~ 伊犁地区								
652500	~~Tacheng Prefecture~~ 塔城地区								
652600	~~Altay Prefecture~~ 阿勒泰地区								
652700	Bortala Prefecture 博尔塔拉州								
652701	Bole city 博乐市	652702	Alashankou city 阿拉山口市						
652721	~~Bole Co.~~ 博乐县	652722	Jinghe Co. 精河县	652723	Wenquan Co. 温泉县				
652800	Bayingolin Prefecture 巴音郭楞州								
652801	Korla city 库尔勒市								
652821	~~Korla Co.~~ 库尔勒县	652822	Luntai Co. 轮台县	652823	Yuli Co. 尉犁县	652824	Ruoqiang Co. 若羌县	652825	Qiemo Co. 且末县
652826	Yanqi Co. 焉耆县	652827	Hejing Co. 和静县	652828	Hoxud Co. 和硕县	652829	Bohu Co. 博湖县		
652900	Aksu Prefecture 阿克苏地区								
652901	Aksu city 阿克苏市								
652921	~~Aksu Co.~~ 阿克苏县	652922	Wensu Co. 温宿县	652923	Kuchar Co. 库车县	652924	Shayar Co. 沙雅县	652925	Toksu Co. 新和县
652926	Baicheng Co. 拜城县	652927	Uqturpan Co. 乌什县	652928	Awat Co. 阿瓦提县	652929	Kalpin Co. 柯坪县		
653000	Kizilsu Prefecture 克孜勒苏州								
653001	Artux city 阿图什市								
653021	~~Artux Co.~~ 阿图什县	653022	Akto Co. 阿克陶县	653023	Akqi Co. 阿合奇县	653024	Ulugqat Co. 乌恰县		
653100	Kashi Prefecture 喀什地区								
653101	Kashgar city 喀什市								
653121	Shufu Co. 疏附县	653122	Shule Co. 疏勒县	653123	Yengisar Co. 英吉沙县	653124	Poskam Co. 泽普县	653125	Yarkand Co. 莎车县
653126	Kargilik Co. 叶城县	653127	Makit Co. 麦盖提县	653128	Yopurga Co. 岳普湖县	653129	Peyziwat Co. 伽师县	653130	Maralbexi Co. 巴楚县
653131	Taxkorgan Co. 塔什库尔干县								
653200	Hotan Prefecture 和田地区								
653201	Hotan city 和田市								
653221	Hotan Co. 和田县	653222	Karakash Co. 墨玉县	653223	Pishan Co. 皮山县	653224	Lop Co. 洛浦县	653225	Chira Co. 策勒县
653226	Yutian Co. 于田县	653227	Minfeng Co. 民丰县						
653300	~~Shihezi Prefecture~~ 石河子地区								
654000	Ili Prefecture 伊犁州								
654001	~~Kuytun city~~ 奎屯市	654002	Yining city 伊宁市	654003	Kuytun city 奎屯市	654004	Korgas city 霍尔果斯市		
654021	Yining Co. 伊宁县	654022	Qapqal Co. 察布查尔县	654023	Huocheng Co. 霍城县	654024	Gongliu Co. 巩留县	654025	Xinyuan Co. 新源县
654026	Zhaosu Co. 昭苏县	654027	Tekes Co. 特克斯县	654028	Nilka Co. 尼勒克县				
654100	~~Ili Prefecture~~ 伊犁地区								
654200	Tacheng Prefecture 塔城地区								
654201	Tacheng city 塔城市	654202	Wusu city 乌苏市						
654221	Emin Co. 额敏县	654222	~~Wusu Co.~~ 乌苏县	654223	Shawan Co. 沙湾县	654224	Toli Co. 托里县	654225	Yumin Co. 裕民县
654226	Hoboksar Co. 和布克赛尔县								
654300	Altay Prefecture 阿勒泰地区								
654301	Altay city 阿勒泰市								
654321	Burqin Co. 布尔津县	654322	Fuyun Co. 富蕴县	654323	Fuhai Co. 福海县	654324	Habahe Co. 哈巴河县	654325	Qinggil Co. 青河县
654326	Jeminay Co. 吉木乃县								
659000	Direct administration 自治区直辖								
659001	Shihezi city 石河子市	659002	Aral city 阿拉尔市	659003	Tumxuk city 图木舒克市	659004	Wujiaqu city 五家渠市	659005	Beitun city 北屯市
659006	Tiemenguan city 铁门关市	659007	Shuanghe city 双河市	659008	Kokdala city 可克达拉市	659009	Kunyu city 昆玉市		
