= Sanjiangyuan =

Protected area in China

Coordinates: 34°00′33″N 96°12′24″E

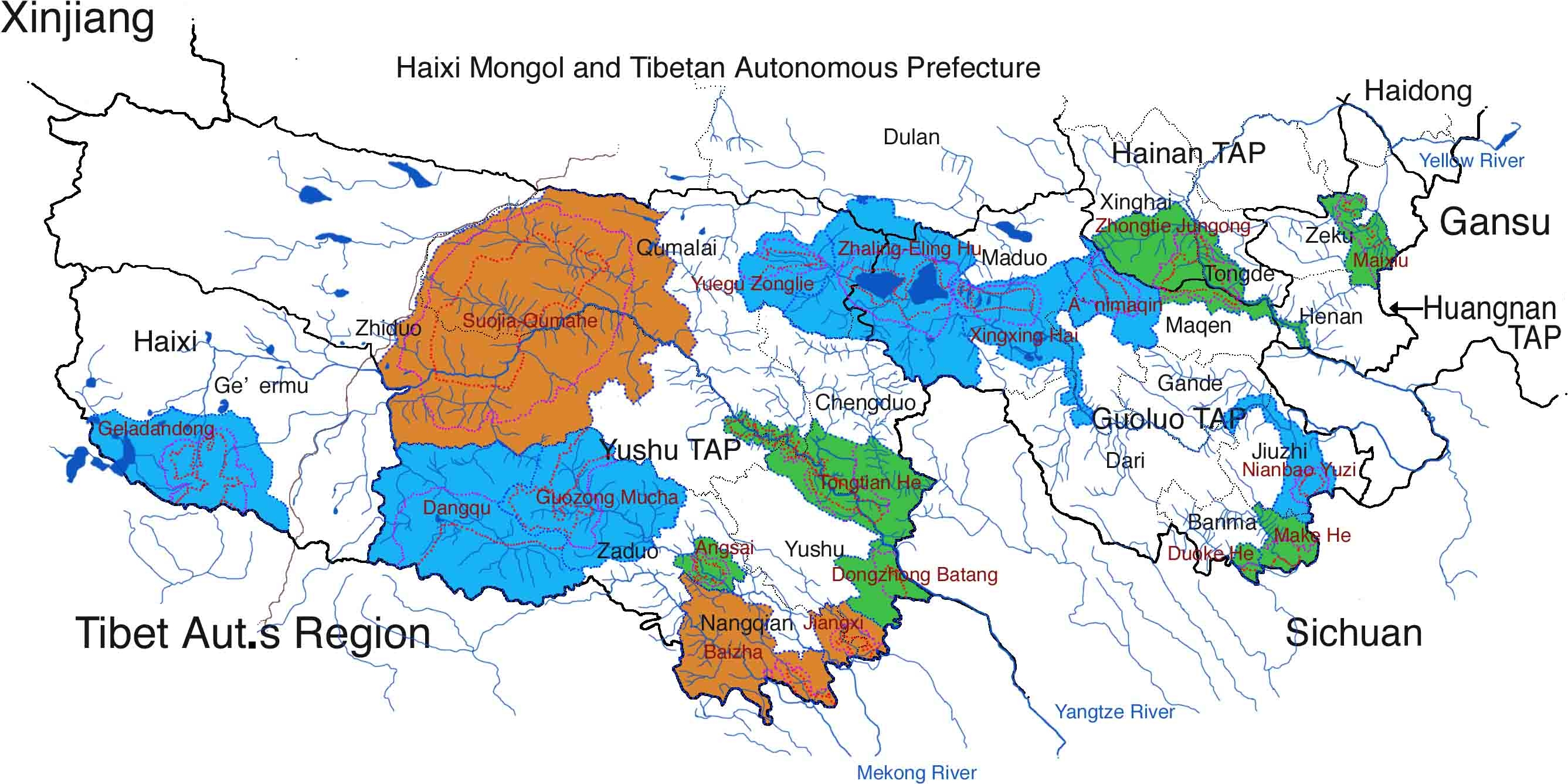
- Sanjiangyuan National Nature Reserve Wetland conservation Wildlife conservation Shrubland or forest conservation

Chinese name
- Traditional Chinese: 三江源國家級自然保護區
- Simplified Chinese: 三江源国家级自然保护区
- Literal meaning: Source of Three Rivers National Nature Reserve
Transcriptions
Standard Mandarin
- Hanyu Pinyin: Sānjiāngyuán Guójiājí Zìrán Bǎohùqū
- IPA: [sántɕjáŋɥɛ̌n kwǒtɕjátɕǐ tsɹ̩̂ɻǎnpàʊxûtɕʰý]

Tibetan name
- Tibetan: གཙང་གསུམ་འབུང་ཁུངས་རང་བྱུང་སྲུང་སྐྱོབ་ཁུལ།
Transcriptions
- Wylie: gtsang gsum 'bung khungs rang byung srung skyob khul/
- THL: tsang sum bung khung rang jung sung kyop khül

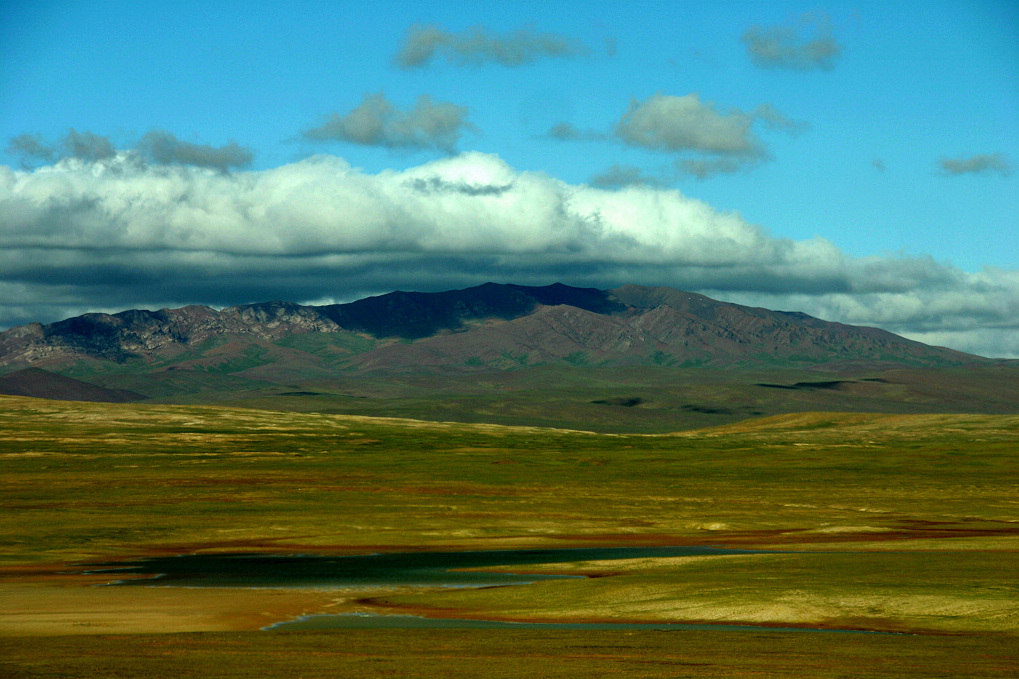
Hoh Xil Nature Reserve in August

The Sanjiangyuan (Chinese: 三江源; lit. 'Source of Three Rivers') is an area of the Tibetan Plateau in Qinghai province, China which contains the headwaters of three great rivers of Asia: the Yellow, the Yangtze, and the Mekong. Parts of the area were protected as the Sanjiangyuan National Nature Reserve (SNNR), also called the Three Rivers Nature Reserve. The reserve consisted of 18 subareas, and each contained three zones which were managed with differing degrees of strictness. In 2015, the Chinese government decided to implement a new national park system; Sanjiangyuan National Park was the first national park to be established in the pilot program in late 2021.

Along with wetland and waters protection, other ecological values, such as grassland, forest, and wildlife enhancement, have also been presented as goals. To advance the goals of the SNNR uncontrolled or poorly managed mining, logging, hunting, and grazing have been curtailed. Foreign and other mining firms have replaced the uncontrolled miners, trees have been planted, and measures have been taken to protect endangered species. To protect the grasslands, pastoralists are not permitted to graze their animals in designated 'core zones' (see below), and grazing is supervised elsewhere in the SNNR. In addition, residents have been resettled from core zones and other grassland areas of the SNNR, and rangeland has been fenced and is in the process of being privatized throughout the Sanjiangyuan Area.

== Sanjiangyuan Area ==
The Sanjiangyuan Area covers the southern and eastern parts of Qinghai and has an area of about 363,000 km^{2}, 50.4% of Qinghai. Included in it wholly or partially are 18 counties of the four Tibetan Autonomous Prefectures Yushu, Guoluo, Hainan, and Huangnan, and Haixi Mongol and Tibetan Autonomous Prefecture. The Sanjiangyuan Area's population is about 600,000, 90% of which are Tibetan. 70% of the Sanjiangyuan Area's population are considered to be 'impoverished', with the average income of about 2000 RMB (roughly $300) per person/year. Since animal husbandry is the primary source of income, and many people are nomadic, this figure does not reflect the actual standard of living in a largely non-cash economy. The Sanjiangyuan Area in general has no special legal status, and the term is used to indicate the region in which the three rivers arise, and the Sanjiangyuan National Park exists.

The Sanjiangyuan National Nature Reserve (SNNR) was a subarea of the Sanjiangyuan Area which covered an area of about 152,300 km^{2}, 21% of Qinghai, 42% of the Sanjiangyuan Area. It was larger than England and Wales combined. About 200,000 people traditionally live within the area that was covered by the SNNR. Resettlement efforts were made to resettle all nomads in Qinghai by 2011, but it is unclear as to the outcome of those efforts. The State Forestry Administration and the Qinghai government legally established the SNNR in May 2000. Its Management Bureau was founded September 2001, and the SNNR obtained State-level (national) status January 2003. The Management Bureau is in Xining, and is under the Qinghai Forest Bureau. Mr. Wang Zhibao, Director of the State Forest Administration, has said the goals of the nature reserve protect the Qinghai-Tibet Plateau ecosystem, with a focus on alpine swamp meadow and the natural habitat of wildlife in the Sanjiangyuan Area.

The SNNR consisted of 18 subareas. These are of three types: wetland conservation (8 subareas), wildlife conservation (3 subareas), and shrubland or forest conservation (7 subareas). Each SNNR subarea had three zones: a core zone; a buffer zone; and a multiple-use experimental zone. Residents from degraded areas are being resettled. The core zone was supposed to be strictly managed with no grazing and measures to protect endangered species. All development and use were prohibited. It was a 'no man's zone', with all its residents resettled elsewhere. The buffer zone promoted conservation but allowed limited and rotational grazing. The multiple-use experimental zones were also used for scientific investigations, eco-tourism, and other green industries.

The Sanjiangyuan National Park, as of 2019, consists of an area of 123,100 km^{2}, which is only slightly smaller than England. It encompasses most of the southern half of Qinghai Province.

The predecessors to the zones on the SNNR map may be grazing zones which were part of the tuimu huancao, 'converting pastures to grasslands' program, which got its start in 2000. In this program there were three types of zones to address the problem of degraded pastures: zones in which grazing was permanently banned, zones in which grazing was to be banned for typically three to ten years, and zones which were seasonally closed to grazing or allowed seasonal rotational grazing. The implementation of four kinds of zones in Yushu and Guoluo prefectures also seem to provide a precedent, if these are not the SNNR map's zones themselves described differently. The first two of these zones correspond to what is referred to on the SNNR map as the 'core zone', the third to the 'buffer zone', and the fourth to the 'experimental zone'. In the third (i.e. buffer) zone there was to be a reduction in grazing or a ban on grazing for five or ten years, and in the fourth (i.e. experimental) zone there was to be rotational grazing to capacity.

Since the government also has a poverty reduction and a major project (e.g. dams) resettlement program, and plans to resettle all nomads by 2011, residents from the buffer and the experimental zones may be resettled under these programs rather than the ecological resettlement program.

The absolute and relative sizes, and the populations before resettlement, of the zones are:

	Core	Buffer	Experimental
Area	31,218 km^{2}	39,242 km^{2}	81,882 km^{2}
% Total	20.5%	25.8%	53.7%
Population	40,000+	50,000+	120,000

The boundaries and characters of the zones are likely open to negotiation. For example, the Canadian mining company Inter-Citic's Dachang gold prospect is in either a buffer or experimental zone (or both).

In addition, only the 3 functional subareas of the SNNR, those with protection stations, have definite boundaries. The other 15 subareas are more a plan for their final delineation. The three functional subareas are A'nimaqin, Suojia-Qumahe (2 stations, one in each Qumahe and Suojia), and Tongtian He.

== Townships affected ==
The SNNR is entirely in Qinghai. The following table lists the 71 townships which are wholly or partially in the SNNR.

Prefecture	County	Townships
Yushu	Yushu	Xiaosuomang, Zhongda, Anchong, Haxiu, Batang
Yushu	Nangqên (Nangqian)	Maozhuang, Ninagla, Baizha, Jinisai, Dongba, Gayong, Jiequ, Zhuoxiao
Yushu	Zadoi (Zaduo)	Chari, Jieduo, Mouyun, Zhaqing, Aduo, Ansai
Yushu	Zhidoi (Zhiduo)	Soujia, Lixin, Zhahe
Yushu	Qumarleb (Qumalai)	Maduo, Bagan, Dongfeng, Qumahe, Yege
Yushu	Chindu (Chengduo)	Labu, Chengwen, Gaduo, Xiewu, Zaduo, Zhengqing
Golog (Guoluo)	Maqên (Maqin)	XueShan, Xiadawu, Lajia, Dongqingou, Dawu, Youyun, Dangluo, Changmahe
Golog (Guoluo)	Madoi (Maduo)	Heihe, Huanghe, Huashixia, Zhalinghu
Golog (Guoluo)	Darlag (Dari)	Tehetu
Golog (Guoluo)	Gadê (Gande)	Xiazangke, Ganglong
Golog (Guoluo)	Baima (Banma)	Zhiqing, Ya’rtang, Denta, Mouba, Jiangri Tang
Golog (Guoluo)	Jigzhi (Jiuzhi)	Suhurima, Wasai, Mentang, Kansai, Riyu
Hainan	Xinghai	Zhongtie, Longzang, Wenquan, Qushian
Hainan	Tongde	Xiuma, Tanggan, Gumang
Huangnan	Zeku	Duohemao, Duofudun, Xibusha
Huangnan	Henan	Ningmute
Haixi	Golmud (Ge'ermu)	Tanggulashan
Haixi	Dulan	Balong

== Conservation subareas ==
This table lists the names of the 18 conservation subareas and the counties they wholly or partially occupy.

Type	Name	Prefecture	Counties
Wetland	Xingxing Hai	Guoluo	Maduo, Dari, Maqen
Wetland	Nianbao Yuzi	Guoluo	Jiuzhi, Gande, Banma
Wetland	Dangqu	Yushu	Zaduo
Wetland	Geladandong	Haixi	Ge’ermu
Wetland	A’nimaqin	Guoluo	Maqen, Maduo
Wetland	Yuegu Zhonglie	Yushu	Qumalai
Wetland	Zhaling-Eling Hu	Guoluo, Yushu, Haixi	Maduo, Qumalai, Chengduo, Dulan
Wetland	Guozong Mucha	Yushu	Zaduo
Wildlife	Suojia-Qumahe	Yushu	Zhiduo, Qumalai
Wildlife	Jiangxi	Yushu	Yushu, Nangqian
Wildlife	Baizha	Yushu	Nangqian
Shrubland/forest	Tongtian He	Yushu	Chengduo, Yushu, Qumalai, Zhiduo
Shrubland/forest	Dongzhong Batang	Yushu	Yushu
Shrubland/forest	Angsai	Yushu	Zaduo
Shrubland/forest	Zhongtie Jungong	Hainan, Huangnan, Guoluo	Xinghai, Tongde, Henan, Maqen
Shrubland/forest	Duoke He	Guoluo	Banma
Shrubland/forest	Maixiu	Huangnan	Zeku
Shrubland/forest	Make He	Guoluo	Banma

== Fauna ==
=== Birds ===
Tibetan snowcock, Tibetan partridge, mute swan, greylag goose, bar-headed goose, ruddy shelduck, mallard, Eastern spot-billed duck, common teal, common pochard, common merganser, hoopoe, Pacific swift, little owl, hill pigeon, red collared dove, black-necked crane, Tibetan sandgrouse, Chinese monal, common redshank, green sandpiper, common sandpiper, ibisbill, little ringed plover, lesser sand plover, Pallas's gull, brown-headed gull, common tern, black kite, bearded vulture, Himalayan vulture, cinereous vulture, common buzzard, upland buzzard, steppe eagle, golden eagle, greater spotted eagle, eastern imperial eagle, Pallas fish eagle, common kestrel, merlin, saker falcon, peregrine falcon, great crested grebe, little egret, grey heron, black stork, ground tit, red-billed chough, common raven, Sichuan jay, white-throated dipper, black redstart, Hodgson's redstart, Daurian redstart, white-winged redstart, white-capped water redstart, common starling, wallcreeper, sand martin, Asian house martin, white-browed tit warbler, Tibetan lark, Oriental skylark, horned lark, house sparrow, Eurasian tree sparrow, white-winged snowfinch, Tibetan snowfinch, white-rumped snowfinch, rufous-necked snowfinch, plain-backed snowfinch, white wagtail, citrine wagtail, Richard's pipit, alpine accentor, robin accentor, brown accentor, twite, Brandt's mountain finch, common rosefinch, streaked rosefinch, great rosefinch, red-fronted rosefinch.

=== Mammals ===
Himalayan wolf, red fox, Tibetan sand fox, Tibetan blue bear, European otter, Siberian weasel, Steppe polecat, European badger, Pallas cat, Amur leopard, Eurasian lynx, Snow leopard, Kiang, Alpine musk deer, wild yak, Chiru, Tibetan gazelle, Thorold's deer, blue sheep, argali, Himalayan marmot, Tibetan dwarf hamster, Plateau pika, large-eared pika, Glover's pika, woolly hare.
