= List of administrative divisions of Qinghai =

Qinghai Province
- Province
- Capital: Xining

Prefecture-level divisions
- Prefectural cities: 2
- Autonomous prefectures: 6

County level divisions
- County cities: 5
- Counties: 25
- Autonomous counties: 7
- Districts: 7

Township level divisions
- Towns: 115
- Townships: 253
- Ethnic townships: 30
- Subdistricts: 31

Villages level divisions
- Communities: 476
- Administrative villages: 4,146
- The administrative committees also are not counted.

Qinghai, a province of the People's Republic of China, is made up of the following administrative divisions.

== Administrative divisions ==
All of these administrative divisions are explained in greater detail at Administrative divisions of the People's Republic of China. This chart lists all prefecture-level and county-level divisions of Qinghai.

Prefecture level	County Level				
Prefecture level	Name	Chinese	Hanyu Pinyin	Division code	
Xining city 西宁市; Xīníng Shì (Capital) (6301 / XNN)	Chengdong District	城东区	Chéngdōng Qū	630102	CDQ
Xining city 西宁市; Xīníng Shì (Capital) (6301 / XNN)	Chengzhong District	城中区	Chéngzhōng Qū	630103	CZQ
Xining city 西宁市; Xīníng Shì (Capital) (6301 / XNN)	Chengxi District	城西区	Chéngxī Qū	630104	CXQ
Xining city 西宁市; Xīníng Shì (Capital) (6301 / XNN)	Chengbei District	城北区	Chéngběi Qū	630105	CBE
Xining city 西宁市; Xīníng Shì (Capital) (6301 / XNN)	Huangzhong District	湟中区	Huángzhōng Qū	630106	
Xining city 西宁市; Xīníng Shì (Capital) (6301 / XNN)	Datong County (Note: Conventional name: Datong Hui and Tu Autonomous County; Chinese: 大通回族土族自治县; pinyin: Dàtōng Huízú Tǔzú Zìzhìxiàn)	大通县	Dàtōng Xiàn	630121	DAT
Xining city 西宁市; Xīníng Shì (Capital) (6301 / XNN)	Huangyuan County	湟源县	Huángyuán Xiàn	630123	HYU
Haidong city 海东市; Hǎidōng Shì (6302 / HDI)	Ledu District	乐都区	Lèdū Qū	630202	LDA
Haidong city 海东市; Hǎidōng Shì (6302 / HDI)	Ping'an District	平安区	Píng'ān Qū	630203	PIA
Haidong city 海东市; Hǎidōng Shì (6302 / HDI)	Minhe County (Note: Conventional name: Minhe Hui and Tu Autonomous County; Chinese: 民和回族土族自治县; pinyin: Mínhé Huízú Tǔzú Zìzhìxiàn)	民和县	Mínhé Xiàn	630222	MHE
Haidong city 海东市; Hǎidōng Shì (6302 / HDI)	Huzhu County (Note: Conventional name: Huzhu Tu Autonomous County; Chinese: 互助土族自治县; pinyin: Hùzhù Tǔzú Zìzhìxiàn)	互助县	Hùzhù Xiàn	630223	HZT
Haidong city 海东市; Hǎidōng Shì (6302 / HDI)	Hualong County (Note: Conventional name: Hualong Hui Autonomous County; Chinese: 化隆回族自治县; pinyin: Huàlóng Huízú Zìzhìxiàn)	化隆县	Huàlóng Xiàn	630224	HLO
Haidong city 海东市; Hǎidōng Shì (6302 / HDI)	Xunhua County (Note: Conventional name: Xunhua Salar Autonomous County; Chinese: 循化撒拉族自治县; pinyin: Xúnhuà Sǎlāzú Zìzhìxiàn)	循化县	Xúnhuà Xiàn	630225	XUH
Haibei Prefecture (Note: Conventional name: Haibei Tibetan Autonomous Prefecture; Chinese: 海北藏族自治州; pinyin: Hǎiběi Zàngzú Zìzhìzhōu) 海北州; Hǎiběi Zhōu (6322 / HBZ)	Menyuan County (Note: Conventional name: Menyuan Hui Autonomous County; Chinese: 门源回族自治县; pinyin: Ményuán Huízú Zìzhìxiàn)	门源县	Ményuán Xiàn	632221	MYU
Haibei Prefecture 海北州; Hǎiběi Zhōu (6322 / HBZ)	Qilian County	祁连县	Qílián Xiàn	632222	QLN
Haibei Prefecture 海北州; Hǎiběi Zhōu (6322 / HBZ)	Haiyan County	海晏县	Hǎiyàn Xiàn	632223	HIY
Haibei Prefecture 海北州; Hǎiběi Zhōu (6322 / HBZ)	Gangcha County	刚察县	Gāngchá Xiàn	632224	GAN
Huangnan Prefecture (Note: Conventional name: Huangnan Tibetan Autonomous Prefecture; Chinese: 黄南藏族自治州; pinyin: Huángnán Zàngzú Zìzhìzhōu) 黄南州; Huángnán Zhōu (6323 / HNZ)	Tongren city	同仁市	Tóngrén Shì	632301	
Huangnan Prefecture 黄南州; Huángnán Zhōu (6323 / HNZ)	Jianzha County	尖扎县	Jiānzhā Xiàn	632322	JAI
Huangnan Prefecture 黄南州; Huángnán Zhōu (6323 / HNZ)	Zeku County	泽库县	Zékù Xiàn	632323	ZEK
Huangnan Prefecture 黄南州; Huángnán Zhōu (6323 / HNZ)	Henan County (Note: Conventional name: Henan Mongol Autonomous County; Chinese: 河南蒙古族自治县; pinyin: Hénán Měnggǔzú Zìzhìxiàn)	河南县	Hénán Xiàn	632324	HNM
Hainan Prefecture (Note: Conventional name: Hainan Tibetan Autonomous Prefecture; Chinese: 海南藏族自治州; pinyin: Hǎinán Zàngzú Zìzhìzhōu) 海南州; Hǎinán Zhōu (6325 / HNN)	Gonghe County	共和县	Gònghé Xiàn	632521	GHE
Hainan Prefecture 海南州; Hǎinán Zhōu (6325 / HNN)	Tongde County	同德县	Tóngdé Xiàn	632522	TDX
Hainan Prefecture 海南州; Hǎinán Zhōu (6325 / HNN)	Guide County	贵德县	Guìdé Xiàn	632523	GID
Hainan Prefecture 海南州; Hǎinán Zhōu (6325 / HNN)	Xinghai County	兴海县	Xīnghǎi Xiàn	632524	XHA
Hainan Prefecture 海南州; Hǎinán Zhōu (6325 / HNN)	Guinan County	贵南县	Guìnán Xiàn	632525	GNN
Guoluo Prefecture (Note: Conventional name: Golog Tibetan Autonomous Prefecture; Chinese: 果洛藏族自治州; pinyin: Guǒluò Zàngzú Zìzhìzhōu) 果洛州; Guǒluò Zhōu (6326 / GOL)	Maqin County	玛沁县	Mǎqìn Xiàn	632621	MAQ
Guoluo Prefecture 果洛州; Guǒluò Zhōu (6326 / GOL)	Baima County	班玛县	Bānmǎ Xiàn	632622	BMX
Guoluo Prefecture 果洛州; Guǒluò Zhōu (6326 / GOL)	Gande County	甘德县	Gāndé Xiàn	632623	GAD
Guoluo Prefecture 果洛州; Guǒluò Zhōu (6326 / GOL)	Dari County	达日县	Dárì Xiàn	632624	TAR
Guoluo Prefecture 果洛州; Guǒluò Zhōu (6326 / GOL)	Jiuzhi County	久治县	Jiǔzhì Xiàn	632625	JUZ
Guoluo Prefecture 果洛州; Guǒluò Zhōu (6326 / GOL)	Maduo County	玛多县	Mǎduō Xiàn	632626	MAD
Yushu Prefecture (Note: Conventional name: Yushu Tibetan Autonomous Prefecture; Chinese: 玉树藏族自治州; pinyin: Yùshù Zàngzú Zìzhìzhōu) 玉树州; Yùshù Zhōu (6327 / YSZ)	Yushu city	玉树市	Yùshù Shì	632701	YSC
Yushu Prefecture 玉树州; Yùshù Zhōu (6327 / YSZ)	Zaduo County	杂多县	Záduō Xiàn	632722	ZAD
Yushu Prefecture 玉树州; Yùshù Zhōu (6327 / YSZ)	Chengduo County	称多县	Chēngduō Xiàn	632723	CHI
Yushu Prefecture 玉树州; Yùshù Zhōu (6327 / YSZ)	Zhiduo County	治多县	Zhìduō Xiàn	632724	ZHI
Yushu Prefecture 玉树州; Yùshù Zhōu (6327 / YSZ)	Nangqian County	囊谦县	Nángqiān Xiàn	632725	NQN
Yushu Prefecture 玉树州; Yùshù Zhōu (6327 / YSZ)	Qumalai County	曲麻莱县	Qūmálái Xiàn	632726	QUM
Haixi Prefecture (Note: Conventional name: Haixi Mongol and Tibetan Autonomous Prefecture; Chinese: 海西蒙古族藏族自治州; pinyin: Hǎixī Měnggǔzú Zàngzú Zìzhìzhōu) 海西州; Hǎixī Zhōu (6328 / HXZ)	Ge'ermu city	格尔木市	Gé'ěrmù Shì	632801	GOS
Haixi Prefecture 海西州; Hǎixī Zhōu (6328 / HXZ)	Delingha city	德令哈市	Délìnghā Shì	632802	DEL
Haixi Prefecture 海西州; Hǎixī Zhōu (6328 / HXZ)	Mangya city	茫崖市	Mángyá Shì	632803	
Haixi Prefecture 海西州; Hǎixī Zhōu (6328 / HXZ)	Wulan County	乌兰县	Wūlán Xiàn	632821	ULA
Haixi Prefecture 海西州; Hǎixī Zhōu (6328 / HXZ)	Dulan County	都兰县	Dūlán Xiàn	632822	DUL
Haixi Prefecture 海西州; Hǎixī Zhōu (6328 / HXZ)	Tianjun County	天峻县	Tiānjùn Xiàn	632823	TJN
Haixi Prefecture 海西州; Hǎixī Zhōu (6328 / HXZ)	Dachaidan Administrative Zone (Note: The administrative zones are not standard units of local government, though they do function as such. The administrative zones are not formal administrative subdivisions recognized by the Ministry of Civil Affairs. Nominally part of Delingha City.)	大柴旦行政区	Dàcháidàn Xíngzhèngqū	632857	

== Administrative divisions history ==
=== Recent changes in administrative divisions ===
Date	Before	After	Note	Reference
1980-01-09	parts of Haidong Prefecture	Xining (PL-City)	transferred	
1980-01-09	↳ parts of Huangzhong County	↳ Jiao District, Xining	transferred & established	
1983-01-18	all Province-controlled city (P-City) → Prefecture-level city (PL-City)			Civil Affairs Announcement
1983-01-18	all Prefecture-controlled city (PC-City) → County-level city (CL-City)			Civil Affairs Announcement
1984-05-01	Haixi Prefecture (Aut.) prefectural-controlled	Mangya AZ	established	
1985-??-??	provincial-controlled	Huangnan Prefecture (Aut.)	transferred	
1985-??-??	↳ Henan County (Aut.)	↳ Henan County (Aut.)	transferred	
1985-04-24	Haixi Prefecture (Aut.)	Haixi Prefecture (Aut.)	removed Kazakh Aut.	
1985-11-06	Minhe County	Minhe County (Aut.)	reorganized	
1985-11-06	Datong County	Datong County (Aut.)	reorganized	
1986-03-05	parts of Chengxi District	Chengbei District	established	
1986-03-05	Jiao District, Xining	Chengbei District	merged into	
1986-03-05	Jiao District, Xining	Chengdong District	merged into	
1986-03-05	Jiao District, Xining	Chengzhong District	merged into	
1986-03-05	Jiao District, Xining	Chengxi District	merged into	
1988-04-19	parts of Wulan County	Delingha (CL-City)	established	
1988-04-19	parts of Mangya AZ	Delingha (CL-City)	merged	
1989-??-??	provincial-controlled	Haibei Prefecture (Aut.)	transferred	
1989-??-??	↳ Kuang District Office	↳ Haiyan County	merged into	
1992-??-??	parts of Mangya AZ	Dachaidan AZ	established	
1992-??-??	parts of Mangya AZ	Lenghu AZ	established	
1999-12-05	parts of Haidong Prefecture	Xining (PL-City)	transferred	State Council [1999]142
1999-12-05	↳ Huangzhong County	↳ Huangzhong County	transferred	State Council [1999]142
1999-12-05	↳ Huangyuan County	↳ Huangyuan County	transferred	State Council [1999]142
2013-02-08	Haidong Prefecture	Haidong (PL-City)	reorganized	State Council [2013]23
2013-02-08	Ledu County	Ledu District	reorganized	State Council [2013]23
2013-07-03	Yushu County	Yushu (CL-City)	reorganized	Civil Affairs [2013]219
2015-02-16	Ping'an County	Ping'an District	reorganized	State Council [2015]38
2018-02-22	Mangya AZ	Mangya (CL-City)	reorganized	Civil Affairs [2018]48
2018-02-22	Lenghu AZ	Mangya (CL-City)	merged	Civil Affairs [2018]48
2019-11-06	Huangzhong County	Huangzhong District	reorganized	State Council [2019]106
2020-07-??	Tongren County	Tongren (CL-City)	reorganized	

== Population composition ==
=== Prefectures ===
Prefecture	2010	2000
Haixi	489,338	369,136
Haibei	273,304	276,723
Xining	2,208,708	1,979,200
Haidong	1,396,846	1,520,074
Hainan	441,689	401,743
Huangnan	256,716	225,462
Yushu	378,439	268,825
Guoluo	181,682	140,397

=== Counties ===
Name	Prefecture	2010
Chengdong	Xining	359,688
Chengzhong	Xining	296,987
Chengxi	Xining	242,627
Chengbei	Xining	299,002
Huangyuan	Xining	437,835
Huangzhong	Xining	136,632
Datong	Xining	435,937
Ledu	Haidong	260,185
Ping'an	Haidong	102,975
Minhe	Haidong	350,118
Huzhu	Haidong	356,437
Hualong	Haidong	203,317
Xunhua	Haidong	123,814
Qilian	Haibei	13,789
Haiyan	Haibei	11,497
Gangcha	Haibei	11,473
Menyuan	Haibei	37,595
Gonghe	Hainan	122,966
Tongde	Hainan	64,367
Guide	Hainan	101,771
Xinghai	Hainan	76,025
Guinan	Hainan	76,560
Ge'ermu	Haixi	215,213
Delingha	Haixi	78,184
Wulan	Haixi	38,273
Dulan	Haixi	76,623
Tianjun	Haixi	33,923
Mangya	Haixi	31,017
Dachaidan	Haixi	13,671
Lenghu	Haixi	2,434
Tongren	Huangnan	92,601
Jianzha	Huangnan	55,325
Zeku	Huangnan	69,416
Henan	Huangnan	39,374
Maqin	Golog	51,245
Baima	Golog	27,185
Gande	Golog	34,840
Dari	Golog	30,995
Jiuzhi	Golog	26,081
Maduo	Golog	11,336
Yushu	Yushu	120,447
Zaduo	Yushu	58,268
Chengduo	Yushu	55,619
Zhiduo	Yushu	30,037
Nangqian	Yushu	85,825
Qumalai	Yushu	28,243

== Drafted and proposed cities ==
Qinghai is planning to re-organise the following administrative divisions:

County-level cities

- Gonghe ← Gonghe County
- Guide ← Guide County
- Haiyan ← Haiyan County
- Qaidam (柴达木市) ← Da Qaidam and Delingha
- Maqin ← Maqin County

== See also ==
- List of township-level divisions of Qinghai, for towns and townships
