= List of prisons in Qinghai =

This is a list of prisons within Qinghai province of the People's Republic of China.

== Xining ==
=== Prison ===
Name	Name	City/county/district	Village/town	Established	Notes
Dongchuan Prison	Qinghai New-Model Building Materials Factory	Chengdong District, Xining		1951	Tashi Wangchuk (activist), a Tibetan Who Spoke Out for Language Rights Is Freed From Chinese Prison
Jianxin Prison	Qinghai Sanli Construction Limited Liability Company	Xining		1951	
Nanshan Prison	Qinghai Tannery	Xining		1959	
Xichuan Prison	Qinghai Xifa Water and Electricity Equipment Manufacture Installment Limited Liability Company	Xining		1956	40% of prisoners are from minorities (Tibetans, Uyghurs, Miao, Bai, Yi)

== Other ==
Name	Enterprise name	City/County/District/Prefecture	Village/Town	Established	Notes
Chaidamu Prison	Nuomuhong Farm	Golmud		1955	
Dulan Prison	Xiangride Farm			1956	
Gonghe Prison	Wayuxiangka Farm			1956	Cultivated area of 75 km²
Guinan Prison	Bacang Farm	Guinan County Hainan Tibetan Autonomous Prefecture			
Haomen Prison		Haibei Tibetan Autonomous Prefecture			
Hualong Prison	Gandu Farm; Grain and Oil Processing Factory; Jade Carving Factory	Hualong Hui Autonomous County, Haidong Prefecture			
Menyuan Prison	Haomen Farm	Menyuan Hui Autonomous County, Haibei Tibetan Autonomous Prefecture	Shizui		Area of 30 km²
Nantan Prison	Qinghai Fur & Garment Works			1952	
Qinghai Provincial Women's Prison	Qinghai Province Qunxing Industry Limited Liability Company			1954	
Tanghe Prison	Tanggemu Farm	Gonghe County		1956	
Wulan Prison	Saishike Farm	Wulan County, Haixi Mongol and Tibetan Autonomous Prefecture	Xiligou		
Xi'ning Prison	Qinghaihu Hand Tools Limited Liability Company	Huangzhong	Duoba	result of a 2001 merger	Houses about 1,500 persons

== Sources ==
- "Laogai Handbook 2007-2008" (PDF) (in Chinese and English). Washington, D.C.: Laogai Research Foundation. October 2008. pp. 351–364. ISBN 978-1-931550-25-3.
