= Dabaozi =

Dabaozi (Chinese: 大堡子; pinyin: Dàbǎozǐ), may refer to:

- Dabaozi, Qinghai, a town in Chengbei District of Xi'ning, Qinghai, China
- Dabaozi, Hunan, a town in Jingzhou Miao and Dong Autonomous County, Hunan, China
