= Langboin Monastery =

Langboin Monastery or Dor'oxoizhuling is a Tibetan Buddhist monastery of the Jonang sect in the Golog Tibetan Autonomous Prefecture of Qinghai province, China. It is located 10 km west of Baima County in Langboin village, in Moba Township.

The monastery was built in 1943 by Oquehe, a Sichuan Nangtang monk with connections to Tsangwa Monastery and has a monk population of about 70, including 30 resident. The monastery has one sutra hall and one white dagoba. .
