= Zhunan (disambiguation) =

Zhunan is an urban township in northern Miaoli County, Taiwan.

Zhunan may also refer to:

- Zhunan railway station, a railway station on the Taiwan Railways Administration West Coast line
- Zhunan Village (朱南村), Dabaozi, Qinghai Province, China
- Zhunan Village (竹南村), Zhutian, Pingtung County, Taiwan
- Zhunan Village (竹南里), Cianjhen District, Kaohsiung, Taiwan
- Zhunan Village (竹南里), Lujhu District, Kaohsiung, Taiwan
