= Zhiduo =

Zhiduo may refer to:

- Zhiduo (clothing), traditional Chinese attire (hanfu) for men
- Zhiduo County, in Qinghai, China
