= Lejiawan, Qinghai =

Lejiawan 乐家湾镇
- Town
- Lejiawanzhen
- Location in Qinghai
- Coordinates: 36°34′31″N 101°49′54″E
- Country: China
- Province: Qinghai
- Autonomous prefecture: Xining
- County: Chengdong District

Area
  - Total: 41.95 km^{2} (16.20 sq mi)

Population (2010)
  - Total: 35,640
  - Density: 849.6/km^{2} (2,200/sq mi)
- Time zone: UTC+8 (China Standard)
- Local dialing code: 971

Lejiawan (Chinese: 乐家湾镇; pinyin: Lèjiāwān zhèn) is a town in Chengdong District, Xining, Qinghai, China. In 2010, Lejiawan had a total population of 35,640: 18,725 males and 16,915 females: 4,919 aged under 14, 28,041 aged between 15 and 65 and 2,680 aged over 65. During the Republic of China, Lejiawan was mentioned in Amdo Tibetan folk songs as a military base of the Ma warlord family. As of today, the town has a mine and is one of the most prominent sources of pollution in its geographical area. The Xining Caojiapu International Airport adjacent to Lejiawan also adds both to economic activities as to pollution levels.
