= Gangca County =

Gangca County 刚察县 • རྐང་ཚ་རྫོང
- County
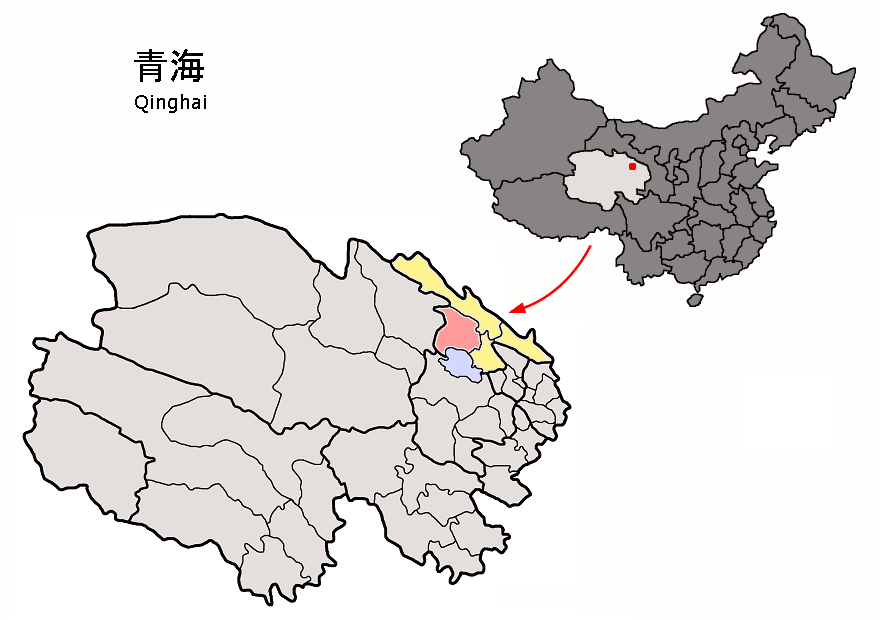
- Gangca County (light red) within Haibei Prefecture (yellow) and Qinghai

- Location in Qinghai
- Coordinates: 37°19′N 100°09′E
- Country: China
- Province: Qinghai
- Autonomous prefecture: Haibei
- Township-level divisions: 2 towns; 3 townships
- County seat: Shaliuhe

Area
  - Total: 9,575.91 km^{2} (3,697.28 sq mi)
- Elevation: 3,309 m (10,856 ft)

Population (2020)
  - Total: 40,720
  - Density: 4.252/km^{2} (11.01/sq mi)
- Time zone: UTC+8 (China Standard)
- Postal code: 812300
- Area code: 0970
- Website: www.gangcha.gov.cn

Gangca County

Chinese name
- Simplified Chinese: 刚察县
- Traditional Chinese: 剛察縣
Transcriptions
Standard Mandarin
- Hanyu Pinyin: Gāngchá Xiàn
Yue: Cantonese
- Jyutping: gong^{1}caat^{3} jyun^{2}

Tibetan name
- Tibetan: རྐང་ཚ་རྫོང
Transcriptions
- Wylie: rkang tsha rdzong
- Tibetan Pinyin: Gangca Zong

Gangca County (Tibetan: རྐང་ཚ་རྫོང; Chinese: 刚察县) is a county of northeastern Qinghai province, China, on the northern shore of Qinghai Lake. It is under the administration of Haibei Tibetan Autonomous Prefecture.

== Administrative divisions ==
Gangca County is made up of 2 towns and 3 townships:

Name	Simplified Chinese	Hanyu Pinyin	Tibetan	Wylie	Administrative division code
Towns
Shaliuhe Town (Omqu Town)	沙柳河镇	Shāliǔhé Zhèn	འོམ་ཆུ་གྲོང་རྡལ།	'om chu grong rdal	632224100
Hairgi Town (Baigê Town, Ha'ergai Town)	哈尔盖镇	Hā'ěrgài Zhèn	དཔལ་དགེ་གྲོང་རྡལ།	dpal dge grong rdal	632224101
Townships
Ih Ulan Township (Yugar'omlung Township, Yikewulan Township)	伊克乌兰乡	Yīkèwūlán Xiāng	གཡུ་དཀར་འོམ་ལུང་ཞང་།	g.yu dkar ʼom lung zhang	632224200
Qonj Township (Kyoinkyi Township, Quanji Township)	泉吉乡	Quánjí Xiāng	ཁྱོན་འཁྱིལ་ཞང་།	khyon 'khyil zhang	632224201
Jirmeng Township (Gyimoin Township, Ji'ermeng Township)	吉尔孟乡	Jí'ěrmèng Xiāng	སྐྱིད་སྨོན་ཞང་།	skyid smon zhang	632224202

== Geography and climate ==
With an elevation of around 3,300 metres (10,800 ft), Gangca County has an alpine subarctic climate (Köppen Dwc), with long, very cold, dry, and sunny winters, and short, rainy, mild summers. Average low temperatures are below freezing from late September to mid May; however, due to the wide diurnal temperature variation, the average high is above freezing from March to November inclusive. Despite frequent rain during summer, when a majority of days sees rain, no month has less than 55% of possible sunshine; with monthly percent possible sunshine ranging from 56% in June to 83% in November, the county seat receives 3,012 hours of bright sunshine annually. The monthly 24-hour average temperature ranges from −13.5 °C (7.7 °F) in January to 10.9 °C (51.6 °F) in July, while the annual mean is −0.32 °C (31.4 °F). Over 80% of the annual precipitation of 379 mm (14.9 in) is delivered from June to September.

Climate data for Gangca, elevation 3,302 m (10,833 ft), (1991–2020 normals, extremes 1971–2010)
Month	Jan	Feb	Mar	Apr	May	Jun	Jul	Aug	Sep	Oct	Nov	Dec	Year
Record high °C (°F)	4.6 (40.3)	7.9 (46.2)	13.2 (55.8)	23.4 (74.1)	21.5 (70.7)	22.1 (71.8)	27.5 (81.5)	25.1 (77.2)	21.6 (70.9)	17.9 (64.2)	9.4 (48.9)	6.6 (43.9)	27.5 (81.5)
Mean daily maximum °C (°F)	−4.5 (23.9)	−1.0 (30.2)	3.7 (38.7)	8.9 (48.0)	12.3 (54.1)	15.0 (59.0)	17.4 (63.3)	17.1 (62.8)	13.4 (56.1)	8.3 (46.9)	2.7 (36.9)	−2.1 (28.2)	7.6 (45.7)
Daily mean °C (°F)	−12.8 (9.0)	−9.3 (15.3)	−4.2 (24.4)	1.8 (35.2)	5.8 (42.4)	9.2 (48.6)	11.7 (53.1)	11.1 (52.0)	7.0 (44.6)	0.8 (33.4)	−5.6 (21.9)	−10.6 (12.9)	0.4 (32.7)
Mean daily minimum °C (°F)	−19.1 (−2.4)	−15.9 (3.4)	−10.6 (12.9)	−4.5 (23.9)	0.1 (32.2)	4.0 (39.2)	6.7 (44.1)	6.2 (43.2)	2.4 (36.3)	−4.4 (24.1)	−11.5 (11.3)	−16.7 (1.9)	−5.3 (22.5)
Record low °C (°F)	−31.3 (−24.3)	−29.5 (−21.1)	−23.3 (−9.9)	−15.4 (4.3)	−11.1 (12.0)	−6.6 (20.1)	−1.6 (29.1)	−3.2 (26.2)	−7.1 (19.2)	−17.4 (0.7)	−23.6 (−10.5)	−29.3 (−20.7)	−31.3 (−24.3)
Average precipitation mm (inches)	1.4 (0.06)	2.3 (0.09)	6.0 (0.24)	13.1 (0.52)	39.8 (1.57)	74.7 (2.94)	95.0 (3.74)	105.0 (4.13)	55.8 (2.20)	13.4 (0.53)	2.2 (0.09)	0.6 (0.02)	409.3 (16.13)
Average precipitation days (≥ 0.1 mm)	2.5	2.8	4.5	6.9	11.6	17.5	18.0	17.4	14.3	6.1	1.6	1.1	104.3
Average snowy days	3.7	3.7	6.9	9.4	8.3	1.4	0.3	0.5	2.6	7.1	2.7	2.2	48.8
Average relative humidity (%)	46	43	43	47	55	63	67	69	69	57	45	44	54
Mean monthly sunshine hours	238.4	230.3	259.2	256.6	256.5	227.1	240.3	238.3	218.3	255.7	247.4	240.7	2,908.8
Percentage possible sunshine	77	75	69	65	58	52	54	57	59	75	82	81	67
Source 1: China Meteorological Administration all-time extreme temperature
Source 2: Weather China

== Transport ==
- China National Highway 315

== See also ==
- List of administrative divisions of Qinghai
