= Datong Hui and Tu Autonomous County =

Datong County 大通县 གསེར་ཁོག་རྫོང་།
- Autonomous county
- 大通回族土族自治县 རྟ་ཐང་ཧུའེ་རིགས་ཧོར་རིགས་རང་སྐྱོང་རྫོང་། · دَاتْو خُوِذُو تُوذُو ذِجِشِیًا · Daatun Hui szarbaten Mongghul szarbaten njeenaa daglagu xan Datong Hui and Tu Autonomous County
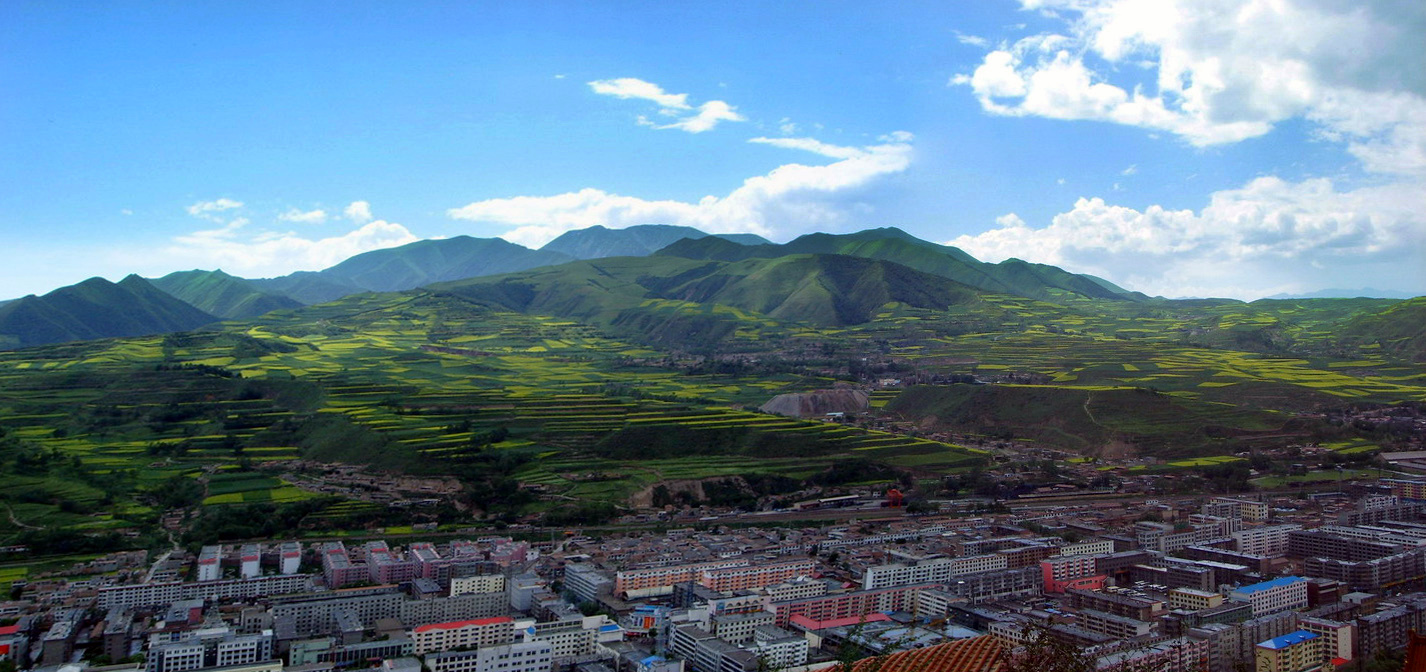
- Looking west over Datong town from Mt Laoye

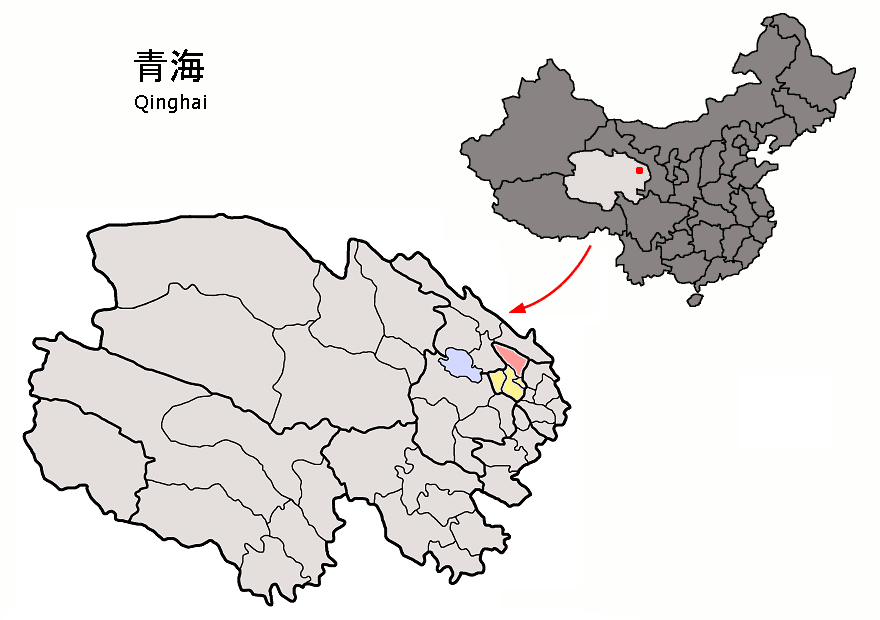
- Location of the county (red) in Xining City (yellow) and Qinghai
- Interactive map of Datong County
- Country: China
- Province: Qinghai
- Prefecture-level city: Xining
- County seat: Qiaotou Town

Area
  - Total: 3,090 km^{2} (1,190 sq mi)
- Elevation: 2,442 m (8,012 ft)

Population (2020)
  - Total: 403,368
  - Density: 131/km^{2} (338/sq mi)
- Time zone: UTC+8 (China Standard)

Datong Hui and Tu Autonomous County

Chinese name
- Simplified Chinese: 大通回族土族自治县
- Traditional Chinese: 大通回族土族自治縣
Transcriptions
Standard Mandarin
- Hanyu Pinyin: Dàtōng Huízú Tǔzú Zìzhìxiàn

Tibetan name
- Tibetan: རྟ་ཐང་ཧུའེ་རིགས་ཧོར་རིགས་རང་སྐྱོང་རྫོང་། or གསེར་ཁོག་རྫོང་།
Transcriptions
- Wylie: ta thung huʼe rigs hor rigs rang skyong rdzong or gser khog rdzong

Datong Hui and Tu Autonomous County, Datong County, or Serkhog County (simplified Chinese: 大通回族土族自治县; traditional Chinese: 大通回族土族自治縣; pinyin: Dàtōng Huízú Tǔzú Zìzhìxiàn; Tibetan: རྟ་ཐང་ཧུའེ་རིགས་ཧོར་རིགས་རང་སྐྱོང་རྫོང; or more frequently Tibetan: གསེར་ཁོག་རྫོང; Monguor: Daatun Hui szarbaten Mongghul szarbaten njeenaa daglagu xan; Xiao'erjing: دَاتْو خُوِذُو تُوذُو ذِجِشِیًا) is an autonomous county of Hui and Tu peoples in Qinghai Province, China. It is under the administration of the prefecture-level city of Xining, the capital of Qinghai.

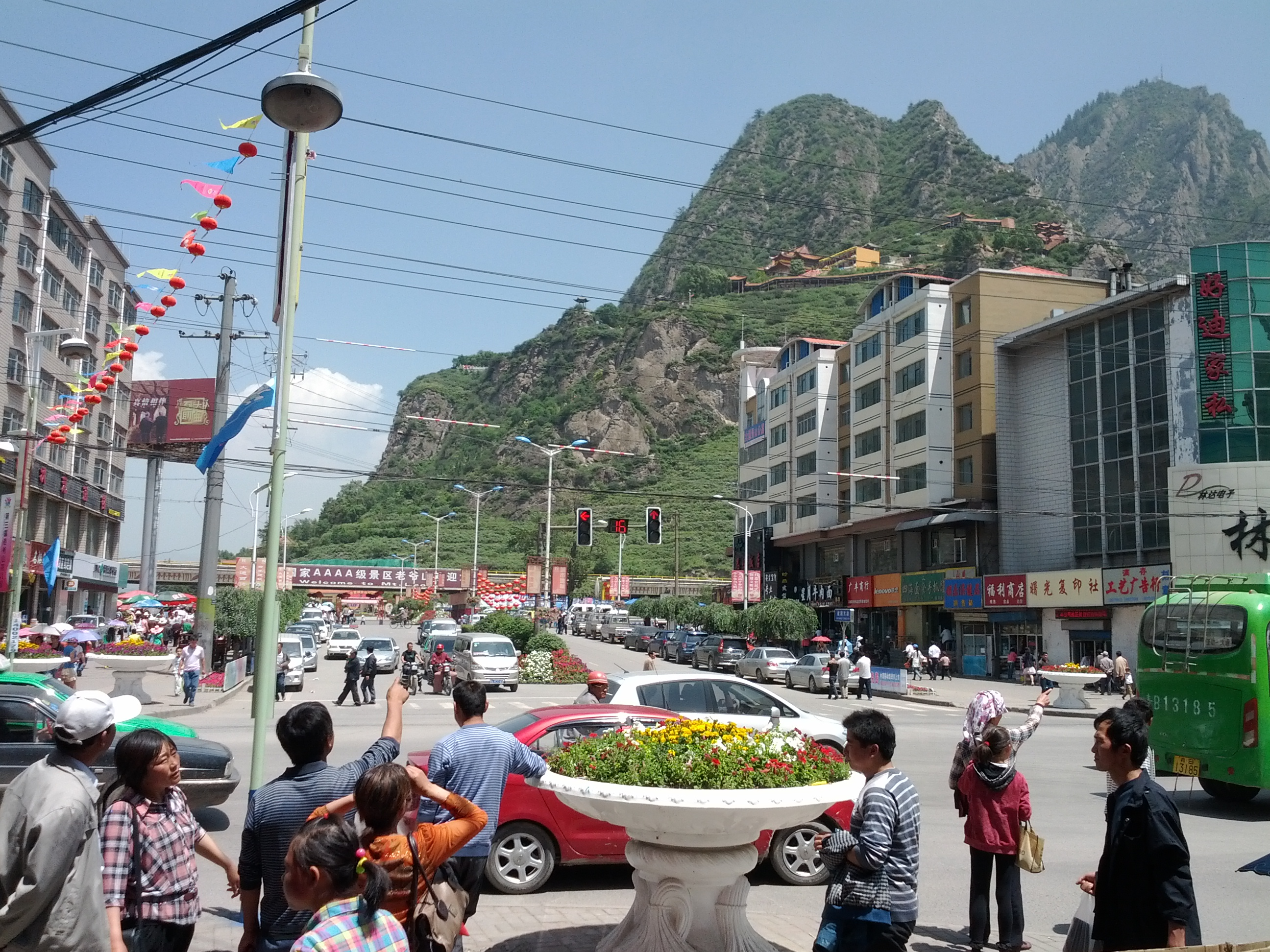
"Mount Laoye" as seen from Datong

Since 2009, a folk music "Flower Festival" has been held annually in late July on "Mount Laoye" (2928 m) in Datong town.

== Subdivisions ==
Datong County is divided into 9 towns, 9 townships, and 2 ethnic townships:

- Qiaotou Town (桥头镇)
- Chengguan Town (城关镇)
- Tar Town (塔尔镇)
- Huangjiazhai Town (黄家寨镇)
- Changning Town (长宁镇)
- Jingyang Town (景阳镇)
- Duolin Town (多林镇)
- Xinzhuang Town (新庄镇)
- Qinglin Township (青林乡)
- Xunrang Township (逊让乡)
- Jile Township (极乐乡)
- Shishan Township (石山乡)
- Baoku Township (宝库乡)
- Xiegou Township (斜沟乡)
- Liangjiao Township (良教乡)
- Hualin Township (桦林乡)
- Xangba Tibetan Ethnic Township (向化藏族乡, ཞང་དཔའ་བོད་རིགས་ཞང་།)
- Shobê Tibetan Ethnic Township (朔北藏族乡, ཧྲོ་པེ་བོད་རིགས་ཞང་།)

== Climate ==
Climate data for Datong, elevation 2,450 m (8,040 ft), (1991–2020 normals, extremes 1991–present)
Month	Jan	Feb	Mar	Apr	May	Jun	Jul	Aug	Sep	Oct	Nov	Dec	Year
Record high °C (°F)	14.0 (57.2)	19.0 (66.2)	25.2 (77.4)	30.9 (87.6)	29.7 (85.5)	30.4 (86.7)	35.6 (96.1)	32.8 (91.0)	27.9 (82.2)	25.3 (77.5)	16.8 (62.2)	13.0 (55.4)	35.6 (96.1)
Mean daily maximum °C (°F)	0.9 (33.6)	4.8 (40.6)	9.7 (49.5)	15.2 (59.4)	18.7 (65.7)	21.4 (70.5)	23.4 (74.1)	22.5 (72.5)	18.2 (64.8)	13.1 (55.6)	7.4 (45.3)	2.2 (36.0)	13.1 (55.6)
Daily mean °C (°F)	−8.4 (16.9)	−4.1 (24.6)	1.5 (34.7)	7.2 (45.0)	11.2 (52.2)	14.2 (57.6)	16.2 (61.2)	15.3 (59.5)	11.2 (52.2)	5.6 (42.1)	−1.0 (30.2)	−6.9 (19.6)	5.2 (41.3)
Mean daily minimum °C (°F)	−15.7 (3.7)	−11.3 (11.7)	−4.9 (23.2)	0.3 (32.5)	4.4 (39.9)	7.8 (46.0)	10.1 (50.2)	9.8 (49.6)	6.3 (43.3)	0.4 (32.7)	−6.9 (19.6)	−13.8 (7.2)	−1.1 (30.0)
Record low °C (°F)	−27.2 (−17.0)	−23.7 (−10.7)	−18.6 (−1.5)	−9.0 (15.8)	−3.8 (25.2)	−0.5 (31.1)	−0.3 (31.5)	0.0 (32.0)	−2.6 (27.3)	−14.6 (5.7)	−21.8 (−7.2)	−33.0 (−27.4)	−33.0 (−27.4)
Average precipitation mm (inches)	2.1 (0.08)	2.1 (0.08)	14.5 (0.57)	33.1 (1.30)	66.1 (2.60)	86.1 (3.39)	99.4 (3.91)	115.1 (4.53)	82.8 (3.26)	28.5 (1.12)	5 (0.2)	1.4 (0.06)	536.2 (21.1)
Average precipitation days (≥ 0.1 mm)	3.7	4.2	6.5	8.2	13.0	16.5	17.1	17.4	16.5	9.1	3.5	3.1	118.8
Average snowy days	5.8	6.9	9.4	5.9	1.1	0	0	0	0	3.0	5.3	5.1	42.5
Average relative humidity (%)	51	47	48	50	56	64	69	72	74	67	60	55	59
Mean monthly sunshine hours	200.9	200.2	227.4	230.9	237.1	218.6	221.9	211.1	175.8	196.1	204.1	197.9	2,522
Percentage possible sunshine	65	65	61	58	54	50	50	51	48	57	68	66	58
Source: China Meteorological Administrationall-time August High

== Transportation ==
- China National Highway 227
- Xining–Datong Expressway (Ningda Expressway)
- Xining–Datong Railway (Ningda Railway, 宁大铁路), a 39-km long dead-end railway branch constructed in 1966-1968 and primarily serving a local coal mine. In the past, passenger service operated on the line, but ceased in 2008.
- Lanzhou–Xinjiang High-Speed Railway (Datong West Station; 36.966168°N 101.672054°E), opened in December 2014. Very limited service.

== See also ==
- List of administrative divisions of Qinghai
