= Chengbei, Xining =

Chengbei 城北区
- District
- Interactive map of Chengbei
- Coordinates: 36°38′13″N 101°41′56″E
- Country: China
- Province: Qinghai
- Prefecture-level city: Xining
- Seat: Chaoyang Subdistrict

Area
  - Total: 137.7 km^{2} (53.2 sq mi)
- Elevation: 2,249 m (7,379 ft)

Population (2020)
  - Total: 417,701
  - Density: 3,033/km^{2} (7,857/sq mi)
- Time zone: UTC+8 (China Standard)
- Postal code: 810001

Chengbei, Xining
- Simplified Chinese: 城北区
- Traditional Chinese: 城北區
- Literal meaning: "city north district"
Transcriptions
Standard Mandarin
- Hanyu Pinyin: Chéngběi Qū

Chengbei (Chinese: 城北区) is one of four districts of the prefecture-level city of Xining, the capital of Qinghai Province, Northwest China, covering part of the northern portion of the city as its name suggests.

== Subdivisions ==
Chengbei District is divided into 4 subdistricts and 2 towns:

- Chaoyang Subdistrict (朝阳街道)
- Xiaoqiao Street Subdistrict (小桥大街街道)
- Mafang Subdistrict (马坊街道)
- Railway West Station Subdistrict (火车西站街道)
- Dabaozi Town (大堡子镇)
- Nianlipu Town (廿里铺镇)

== See also ==
- List of administrative divisions of Qinghai
