= Chengxi, Xining =

Chengxi 城西区
- District
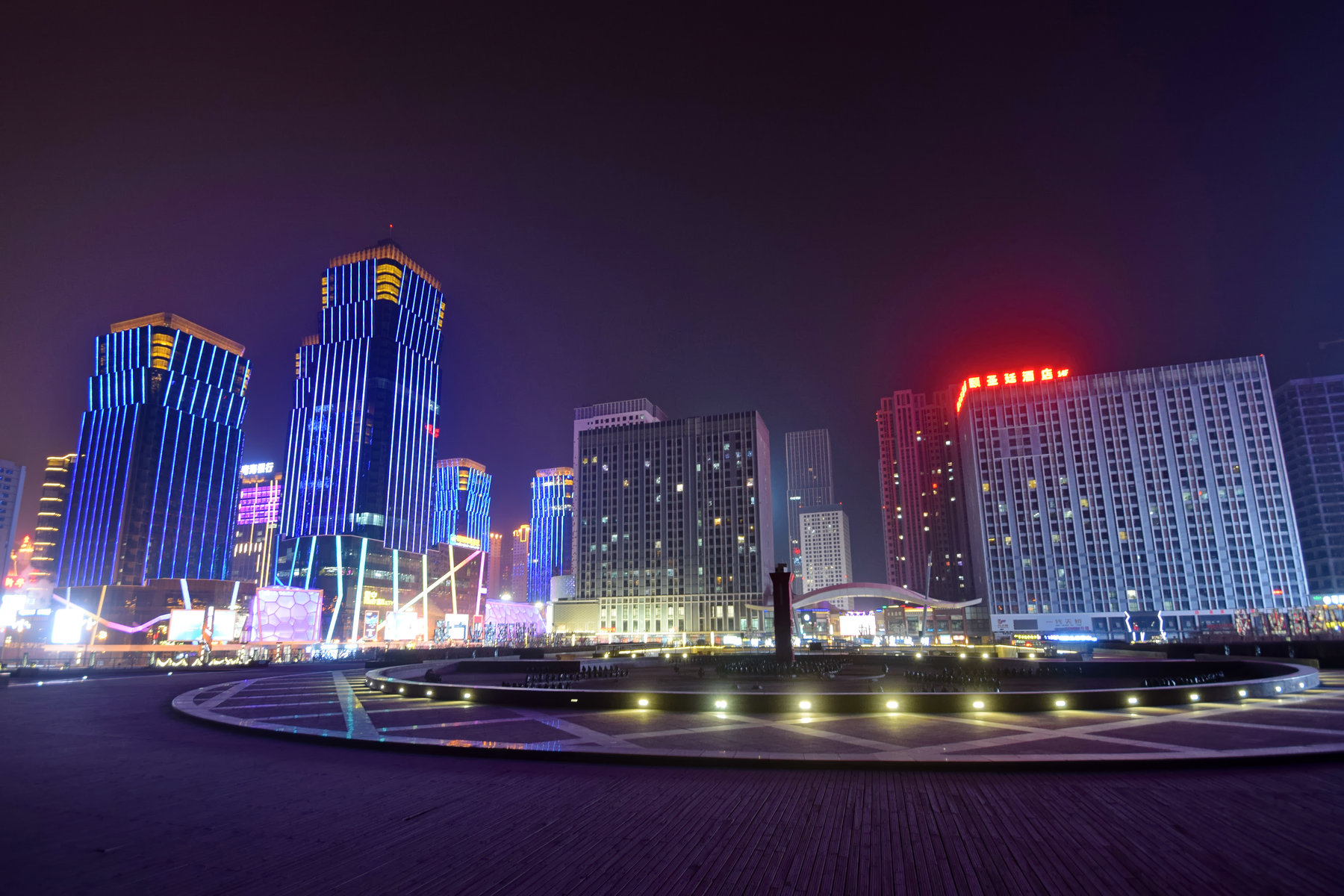
- Interactive map of Chengxi
- Coordinates: 36°37′42″N 101°45′57″E
- Country: China
- Province: Qinghai
- Prefecture-level city: Xining
- Seat: Xiguan Avenue Subdistrict

Area
  - Total: 52.98 km^{2} (20.46 sq mi)

Population (2020)
  - Total: 326,866
  - Density: 6,170/km^{2} (15,980/sq mi)
- Time zone: UTC+8 (China Standard)

Chengxi, Xining
- Simplified Chinese: 城西区
- Traditional Chinese: 城西區
- Literal meaning: "city west district"
Transcriptions
Standard Mandarin
- Hanyu Pinyin: Chéngxī Qū

Chengxi District (Chinese: 城西区) is one of four districts of the prefecture-level city of Xining, the capital of Qinghai Province, Northwest China.

It covers the western part of Xining's built-up conurbation. It has over 200 000 residents (2004). Ethnically, most are Han; there are also Hui, Tibetan, Tujia, etc. - 26 in all.

== Administrative divisions ==
Chengxi District is divided into 7 subdistricts and 1 town:

- Xiguan Avenue Subdistrict (西关大街街道)
- Guchengtai Subdistrict (古城台街道)
- Hutai Subdistrict (虎台街道)
- Shengli Road Subdistrict (胜利路街道)
- Xinghai Road Subdistrict (兴海路街道)
- Wenhui Road Subdistrict (文汇路街道)
- Tonghai Road Subdistrict (通海路街道)
- Pengjiazhai Town (彭家寨镇)

District executive, legislature and judiciary are in the Xiguan Avenue Subdistrict, together with the CPC and PSB branches. (Executive or People's Government is addressed : May Fourth Avenue, 810001).

== See also ==
- List of administrative divisions of Qinghai
