= Tashi Wangchuk (activist) =

Tashi Wangchuk (Tibetan: བཀྲ་ཤིས་དབང་ཕྱུག, Wylie: bkra shis dbang phyug) born in 1985 in Kyegudo, Yushu Tibetan Autonomous Prefecture the former Tibetan province of Amdo the current province of Qinghai, is a Tibetan activist defending the teaching of the Tibetan language after he appeared in a New York Times video in 2015. He was sentenced on 22 May 2018 in the Tibetan Autonomous Prefecture of Yushu to five years prison for "incitement to separatism". According to Amnesty International, "Tashi’s treatment exposes the ruthless lengths to which the Chinese authorities will go to silence those who ask the government to stop cultural assimilation."

Tashi Wangchuk has been brought home healthy from prison on 28 January 2021 his lawyer Liang Xiaojun told.
