= Chengdong, Xining =

Chengdong 城东区
- District
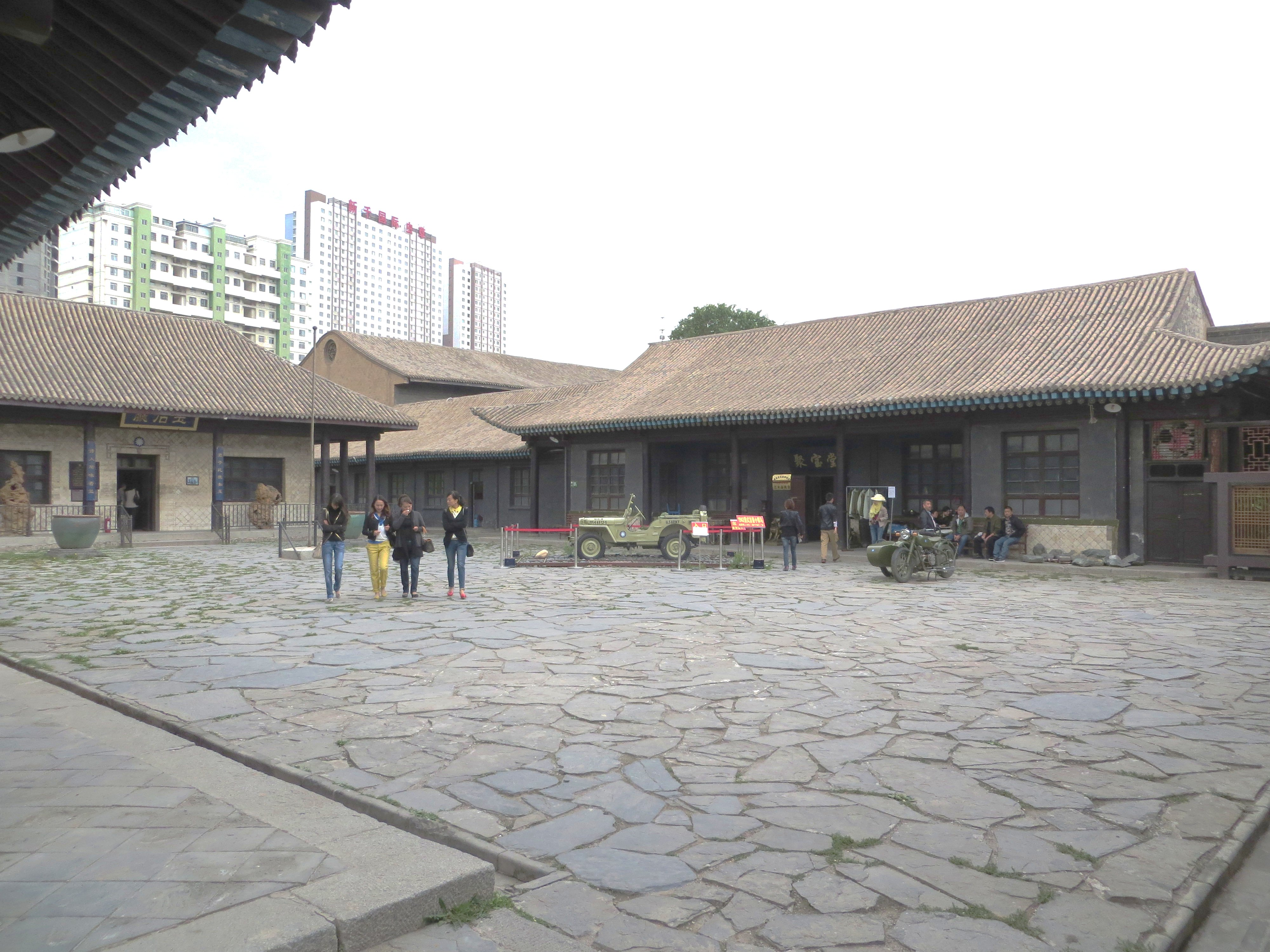
- Ma Bufang Mansion in Xining
- Interactive map of Chengdong
- Country: China
- Province: Qinghai
- Prefecture-level city: Xining
- Seat: Dazhong Street Subdistrict

Area
  - Total: 114.59 km^{2} (44.24 sq mi)

Population (2020)
  - Total: 489,372
  - Density: 4,270.6/km^{2} (11,061/sq mi)
- Time zone: UTC+8 (China Standard)

Chengdong, Xining
- Simplified Chinese: 城东区
- Traditional Chinese: 城東區
- Literal meaning: "city east district"
Transcriptions
Standard Mandarin
- Hanyu Pinyin: Chéngdōng Qū

Chengdong District (Chinese: 城东区) is one of four districts of the prefecture-level city of Xining, the capital of Qinghai Province, Northwest China.

== Subdivisions ==
Chengdong District is divided into 7 subdistricts and 2 towns:

- Dongguang Street Subdistrict (东关大街街道)
- Qingzhen Alley Subdistrict (清真巷街道)
- Dazhong Street Subdistrict (大众街街道)
- Zhoujiaquan Subdistrict (周家泉街道)
- Huochezhan Subdistrict (火车站街道)
- Bayi Road Subdistrict (八一路街道)
- Linjiaya Subdistrict (林家崖街道)
- Lejiawan Town (乐家湾镇)
- Yunjiakou Town (韵家口镇)

== See also ==
- List of administrative divisions of Qinghai
