= Dabaozi, Qinghai =

Dabaozi Town
- Town

Chinese transcription(s)
  - Simplified: 大堡子镇
  - Traditional: 大堡子鎮
  - Pinyin: Dàbǎozǐ Zhèn
- Location in Qinghai.
- Coordinates: 36°40′24″N 101°39′11″E
- Country: China
- Province: Qinghai
- Prefecture: Xining
- District: Chengbei District

Area
  - Total: 48.17 km^{2} (18.60 sq mi)

Population (2018)
  - Total: 27,044
  - Density: 561.4/km^{2} (1,454/sq mi)
- Time zone: UTC+8 (China Standard)
- Postal code: 810000
- Area code: 0971

Dabaozi (Chinese: 大堡子镇) is a town in Chengbei District of Xining, Qinghai, China. As of the 2017 census it has a population of 21,000 and an area of 45 square kilometres (17 sq mi).

== History ==
After the establishment of the Communist State in 1949, Dabaozi was under the jurisdiction of Huangzhong County. In 1956 it came under the jurisdiction of Xining, capital of northwest China's Qinghai province. In 1958 it was renamed "Dongfeng People's Commune". In 1984 it was incorporated as a township. In 1986 it was upgraded to a town.

== Administrative division ==
As of 2017, the town is divided into 13 villages and two communities:

- Songjiazhai (Chinese: 宋家寨村)
- Dabaozi (Chinese: 大堡子村)
- Jinjiawan (Chinese: 晋家湾村)
- Taobei (Chinese: 陶北村)
- Zhunan (Chinese: 朱南村)
- Zhubei (Chinese: 朱北村)
- Taonan (Chinese: 陶南村)
- Yanxiao (Chinese: 严小村)
- Wangjiazhai (Chinese: 汪家寨村)
- Yiqizhai (Chinese: 乙其寨村)
- Wuzhong (Chinese: 吴仲村)
- Balang (Chinese: 吧浪村)
- Baojiazhai (Chinese: 鲍家寨村)
- Gongjuchang Community (Chinese: 工具厂社区)
- Yijichuang Community (Chinese: 一机床社区)

== Geography ==
The Huangshui River (Chinese: 湟水) passes through the town from west to east.

== Education ==
The Xining No. 9 High School is located in the town.

== Transportation ==
The G6 Beijing–Lhasa Expressway, G109 Xining-Huangzhong County Expressway (Chinese: 西湟高速公路) and G045 Dandong-Lhasa Expressway (Chinese: 丹拉高速公路) pass through the town.
