= Tianjun County =

Tianjun County 天峻县 · ᠲᠢᠶᠡᠨ ᠵᠢᠶᠦ᠋ᠨ ᠰᠢᠶᠠᠠ· ཐེམ་ཆེན་རྫོང་། Têmqên
- County
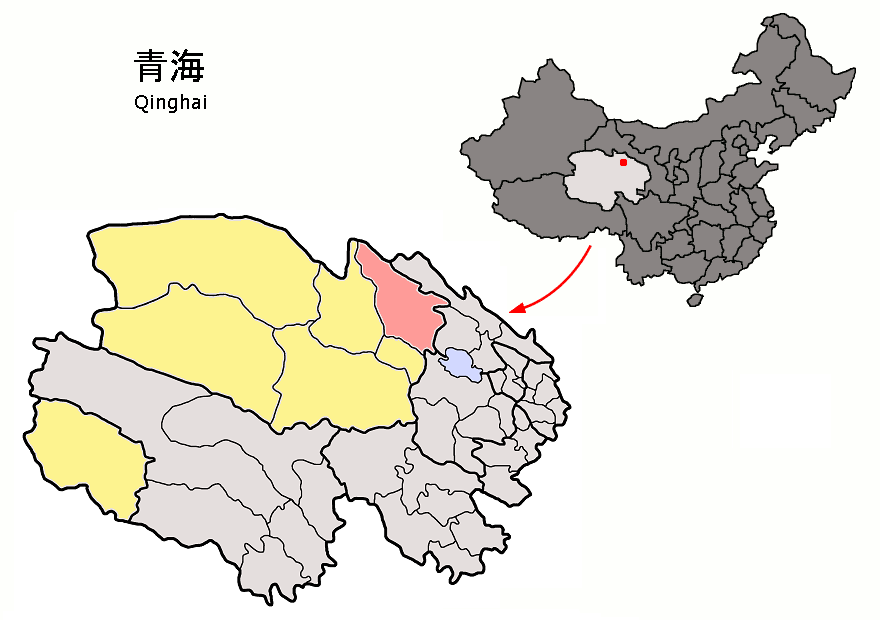
- Location of Tianjun County (red) within Haixi Prefecture (yellow) and Qinghai

- Location of the city centre in Qinghai
- Coordinates: 37°55′N 98°39′E
- Country: China
- Province: Qinghai
- Autonomous prefecture: Haixi
- County seat: Xinyuan

Area
  - Total: 25,989 km^{2} (10,034 sq mi)

Population (2020)
  - Total: 23,203
  - Density: 0.89280/km^{2} (2.3123/sq mi)
- Time zone: UTC+8 (China Standard)
- Website: www.tianjun.gov.cn

Tianjun County

Chinese name
- Simplified Chinese: 天峻县
- Traditional Chinese: 天峻縣
Transcriptions
Standard Mandarin
- Hanyu Pinyin: Tiānjùn Xiàn

Tibetan name
- Tibetan: ཐེམ་ཆེན་རྫོང་།
Transcriptions
- Wylie: them chen rdzong
- Tibetan Pinyin: Têmqên Zong

Mongolian name
- Mongolian script: ᠲᠢᠶᠡᠨ ᠵᠢᠶᠦ᠋ᠨ ᠰᠢᠶᠠᠠ

Tianjun County, alternately romanized from Tibetan as Themchen, is a county of Qinghai Province, China, bordering Gansu Province to the north. It is under the administration of the Haixi Mongol and Tibetan Autonomous Prefecture. The county seat in Xinyuan Town.

== Administrative divisions ==
Tianjun County is divided into 3 towns and 7 townships.

Name	Simplified Chinese	Hanyu Pinyin	Tibetan	Wylie	Mongolian (traditional script)	Mongolian (Cyrillic)	Administrative division code
Towns
Xinyuan Town (Xêyoin)	新源镇	Xīnyuán Zhèn	ཤེས་ཡོན་གྲོང་རྡལ།	shes yon grong rdal			632823100
Muri Town (Muli, Mêri)	木里镇	Mùlǐ Zhèn	མེ་རི་གྲོང་རྡལ།	me ri grong rdal			632823101
Jianghe Town (Jongqu)	江河镇	Jiānghé Zhèn	ཅོང་ཆུ་གྲོང་རྡལ།	cong chu grong rdal			632823102
Townships
Karmar Township (Kuai'erma)	快尔玛乡	Kuài'ěrmǎ Xiāng	མཁར་དམར་ཡུལ་ཚོ།	mkhar dmar yul tsho			632823200
Zhugkyung Township (Zhouqun)	舟群乡	Zhōuqún Xiāng	འབྲུག་ཁྱུང་ཤང་།	'brug khyung shang			632823201
Chagmar Township (Zhihema)	织合玛乡	Zhīhémǎ Xiāng	བྲག་དམར་ཤང་།	brag dmar shang			632823202
Sur Township (Suru, Suli)	苏里乡	Sūlǐ Xiāng	སུ་རུ་ཡུལ་ཚོ།	su ru yul tsho			632823203
Sênggê Township (Sengge, Shengge)	生格乡	Shēnggé Xiāng	སེང་གེ་ཤང་།	seng ge shang			632823204
Yangkêng Township (Yangkang)	阳康乡	Yángkāng Xiāng	གཡང་ཁེངས་ཤང་།	g.yang khengs shang			632823205
Lungmar Township (Longmen)	龙门乡	Lóngmén Xiāng	ལུང་དམར་ཡུལ་ཚོ།	lung dmar yul tsho			632823206

== Climate ==
Tianjun County has a dry-winter subalpine climate (Köppen Dwc), in common with many parts of the Tibetan Plateau. It features pleasant, rainy summers with chilly mornings, and frigid, clear, extremely dry winters with large diurnal temperature swings.

Climate data for Tianjun, elevation 3,417 m (11,211 ft), (1991–2020 normals, extremes 1991–present)
Month	Jan	Feb	Mar	Apr	May	Jun	Jul	Aug	Sep	Oct	Nov	Dec	Year
Record high °C (°F)	6.0 (42.8)	10.8 (51.4)	17.7 (63.9)	24.2 (75.6)	22.1 (71.8)	23.8 (74.8)	28.0 (82.4)	26.6 (79.9)	23.7 (74.7)	17.8 (64.0)	11.7 (53.1)	8.3 (46.9)	28.0 (82.4)
Mean daily maximum °C (°F)	−3.6 (25.5)	−0.4 (31.3)	4.0 (39.2)	9.4 (48.9)	12.9 (55.2)	15.5 (59.9)	17.7 (63.9)	17.5 (63.5)	14.0 (57.2)	8.5 (47.3)	2.6 (36.7)	−2.0 (28.4)	8.0 (46.4)
Daily mean °C (°F)	−12.9 (8.8)	−9.7 (14.5)	−4.9 (23.2)	1.2 (34.2)	5.3 (41.5)	8.8 (47.8)	11.1 (52.0)	10.6 (51.1)	6.5 (43.7)	−0.2 (31.6)	−6.6 (20.1)	−11.1 (12.0)	−0.2 (31.7)
Mean daily minimum °C (°F)	−20.7 (−5.3)	−17.7 (0.1)	−12.7 (9.1)	−6.6 (20.1)	−1.8 (28.8)	2.7 (36.9)	5.4 (41.7)	4.8 (40.6)	0.9 (33.6)	−6.8 (19.8)	−13.7 (7.3)	−18.3 (−0.9)	−7.0 (19.3)
Record low °C (°F)	−34.2 (−29.6)	−30.6 (−23.1)	−25.1 (−13.2)	−19.8 (−3.6)	−15.5 (4.1)	−7.9 (17.8)	−2.9 (26.8)	−5.2 (22.6)	−10.8 (12.6)	−18.5 (−1.3)	−26.0 (−14.8)	−33.7 (−28.7)	−34.2 (−29.6)
Average precipitation mm (inches)	1.4 (0.06)	1.8 (0.07)	6.4 (0.25)	13.1 (0.52)	47.7 (1.88)	79.0 (3.11)	96.7 (3.81)	85.7 (3.37)	44.2 (1.74)	8.8 (0.35)	1.5 (0.06)	0.4 (0.02)	386.7 (15.24)
Average precipitation days (≥ 0.1 mm)	2.1	2.2	4.3	6.8	11.3	16.5	18.4	17.0	11.5	3.9	1.4	0.8	96.2
Average snowy days	3.2	3.8	6.6	8.4	8.4	2.5	0.8	0.7	2.0	4.3	2.2	1.5	44.4
Average relative humidity (%)	39	37	37	42	55	65	70	70	67	51	37	36	51
Mean monthly sunshine hours	240.6	232.8	263.8	266.4	258.8	226.9	233.6	229.9	220.4	262.2	249.5	242.2	2,927.1
Percentage possible sunshine	78	75	70	67	59	52	53	55	60	77	83	82	68
Source: China Meteorological Administration

== Economy ==
The county is served by the Qinghai–Tibet Railway; its Tianjun railway station is located near the county seat, Xinyuan Town.

Large coalfields are worked near Muli Town in the northern part of the county, at the elevation around 4,000 m above the sea level. The Muli coal fields are connected with the Ha'ergai railway station on the Qinghai–Tibet Railway by a 195 km (121 mi) long branch railway, whose two sections are known as the Tsaidar Railway (柴达尔铁路) and the Tsaidar-Muli Railway (柴木铁路).
