= Banma County =

Banma County 班玛县 · པདམ་རྫོངས། Baima
- County
- Nickname: Pema (པདམ།)
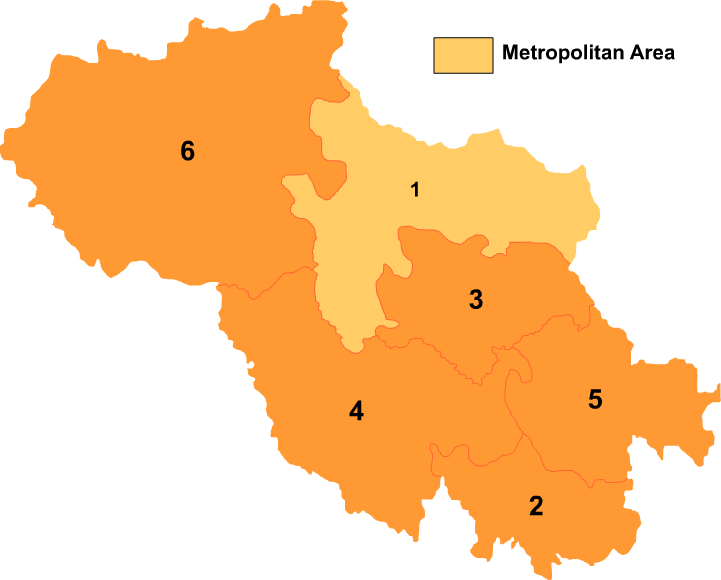
- Banma County (division numbered "2") in Golog Prefecture

- Location in Qinghai
- Coordinates: 32°56′05″N 100°44′09″E
- Country: China
- Province: Qinghai
- Autonomous prefecture: Golog
- County seat: Sêlêtang

Area
  - Total: 6,376 km^{2} (2,462 sq mi)

Population (2020)
  - Total: 31,794
  - Density: 4.987/km^{2} (12.92/sq mi)
- Time zone: UTC+8 (China Standard)
- Website: www.banma.gov.cn

Banma County

Chinese name
- Simplified Chinese: 班玛县
- Traditional Chinese: 班瑪縣
Transcriptions
Standard Mandarin
- Hanyu Pinyin: Bānmǎ Xiàn
Yue: Cantonese
- Jyutping: baan^{1}maa^{5} jyun^{2}

Tibetan name
- Tibetan: པདམ་རྫོངས།
Transcriptions
- Wylie: pad ma rdzong
- Tibetan Pinyin: Baima Zong

Banma County or Baima County is a county of southeastern Qinghai Province, China, bordering Sichuan to the south. It is the southernmost county-level division under the administration of Golog Tibetan Autonomous Prefecture. The Red Army of the Chinese Communist Party passed through Banma in 1936 during the Long March. The seat of Baima county is in Sêlêtang.

It is home to Bennak, a Nyingma monastery of the Pelyul tradition, founded in 1824, which was visited by noted female teacher Sera Khandro. A 1992 work indicates that the 22 monasteries in the county are predominantly Nyingma.

== Administrative divisions ==
Banma is divided into one town and eight townships:

Name	Simplified Chinese	Hanyu Pinyin	Tibetan	Wylie	Administrative division code
Town
Sêlêtang Town (Sailaitang, Sêraitang)	赛来塘镇	Sàiláitáng Zhèn	སེ་ལེ་ཐང་གྲོང་བརྡལ།	se le thang grong brdal	632622100
Townships
Dokongma Township (Duogongma)	多贡麻乡	Duōgòngmá Xiāng	མདོ་གོང་མ་ཞང་།	mdo gong ma zhang	632622200
Markog Township (Makehe)	马可河乡	Mǎkěhé Xiāng	སྨར་ཁོག་ཞང་།	mdo gong ma zhang	632622201
Gyimkar Township (Jika, Kyimkar)	吉卡乡	Jíkǎ Xiāng	གྱི་མཁར་ཞང་།	gyi mkhar zhang	632622202
Dagkar Township (Daka)	达卡乡	Dákǎ Xiāng	སྟག་མཁར་ཞང་།	stag mkhar zhang	632622203
Chubqên Township (Zhiqin)	知钦乡	Zhīqīn Xiāng	གྲུབ་ཆེན་ཞང་།	grub chen zhang	632622204
Jagritang Township (Jiangritang)	江日堂乡	Jiāngrìtáng Xiāng	ལྕགས་རི་ཐང་ཞང་།	lcags ri thang zhang	632622205
Yartang Township (Ya'ertang)	亚尔堂乡	Yà'ěrtáng Xiāng	ཡར་ཐང་ཞང་།	yar thang zhang	632622206
Dimda Township (Dengta)	灯塔乡	Dēngtǎ Xiāng	དྷི་མདའ་ཞང་།	dhi mda' zhang	632622207

== Climate ==
Climate data for Banma, elevation 3,530 m (11,580 ft), (1991–2020 normals, extremes 1981–present)
Month	Jan	Feb	Mar	Apr	May	Jun	Jul	Aug	Sep	Oct	Nov	Dec	Year
Record high °C (°F)	15.9 (60.6)	16.9 (62.4)	19.4 (66.9)	23.6 (74.5)	26.1 (79.0)	24.7 (76.5)	28.6 (83.5)	29.6 (85.3)	26.3 (79.3)	23.7 (74.7)	15.9 (60.6)	15.0 (59.0)	29.6 (85.3)
Mean daily maximum °C (°F)	3.6 (38.5)	5.7 (42.3)	8.7 (47.7)	12.4 (54.3)	15.6 (60.1)	18.0 (64.4)	20.1 (68.2)	20.1 (68.2)	17.3 (63.1)	12.1 (53.8)	8.0 (46.4)	4.6 (40.3)	12.2 (53.9)
Daily mean °C (°F)	−7.0 (19.4)	−4.0 (24.8)	−0.1 (31.8)	4.1 (39.4)	7.7 (45.9)	10.8 (51.4)	12.4 (54.3)	11.8 (53.2)	9.1 (48.4)	3.9 (39.0)	−2.0 (28.4)	−6.3 (20.7)	3.4 (38.1)
Mean daily minimum °C (°F)	−15.3 (4.5)	−11.9 (10.6)	−7.0 (19.4)	−2.5 (27.5)	1.6 (34.9)	5.5 (41.9)	6.9 (44.4)	6.2 (43.2)	3.9 (39.0)	−1.5 (29.3)	−9.0 (15.8)	−14.2 (6.4)	−3.1 (26.4)
Record low °C (°F)	−27.1 (−16.8)	−26.2 (−15.2)	−18.9 (−2.0)	−15.7 (3.7)	−5.7 (21.7)	−2.8 (27.0)	−1.2 (29.8)	−3.8 (25.2)	−6.0 (21.2)	−11.5 (11.3)	−21.3 (−6.3)	−26.8 (−16.2)	−27.1 (−16.8)
Average precipitation mm (inches)	5.0 (0.20)	9.2 (0.36)	19.0 (0.75)	35.8 (1.41)	85.8 (3.38)	131.5 (5.18)	112.0 (4.41)	101.5 (4.00)	103.0 (4.06)	49.6 (1.95)	6.8 (0.27)	2.8 (0.11)	662 (26.08)
Average precipitation days (≥ 0.1 mm)	4.3	6.6	10.4	13.5	20.0	22.4	20.6	18.7	20.1	15.2	4.9	2.8	159.5
Average snowy days	6.5	9.3	14.9	13.5	5.3	0.4	0.1	0.1	0.7	10.0	7.5	4.7	73
Average relative humidity (%)	46	46	51	55	61	69	71	72	73	67	53	46	59
Mean monthly sunshine hours	196.7	177.5	198.8	211.1	198.4	167.7	188.2	190.5	164.9	171.9	198.4	204.2	2,268.3
Percentage possible sunshine	62	57	53	54	46	39	43	47	45	49	64	66	52
Source: China Meteorological Administration

== See also ==
- List of administrative divisions of Qinghai
