= Haibei Tibetan Autonomous Prefecture =

Coordinates: 36.95°N 100.90°E

Haibei Prefecture 海北州 · མཚོ་བྱང་ཁུལ།
- Autonomous prefecture
- Haibei Tibetan Autonomous Prefecture 海北藏族自治州 · མཚོ་བྱང་བོད་རིགས་རང་སྐྱོང་ཁུལ
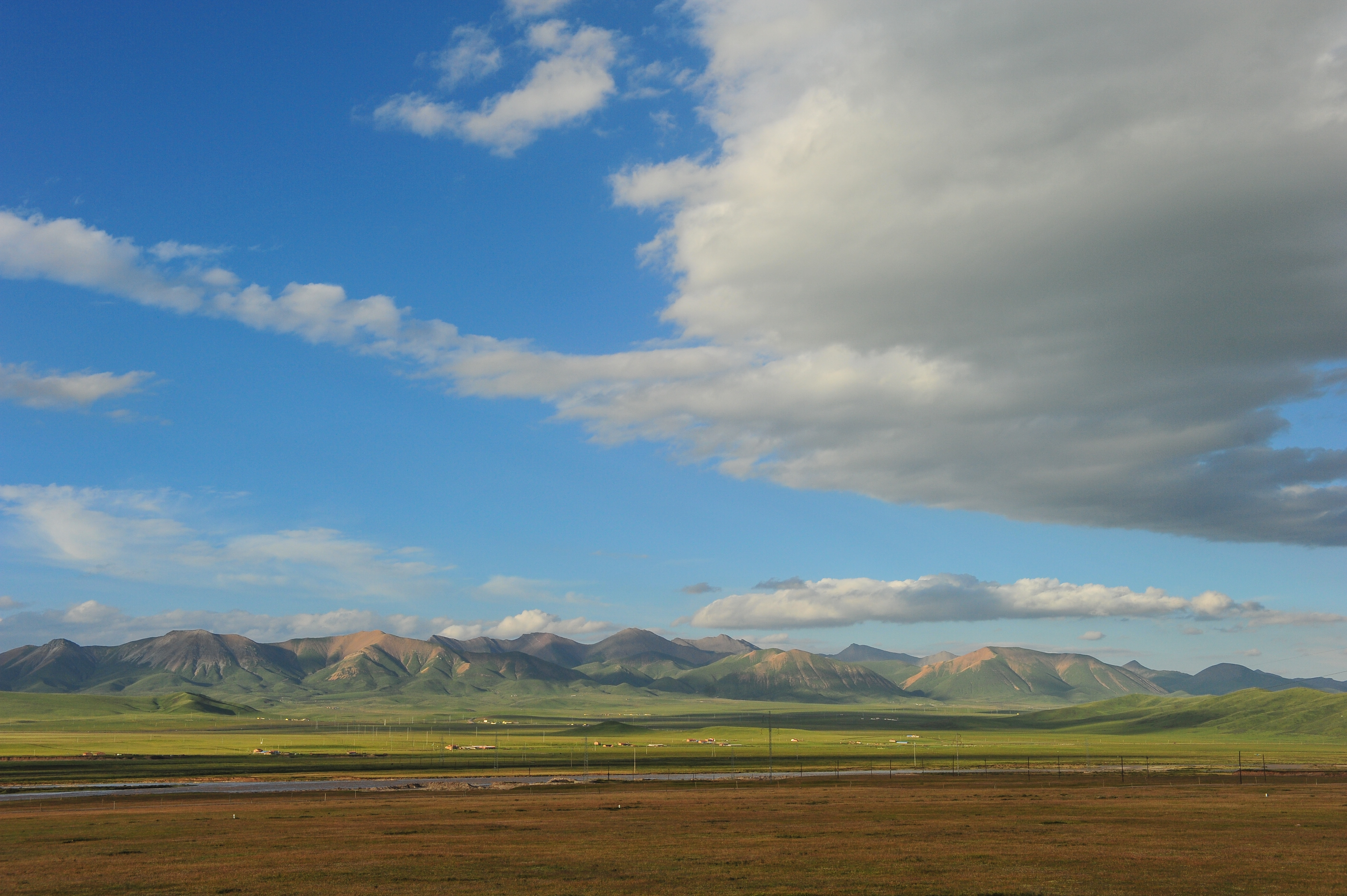
- Qilian Mountains

- Location of Haibei Prefecture in Qinghai
- Country: People's Republic of China
- Province: Qinghai
- Prefecture seat: Haiyan County (Xihai)

Area
  - Total: 33,350 km^{2} (12,880 sq mi)

Population (2020)
  - Total: 265,322
  - Density: 7.956/km^{2} (20.61/sq mi)

GDP
  - Total: CN¥ 9.5 billion US$ 1.5 billion
  - Per capita: CN¥ 34,122; US$ 5,479
- Time zone: UTC+8 (China Standard)
- ISO 3166 code: CN-QH-22

Haibei Tibetan Autonomous Prefecture

Chinese name
- Chinese: 海北藏族自治州
Transcriptions
Standard Mandarin
- Hanyu Pinyin: Hǎiběi Zàngzú Zìzhìzhōu

Tibetan name
- Tibetan: མཚོ་བྱང་བོད་རིགས་རང་སྐྱོང་ཁུལ
Transcriptions
- Wylie: mtsho-byang bod-rigs rang-skyong-khul
- Tibetan Pinyin: Cojang Poirig Ranggyong Kü

Haibei Tibetan Autonomous Prefecture (Chinese: 海北藏族自治州; Tibetan: མཚོ་བྱང་བོད་རིགས་རང་སྐྱོང་ཁུལ་, Wylie: mtsho-byang bod-rigs rang-skyong-khul, Tib.pin.: cojang poirig ranggyong kü) is an autonomous prefecture of northeastern Qinghai Province, China. The prefecture has an area of 39,354 square kilometres (15,195 sq mi) and its seat is Haiyan County. Its name literally means "north of Qinghai Lake." This Tibetan culture area was incorporated into Qinghai province in the early 1950s, as it lies distant from the Tibet Autonomous Region.

== Demographics ==
According to the 2020 census, Haibei had 265,322 inhabitants with a population density of 6.58 inhabitants/km^{2}.

The following is a list of ethnic groups in the prefecture, as of the 2020 census.

Ethnicity	Population	Percentage
Han	87,679	33.05%
Hui	86,737	32.69%
Tibetan	68,900	24.15%
Mongol	12,499	4.71%
Tu/Monguor	6,601	2.49%
Salar	1,177	0.44%
Tujia	891	0.34%
Others	838	0.32%

== Subdivisions ==
The prefecture is subdivided into 4 county-level divisions: 3 counties, and 1 autonomous county:

Map
Name	Hanzi	Hanyu Pinyin	Tibetan	Wylie Tibetan Pinyin	Population (2010 Census)	Area (km^{2})	Density (/km^{2})
Haiyan County	海晏县	Hǎiyàn Xiàn	ཧའེ་ཡན་རྫོང་	ha'e yan rdzong Ha'êyan Zong	37,788	4,348	8.69
Qilian County	祁连县	Qílián Xiàn	ཆི་ལེན་རྫོང་	chi len rdzong Qilên Zong	46,473	15,610	2.97
Gangca County (Gangcha County)	刚察县	Gāngchá Xiàn	རྐང་ཚ་རྫོང་	rkang tsha rdzong Gangca Zong	41,333	12,500	3.30
Menyuan Hui Autonomous County	门源回族自治县	Ményuán Huízú; Zìzhìxiàn	མོང་ཡོན་ཧུའེ་རིགས་རང་སྐྱོང་རྫོང་	mong yon hu'e rigs rang skyong rdzong Mongyoin Hu'êrig; Ranggyong Zong	147,710	6,896	21.41

=== Plateau Ecological Animal Husbandry ===
Haibei Tibetan Autonomous Prefecture is a pilot area for "Plateau Modern Ecological Animal Husbandry." This model integrates controlled grazing, pasture restoration, and sustainable livestock management to balance ecological conservation with the economic development of local herding communities on the fragile alpine grassland ecosystem.
