= Chindu County =

Chindu County 称多县 · ཁྲི་འདུ་རྫོང་། Chenduo, Chengduo
- County
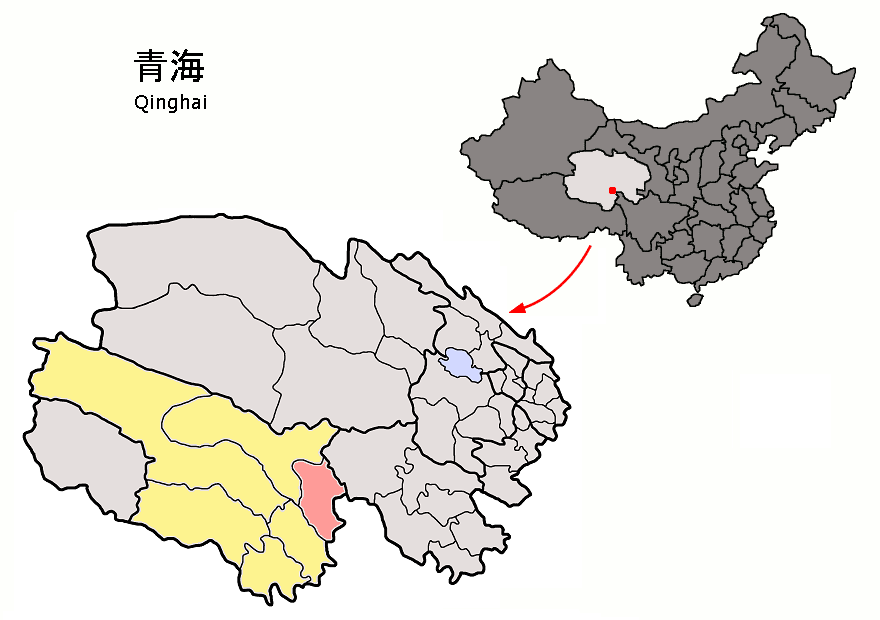
- Chindu County (light red) within Yushu Prefecture (yellow) and Qinghai

- Location of the seat in Qinghai
- Coordinates: 33.37°N 97.11°E
- Country: China
- Province: Qinghai
- Autonomous prefecture: Yushu
- County seat: Chiwang Town

Area
  - Total: 15,300 km^{2} (5,900 sq mi)

Population (2020)
  - Total: 57,159
  - Density: 3.74/km^{2} (9.68/sq mi)
- Time zone: UTC+8 (China Standard)
- Postal code: 815100
- Website: www.chengduo.gov.cn

Chindu County

Chinese name
- Simplified Chinese: 称多县
- Traditional Chinese: 稱多縣
Transcriptions
Standard Mandarin
- Hanyu Pinyin: Chènduō Xiàn

Tibetan name
- Tibetan: ཁྲི་འདུ་རྫོང་།
Transcriptions
- Wylie: khri 'du rdzong
- Tibetan Pinyin: Chindu Zong

Chindu County (Tibetan: ཁྲི་འདུ་རྫོང་།) or Chenduo County (Chinese: 称多县) is a county of Qinghai Province, China, bordering Sichuan to the east. It is under the administration of Yushu Tibetan Autonomous Prefecture.

== Administrative divisions ==
Chindu is divided to 5 towns and 2 townships.

Name	Simplified Chinese	Hanyu Pinyin	Tibetan	Wylie	Administrative division code
Towns
Chiwang Town (Chengwen)	称文镇	Chēngwén Zhèn	ཁྲི་དབང་གྲོང་བརྡལ།	khri dbang grong brdal	632723100
Xêwu Town (Xiewu)	歇武镇	Xiēwǔ Zhèn	བཞི་དབུས་གྲོང་རྡལ།	bzhi dbus grong rdal	632723101
Zadoi Town (Zhaduo)	扎朵镇	Zhāduǒ Zhèn	རྫ་སྟོད་གྲོང་བརྡལ།	rdza stod grong brdal	632723102
Domda Town (Qingshuihe)	清水河镇	Qīngshuǐhé Zhèn	སྡོམ་མདའ་གྲོང་རྡལ།	sdom mda' grong rdal	632723103
Chainqên Town (Zhenqin)	珍秦镇	Zhēnqín Zhèn	དྲན་ཆེན་གྲོང་བརྡལ།	dran chen grong brdal	632723104
Townships
Gadoi Township (Gaduo)	尕朵乡	Gǎduǒ Xiāng	སྒ་སྟོད་ཞང་།	sga stod zhang	632723200
Lab Township (Labu)	拉布乡	Lābù Xiāng	ལབ་ཞང་།	lab zhang	632723201

== Climate ==
Chindu County has an alpine climate (Köppen climate classification ETH). The average annual temperature in Chindu is −4.3 °C (24.3 °F). The average annual rainfall is 519.8 mm (20.46 in) with July as the wettest month. The temperatures are highest on average in July, at around 7.0 °C (44.6 °F), and lowest in January, at around −16.6 °C (2.1 °F).

Climate data for Qingshuihe Town, Chindu County, elevation 4,415 m (14,485 ft), (1991–2020 normals, extremes 1981–2010)
Month	Jan	Feb	Mar	Apr	May	Jun	Jul	Aug	Sep	Oct	Nov	Dec	Year
Record high °C (°F)	9.4 (48.9)	7.3 (45.1)	12.2 (54.0)	16.2 (61.2)	19.3 (66.7)	20.3 (68.5)	22.5 (72.5)	20.8 (69.4)	19.2 (66.6)	16.8 (62.2)	8.9 (48.0)	6.5 (43.7)	22.5 (72.5)
Mean daily maximum °C (°F)	−5.8 (21.6)	−3.2 (26.2)	0.5 (32.9)	4.8 (40.6)	8.6 (47.5)	11.7 (53.1)	14.1 (57.4)	13.9 (57.0)	11.1 (52.0)	4.8 (40.6)	−0.6 (30.9)	−4.2 (24.4)	4.6 (40.3)
Daily mean °C (°F)	−16.3 (2.7)	−13.1 (8.4)	−8.6 (16.5)	−3.0 (26.6)	1.3 (34.3)	5.1 (41.2)	7.4 (45.3)	6.7 (44.1)	3.6 (38.5)	−3.0 (26.6)	−10.5 (13.1)	−15.3 (4.5)	−3.8 (25.2)
Mean daily minimum °C (°F)	−25.4 (−13.7)	−22.1 (−7.8)	−16.8 (1.8)	−9.5 (14.9)	−4.3 (24.3)	0.1 (32.2)	1.9 (35.4)	1.1 (34.0)	−1.3 (29.7)	−8.3 (17.1)	−18.0 (−0.4)	−24.3 (−11.7)	−10.6 (13.0)
Record low °C (°F)	−41.2 (−42.2)	−38.8 (−37.8)	−36.6 (−33.9)	−24.3 (−11.7)	−15.6 (3.9)	−10.3 (13.5)	−6.6 (20.1)	−10.9 (12.4)	−14.7 (5.5)	−29.5 (−21.1)	−35.8 (−32.4)	−41.9 (−43.4)	−41.9 (−43.4)
Average precipitation mm (inches)	8.3 (0.33)	8.6 (0.34)	14.2 (0.56)	23.9 (0.94)	57.9 (2.28)	100.9 (3.97)	102.2 (4.02)	92.3 (3.63)	76.3 (3.00)	34.2 (1.35)	6.2 (0.24)	3.3 (0.13)	528.3 (20.79)
Average precipitation days (≥ 0.1 mm)	7.0	8.2	11.8	13.9	19.5	22.7	20.3	18.9	20.5	14.7	5.6	4.4	167.5
Average snowy days	9.1	10.1	14.9	16.4	20.8	11.4	3.4	3.7	12.5	17.1	7.6	6.1	133.1
Average relative humidity (%)	58	56	57	61	68	74	74	74	76	72	63	56	66
Mean monthly sunshine hours	205.6	188.7	221.3	232.9	225.4	185.2	210.6	203.8	180.7	211.7	224.5	221.4	2,511.8
Percentage possible sunshine	65	60	59	59	52	43	48	50	49	61	73	72	58
Source: China Meteorological Administration
