= Zhidoi County =

Zhidoi County 治多县 · འབྲི་སྟོད་རྫོང། Zhiduo
- County
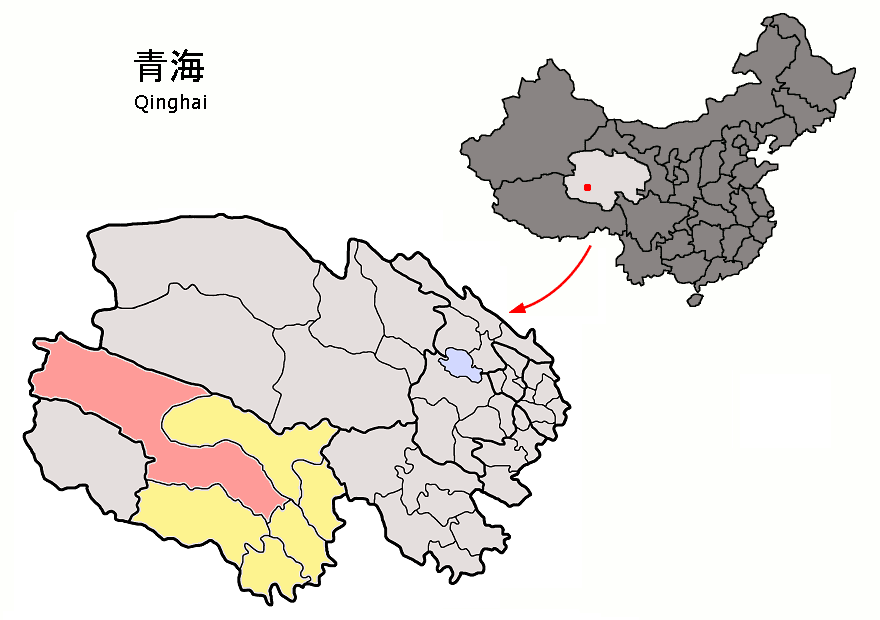
- Location of Zhidoi County (red) within Yushu Prefecture (yellow) and Qinghai

- Location of the seat in Qinghai
- Coordinates: 33°50′38″N 95°37′01″E
- Country: China
- Province: Qinghai
- Autonomous prefecture: Yushu
- County seat: Gyaijêpozhang

Area
  - Total: 80,200 km^{2} (31,000 sq mi)

Population (2020)
  - Total: 34,496
  - Density: 0.430/km^{2} (1.11/sq mi)
- Time zone: UTC+8 (China Standard)
- Postal code: 815400
- Website: www.zhiduo.gov.cn

Zhidoi County

Chinese name
- Simplified Chinese: 治多县
- Traditional Chinese: 治多縣
Transcriptions
Standard Mandarin
- Hanyu Pinyin: Zhìduō Xiàn

Tibetan name
- Tibetan: འབྲི་སྟོད་རྫོང།
Transcriptions
- Wylie: 'bri stod rdzong
- Tibetan Pinyin: Zhidoi Zong

Zhidoi County (Tibetan: འབྲི་སྟོད་རྫོང།, Chinese: 治多县) is a county in the west and southwest of Qinghai Province, China, bordering the autonomous regions of Tibet to the west and Xinjiang to the northwest. It is under the administration of Yushu Tibetan Autonomous Prefecture.

== Administrative divisions ==
Zhidoi County is divided to 1 town and 5 townships.

Name	Simplified Chinese	Hanyu Pinyin	Tibetan	Wylie	Administrative division code
Town
Gyaijêpozhang Town (Gyaijêpozhanggê, Jiajiboluo)	加吉博洛镇	Jiājíbóluò Zhèn	རྒྱལ་རྗེ་ཕོ་བྲང་གྲོང་བརྡལ།	rgyal rje pho brang grong brdal	632724100
Townships
So'gya Township (Sogya, Suojia)	索加乡	Suǒjiā Xiāng	ཟོ་སྐྱ་ཞང་།	zo skya zhang	632724200
Chaggar Township (Chaggur, Zhahe)	扎河乡	Zhāhé Xiāng	བྲག་དཀར་ཞང་།	brag dkar zhang	632724201
Doicê Township (Duocai)	多彩乡	Duōcǎi Xiāng	སྟོད་ཚེ་ཞང་།	stod tshe zhang	632724202
Zhiqu Township	治渠乡	Zhìqú Xiāng	འབྲི་ཆུ་ཞང་།	'bri chu zhang	632724203
Lixin Township	立新乡	Lìxīn Xiāng	ལིས་ཤིན་ཞང་།	lis shin zhang	632724204

== Climate ==
Zhidoi County has a dry-winter subalpine climate (Köppen Dwc) bordering upon an alpine climate (ETH), featuring cool, rainy summers and frigid, dry winters. Diurnal temperature variation is substantial throughout the year: an average morning falls below 5 °C or 41 °F in every month of the year, and in December and January, mean minima are below −17.8 °C or 0 °F.

Climate data for Zhidoi, elevation 4,179 m (13,711 ft), (1991–2020 normals, extremes 1991–present)
Month	Jan	Feb	Mar	Apr	May	Jun	Jul	Aug	Sep	Oct	Nov	Dec	Year
Record high °C (°F)	11.2 (52.2)	10.1 (50.2)	15.1 (59.2)	17.3 (63.1)	23.4 (74.1)	25.2 (77.4)	25.6 (78.1)	25.6 (78.1)	22.1 (71.8)	20.1 (68.2)	10.6 (51.1)	10.1 (50.2)	25.6 (78.1)
Mean daily maximum °C (°F)	−2.9 (26.8)	−0.2 (31.6)	3.6 (38.5)	7.9 (46.2)	11.5 (52.7)	14.2 (57.6)	16.9 (62.4)	16.7 (62.1)	13.6 (56.5)	7.8 (46.0)	2.4 (36.3)	−1.2 (29.8)	7.5 (45.5)
Daily mean °C (°F)	−11.9 (10.6)	−8.7 (16.3)	−4.8 (23.4)	−0.2 (31.6)	4.1 (39.4)	7.7 (45.9)	10.2 (50.4)	9.6 (49.3)	6.4 (43.5)	−0.1 (31.8)	−6.5 (20.3)	−10.7 (12.7)	−0.4 (31.3)
Mean daily minimum °C (°F)	−19.6 (−3.3)	−16.5 (2.3)	−12.3 (9.9)	−7.4 (18.7)	−2.3 (27.9)	2.5 (36.5)	4.5 (40.1)	4.0 (39.2)	1.3 (34.3)	−5.7 (21.7)	−13.3 (8.1)	−18.5 (−1.3)	−6.9 (19.5)
Record low °C (°F)	−34.4 (−29.9)	−31.3 (−24.3)	−24.4 (−11.9)	−17.8 (0.0)	−12.3 (9.9)	−5.5 (22.1)	−4.2 (24.4)	−7.0 (19.4)	−7.0 (19.4)	−17.8 (0.0)	−28.0 (−18.4)	−34.9 (−30.8)	−34.9 (−30.8)
Average precipitation mm (inches)	4.6 (0.18)	3.0 (0.12)	6.6 (0.26)	12.3 (0.48)	38.0 (1.50)	88.4 (3.48)	89.6 (3.53)	80.9 (3.19)	71.7 (2.82)	20.6 (0.81)	2.6 (0.10)	1.8 (0.07)	420.1 (16.54)
Average precipitation days (≥ 0.1 mm)	4.4	4.1	7.3	9.0	15.8	21.9	20.3	18.5	19.6	10.8	3.4	2.5	137.6
Average snowy days	6.9	7.3	11.1	13.0	17.0	5.2	1.3	0.7	5.7	12.9	5.6	4.2	90.9
Average relative humidity (%)	44	40	42	48	57	67	67	68	71	62	48	41	55
Mean monthly sunshine hours	194.0	179.1	206.2	221.1	224.9	193.3	218.9	207.6	197.8	226.1	219.1	213.7	2,501.8
Percentage possible sunshine	61	57	55	56	52	45	50	51	54	65	71	70	57
Source: China Meteorological Administration

== Gallery ==
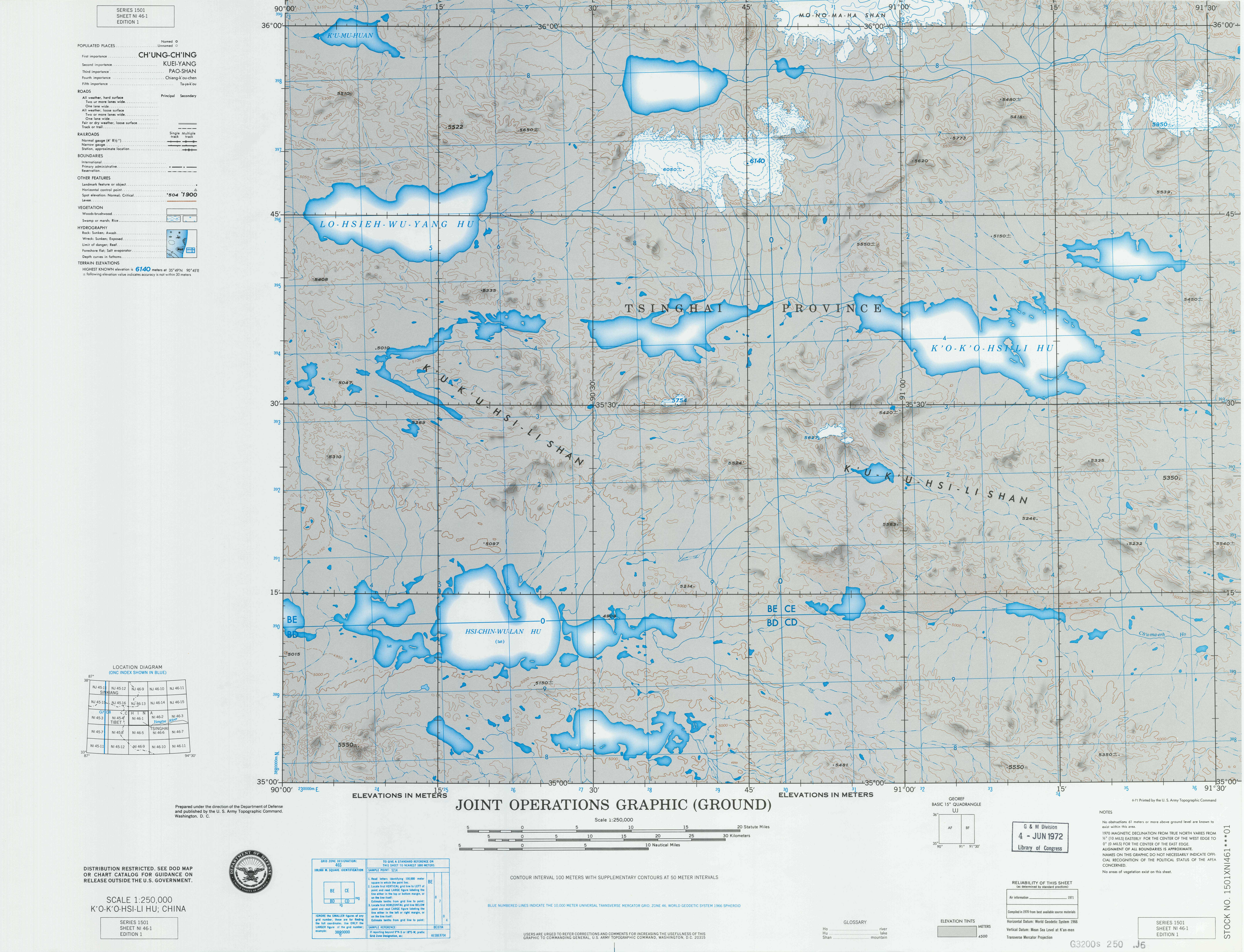

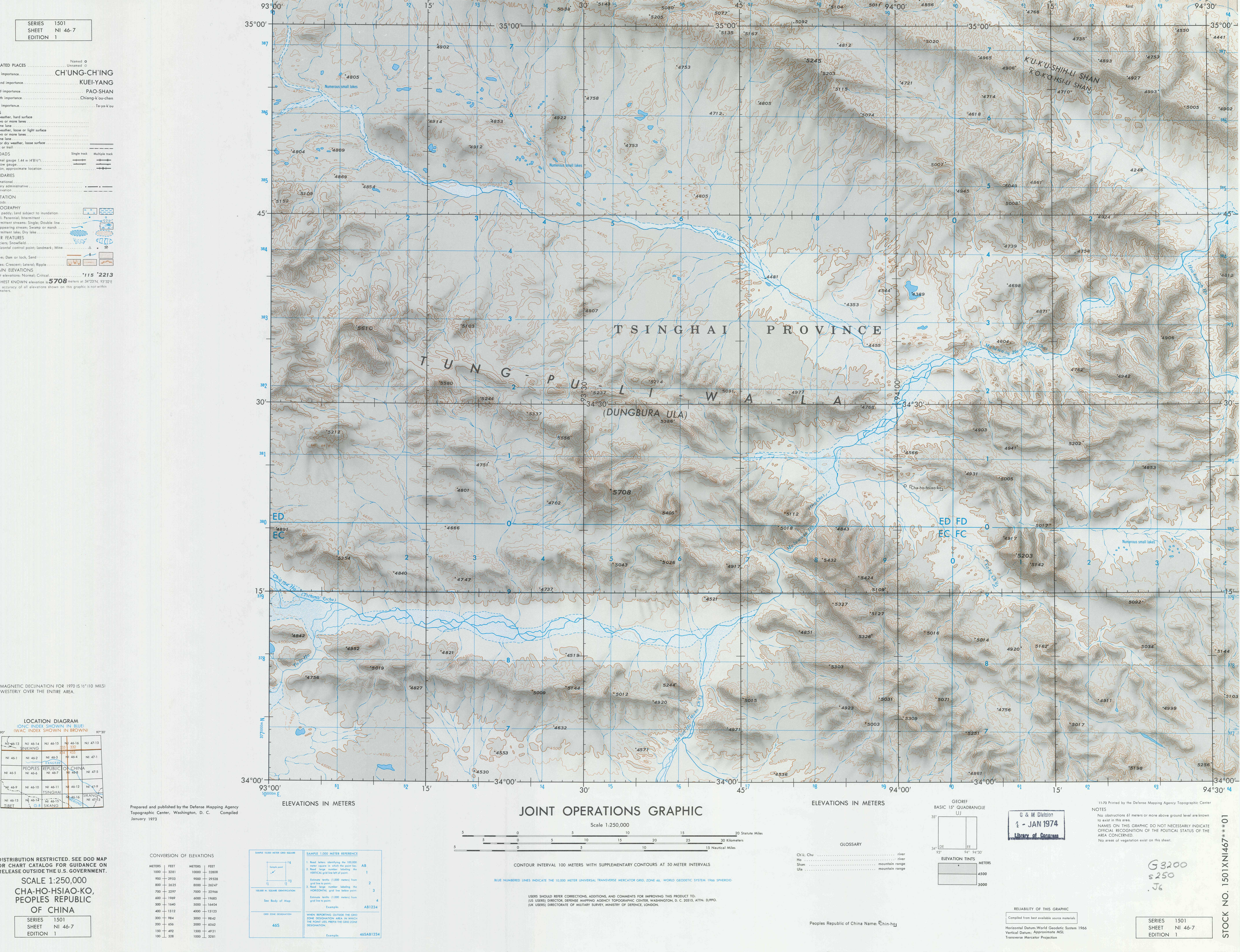

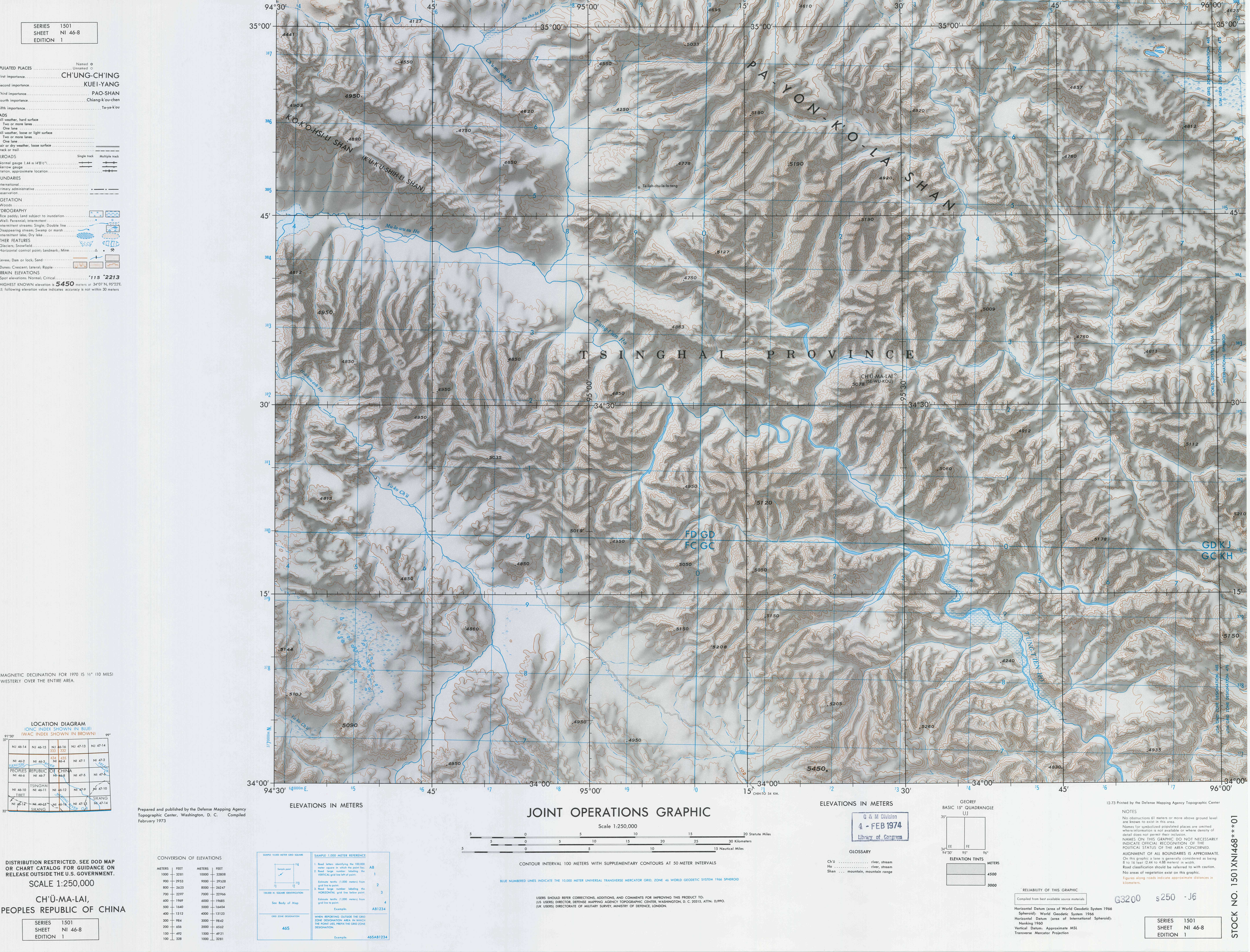

== See also ==
- Hoh Xil
