= High Plains Doctor: Healing on the Tibetan Plateau =

- Directed by: Michael Oved Dayan
- Produced by: Michael Oved Dayan
- Cinematography: Michael Oved Dayan
- Music by: Isaac Sobol; Roman Elinson
- Production company: Helliwell Pictures
- Distributed by: documentary (TV channel)
- Release date: May 7, 2012 (Canada)
- Running time: 67 minutes
- Country: Canada
- Language: English

High Plains Doctor: Healing on the Tibetan Plateau is a 2012 documentary film by Michael Dayan, who produced, directed, and shot the film. Premiering on the documentary channel in Canada, it focuses on documenting the life journey of Isaac Sobol, who recounts his professional experiences and personal insights as Chief Medical Officer of Nunavut and professor of Aboriginal People's Health.

High Plains Doctor was shot in the village of Yushu, which was leveled in an earthquake shortly after filming. The film is the only known moving picture documentation of the town before its destruction, providing a rare document into a way of life that is disappearing. The film documents Sobol's tenth and final medical mission to Yushu.

== Locations ==
- Yushu, Tibet
- Iqaluit, Nunavut, Canada

== Releases ==
The Canadian premiere was on CBC television's documentary channel on May 7, 2012. The first charity (or fundraiser) pre-release screening was at the Park Theatre in Vancouver BC Canada on April 15, 2012. The United States premiere will be at the 2013 Santa Barbara International Film Festival January 24 - February 3, 2013. The film is entered in the Social Justice Competition.
