= China National Highway 215 =

Road in China

National Highway 215
- 215国道

Route information
- Length: 641 km (398 mi)

Major junctions
- From: Hongliuyuan, Gansu
- To: Yushu, Qinghai

Location
- Country: China

Highway system
- National Trunk Highway System; Primary; Auxiliary
← G214	→ G216

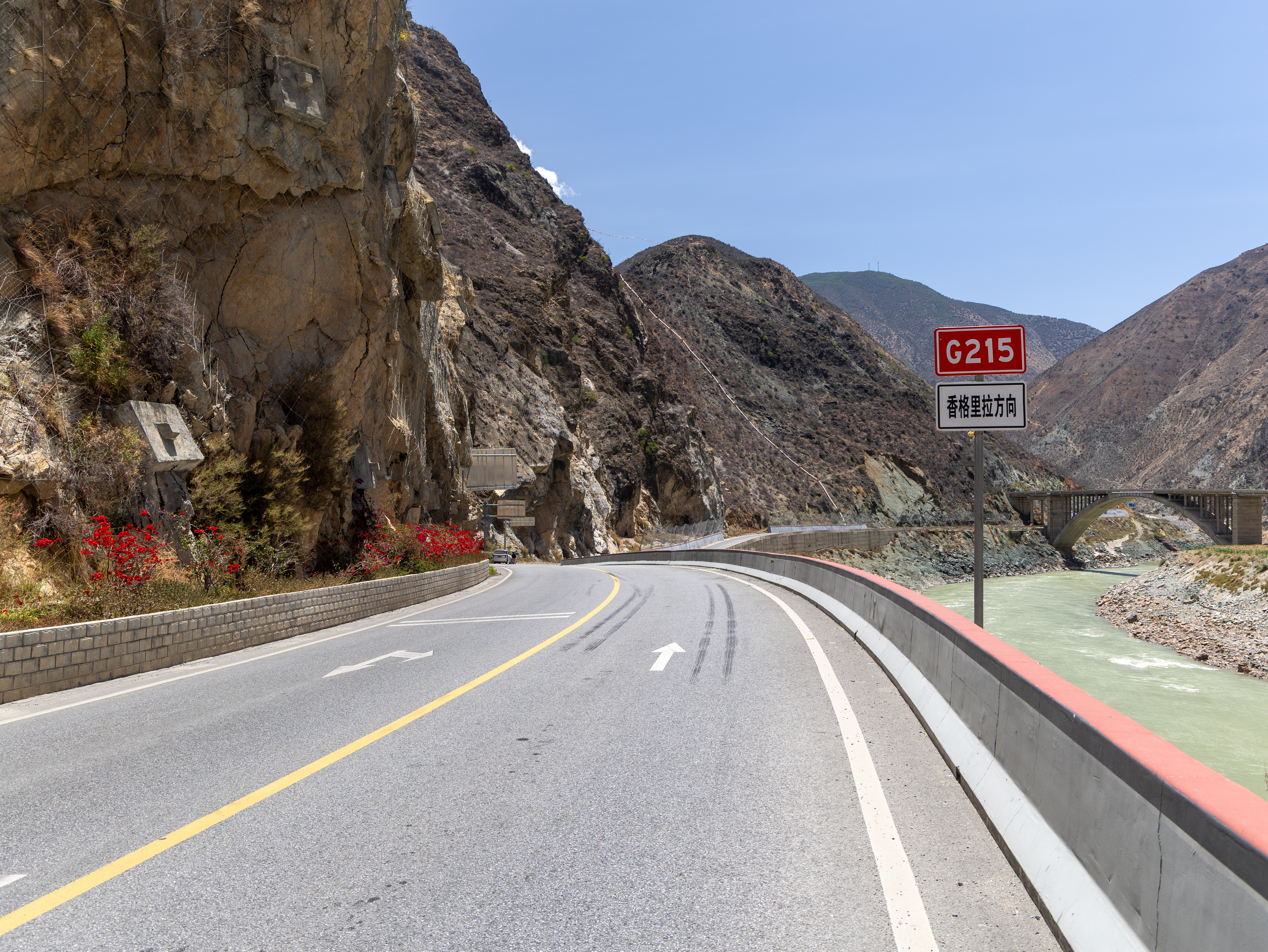
China National Highway 215 at Dêrong County close to Shangri-La, Yunnan

China National Highway 215 (G215) (sometimes referred to as Gansu Provincial Highway 215) runs from Hongliuyuan, Gansu to Yushu, Qinghai. It was originally 641 kilometres in length and ran south from Hongliuyuan towards Golmud. As part of the 2013 National Highway extension plan, it was extended to Yushu via Qumarlêb County and Zhidoi County, superseding part of Qinghai provincial highway S308.

== Route and distance ==
Route and distance

City	Distance (km)
Hongliuyuan, Gansu	0
Dunhuang, Gansu	128
Aksai, Gansu	223
Golmud, Qinghai	641
Zhidoi County, Qinghai	
Qumarlêb County, Qinghai	
Yushu, Qinghai	

== See also ==
- China National Highways
