= Batang =

Batang may refer to:

== Places ==
=== China ===
A Chinese county

- Batang County (巴塘县), a county in Garzê Tibetan Autonomous Prefecture, Sichuan

Chinese towns

- Batang, Sichuan (巴塘镇), the seat of Batang County, Sichuan
- Batang, Guangxi (八塘镇), a town in Gangnan District, Guigang, Guangxi
- Batang, Ningxiang (坝塘镇), a town of Ningxiang City, Hunan

Chinese township

- Batang Township (巴塘乡), a township of Yushu County, Qinghai

Chinese rivers

- Batang River, Qinghai (巴塘河), a tributary of the Tongtian River in Qinghai
- Batang River, Sichuan (巴塘河), a tributary of the Jinsha River in Sichuan

=== Southeast Asia ===
- Batang Regency, regency in Central Java province, Indonesia
  - Batang, Batang, capital of Batang Regency
- Batang Serangan, a district in North Sumatra, Indonesia
- Batang, one of the 28 barangays of Irosin, Sorsogon, Philippines

== Others ==
- Narrow-barred Spanish mackerel (Batang), a type of fish
- Batang (font style), a type of typeface that means "Background" in Korean
