= Batang River (disambiguation) =

The Batang River (Chinese: 巴塘河, Batánghé) usually refers to the Batang River in Qinghai, also known as the Zha Chu.

It may also refer to the Batang River, Sichuan, also known as the Ba Chu.
