= Saizong Monastery =

Buddhist monastery in Qinghai, China

Serdzong Monastery

Religion
- Affiliation: Tibetan Buddhism

Location
- Location: Xinghai County, Qinghai, China
- Country: China
- Interactive map of Serdzong Monastery
- Coordinates: 35.50268°N 99.79849°E

Saizong Monastery (Chinese: 赛宗寺) is a Buddhist monastery in Xinghai County, Qinghai, China. It is also known as the Treldzong Gompa, Drakar Treldzong Thösamling, Thösam Yönten Dargyling, and Serdzong Monastery. (Note: For Treldzong Gompa; For Drakar Treldzong Thösamling; For Thösam Yönten Dargyling; For Serdzong) It is part of the Gelug sect.

Located 30 kilometres (19 mi) to Xinghai's west, north-west, it has an elevation of 3,600 metres (11,800 ft). Rocky peaks can be seen from monastery's rear. It is in Drakar Treldzong, which is known as "Monkey Fort made of White Rocks". To accomplish what the previous position holder wanted, the third Arutsang Lama of Rongwo Monastery established the monastery in 1923. The monastery started a college in 1929. There were 300 monks living in the monastery in 1997 and 400 in 2002.

== Bibliography ==
- Gruschke, Andreas (2001). The Cultural Monuments of Tibet's Outer Provinces. Bangkok: White Lotus Press. pp. 91–92, 181, 258, 274. ISBN 9-789747-534597 – via Internet Archive.
