= Qapugtang =

- Town
- 萨呼腾镇
- Location of the city centre in Qinghai
- Coordinates: 32°54′N 95°18′E
- Country: People's Republic of China
- Province: Qinghai
- Elevation: 4,068.5 m (13,348 ft)

Population
  - Total: 7,000
- Time zone: UTC+8 (China Standard)

Qapugtang (Chinese: 萨呼腾; pinyin: Sàhūténg; Tibetan: བྱ་ཕུག་ཐང།) is a town in Zadoi County, Qinghai, China. The county seat of Zadoi is located in the Town of Qapugtang. Qapugtang has an altitude of about 4068.5 m.

Formerly known as Jiezha Township (结扎乡), Qapugtang Town was renamed in 2001. Qapugtang has a population of about 7000. Qapugtang is accessible through the Provincial Highway 309 of Qinghai. Qapugtang was in the affected area of the 2010 Yushu earthquake, and the reconstruction of Qapugtang was supported by Xining.
