= Hongliuyuan =

Town in Guazhou, Gansu, China

Coordinates: 40°50′N 94°45′E

Hongliuyuan (simplified Chinese: 红柳园; traditional Chinese: 紅柳園), also known as Liuyuan Town (柳园镇), is a District of Guazhou in Gansu province of China.

Hongliuyuan was the name of a post station in the area in ancient times. In 1958, Ministry of Railways of the People's Republic of China set up a railway station at this place, and changed the name to Liuyuan. In 1962, a town was founded and named as Liuyuan Town.

== Transport ==
- China National Highway 215
- China National Highway 312
