= Aksay Kazakh Autonomous County =

Aksay Kazakh Autonomous County 阿克塞哈萨克族自治县
- County

Name transcription(s)
  - Chinese: 阿克塞哈萨克族自治县
  - Kazakh: اقساي قازاق اۆتونوميالىق اۋدانى
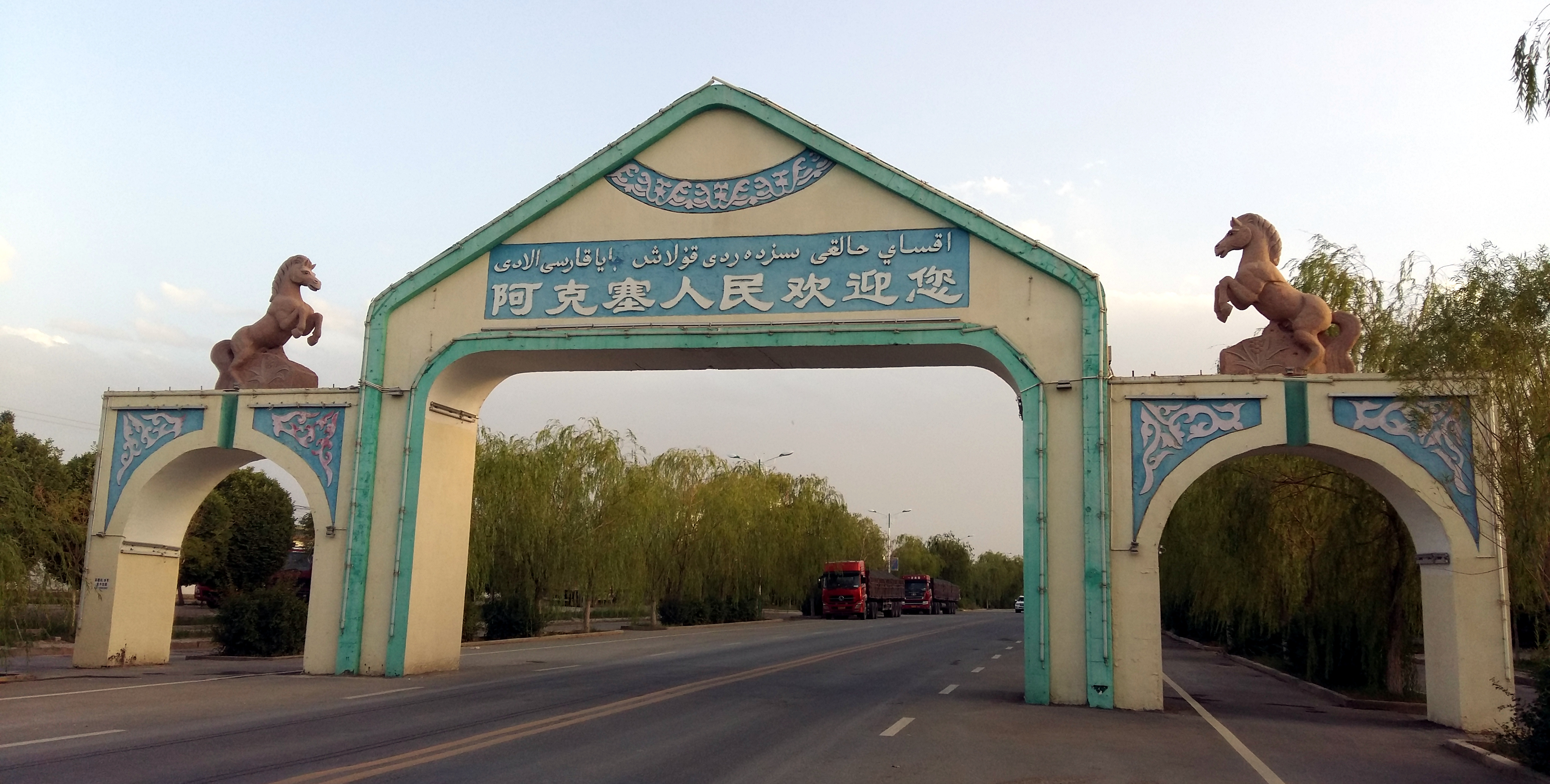

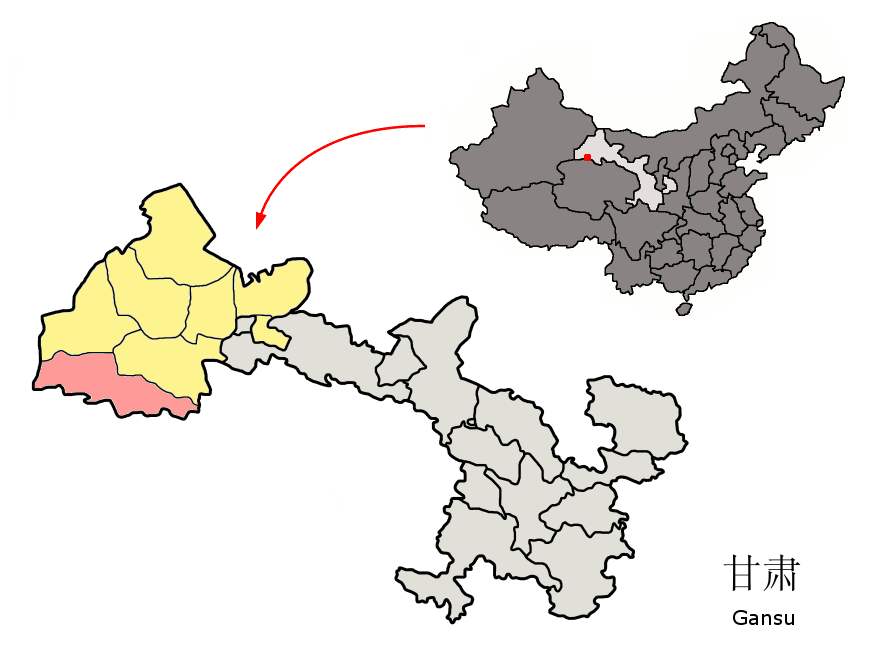
- Location of Aksay Kazak Autonomous County (pink) within Jiuquan City (yellow), Gansu Province (light grey) and the People's Republic of China (dark grey)

- Location of the seat in Gansu Aksai (China)
- Coordinates: 39°39′48″N 94°20′12″E
- Country: China
- Province: Gansu
- Prefecture-level city: Jiuquan
- County seat: Jengghelde (Hongliuwan)

Area
  - Total: 31,374 km^{2} (12,114 sq mi)

Population (2020)
  - Total: 10,970
  - Density: 0.3497/km^{2} (0.9056/sq mi)
- Time zone: UTC+8 (China Standard)
- Postal code: 736400
- Website: www.akesai.gov.cn

Aksay Kazakh Autonomous County

Chinese name
- Simplified Chinese: 阿克塞哈萨克族自治县
- Traditional Chinese: 阿克塞哈薩克族自治縣
Transcriptions
Standard Mandarin
- Hanyu Pinyin: Ākèsài Hāsàkèzú Zìzhìxiàn
Yue: Cantonese
- Jyutping: aa^{3}hak^{1}coi^{3} haa^{1}saat^{3}hak^{1}zuk^{6} zi^{6}zi^{6}jyun^{2}

Kazakh name
- Kazakh: اقسای قازاق اۆتونوميالىق اۋدانى; Ақсай Қазақ аутономиялық ауданы Aqsai Qazaq autonomialyq audany

Aksay Kazakh Autonomous County is an autonomous county under the prefecture-level city of Jiuquan in Gansu Province, China. The county borders Qinghai Province to the south and Xinjiang to the west.

The westernmost county-level division of Gansu, the county has an area of 32,374 km^{2} (12,500 sq mi) and a population of 10,545 as of 2010. The postal code is 736400.

== History ==
The Aksai Kazakh Autonomous Region Preparatory Committee was set up in 1953, south of Dunhuang. On April 26, 1954, the Aksai Kazak Autonomous Region was established. In 1955, it was renamed Aksai Kazakh Autonomous County.

== Geography ==
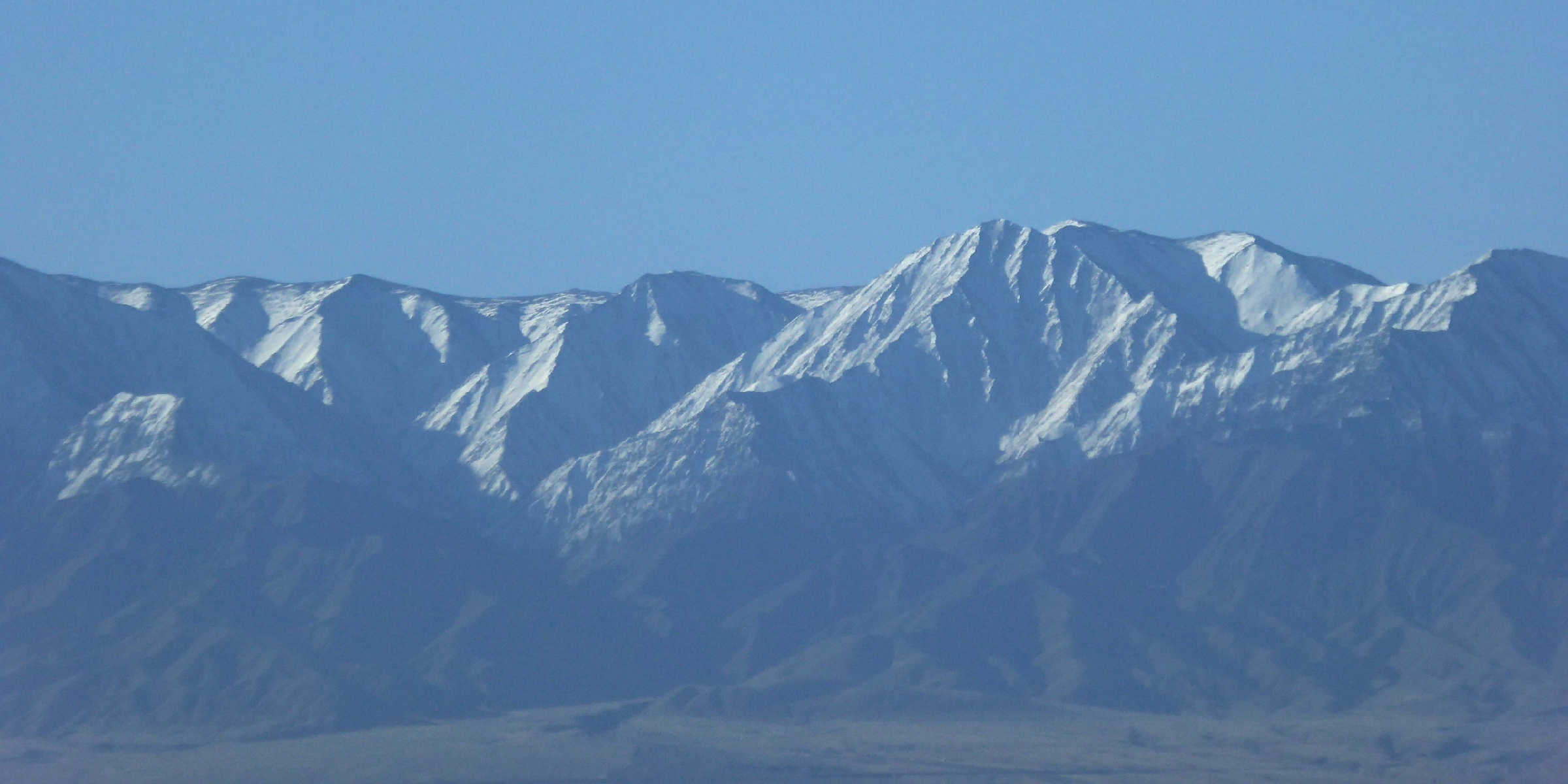
A view of the Altyn-Tagh mountains in Aksay

The county lies on the northern edge of the Tibetan Plateau and has an average elevation of about 3,200 meters.

The county is bordered by the city of Dunhuang to the north, Qinghai to the south, Subei Mongol Autonomous County to the east, and Xinjiang to the west.

The Big Harteng River (Chinese: 大哈尔腾河) and the Little Harteng River (Chinese: 小哈尔腾河) both flow through the southern portion of the county. The Sugan Lake, which actually comprises the Big Sugan Lake (Chinese: 大苏干湖) and the Little Sugan Lake (Chinese: 小苏干湖) is located in the county.

=== Climate ===
The county experiences an average annual rainfall of 100 millimetres or 4 inches, an average annual temperature of 5.4 °C or 41.7 °F and an annual frost-free period of 90 days.

== Administrative divisions ==
The county governs one town, three townships, and one other township-level division.

Name	Simplified Chinese	Hanyu Pinyin	Kazakh (Arabic script)	Kazakh (Cyrillic script)	Administrative division code
Town
Hongliuwan	红柳湾镇	Hóngliǔwān Zhèn	جىڭعىلدى قويناۋ قالاشىعى	Жыңғылды қаласы	620924100
Townships
Akqi Township	阿克旗乡	Ākèqí Xiāng	اقشي اۋىلى	Ақши ауылы	620924200
Alteng Township	阿勒腾乡	Ālèténg Xiāng	التىن اۋىلى	Алтын ауылы	620924203
Aina Township	阿伊纳乡	Āyīnà Xiāng	اينا اۋىلى	Айна ауылы	620924204
Other Township-level division
Aksay County Industrial Park	阿克塞县工业园区	Ākèsāi Xiàn Gōngyè Yuánqū			620924400

== Demographics ==
As of 2010, the county had a permanent population of 10,545, of which, 10,079 lived in Hongliuwan.

The county is the only Kazakh autonomous county in the province of Gansu. As of 2005, 41.3% of the county's population were ethnic Kazakhs, up slightly from the 40.7% recorded in 1996. Other ethnic groups in the county include the Han, the Hui, the Uighur, the Tibetans and 6 other ethnic minorities.

== Transport ==
China National Highway 215 passes through the county, as does Gansu Provincial Highway 314.

Golmud–Dunhuang Railway also passes through the county.
