= Gyêgu =

Gyêgu (Gyêgumdo)/Jiegu 结古镇 · སྐྱེ་དགུ་མདོ་རྡལ།
- Town
- Location in Qinghai
- Coordinates: 33.003°N 97.01°E
- Country: China
- Province: Qinghai
- Autonomous prefecture: Yushu Prefecture
- County-level city: Yushu City

Population
  - Major Nationalities: Tibetan
  - Regional dialect: Tibetan language
- Time zone: +8

Gyêgu

Chinese name
- Chinese: 结古
Transcriptions
Standard Mandarin
- Hanyu Pinyin: Jiégǔ

Alternative Chinese name
- Chinese: 结古多
- Postal: Jyekundo
Transcriptions
Standard Mandarin
- Hanyu Pinyin: Jiégǔduō

Tibetan name
- Tibetan: སྐྱེ་དགུ་མདོ་རྡལ།
Transcriptions
- Wylie: skye dgu mdo / skye rgu mdo
- Tibetan Pinyin: Gyêgudo

Gyêgu Subdistrict, formerly a part of the Gyêgu or Jiegu town is a township-level division in Yushu, Yushu TAP, Qinghai, China. The name Gyêgu is still a common name for the Yushu city proper, which include Gyêgu subdistrict and three other subdistricts evolved from the former Gyêgu town. The four subdistricts altogether forms a modern town which developed from the old Tibetan trade mart called Jyekundo or Gyêgumdo in Tibetan and most Western sources. The town is also referred to as Yushu, synonymous with the prefecture of Yushu and the city of Yushu.

== Name ==
The present name Gyêgu (Jiegu) (simplified Chinese: 结古镇; traditional Chinese: 結古鎮; pinyin: Jiégǔ Zhèn; also spelled Jyegu) is derived from Gyêgudo (སྐྱེ་དགུ་མདོ་, ZWPY: Gyêgumdo, Wylie: skye dgu mdo or skye rgu mdo; simplified Chinese: 结古多; traditional Chinese: 結古多; pinyin: Jiégǔduō).

The Tibetan designation Gyêgumdo indicates that it is a place where one valley opens into another one (mdo), here formed by two tributaries of the Batang River, Za Qu (rdza chu) and Bai Qu (Bä Qu, dpal chu). Since Gyêgu (skye dgu) also means men, mankind or all beings, the name could be interpreted as the ‘dwelling place of men at a valley junction’.

Chinese maps show the "main" river flowing through the town (coming from the south, and then turning to the east, toward the Tongtian River (Dri Chu), after taking on a tributary in Gyêgu) as the Batang River (巴塘河).

== Geography ==
Gyêgu (Jiegu) is located in the eastern Tibetan Plateau, at an elevation of 3,700 m (12,100 ft). The town is located in the Batang River (Zha Chu) valley, surrounded by mountains.

The town is reached by a two-day car ride on China National Highway 214 - a good, mostly metalled road leading all the way from Xining (820 km or 510 mi), the provincial capital, via the Sun and Moon Pass, Gonghe-Chabcha of Hainan prefecture and Madoi in Golog across the Bayankara Mountains. 25 km (16 mi) before arriving at Gyêgu, the Dri Chu (Yangtze River) is crossed.

In 2007 the construction of an airstrip was begun. The facility, named Yushu Batang Airport, was opened on August 1, 2009. Located 18 kilometers to the south of the town at 3,890 meters elevation about the sea level, it is the highest airport in Qinghai Province. The airport has a 3,800-meter-long runway and can receive A319 aircraft. The passenger terminal is designed to serve up to 80,000 passengers per year. The official 2009 statistics show that the airport served 7,484 passengers during 2009, the first (incomplete) year of its operation.

Given the fact that almost the entire area of the Yushu region is a realm of nomadic pastoralists, Gyêgu is one of the few places in this part of the vast Tibetan highlands where permanent settlement proved to provide a livelihood for Tibetan farmers and traders. Here, peasants grow barley on riverside fields.

== Significance as major trade mart ==
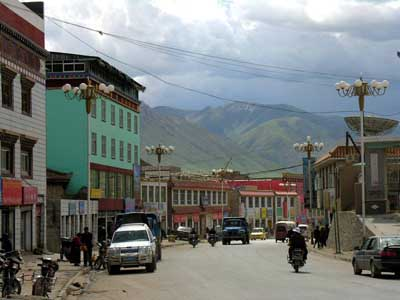
Street scene in Gyêgu (2005)

The significance of Gyêgu developed from its being an old trade hub, situated at the crossroads of important trade routes between Ya'an (formerly Yazhou) in China’s Sichuan province and Xining in Amdo’s heartland, as well as between Xining and Lhasa. In 1893 W.W. Rockhill stressed the strategic and commercial importance of the town:

...fairly good roads (for Tibet) radiate from it all over the country.[2] Commercially considered it is a distributing point for the Chinese trade in the northeastern part of K’amdo, and is the only town in that region where Chinese merchants are allowed to reside. (...)
The most important road starting from this point is that leading to Ta-chien-lu in Ssû-ch’uan, which I followed. Another leads across the steppes on the west to Nag ch’u-k’a, where it meets the ‘northern route’ (chang lam) from Hsi-ning, and thence reaches Lh’asa in nine days. Another leads to Ch’amdo, in about ten days. Still another passes by Tumbumdo and Tendo, and going through the Golok country comes to Sung-p’an t’ing in northwestern Ssû-ch’uan. The capital of Dérgé is reached from Jyékundo in six days, and from that town Bat’ang is only eight days farther south.

At that time, from one of the main tea trade centres in China's southwest, Ya'an in Sichuan, some 90,000 loads of tea bricks were carried annually to Gyêgu. More than half of those, 50,000 loads, continued to be transported to Lhasa and the Tibet Autonomous Region (TAR). The better qualities of tea were ordinarily taken on this Janglam, i.e. the northern route of the China trade route to Lhasa leading from Kangding via Dawu and Kardse to Gyêgu. The caravans doing trade here were led by well-dressed and well-mounted merchants. In the early 20th century, when trade was at its peak in Gyêgu, the town had a native population of about 100 Tibetan families—400 persons—plus 300 to 400 monks in Döndrub Ling monastery. The population doubled periodically with the advent of several hundred Han and Hui merchants from the TAR and Sichuan, with some Mongols from China's northwestern provinces of Shaanxi and Gansu.

== History and traditional culture ==
=== Monasticism ===
Gyêgu (Jiegu), like most parts of Yushu prefecture, is rich in Buddhist monasteries. Being a constituent of the local warlord or chieftain (Drawupon), one of the Twenty five chieftain under late Nangchen kingdom. the area was, for most of the time, not under domination by the Dalai Lama’s Gelugpa order in Lhasa. The different balance of power in this part of Kham enabled the older Tibetan Buddhist orders to prevail in Yushu, and thus Gyêgu.

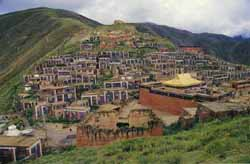
The main monastery in Yushu's Gyêgu township

The main lamasery in town is the Sakyapa monastery Doendrub Ling, commonly just called Yushu Gompa. Like at the beginning of the 20th century

Other nearby monastic sites include the important Karma-Kagyupa lamaseries Domkar Gompa and Thrangu Gompa, the famous Mahavairocana Temple (often called Wencheng Temple) and the popular religious site of Gyanamani with its billions of mani stones.

The 9th Panchen Lama died here. "It was only after the 13th Dalai Lama's death that IXth Panchen Lama was to return to Tibet. He died en route in Jyekundo on December 1, 1937."

Prior to collectivization in 1958, the entire monastic population of present-day Yushu TAP amounted to more than 25,000 Buddhist monks and nuns, with approximately 300 incarnate lamas among them. On the average about three to five per cent of the population were monastic, with a strikingly higher share in Nangqên county, where monks and nuns made up between 12 and 20% of the community.

=== Gyêgu Tibetan Khampa Festival ===
Since many different kinds of goods for trade and barter were brought in from all directions, the town became the residence of many of the richest families in the entire Tibetan highland. This wealth was and is demonstrated on two major occasions: the Tibetan New Year Festival and Gyêgu Horse Festival. The Horse Festival starts on each 25 July and lasts for several days. During the festival the colorful appliqué tents so typical for Tibetan summer outings cover the grasslands of the Bathang plain or the horse race grounds in the west of the town, with Khampas from all over Yushu prefecture, and even farther, showing off in between time and watching picturesque folk dances.

== 2010 earthquake ==
The 2010 Yushu earthquake struck Gyêgu on April 14. Gyêgu was reported to be the worst hit town, and most of the buildings were wrecked.

== Bibliography ==
- David-Néel, Alexandra, Grand Tibet; Au pays des brigands-gentilshommes (1933)
- Fernand Grenard: Tibet. The country and its inhabitants, London 1904 Reprint Delhi 1974.
- Andreas Gruschke: The Cultural Monuments of Tibet’s Outer Provinces: Kham, vol. 2: The Qinghai Part of Kham. Bangkok 2004, pp. 27–62.
- Hannue, Dialogues Tibetan Dialogues Han (2008)
- P.K. Kozlow: Through Eastern Tibet and Kam in: The Geographical Journal, vol. 31, London 1908.
- W.W. Rockhill, Diary of a Journey through Mongolia and Tibet in 1891 and 1892, Washington 1894
