= Bendu Township, Sichuan =

Bendu Township 奔都乡
- Township
- Benduxiang
- Location in Sichuan
- Coordinates: 28°36′47″N 99°18′6″E
- Country: People's Republic of China
- Province: Sichuan
- Autonomous prefecture: Garzê Tibetan Autonomous Prefecture
- County: Derong County

Area
  - Total: 353.2 km^{2} (136.4 sq mi)

Population (2010)
  - Total: 2,120
  - Density: 6.00/km^{2} (15.5/sq mi)
- Time zone: UTC+8 (China Standard)

Bendu (Mandarin: 奔都乡) is a township in Dêrong County, Garzê Tibetan Autonomous Prefecture, Sichuan, China. In 2010, Bendu Township had a total population of 2,120: 1,023 males and 1,097 females: 459 aged under 14, 1,461 aged between 15 and 65 and 200 aged over 65.

== See also ==
- List of township-level divisions of Sichuan
