= Yushu Batang Airport =

Yushu Batang Airport 玉树巴塘机场
- IATA: YUS; ICAO: ZLYS

Summary
- Airport type: Public
- Location: Yushu, Qinghai, China
- Elevation AMSL: 3,890 m / 12,762 ft
- Coordinates: 32°50′21″N 97°02′20″E

Map
- Location of airport in Qinghai

Runways
Direction	Length		Surface
Direction	m	ft	Surface
10/28	3,800	12,467	Concrete

Statistics (2025)
- Passengers: 405,531
- Aircraft movements: 4,100
- Cargo (metric tons): 1,095.3

Yushu Batang Airport
- Simplified Chinese: 玉树巴塘机场
- Traditional Chinese: 玉樹巴塘機場
Transcriptions
Standard Mandarin
- Hanyu Pinyin: Yùshù Bātáng Jīchǎng

Yushu Batang Airport (IATA: YUS, ICAO: ZLYS) is an airport serving Yushu City in Qinghai Province, China. It is located 18 kilometers to the south of the city center, Gyêgu, at 3,890 meters above the sea level, which makes it the highest civilian airport in Qinghai Province, and one of the highest in the world.

The construction of the airport started in 2007. The first aircraft landed at the new airport on May 29, 2009, and the airport was officially opened on August 1, 2009.

Yushu Batang Airport has a 3,800-meter-long runway, and can receive A319 aircraft. The passenger terminal is designed to serve up to 80,000 passengers per year. According to the CAAC statistics, the airport served 7,484 passengers during 2009, the first (incomplete) year of its operation.

The airport played an important role in the delivery of rescue personnel and relief supplies to the area affected by the 2010 Yushu earthquake. The facility was re-opened at noon on the day of the earthquake (Wednesday, April 14), and the first flight with personnel and supplies of the China International Earthquake Rescue Team landed there at 8 pm the same day.

== History ==
Located at an altitude of 3,900 meters in Batangtan, the Yushu Batang Airport has a tumultuous history of being built twice and abandoned twice. In August 2006, the airport site was confirmed. In January 2007, the State Council and the Central Military Commission officially approved the construction of the Yushu Batang Airport.

On May 16, 2007, a grand groundbreaking ceremony was held for Batang Airport in Yushu Tibetan Autonomous Prefecture, Qinghai Province, with a total investment of over 500 million yuan. The airport was designed as a 4C-class airport with a runway of 3,800 meters long and 45 meters wide, capable of handling aircraft such as the Airbus A319. During this construction project, many elderly people opposed it, believing that it would affect the surrounding pastures.

In 2008, the "Overall Plan for Qinghai Yushu Airport" was approved, with a near-term target capacity of 115,000 passengers by 2020 and a long-term target capacity of 280,000 passengers by 2040.

In August 2008, the Yushu Airport runway project was completed, and it opened to traffic on August 1, 2009, with the first flight using an A319 aircraft.

On April 14, 2010, a 7.1-magnitude earthquake struck Yushu. At that time, due to road damage, Yushu Airport, which had only been in operation for eight months, became the only rescue route. From the day after the earthquake, an average of more than 30 rescue flights, a large number of rescue personnel and disaster relief supplies arrived in Yushu every day.

Qinghai Airport Company started preliminary work on the airport expansion and renovation project in 2017. The project obtained the feasibility study approval on June 6, 2019, the preliminary design approval on August 14, and officially started construction on October 5 of that year.

In early March 2022, the flight area project of the Yushu Batang Airport expansion and renovation project passed the completion acceptance. After three years of construction and a total investment of 474 million yuan, the project was completed and put into operation on August 1, 2022, with 9 aircraft stands, 1 vertical connecting taxiway, and a 5,770-square-meter terminal building. On May 23, 2024, the expansion and renovation project of Qinghai Yushu Airport successfully passed the overall industry acceptance.

== Airlines and destinations ==
Airlines	Destinations
Beijing Capital Airlines	Beijing–Daxing, Xining
China Eastern Airlines	Chengdu–Tianfu, Xining
Tibet Airlines	Chengdu–Shuangliu, Lhasa, Xi'an, Xining

== See also ==
- List of airports in China
- List of the busiest airports in China
- List of highest airports
