= Batang River (Sichuan) =

Tributary of Yangtze River

The Batang (Chinese: 巴塘河, p Batánghé) or Ba Chu (Chinese: 巴曲, p Baqū; Tibetan: དཔལ་ཆུ།, w Dpal Chu, z Bä Qu) is an 140-kilometer (87 mi) long river in Sichuan province in the People's Republic of China. It is located near Batang town (巴塘镇), not the Batang township (巴搪乡) near Gyêgu in Qinghai.

The Batang is a tributary of the Yangtze river system. The main course of the river is the Jinsha, into which the Batang empties. Its watershed covers 3,100 square kilometers (1,200 sq mi); its average flow is 54 m^{3} per second.
