= Dêrong County =

Dêrong County 得荣县 • སྡེ་རོང་རྫོང་། Derong
- County
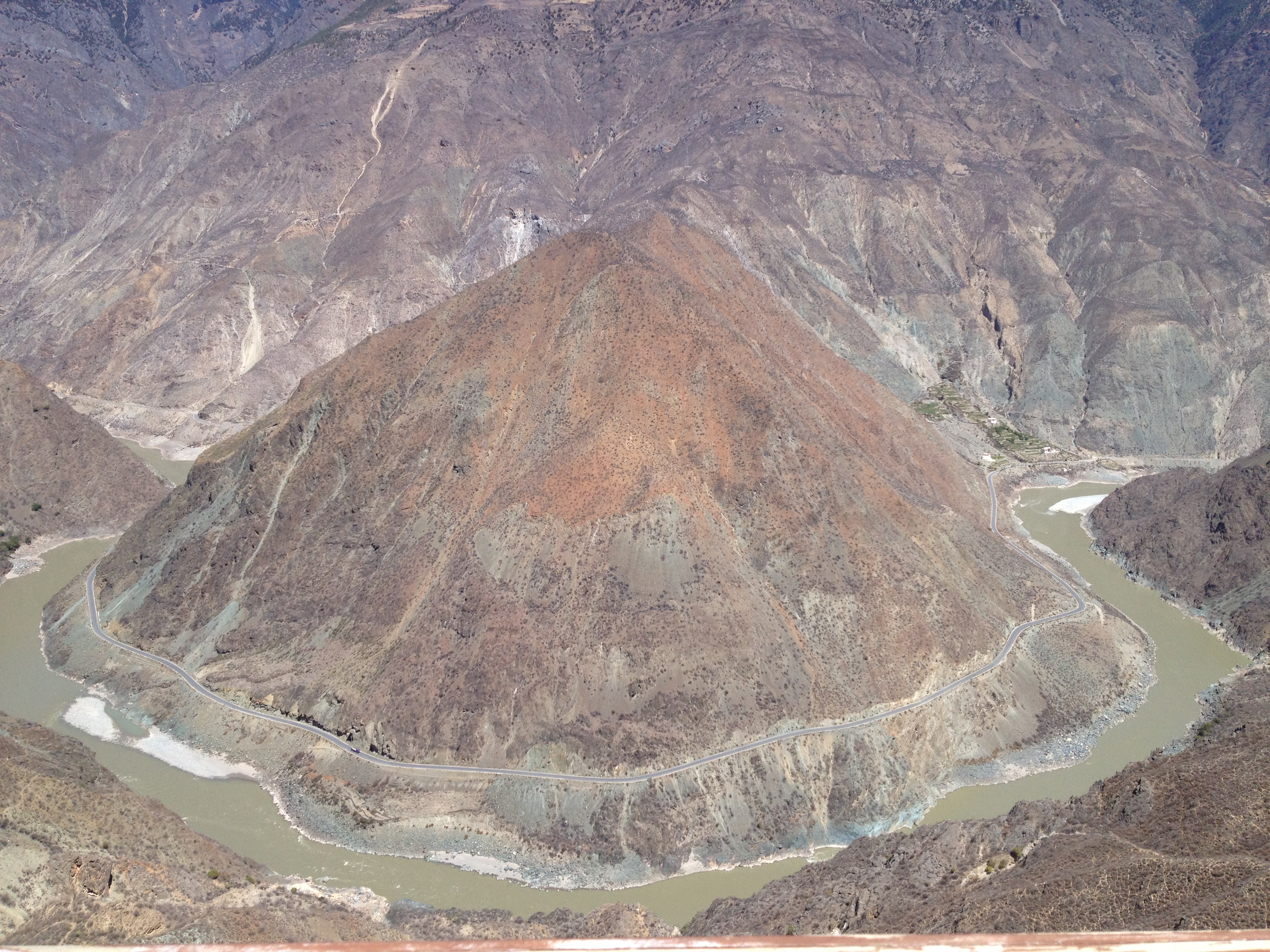
- A bend on the Jinsha River in Dêrong County on the border between Sichuan and Yunan.

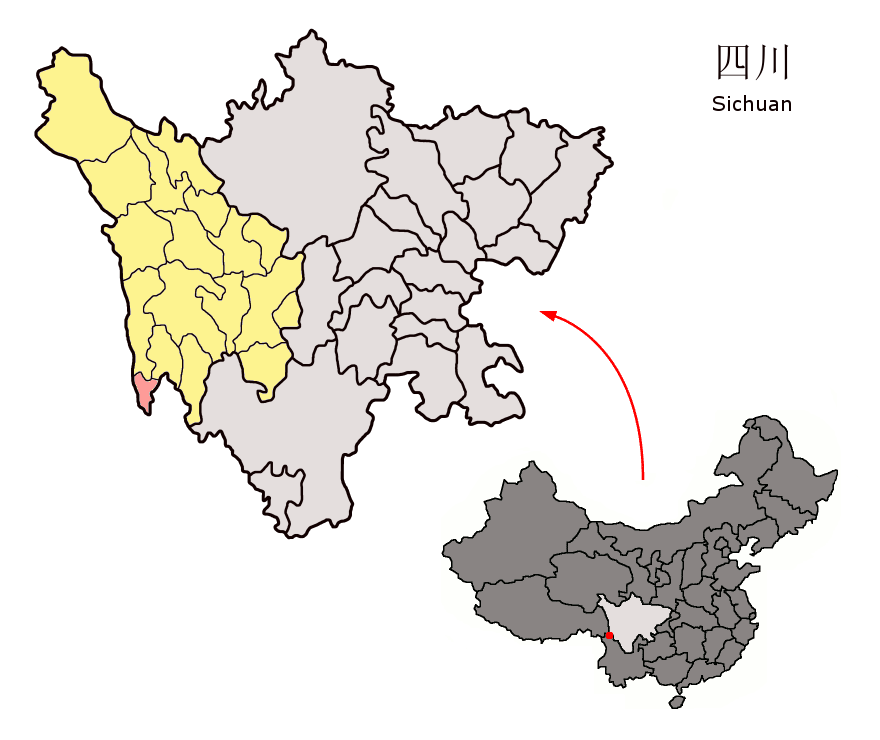
- Location of the county (red) in Garzê Prefecture (yellow) and Sichuan province

- Location of the seat in Sichuan Dêrong (China)
- Coordinates: 28°44′N 99°17′E
- Country: China
- Province: Sichuan
- Autonomous prefecture: Garzê
- County seat: Waka

Area
  - Total: 2,916 km^{2} (1,126 sq mi)

Population (2020)
  - Total: 24,748
  - Density: 8.487/km^{2} (21.98/sq mi)
- Time zone: UTC+8 (China Standard)
- Website: www.gzdr.gov.cn

Dêrong County

Chinese name
- Simplified Chinese: 得荣县
- Traditional Chinese: 得榮縣
Transcriptions
Standard Mandarin
- Hanyu Pinyin: Déróng Xiàn
Yue: Cantonese
- Jyutping: dak^{1}wing^{4} jyun^{2}

Tibetan name
- Tibetan: སྡེ་རོང་རྫོང་།
Transcriptions
- Wylie: sde rong rdzong
- Tibetan Pinyin: Dêrong Zong

Dêrong County (Tibetan: སྡེ་རོང་རྫོང་།; Chinese: 得荣县) is a county in the southwest of Sichuan Province, China, bordering Yunnan province to the east, south, and west. It is under the administration of the Garzê Tibetan Autonomous Prefecture.

== Administrative divisions ==
Dêrong County is divided into 4 towns and 6 townships.

Name	Simplified Chinese	Hanyu Pinyin	Tibetan	Wylie	Administrative division code
Towns
Waka Town	瓦卡镇	Wǎkǎ Zhèn	ཝ་ཁ་གྲོང་རྡལ།	wa kha grong rdal	513338101
Bünsum Town (Baisong)	白松镇	Báisōng Zhèn	སྤུན་གསུམ་གྲོང་རྡལ།	spun gsum grong rdal	513338102
Siyü Town (Riyu)	日雨镇	Rìyǔ Zhèn	གཟི་ཡུལ་གྲོང་རྡལ།	gzi yul grong rdal	513338103
Nyimailungba Town (Taiyanggu)	太阳谷镇	Tàiyánggǔ Zhèn	ཉི་མའི་ལུང་པ་གྲོང་རྡལ།	nyi ma'i lung pa grong rdal	513338104
Townships
Yulung Township (Xulong)	徐龙乡	Xúlóng Xiāng	གཡུ་ལུང་ཤང་།	g.yu lung shang	513338201
Bündo Township (Bendu)	奔都乡	Bēndū Xiāng	པུ་མདོ་ཤང་།	pu mdo shang	513338204
Bündo Township (Bari)	八日乡	Bārì Xiāng	ཕག་རི་ཤང་།	phag ri shang	513338205
Gêxoi Township (Guxue)	古学乡	Gǔxué Xiāng	སྐེད་ཤོད་ཤང་།	sked shod shang	513338206
Gongpo Township (Gangbo, Gongbo)	贡波乡	Gòngbō Xiāng	སྒོང་ཕོ་ཤང་།	sgong pho shang	513338208
Ciu Township (Ciwu)	茨巫乡	Cíwū Xiāng	ཚེའུ་ཤང་།	tshe'u shang	513338210

== Climate ==
Climate data for Dêrong, elevation 2,423 m (7,949 ft), (1991–2020 normals, extremes 1981–present)
Month	Jan	Feb	Mar	Apr	May	Jun	Jul	Aug	Sep	Oct	Nov	Dec	Year
Record high °C (°F)	25.1 (77.2)	25.9 (78.6)	29.2 (84.6)	31.8 (89.2)	34.2 (93.6)	36.3 (97.3)	36.0 (96.8)	33.6 (92.5)	33.5 (92.3)	30.1 (86.2)	27.6 (81.7)	22.8 (73.0)	36.3 (97.3)
Mean daily maximum °C (°F)	15.1 (59.2)	17.4 (63.3)	19.9 (67.8)	23.1 (73.6)	26.9 (80.4)	30.1 (86.2)	28.5 (83.3)	27.3 (81.1)	26.9 (80.4)	24.1 (75.4)	19.6 (67.3)	15.8 (60.4)	22.9 (73.2)
Daily mean °C (°F)	6.1 (43.0)	8.9 (48.0)	12.0 (53.6)	15.5 (59.9)	19.6 (67.3)	23.0 (73.4)	21.7 (71.1)	20.4 (68.7)	19.8 (67.6)	16.1 (61.0)	10.5 (50.9)	6.4 (43.5)	15.0 (59.0)
Mean daily minimum °C (°F)	−0.5 (31.1)	2.0 (35.6)	5.6 (42.1)	9.2 (48.6)	13.5 (56.3)	17.4 (63.3)	17.1 (62.8)	16.0 (60.8)	14.8 (58.6)	10.0 (50.0)	4.0 (39.2)	−0.1 (31.8)	9.1 (48.4)
Record low °C (°F)	−8.9 (16.0)	−5.2 (22.6)	−1.0 (30.2)	2.1 (35.8)	3.6 (38.5)	10.2 (50.4)	6.6 (43.9)	11.4 (52.5)	7.6 (45.7)	2.1 (35.8)	−1.9 (28.6)	−7.7 (18.1)	−8.9 (16.0)
Average precipitation mm (inches)	1.3 (0.05)	1.5 (0.06)	4.4 (0.17)	6.8 (0.27)	18.6 (0.73)	39.1 (1.54)	126.8 (4.99)	111.1 (4.37)	35.3 (1.39)	9.1 (0.36)	3.3 (0.13)	0.4 (0.02)	357.7 (14.08)
Average precipitation days (≥ 0.1 mm)	1.0	1.2	2.6	4.1	5.4	9.3	18.7	17.9	9.2	3.5	1.2	0.4	74.5
Average snowy days	1.2	0.7	0.2	0	0	0	0	0	0	0	0.1	0.2	2.4
Average relative humidity (%)	34	33	35	38	40	45	61	67	58	47	40	35	44
Mean monthly sunshine hours	174.1	163.2	178.3	169.0	174.0	154.1	121.7	118.8	125.8	163.0	170.3	175.5	1,887.8
Percentage possible sunshine	53	51	48	44	41	37	29	29	34	46	53	55	43
Source: China Meteorological Administrationall-time November record high
