= Chen Xiaonan =

Chinese television host

Chen Xiaonan (Chinese: 陳曉楠) (born November 13, 1973) is a Chinese talk show host. Chen Xiaonan began working at Beijing Television and CCTV in 1994, and joined Phoenix Television at 2000.

== See also ==
- A Date with Luyu
