= Batang River =

River in China

Coordinates: 32°58′43″N 97°14′36″E

The Batang River (Chinese: 巴塘河, p Batánghé) or Zha Chu (Chinese: 札曲, p Zháqū; Standard Tibetan: Za Qu), whose two sources are Za Qu (w rdza Chu, z Za Qu) and Bai Qu (Tibetan: དཔལ་ཆུ།, w Dpal Chu, z Bä Qu), is an 88-kilometre (55 mi) long river in Yushu Tibetan Autonomous Prefecture, south-eastern Qinghai province, in the People's Republic of China. The river begins in the highlands of central Yushu County and flows easterly through the townships of Batang (巴塘乡) and Gyêgu before meeting the Tongtian River at the border of Yushu County with Chindu County. The Tongtian is the main stem of the Yangtze River, and its confluence with the Batang is traditionally considered to mark the beginning of the Jinsha section of the Yangtze. The Batang River's watershed covers 2,466 square kilometres (952 sq mi) and its average flow is 29 m³ per second.
