= Zadoi County =

Zadoi County 杂多县 · རྫ་སྟོད་རྫོང་། Dzatö, Dzatoe, Zaduo
- County
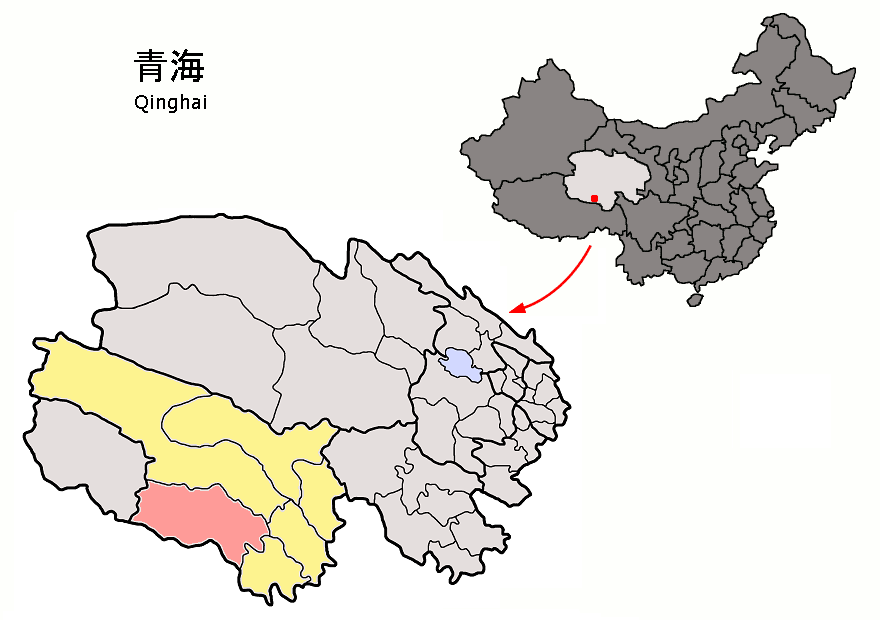
- Location of Zadoi County (red) within Yushu Prefecture (yellow) and Qinghai

- Location of the seat in Qinghai
- Coordinates: 32°53′36″N 95°18′03″E
- Country: China
- Province: Qinghai
- Autonomous prefecture: Yushu
- County seat: Qapugtang

Area
  - Total: 35,000 km^{2} (14,000 sq mi)

Population (2020)
  - Total: 68,759
  - Density: 2.0/km^{2} (5.1/sq mi)
- Time zone: UTC+8 (China Standard)
- Postal code: 815399
- Website: www.zaduo.gov.cn

Zadoi County

Chinese name
- Simplified Chinese: 杂多县
- Traditional Chinese: 雜多縣
Transcriptions
Standard Mandarin
- Hanyu Pinyin: Záduō Xiàn

Tibetan name
- Tibetan: རྫ་སྟོད་རྫོང་།
Transcriptions
- Wylie: rdza stod rdzong
- Tibetan Pinyin: Zadoi Zong

Zadoi County (Tibetan: རྫ་སྟོད་རྫོང་།; Chinese: 杂多县) is a county in the southwest of Qinghai Province, China, bordering the Tibet Autonomous Region to the south. It is under the administration of Yushu Tibetan Autonomous Prefecture. The county seat is in the Town of Qapugtang.

== Administrative divisions ==
Zadoi County is divided to 1 town and 7 townships.

Name	Simplified Chinese	Hanyu Pinyin	Tibetan	Wylie	Administrative division code
Town
Qapugtang Town (Sahuteng)	萨呼腾镇	Sàhūténg Zhèn	བྱ་ཕུག་ཐང་གྲོང་བརྡལ།	bya phug thang grong brdal	632722100
Townships
Namsai Township (Angsai)	昂赛乡	Ángsài Xiāng	གནམ་སྲས་ཞང་།	gnam sras zhang	632722200
Gyêdoi Township (Jieduo)	结多乡	Jiéduō Xiāng	ལྕི་སྟོད་ཞང་།	gnam sras zhang	632722201
Adoi Township (Aduo)	阿多乡	Āduō Xiāng	ཨ་སྟོད་ཞང་།	a stod zhang	632722202
Qirug Township (Suru, Surug)	苏鲁乡	Sūlǔ Xiāng	ཕྱི་རུག་ཞང་།	phyi rug zhang	632722203
Chadam Township (Chadan)	查旦乡	Chádàn Xiāng	ཁྲ་འདམ་ཞང་།	khra 'dam zhang	632722204
Mugxung Township (Moyun)	莫云乡	Mòyún Xiāng	སྨུག་གཞུང་ཞང་།	smug gzhung zhang	632722205
Zaqên Township (Zhaqing)	扎青乡	Zhāqīng Xiāng	རྫ་ཆེན་ཞང་།	rdza chen zhang	632722206

== Climate ==
Climate data for Zadoi, elevation 4,066 m (13,340 ft), (1991–2020 normals, extremes 1981–2010)
Month	Jan	Feb	Mar	Apr	May	Jun	Jul	Aug	Sep	Oct	Nov	Dec	Year
Record high °C (°F)	11.2 (52.2)	10.1 (50.2)	15.1 (59.2)	17.4 (63.3)	23.4 (74.1)	25.2 (77.4)	25.6 (78.1)	24.5 (76.1)	22.1 (71.8)	19.5 (67.1)	12.7 (54.9)	9.3 (48.7)	25.6 (78.1)
Mean daily maximum °C (°F)	−1.8 (28.8)	0.9 (33.6)	4.8 (40.6)	9.1 (48.4)	12.9 (55.2)	15.9 (60.6)	18.5 (65.3)	18.4 (65.1)	15.5 (59.9)	9.5 (49.1)	4.2 (39.6)	0.4 (32.7)	9.0 (48.2)
Daily mean °C (°F)	−10.1 (13.8)	−6.8 (19.8)	−2.7 (27.1)	1.6 (34.9)	5.6 (42.1)	9.3 (48.7)	11.6 (52.9)	11.2 (52.2)	8.1 (46.6)	2.0 (35.6)	−4.1 (24.6)	−8.5 (16.7)	1.4 (34.6)
Mean daily minimum °C (°F)	−16.9 (1.6)	−13.7 (7.3)	−9.1 (15.6)	−4.5 (23.9)	0.0 (32.0)	4.4 (39.9)	6.4 (43.5)	5.9 (42.6)	3.2 (37.8)	−3.1 (26.4)	−10.2 (13.6)	−15.4 (4.3)	−4.4 (24.0)
Record low °C (°F)	−34.4 (−29.9)	−31.3 (−24.3)	−26.2 (−15.2)	−17.8 (0.0)	−12.3 (9.9)	−6.6 (20.1)	−4.4 (24.1)	−7.7 (18.1)	−8.1 (17.4)	−22.1 (−7.8)	−25.5 (−13.9)	−34.9 (−30.8)	−34.9 (−30.8)
Average precipitation mm (inches)	9.4 (0.37)	7.8 (0.31)	10.3 (0.41)	18.0 (0.71)	56.8 (2.24)	122.4 (4.82)	106.2 (4.18)	96.5 (3.80)	76.2 (3.00)	28.0 (1.10)	4.4 (0.17)	3.9 (0.15)	539.9 (21.26)
Average precipitation days (≥ 0.1 mm)	6.8	6.4	8.3	11.2	17.9	23.0	21.1	20.4	19.7	12.2	4.2	4.0	155.2
Average snowy days	8.6	8.5	11.3	14.3	13.3	2.8	0.5	0.4	2.2	12.8	6.3	5.2	86.2
Average relative humidity (%)	48	44	44	49	58	67	66	67	68	60	47	42	55
Mean monthly sunshine hours	173.9	163.4	182.3	202.4	212.0	190.4	218.6	210.0	199.8	212.1	207.2	185.4	2,357.5
Percentage possible sunshine	54	52	49	52	49	45	51	51	55	61	67	60	54
Source: China Meteorological Administration

== Gallery ==
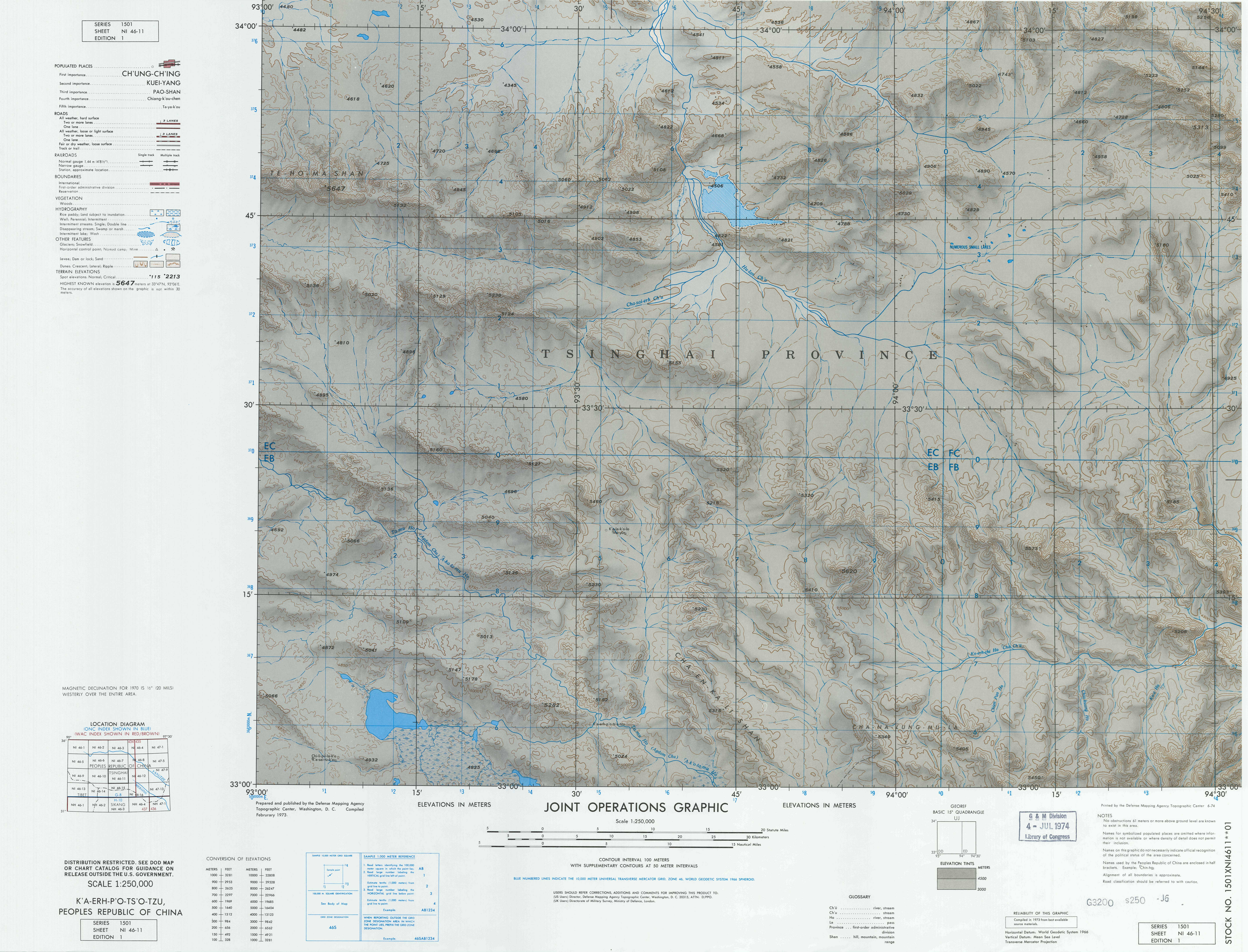

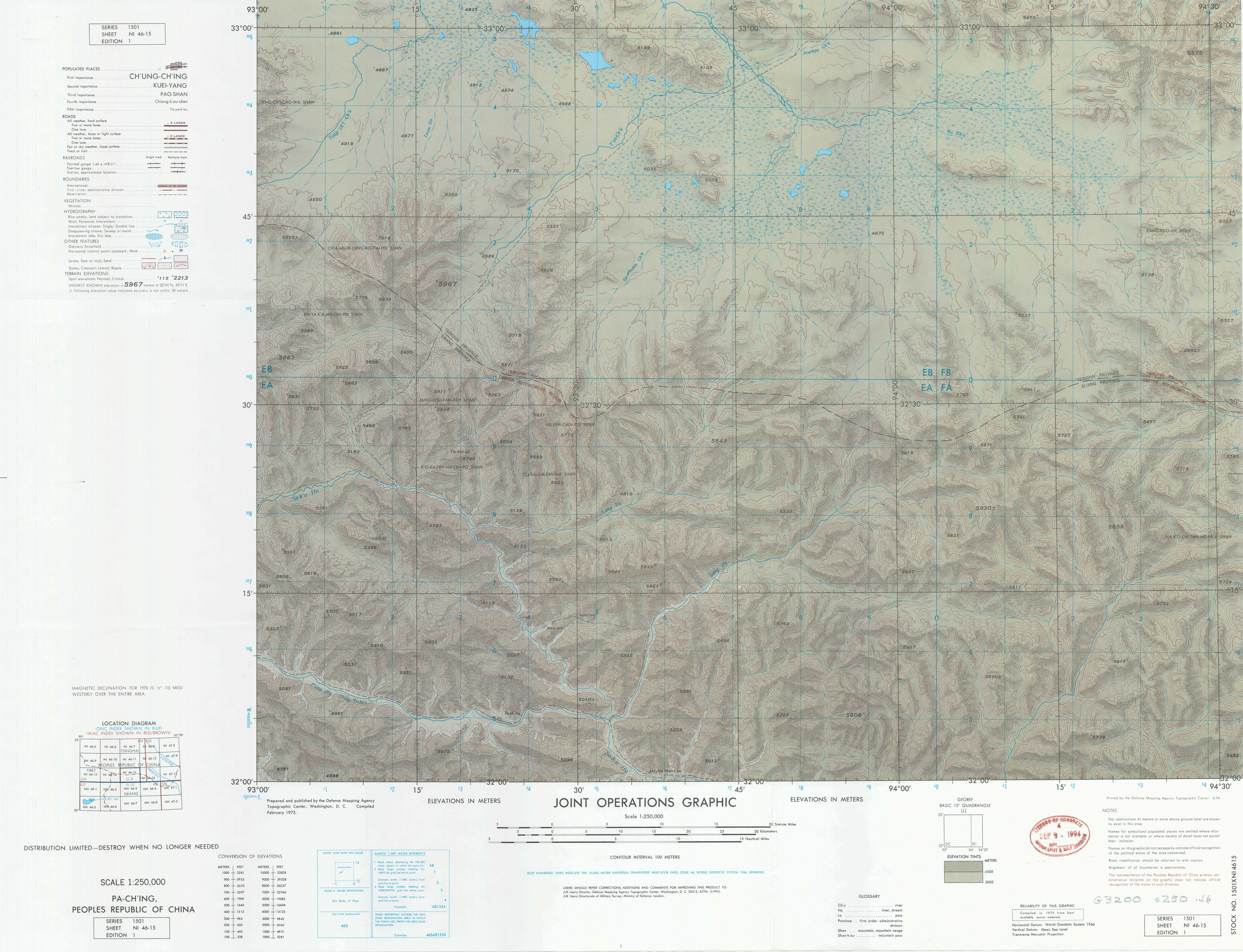

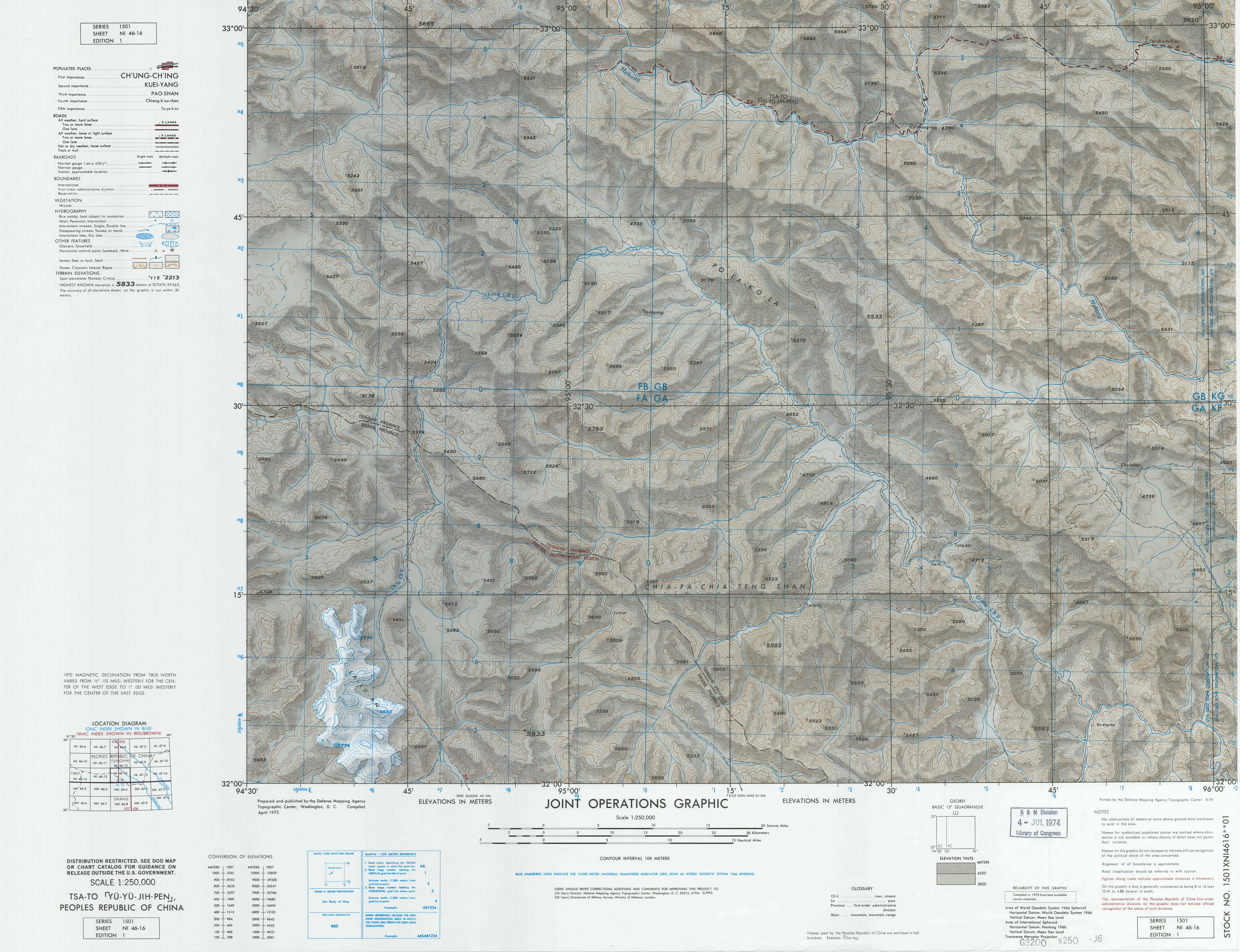
