= Andreas Gruschke =

German author, photographer and Tibet researcher

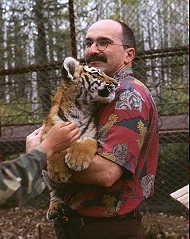

Andreas Gruschke (April 16, 1960 in Tengen-Blumenfeld – January 30, 2018) was a German author, photographer and Tibet researcher. His scientific background was that of a geographer, Sinologist and ethnologist. He received a 1990 M.A. at Albert-Ludwigs-Universität Freiburg, and a Ph.D. in 2009 at Leipzig University.

From 1987, Gruschke worked as a free-lance writer and picture-journalist with the main topics Tibet, Himalayas, Silk Road and East Asia. He held lectures and seminars at his hometown Freiburg and other places. After finishing his university studies, he went on numerous research trips to Southeast Asia, China, Korea, Central Asia, yet most of them led him to the highland of Tibet. From 2004 to 2012 he worked at Leipzig University, doing research on Tibetan pastoralists in eastern Tibet's Yushu area. From 2012, he was a guest professor at the Institute of Social Development and Western China Development Studies at Sichuan University, Chengdu, China. His main research interest was the livelihood security of the rural population, namely pastoralists, in China's Tibetan areas.

Gruschke published numerous books and articles mainly on Tibetan culture, among them pioneering works for monasteries in the East Tibetan regions Amdo and Kham. Other books and reports deal with Korea and the Himalayas and China, as well as two picture albums about his homeland: the Hegau and the upper Rhine. His most recent research was about nomads in the eastern Tibetan region of Yushu (northern Kham).

== Works ==
- The Cultural Monuments of Tibet’s Outer Provinces: Amdo, 2 vols., Bangkok 2001
- The Cultural Monuments of Tibet’s Outer Provinces: Kham, 2 vols., Bangkok 2004 ff.
- "Nomads Without Pastures? Globalization, Regionalization, and Livelihood Security of Nomads and Former Nomads in Northern Khams," in: Ken Bauer, Geoff Childs, Andrew Fischer, and Daniel Winkler (eds.), In the Shadow of the Leaping Dragon: Demography, Development, and the Environment in Tibetan Areas, in: JIATS, 4 (December 2008). Download pdf
- A Vital Monastic Centre of the Jonang Tradition: The Grand Lamasery of Dzamthang, in: 《China Tibetology》 中国藏学(英文版) 2008年01期
- "Nomads and their Market Relations in Eastern Tibet’s Yushu Region: The Impact of Caterpillar Fungus." In: Jörg Gertel & Richard LeHeron(eds.): Economic Spaces of Pastoral Production and Commodity Systems. Markets and Livelihoods. Ashgate: Farnham - Burlington 2011, pp. 211–229.
- Yushu Nomads on the Move. How can the Use of Pastoralist Resources be Sustainable?. In: 人文视野下的 高原生态国际学术研讨会.交流材料 [Renwenshi Yexia De Gaoyuan Shengtai Guoji Xueshu Yantaohui. Jiaoliu Cailiao]. The International Symposium on the Human Dimensions of Ecological Conservation on the Tibetan Plateau. Communication Materials of Conference. Xining, Qinghai, China, August 2011. pp. 138–152.
- From Yak Herders to Yartsa Traders. Tibetan Nomads and New Market Options in Qinghai´s Yushu Region. In: 《China Tibetology》 中国藏学(英文版, 2011, No. 3, pp. 95–118.
- "Tibetan Pastoralists in Transition. Political Change and State Interventions in Nomad Societies." In: Hermann Kreutzmann (ed.): Pastoral Practices in High Asia. Agency of ‘Development’ Effected by Modernisation, Resettlement and Transformation (Advances in Asian Human-Environmental Research). Springer: Dordrecht 2012, pp. 273–289.
