= Yushu Tibetan Autonomous Prefecture =

Yushu Prefecture 玉树州 · ཡུལ་ཤུལ་ཁུལ།
- Autonomous prefecture
- 玉树藏族自治州 · ཡུལ་ཤུལ་བོད་རིགས་རང་སྐྱོང་ཁུལ།Yushu Tibetan Autonomous Prefecture
- Location of Yushu Tibetan Autonomous Prefecture in Qinghai
- Coordinates (Yushu Prefecture government (Yushu City)): 33.01°N 97.01°E
- Country: China
- Province: Qinghai
- Prefectural seat: Gyêgu, Yushu City

Government
  - Type: Autonomous prefecture
  - CCP Secretary: Wu Dejun
  - Congress Chairman: Zhou Hongyuan
  - Governor: Cering Tai
  - CPPCC Chairman: Gaisang

Area
  - Total: 204,887 km^{2} (79,107 sq mi)
- Elevation: 3,689 m (12,103 ft)

Population
  - Total: 425,000
  - Density: 2.07/km^{2} (5.37/sq mi)

GDP
  - Total: CN¥ 6.1 billion US$ 1.0 billion
  - Per capita: CN¥ 15,149; US$ 2,432
- Time zone: UTC+8 (China Standard)
- ISO 3166 code: CN-QH-27
- Licence Plate Prefix: 青G

Yushu Tibetan Autonomous Prefecture

Chinese name
- Simplified Chinese: 玉树藏族自治州
- Traditional Chinese: 玉樹藏族自治州
Transcriptions
Standard Mandarin
- Hanyu Pinyin: Yùshù Zàngzú Zìzhìzhōu
- IPA: [ŷʂû tsâŋtsǔ tsîʈʂîʈʂóʊ]

Tibetan name
- Tibetan: ཡུལ་ཤུལ་བོད་རིགས་རང་སྐྱོང་ཁུལ།
Transcriptions
- Wylie: yul-shul bod-rigs rang-skyong-khul yus-hru'u bod-rigs rang-skyong-khul
- Tibetan Pinyin: Yüxü Poirig Ranggyong Kü; Yüshu Poirig Ranggyong Kü

Yushu Tibetan Autonomous Prefecture (Tibetan: ཡུལ་ཤུལ་བོད་རིགས་རང་སྐྱོང་ཁུལ།, ZWPY: Yüxü Poirig Ranggyong Kü, Chinese: 玉树藏族自治州; pinyin: Yùshù Zàngzú Zìzhìzhōu, retranscribed into Tibetan as ཡུལ་ཤུལ།), also transliterated as Yüxü or Yulshul, is an autonomous prefecture of Southwestern Qinghai Province, China. Largely inhabited by Tibetans, the prefecture has an area of 188,794 square kilometres (72,894 sq mi) and its seat is located in the town of Gyêgu in Yushu County, which is the place of the old Tibetan trade mart of Jyekundo. The official source of the Yellow River lies within the prefecture. Historically, the area belongs to the cultural realm of Kham in Eastern Tibet.

On 14 April 2010, an earthquake struck the prefecture, registering a magnitude of 6.9 (USGS, EMSC) or 7.1 (Xinhua). It originated in the Yushu Tibetan Autonomous Prefecture, at 07:49 local time.

== History and traditional culture ==
=== Monasticism ===
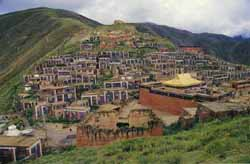
The main monastery in Yushu's Gyêgu township

Yushu prefecture is rich in Tibetan Buddhist monasteries. Being a constituent of the former Nangchen kingdom, the area was, for most of the time, not under domination by the Dalai Lama's Gelugpa order in Lhasa. The different balance of power in this part of Kham enabled the older Tibetan Buddhist orders to prevail in Yushu. Of the 195 pre-1958 lamaseries only 23 belonged to the Gelugpa.

An overwhelming majority of more than 100 monasteries followed and still follow the teachings of the various Kagyupa schools, with some of their sub-sects only found in this part of Tibet. The Sakyapa were and are also strong in Yushu, with many of their 32 monasteries being among the most significant in Kham. The Nyingmapa's monastic institutions amount to about the same number, while the Bönpo are only met with in one lamasery they share with the Nyingmapa.

Prior to collectivization in 1958, the entire monastic population of present-day Yushu TAP amounted to more than 25,000 Buddhist monks and nuns, with approximately 300 incarnate lamas among them. On the average about three to five per cent of the population were monastic, with a strikingly higher share in Nangchen county, where monks and nuns made up between 12 and 20% of the community.

== Geography ==
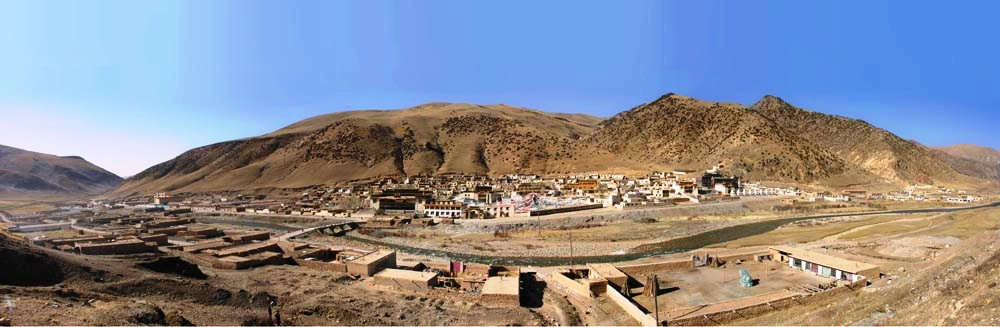
Xia Laxiu village in Yushu county

Yushu Prefecture occupies most of the southwestern third of Qinghai, with the exception of the province's extreme southwestern corner (Tanggulashan Town), which is an exclave of the Haixi Mongol and Tibetan Autonomous Prefecture. Almost all of the prefecture is located in the uppermost part of the basins of three of Asia's great rivers - the Yellow River, the Yangtze, and the Mekong, although in the remote areas of the far west of the prefecture (the Hoh Xil plateau), and along its northern borders, there are some endorheic basins as well. A significant portion of the prefecture's territory is incorporated into the Sanjiangyuan National Nature Reserve, intended to protect the headwaters of the three great rivers.

Most of the prefecture's population lives in its southeastern part: primarily in the valley of the upper Yangtze (whose section within the prefecture is known in Chinese as the Tongtian River, in Tibetan as Drichu འབྲི་ཆུ།), and some also in the valley of the Mekong (the Dzachu རྫ་ཆུ། (扎曲) River). The highlands away from these two rivers, as well as the western part of the prefecture, have very little population.

=== Climate ===
With elevations above 3,600 metres (12,000 ft), the prefecture has a harsh climate, with long, cold winters, and short, rainy, and cool to warm summers. Specifically, in the Köppen system, the prefecture ranges from the alpine variation of the subarctic climate (Köppen Dwc), to a full alpine climate (Köppen EH), to a semi-arid climate (Köppen BSk). Most of the annual precipitation occurs from June to September, when on average, a majority of the days each month has some rainfall. The annual mean temperature in Yushu County, at an elevation of 3,690 metres (12,110 ft), is 3.22 °C (37.8 °F) and in Qumarlêb, in the northeast of the prefecture at 4,190 m (13,750 ft) elevation, −2.13 °C (28.2 °F). Sunshine is generous, ranging from around 2500 hours in the prefecture seat to 2780 hours in Qumarlêb.

Climate data for Yushu, elevation 3,717 m (12,195 ft), (1991–2020 normals, extremes 1951–present)
Month	Jan	Feb	Mar	Apr	May	Jun	Jul	Aug	Sep	Oct	Nov	Dec	Year
Record high °C (°F)	17.6 (63.7)	15.6 (60.1)	23.9 (75.0)	26.1 (79.0)	34.1 (93.4)	35.7 (96.3)	36.8 (98.2)	34.4 (93.9)	33.7 (92.7)	25.2 (77.4)	18.5 (65.3)	15.0 (59.0)	36.8 (98.2)
Mean maximum °C (°F)	9.5 (49.1)	11.0 (51.8)	15.4 (59.7)	18.9 (66.0)	22.5 (72.5)	25.0 (77.0)	25.8 (78.4)	25.7 (78.3)	23.7 (74.7)	19.9 (67.8)	12.6 (54.7)	9.9 (49.8)	26.9 (80.4)
Mean daily maximum °C (°F)	2.5 (36.5)	5.2 (41.4)	8.8 (47.8)	12.6 (54.7)	16.0 (60.8)	18.8 (65.8)	20.9 (69.6)	20.8 (69.4)	18.0 (64.4)	12.4 (54.3)	7.8 (46.0)	4.0 (39.2)	12.3 (54.2)
Daily mean °C (°F)	−6.9 (19.6)	−3.6 (25.5)	0.4 (32.7)	4.4 (39.9)	8.3 (46.9)	11.5 (52.7)	13.5 (56.3)	12.9 (55.2)	9.8 (49.6)	4.0 (39.2)	−1.7 (28.9)	−6.0 (21.2)	3.9 (39.0)
Mean daily minimum °C (°F)	−14.5 (5.9)	−10.9 (12.4)	−6.4 (20.5)	−2.2 (28.0)	2.0 (35.6)	6.1 (43.0)	7.7 (45.9)	6.9 (44.4)	4.5 (40.1)	−1.5 (29.3)	−8.5 (16.7)	−13.6 (7.5)	−2.5 (27.4)
Mean minimum °C (°F)	−20.9 (−5.6)	−18.2 (−0.8)	−13.6 (7.5)	−7.9 (17.8)	−3.3 (26.1)	0.5 (32.9)	2.2 (36.0)	1.2 (34.2)	−1.8 (28.8)	−8.2 (17.2)	−14.7 (5.5)	−19.9 (−3.8)	−21.7 (−7.1)
Record low °C (°F)	−30.0 (−22.0)	−28.3 (−18.9)	−19.5 (−3.1)	−12.8 (9.0)	−11.6 (11.1)	−4.8 (23.4)	−1.9 (28.6)	−2.3 (27.9)	−7.9 (17.8)	−14.3 (6.3)	−21.7 (−7.1)	−27.6 (−17.7)	−30.0 (−22.0)
Average precipitation mm (inches)	4.3 (0.17)	4.8 (0.19)	10.3 (0.41)	19.1 (0.75)	57.3 (2.26)	103.2 (4.06)	93.1 (3.67)	85.6 (3.37)	77.7 (3.06)	32.9 (1.30)	3.4 (0.13)	2.3 (0.09)	494 (19.46)
Average precipitation days (≥ 0.1 mm)	3.9	4.4	6.4	11.5	17.8	22.3	19.7	18.6	19.6	12.9	3.5	2.2	142.8
Average snowy days	5.9	7.3	10.0	13.4	5.4	0.7	0.1	0.1	0.5	9.6	5.8	3.9	62.7
Average relative humidity (%)	42	40	41	48	55	64	65	65	68	63	48	41	53
Mean monthly sunshine hours	185.7	182.0	215.3	224.5	222.9	194.2	218.2	213.1	188.6	187.6	198.2	194.4	2,424.7
Percentage possible sunshine	58	58	58	57	52	45	50	52	52	54	64	63	55
Source: China Meteorological AdministrationAll-time Nov Record low

Climate data for Qumarlêb, elevation 4,175 m (13,698 ft), (1991–2020 normals, extremes 1971–2010)
Month	Jan	Feb	Mar	Apr	May	Jun	Jul	Aug	Sep	Oct	Nov	Dec	Year
Record high °C (°F)	10.3 (50.5)	9.9 (49.8)	13.7 (56.7)	16.8 (62.2)	21.6 (70.9)	24.1 (75.4)	24.9 (76.8)	25.6 (78.1)	20.8 (69.4)	19.0 (66.2)	11.0 (51.8)	8.9 (48.0)	25.6 (78.1)
Mean daily maximum °C (°F)	−3.8 (25.2)	−1.0 (30.2)	2.7 (36.9)	7.1 (44.8)	10.7 (51.3)	13.7 (56.7)	16.4 (61.5)	16.3 (61.3)	12.8 (55.0)	6.9 (44.4)	1.3 (34.3)	−2.2 (28.0)	6.7 (44.1)
Daily mean °C (°F)	−12.8 (9.0)	−9.5 (14.9)	−5.4 (22.3)	−0.7 (30.7)	3.5 (38.3)	7.2 (45.0)	9.7 (49.5)	9.3 (48.7)	5.7 (42.3)	−0.9 (30.4)	−7.8 (18.0)	−12.1 (10.2)	−1.2 (29.9)
Mean daily minimum °C (°F)	−20.8 (−5.4)	−17.6 (0.3)	−13.0 (8.6)	−7.9 (17.8)	−2.9 (26.8)	1.8 (35.2)	4.0 (39.2)	3.4 (38.1)	0.6 (33.1)	−6.5 (20.3)	−14.8 (5.4)	−20.0 (−4.0)	−7.8 (18.0)
Record low °C (°F)	−34.2 (−29.6)	−31.2 (−24.2)	−27.1 (−16.8)	−19.9 (−3.8)	−14.9 (5.2)	−6.4 (20.5)	−4.3 (24.3)	−9.5 (14.9)	−10.2 (13.6)	−24.0 (−11.2)	−28.4 (−19.1)	−34.4 (−29.9)	−34.4 (−29.9)
Average precipitation mm (inches)	4.4 (0.17)	3.2 (0.13)	7.8 (0.31)	14.8 (0.58)	39.4 (1.55)	85.8 (3.38)	96.6 (3.80)	79.0 (3.11)	71.3 (2.81)	20.5 (0.81)	3.6 (0.14)	1.7 (0.07)	428.1 (16.86)
Average precipitation days (≥ 0.1 mm)	4.7	5.4	7.9	10.3	17.3	21.6	19.4	17.8	19.8	11.5	3.5	2.9	142.1
Average snowy days	6.8	7.5	11.2	13.5	19.2	7.3	1.6	1.5	7.9	13.6	5.5	4.8	100.4
Average relative humidity (%)	43	39	42	47	57	66	66	66	70	61	49	42	54
Mean monthly sunshine hours	205.4	190.9	219.9	234.9	232.6	203.3	232.7	225.1	206.0	233.7	230.8	224.1	2,639.4
Percentage possible sunshine	65	61	59	60	54	47	53	55	56	68	75	73	61
Source: China Meteorological Administration

== Subdivisions ==
The prefecture is subdivided into six county-level divisions, composing 5 counties and 1 County-level city:

Map
#	Name	Hanzi	Hanyu Pinyin	Tibetan	Wylie Tibetan Pinyin	Population (2010 Census)	Area (km^{2})	Density (/km^{2})
1	Yushu City	玉树市	Yùshù Shì	ཡུལ་ཤུལ་གྲོང་ཁྱེར།	yul shul grong khyer Yüxü Chongkyir	120,447	13,462	8.94
2	Zadoi County (Zaduo County)	杂多县	Záduō Xiàn	རྫ་སྟོད་རྫོང་།	rdza stod rdzong Zadoi Zong	58,268	33,333	1.74
3	Chindu County (Chenduo County)	称多县	Chènduō Xiàn	ཁྲི་འདུ་རྫོང་།	khri 'du rdzong Chindu Zong	55,619	13,793	4.03
4	Zhidoi County (Zhiduo County)	治多县	Zhìduō Xiàn	འབྲི་སྟོད་རྫོང་།	'bri stod rdzong Zhidoi Zong	30,037	66,667	0.45
5	Nangqên County (Nangqian County)	囊谦县	Nángqiān Xiàn	ནང་ཆེན་རྫོང་།	nang chen rdzong Nangqên Zong	85,825	11,539	7.43
6	Qumarlêb County (Qumalai County)	曲麻莱县	Qūmálái Xiàn	ཆུ་དམར་ལེབ་རྫོང་།	chu dmar leb rdzong Qumarlêb Zong	28,243	50,000	0.56

== Economy ==
Agricultural produce of Yushu includes trees, wheat and millet including black Highland barley.

== Transportation ==
The eastern part of the prefecture, where most of its population lives, is served by the China National Highway 214 and the recently constructed (opened 2009) Yushu Batang Airport. In 2017 the G0613 Xining–Lijiang Expressway was completed, connecting the region to Hainan Tibetan Autonomous Prefecture and Xining.

The far western part of the prefecture, which is hundreds of kilometers away from the prefecture's eastern "core", and has very little population, is crossed by China National Highway 109 and the Qinghai-Tibet Railway.

== Population ==
Ethnic groups in Yushu, according to 2005 Yushu Statistical Yearbook:

Nationality	Population	Percentage
Tibetan	288,829	97.25%
Han	7,594	2.56%
Hui	295	0.1%
Tu/Monguor	138	<0.1%
Salar	64	<0.1%
Mongol	50	<0.1%
Manchu	22	<0.01%
Others	12	<0.01%

This statistics only includes the registered population, not the floating population which is estimated at 50–60,000 for the entire prefecture.
