= Qumarlêb County =

Qumarlêb County 曲麻莱县 · ཆུ་དམར་ལེབ་རྫོང་།
- County
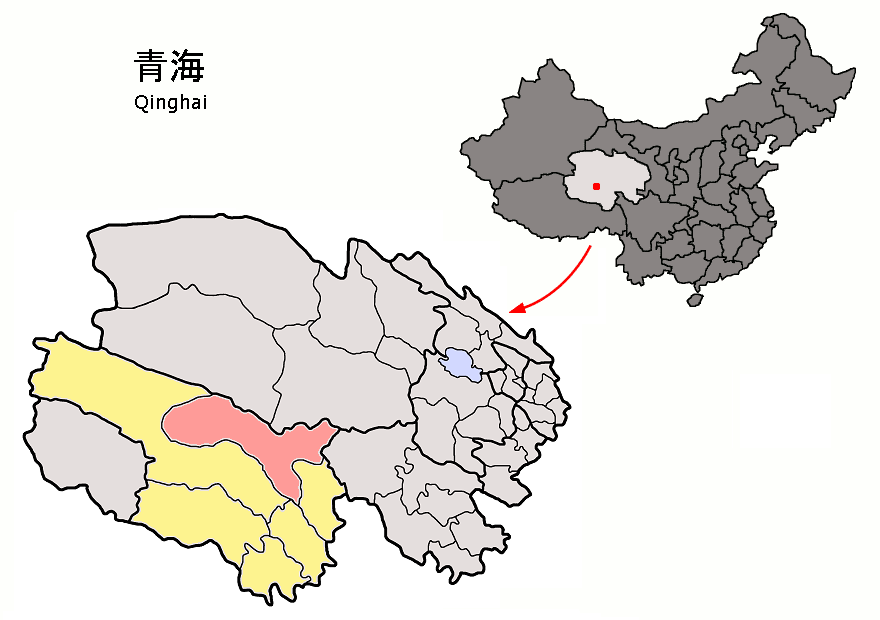
- Location of Qumarlêb County (red) in Yushu Prefecture (yellow) and Qinghai

- Location of the seat in Qinghai
- Coordinates: 34°08′N 95°48′E
- Country: China
- Province: Qinghai
- Autonomous prefecture: Yushu
- County seat: Yugê Town

Area
  - Total: 47,000 km^{2} (18,000 sq mi)
- Elevation: 4,191 m (13,750 ft)

Population (2020)
  - Total: 33,710
  - Density: 0.72/km^{2} (1.9/sq mi)
- Time zone: UTC+8 (China Standard)
- Postal code: 815500
- Website: www.qumalai.gov.cn

Qumarlêb County

Chinese name
- Simplified Chinese: 曲麻莱县
- Traditional Chinese: 曲麻萊縣
Transcriptions
Standard Mandarin
- Hanyu Pinyin: Qūmálái Xiàn

Tibetan name
- Tibetan: ཆུ་དམར་ལེབ་རྫོང་།
Transcriptions
- Wylie: chu dmar leb rdzong
- Tibetan Pinyin: Qumarlêb Zong

Qumarlêb County (Tibetan: ཆུ་དམར་ལེབ་རྫོང་།; Chinese: 曲麻莱县) is a county in the northeast of the Yushu Tibetan Autonomous Prefecture, south-central Qinghai province, China.

== Geography and climate ==
With an elevation of around 4,200 metres (14,000 ft), Qumarlêb County has an alpine climate (Köppen ETH), with long, frigid winters, and short, cool and rainy summers. Average low temperatures are below freezing from mid September to late May and below −17.8 °C or 0 °F from early December to mid-February. However, due to the wide diurnal temperature variation, average highs are only below freezing from mid/late November until early March. Despite frequent rain during summer, when a majority of days sees rain, no month has less than 50 percent of possible sunshine; with monthly percent possible sunshine ranging from 51 percent in June to 78 percent in November, the county seat receives 2,782 hours of bright sunshine annually. The monthly 24-hour average temperature ranges from −12.8 °C (9.0 °F) in January to 9.7 °C (49.5 °F) in July, while the annual mean is −1.2 °C (29.8 °F). Over three-fourths of the annual precipitation of 406 mm (16.0 in) is delivered from June to September.

Affected by global warming, the rate of temperature increase has increased significantly in the past 10 years. In August 2022, the hottest month in history was recorded, with an average temperature of 13.9 °C (57.0 °F), and the highest temperature ever recorded was 25.6 °C (78.1 °F) on the 9th of that month. There was also an 21.1 °C (70.0 °F) average high in August 2016.

Climate data for Qumarlêb, elevation 4,175 m (13,698 ft), (1991–2020 normals, extremes 1971–2010)
Month	Jan	Feb	Mar	Apr	May	Jun	Jul	Aug	Sep	Oct	Nov	Dec	Year
Record high °C (°F)	10.3 (50.5)	9.9 (49.8)	13.7 (56.7)	16.8 (62.2)	21.6 (70.9)	24.1 (75.4)	24.9 (76.8)	25.6 (78.1)	20.8 (69.4)	19.0 (66.2)	11.0 (51.8)	8.9 (48.0)	25.6 (78.1)
Mean daily maximum °C (°F)	−3.8 (25.2)	−1.0 (30.2)	2.7 (36.9)	7.1 (44.8)	10.7 (51.3)	13.7 (56.7)	16.4 (61.5)	16.3 (61.3)	12.8 (55.0)	6.9 (44.4)	1.3 (34.3)	−2.2 (28.0)	6.7 (44.1)
Daily mean °C (°F)	−12.8 (9.0)	−9.5 (14.9)	−5.4 (22.3)	−0.7 (30.7)	3.5 (38.3)	7.2 (45.0)	9.7 (49.5)	9.3 (48.7)	5.7 (42.3)	−0.9 (30.4)	−7.8 (18.0)	−12.1 (10.2)	−1.2 (29.9)
Mean daily minimum °C (°F)	−20.8 (−5.4)	−17.6 (0.3)	−13.0 (8.6)	−7.9 (17.8)	−2.9 (26.8)	1.8 (35.2)	4.0 (39.2)	3.4 (38.1)	0.6 (33.1)	−6.5 (20.3)	−14.8 (5.4)	−20.0 (−4.0)	−7.8 (18.0)
Record low °C (°F)	−34.2 (−29.6)	−31.2 (−24.2)	−27.1 (−16.8)	−19.9 (−3.8)	−14.9 (5.2)	−6.4 (20.5)	−4.3 (24.3)	−9.5 (14.9)	−10.2 (13.6)	−24.0 (−11.2)	−28.4 (−19.1)	−34.4 (−29.9)	−34.4 (−29.9)
Average precipitation mm (inches)	4.4 (0.17)	3.2 (0.13)	7.8 (0.31)	14.8 (0.58)	39.4 (1.55)	85.8 (3.38)	96.6 (3.80)	79.0 (3.11)	71.3 (2.81)	20.5 (0.81)	3.6 (0.14)	1.7 (0.07)	428.1 (16.86)
Average precipitation days (≥ 0.1 mm)	4.7	5.4	7.9	10.3	17.3	21.6	19.4	17.8	19.8	11.5	3.5	2.9	142.1
Average snowy days	6.8	7.5	11.2	13.5	19.2	7.3	1.6	1.5	7.9	13.6	5.5	4.8	100.4
Average relative humidity (%)	43	39	42	47	57	66	66	66	70	61	49	42	54
Mean monthly sunshine hours	205.4	190.9	219.9	234.9	232.6	203.3	232.7	225.1	206.0	233.7	230.8	224.1	2,639.4
Percentage possible sunshine	65	61	59	60	54	47	53	55	56	68	75	73	61
Source: China Meteorological Administration

== Administrative divisions ==
Qumarlêb County is divided to 1 town and 5 townships.

Name	Simplified Chinese	Hanyu Pinyin	Tibetan	Wylie	Administrative division code
Town
Yugê Town (Yuegai)	约改镇	Yuēgǎi Zhèn	གཡུ་སྐེ་གྲོང་བརྡལ།	g.yu ske grong brdal	632726100
Townships
Bagoin Township (Bagan)	巴干乡	Bāgàn Xiāng	འབའ་དགོན་ཞང་།	'ba' dgon zhang	632726200
Qigzhi Township (Qiuzhi)	秋智乡	Qiūzhì Xiāng	ཆིག་སྒྲིལ་ཞང་།	chig sgril zhang	632726201
Yugê Township (Yege)	叶格乡	Yègé Xiāng	གཡུ་སྐེ་ཞང་།	g.yu ske zhang	632726202
Madoi Township (Maduo)	麻多乡	Máduō Xiāng	རྨ་སྟོད་ཞང་།	rma stod zhang	632726203
Qumar Township (Qumahe)	曲麻河乡	Qǔmáhé Xiāng	ཆུ་དམར་ཞང་།	chu dmar zhang	632726204

== Gallery ==
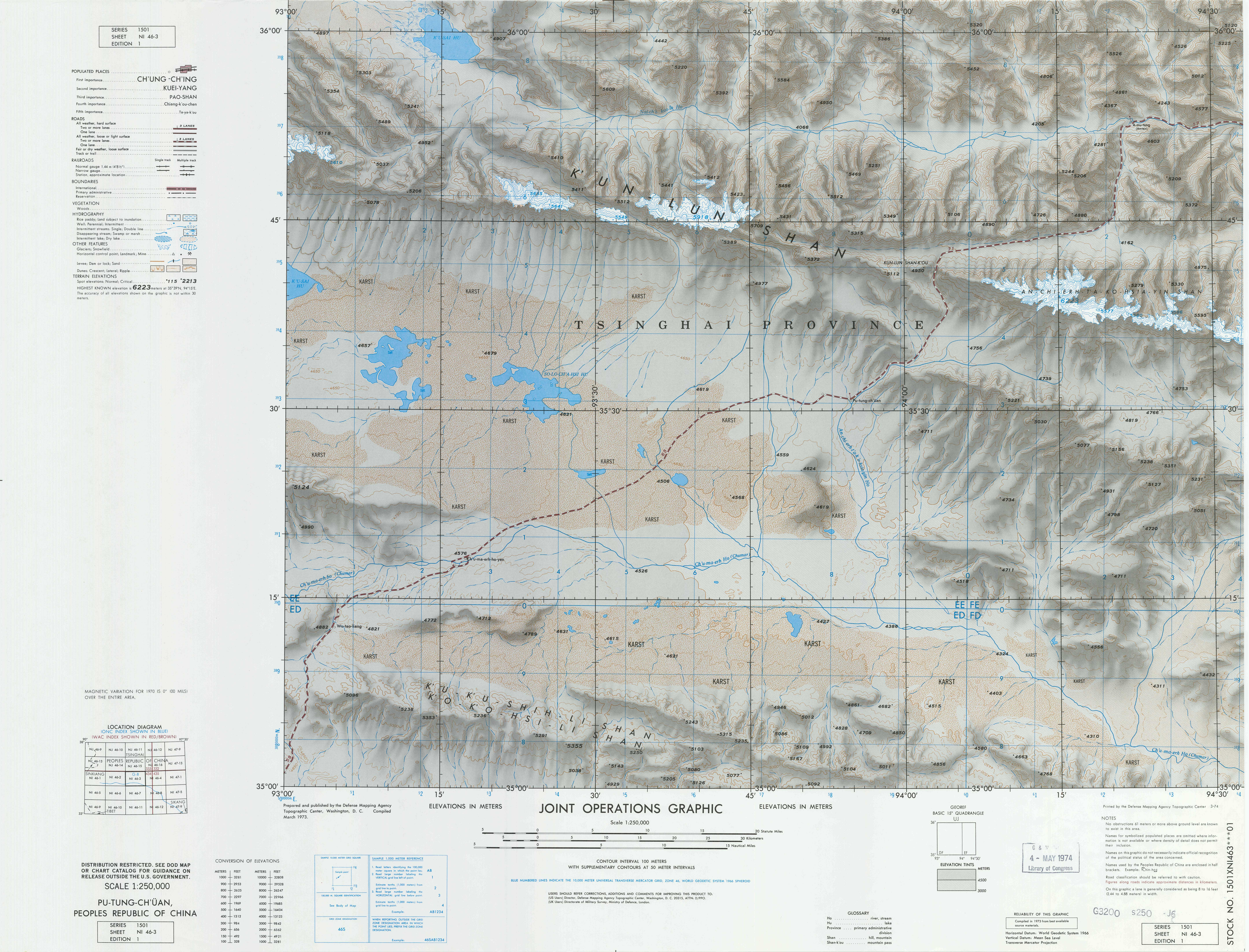

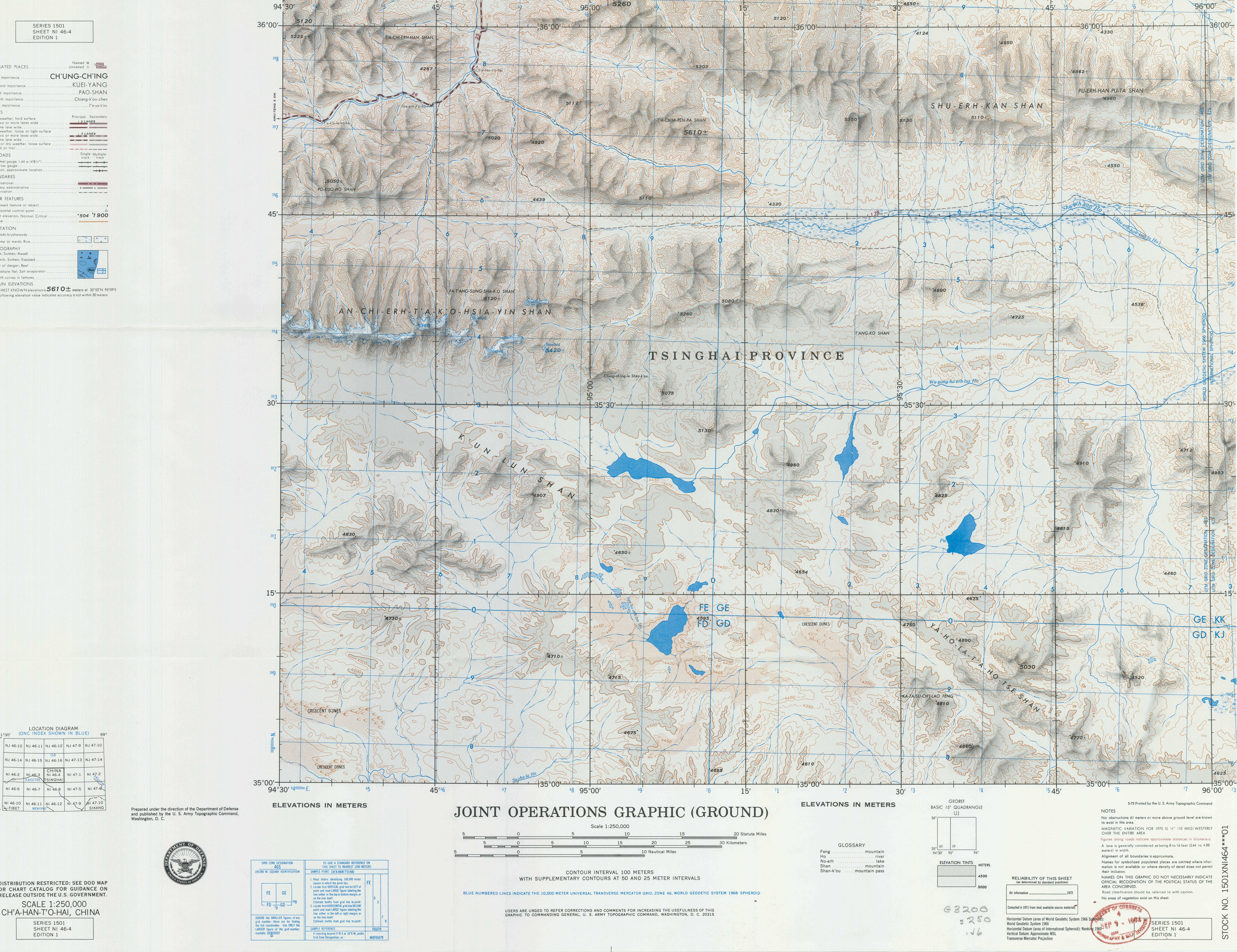
