= Yushu City, Qinghai =

Yushu 玉树市 · ཡུལ་ཤུལ་གྲོང་ཁྱེར།
- County-level city
- Yüxü
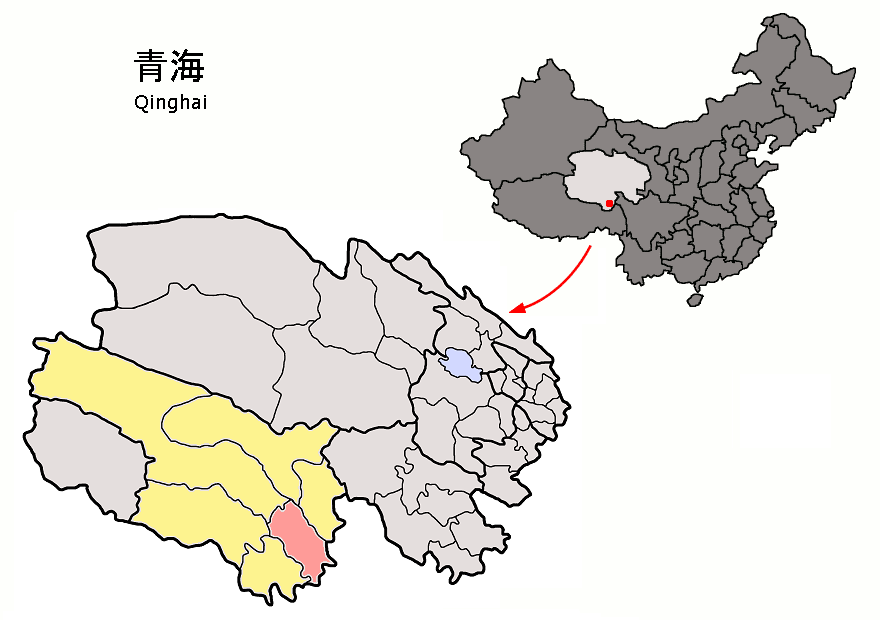
- Yushu (red) in Yushu Tibetan Autonomous Prefecture (yellow) and Qinghai

- Location of the seat in Qinghai
- Coordinates: 33°00′1.434″N 97°00′23.544″E
- Country: China
- Province: Qinghai
- Autonomous prefecture: Yushu
- Municipal seat: Gyêgu

Area
  - Total: 13,462 km^{2} (5,198 sq mi)
- Elevation: 3,689 m (12,103 ft)

Population (2020)
  - Total: 141,308
  - Density: 10.497/km^{2} (27.187/sq mi)
- Time zone: UTC+8 (China Standard)
- Postal code: 815000
- Area code: 0976
- Website: www.yushushi.gov.cn

Yushu City, Qinghai

Chinese name
- Simplified Chinese: 玉树市
- Traditional Chinese: 玉樹市
Transcriptions
Standard Mandarin
- Hanyu Pinyin: Yùshù Shì

Tibetan name
- Tibetan: ཡུལ་ཤུལ་གྲོང་ཁྱེར། or ཡུས་ཧྲུའུ་གྲོང་ཁྱེར།
Transcriptions
- Wylie: yul shul grong khyer or yus hruʼu grong khyer
- Tibetan Pinyin: Yüxü Chongkyêr or Yüshu Chongkyêr

Yushu (Tibetan: ཡུལ་ཤུལ་གྲོང་ཁྱེར།, Chinese: 玉树市), also Romanized as Yüxü, is a county-level city of Yushu Tibetan Autonomous Prefecture in Southern Qinghai Province, China. It comprises a surface area of 13,462 square kilometres (5,198 sq mi). In 2010, the overall city's population was 120,447 and 56,802 live within the city core. There are around 356,000 people in the metropolitan area in 2020. Yushu is the fourth largest city in Qinghai.

The city seat is the town of Gyêgu (also known as Yushu and Jiegu in Chinese), built in the valley of the Batang River, a right tributary of the Tongtian, which becomes the Jinsha at their confluence. All of these makeups part of the Yangtze watershed. In fact, almost the entire area of Yushu Tibetan Autonomous Prefecture is nomadic pastureland, except for Yushu city.

== History ==
Yushu is one of the oldest towns in Qinghai, and has historically served as a major hub for regional trade. It is situated at the crossroads of the important trade routes between Ya’an, Xining, and Lhasa. In the early days, Chinese traders brought tea bricks from Sichuan and transported them to other parts of the Tibetan regions such as Lhasa, Chamdo, and Golok, which were the best-known towns during that time.

During the late 20th century, government officials encouraged traditionally nomadic merchants to settle down in Qinghai, including in Yushu, through measures such as low taxes and rents. A 1995 research paper estimated that these merchants, which included many Hui traders of the Tibetan Plateau, comprised about one-third of Yushu's population.

In 2010, Yushu was severely impacted by an earthquake. The earthquake destroyed many buildings in the city, and damaged many others.

== Geography and climate ==
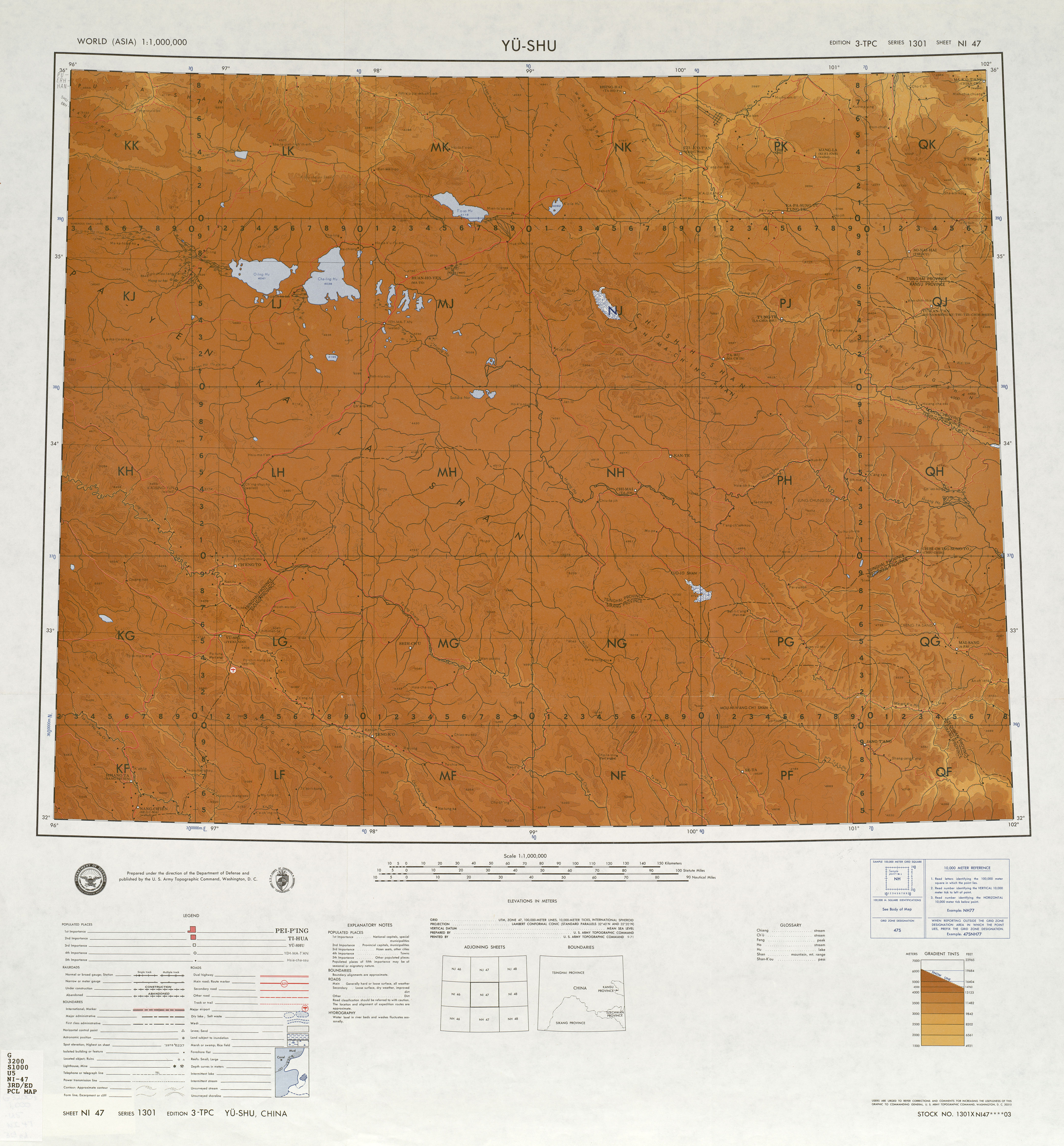
Map including Yushu (labeled as YÜ-SHU (JYEKUNDO)) (ATC, 1971)

With an elevation of around 3,700 metres (12,100 ft), Yushu has an alpine subarctic climate (Köppen Dwc, Trewartha Eolo), with long, cold, very dry winters, and short, rainy, and mild summers. Average low temperatures are below freezing from early/mid-October to late April; however, due to the wide diurnal temperature variation, the average high never lowers to the freezing mark. Despite frequent rain during summer, when a majority of days sees rain, only June, the rainiest month, has less than 50% of possible sunshine; with monthly percent possible sunshine ranging from 49% in June to 66% in November, the city receives 2,496 hours of bright sunshine annually. The monthly 24-hour average temperature ranges from −6.8 °C (19.8 °F) in January to 13.3 °C (55.9 °F) in July, while the annual mean is 3.75 °C (38.7 °F). About three-fourths of the annual precipitation of 482 mm (19.0 in) is delivered from June to September. The residents of Yushu City reported seeing a large meteor fireball falling from the sky into the horizon on December 23, 2020.

Climate data for Yushu, elevation 3,717 m (12,195 ft), (1991–2020 normals, extremes 1951–present)
Month	Jan	Feb	Mar	Apr	May	Jun	Jul	Aug	Sep	Oct	Nov	Dec	Year
Record high °C (°F)	17.6 (63.7)	15.6 (60.1)	23.9 (75.0)	26.1 (79.0)	34.1 (93.4)	35.7 (96.3)	36.8 (98.2)	34.4 (93.9)	33.7 (92.7)	25.2 (77.4)	18.5 (65.3)	15.0 (59.0)	36.8 (98.2)
Mean maximum °C (°F)	9.5 (49.1)	11.0 (51.8)	15.4 (59.7)	18.9 (66.0)	22.5 (72.5)	25.0 (77.0)	25.8 (78.4)	25.7 (78.3)	23.7 (74.7)	19.9 (67.8)	12.6 (54.7)	9.9 (49.8)	26.9 (80.4)
Mean daily maximum °C (°F)	2.5 (36.5)	5.2 (41.4)	8.8 (47.8)	12.6 (54.7)	16.0 (60.8)	18.8 (65.8)	20.9 (69.6)	20.8 (69.4)	18.0 (64.4)	12.4 (54.3)	7.8 (46.0)	4.0 (39.2)	12.3 (54.2)
Daily mean °C (°F)	−6.9 (19.6)	−3.6 (25.5)	0.4 (32.7)	4.4 (39.9)	8.3 (46.9)	11.5 (52.7)	13.5 (56.3)	12.9 (55.2)	9.8 (49.6)	4.0 (39.2)	−1.7 (28.9)	−6.0 (21.2)	3.9 (39.0)
Mean daily minimum °C (°F)	−14.5 (5.9)	−10.9 (12.4)	−6.4 (20.5)	−2.2 (28.0)	2.0 (35.6)	6.1 (43.0)	7.7 (45.9)	6.9 (44.4)	4.5 (40.1)	−1.5 (29.3)	−8.5 (16.7)	−13.6 (7.5)	−2.5 (27.4)
Mean minimum °C (°F)	−20.9 (−5.6)	−18.2 (−0.8)	−13.6 (7.5)	−7.9 (17.8)	−3.3 (26.1)	0.5 (32.9)	2.2 (36.0)	1.2 (34.2)	−1.8 (28.8)	−8.2 (17.2)	−14.7 (5.5)	−19.9 (−3.8)	−21.7 (−7.1)
Record low °C (°F)	−30.0 (−22.0)	−28.3 (−18.9)	−19.5 (−3.1)	−12.8 (9.0)	−11.6 (11.1)	−4.8 (23.4)	−1.9 (28.6)	−2.3 (27.9)	−7.9 (17.8)	−14.3 (6.3)	−21.7 (−7.1)	−27.6 (−17.7)	−30.0 (−22.0)
Average precipitation mm (inches)	4.3 (0.17)	4.8 (0.19)	10.3 (0.41)	19.1 (0.75)	57.3 (2.26)	103.2 (4.06)	93.1 (3.67)	85.6 (3.37)	77.7 (3.06)	32.9 (1.30)	3.4 (0.13)	2.3 (0.09)	494 (19.46)
Average precipitation days (≥ 0.1 mm)	3.9	4.4	6.4	11.5	17.8	22.3	19.7	18.6	19.6	12.9	3.5	2.2	142.8
Average snowy days	5.9	7.3	10.0	13.4	5.4	0.7	0.1	0.1	0.5	9.6	5.8	3.9	62.7
Average relative humidity (%)	42	40	41	48	55	64	65	65	68	63	48	41	53
Mean monthly sunshine hours	185.7	182.0	215.3	224.5	222.9	194.2	218.2	213.1	188.6	187.6	198.2	194.4	2,424.7
Percentage possible sunshine	58	58	58	57	52	45	50	52	52	54	64	63	55
Source: China Meteorological AdministrationAll-time Nov Record low

== Administrative divisions ==
Yushu comprises four subdistricts, two towns, and six townships.

Name	Simplified Chinese	Hanyu Pinyin	Tibetan	Administrative division code
Subdistricts
Gyêgu Subdistrict (Jiegu)	结古街道	Jiégǔ Jiēdào	སྐྱེ་རྒུ་སྲང་ལམ་	632701001
Zhaxike Subdistrict	扎西科街道	Zhāxīkē Jiēdào	བྱ་ཤུལ་ཁོག་སྲང་ལམ་	632701002
Xihang Subdistrict	西杭街道	Xīháng Jiēdào	ཤེལ་དཀར་སྲང་ལམ་	632701003
Xinzhai Subdistrict	新寨街道	Xīnzhài Jiēdào	སེང་ཟེ་སྲང་ལམ་	632701004
Towns
Longbao	隆宝镇	Lóngbǎo Zhèn	རོང་པོ་གྲོང་རྡལ།	632701101
Xialaxiu	下拉秀镇	Xiàlāxiù Zhèn	རག་སྨད་གྲོང་རྡལ།	632701102
Townships
Zhongda Township	仲达乡	Zhòngdá Xiāng	འབྲོང་མདའ་ཡུལ་ཚོ།	632701200
Batang Township	巴塘乡	Bātáng Xiāng	དཔལ་ཐང་ཡུལ་ཚོ།	632701201
Xiaosumang Township	小苏莽乡	Xiǎosūmǎng Xiāng	ཟུར་མང་ཡུལ་ཚོ།	632701202
Shanglaxiu Township	上拉秀乡	Shànglāxiù Xiāng	རག་སྟོད་ཡུལ་ཚོ།	632701203
Anchong Township	安冲乡	Ānchōng Xiāng	ཨ་ཁྲོ་ཡུལ་ཚོ	632701205
Haxiu Township	哈秀乡	Hāxiù Xiāng	ཧ་ཤུལ་ཡུལ་ཚོ།	632701400

== Demographics ==
During the late 20th century, government policy encouraged merchants throughout the region to settle down in Yushu. A 1995 research paper estimated that these merchants, which included many Hui people, comprised about one-third of Yushu's population.

== Transportation ==
The city is served by the China National Highway 214 and the recently constructed (opened 2009) Yushu Batang Airport.

== Culture ==
=== Religion ===
The city has a few monasteries in and around, it has also one mosque. Gyegu Monastery is located on the hill, while Thrangu Monastery and Domkar Monastery are located outside the city. There are also some famous religious sites such as the Wencheng Temple, the Gyanak Mani Stone Temple, and the King Gesar Museum. The Wencheng Temple is located 20 kilometers from the city center, while Gyanak Mani Temple is located 9 kilometers from the center. King Gesar Museum is located in the city center.

=== Festivals ===
The city hosts a number of notable cultural festivals. Yushu is home to an annual horse racing festival, where Kham Tibetan warriors showcase their local culture. The Yushu Horse Racing Festival is a traditional festival that is normally held at the end of July to the beginning of August, depending on the dates in the Tibetan calendar. The festival site is located on the lush summer grasslands of the valley floor, to make for better horse-racing events. Renowned as being the largest horse racing event in the Tibetan areas, the festival plays host to tens of thousands of Tibetans and tourists every year.

The festival features feats of horsemanship and horse racing that have been native to the plateau for over two thousand years, as well as horseback archery, tug-of-war, weightlifting, and many other local sports.

== See also ==
- 2010 Yushu earthquake
