= List of prisons in Gansu =

This is a list of prisons within Gansu province of the People's Republic of China.

Name	Enterprise name	City/County/District	Village/Town	Established	Notes
Baiyin Prison	Baiyin Farm	Jingyuan County, Gansu, Baiyin	Beiwan	2002	In Si'erping, largest prison in the Northwest
Dingxi Prison	Dingxi Crane Factory	Dingxi	Jiaojiapo	1951	Exports to Australia and Pakistan
Gan'gu Prison	Gan'gu Radiator Plant	Gangu County, Tianshui	Xinxing		
Hezuo Prison		Gannan Tibetan Autonomous Prefecture	Hezuo		
Jinchang Prison	Hongguang Horticultural Farm; Hongguang Horticultural Corp.	Jinchang	Tufosi	1953	Produces acid-proof antiseptic bricks and boards, chemical tower stuffing, low-voltage insulators, wear-resistant porcelain balls, porcelain sand among others. Also does agricultural production, raising livestock, seed harvesting, animal, husbandry, chemicals and ceramics, building materials, composite fodder, non-staple grain and oil food products, machining among others. Area of farm 14.17 km²
Jingyuan Prison		Jingyuan County, Gansu, Baiyin	Beiwan		In Guchengcun, merged with Baiyin Prison in 2002
Jiuquan Prison	Jiuquan Farm; Jiuquan Electric Machinery Plant	Jiuquan		1951	Fixed assets over 25 mil yuan, sells to Hongkong and Macao
Lanzhou Prison	Lanzhou Valve Plant (combination of former Lanzhou Valve Plant and Lanzhou Bus Factory); Lanzhou Valve LLC	Lanzhou			Large-scale prison, resulting from a 2000 merger, pre-merger Lanzhou Prison was founded in 1949. Fixed assets worth nearly 100 mil yuan. Produces, among other things, medium- and low-pressure valves of all types (exported to southeast Asian countries)
Pingliang Prison	Pingliang Machine Tool Accessories Factory (Pingliang Machine Tool Accessories LLC); Pingliang Sanitized Materials Plant	Pingliang		2003	Current Pingliang Prison is the result of Pingliang Prison established in 1951
Provincial Juvenile Offender Detachment	Liangzhou Carpet Plant	Wuwei, Gansu			moved to Wuwei in 1989
Provincial No. 4 Prison	Pingliang Sanitary Materials Plant	Pingliang	Xidajie	1949	
Provincial Women's Prison	Jiuzhou Clothing Factory	Lanzhou			
Tianshui Prison	Tianshui Machine Tool Plant (Tianshui Machine Tool LLC)	Tianshui		1949	Machine tool plant established in 1972
Tianzhu Prison	Tianzhu Construction Materials Plant	Tianzhu Tibetan Autonomous County	Shimen		in Mayingpo
Tongcheng Prison	Wudaping Farm	Jingyuan County, Gansu, Baiyin	Zhongbao	1969	in Zhongbaoping, merged with Baiyin Prison in 2002
Wudu Prison		Wudu District	Liangshui	1949	Originally called Provincial No. 11 Labor Reform Detachment, gross output value of all prison enterprises 3.4747 mil yuan in 2002.
Wuwei Prison		Wuwei, Gansu			Possibly moved to Huangtaicun, Jinyang Town, Liangzhou District, possibly merged with Tianzhu and Yongdeng Prisons
Yongdeng Prison	Yongdeng Limestone Mine	Yongdeng County	Tungouwan Wushengyi	1990	Area of 600,000 m², possibly merged with Tianzhu and Wuwei Prisons

== Sources ==
- "Laogai Handbook 2007-2008" (PDF) (in Chinese and English). Washington, D.C.: Laogai Research Foundation. October 2008. pp. 81–92. ISBN 978-1-931550-25-3.
