= Huang Guanjun =

Chinese marathon runner (1987–2021)

Personal information
- Born: 1987
- Died: 22 May 2021 (aged 33–34) Baiyin, Gansu, China

Sport
- Sport: Marathon runner

Huang Guanjun (Chinese: 黄关军; pinyin: Huáng Guānjūn; 1987 – 22 May 2021) was a Chinese marathon runner who died in the Gansu ultramarathon disaster.

Huang was the champion in the men's hearing-impaired marathon at China's 2019 National Paralympic Games. He died on 22 May 2021, at the age of 34, when high winds and freezing rain struck a long-distance race in Baiyin, Gansu, China. Twenty-one other runners died in the tragedy.

He had impaired hearing after an 'injection error' when he was one year old, and he was also unable to speak. Having difficulty finding employment, he had, according to his friends, 'joined races over the years in the hopes of winning some prize money'.

== See also ==
- Liang Jing, another champion runner who died in the Gansu ultramarathon
