= Gansu ultramarathon disaster =

Fatal 2021 marathon event in China

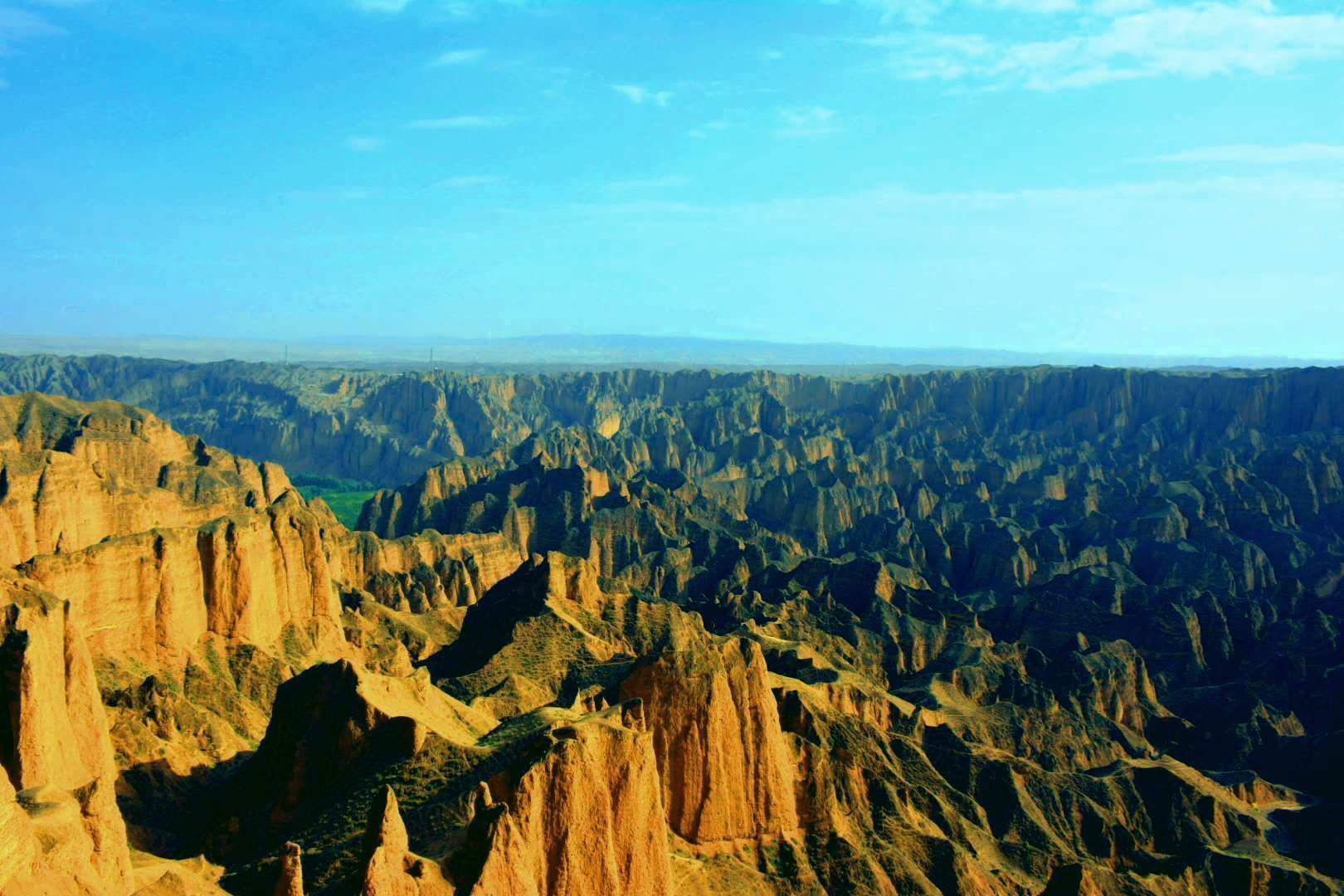
- The Yellow River Stone Forest
- Native name: 黄河石林百公里越野赛事故 (Yellow River Stone Forest 100k trail running race accident)
- Date: 22 May 2021
- Time: 10:30–13:00 (China Standard Time (Note: While Gansu adopted the nationwide Beijing Time (UTC+8) from 1949, its actual geographical time as reflected by the abandoned Gansu-Sichuan time zone (隴蜀時間) would have been one hour earlier (UTC+7). The UTC+8 time gives the rescuers and runners "one extra hour of daylight" in Gansu as the sun set in Beijing, the capital with the same latitude.))
- Location: Mijiashan Hill, Yellow River Stone Forest, Jingtai County, China; 36°59′42″N 104°17′19″E
- Cause: Hypothermia; slow rescue
- Participants: 172
- Deaths: 21
- Injuries: 8

On 22 May 2021, twenty-one professional runners died from hypothermia while competing in a government-run 100-kilometre (62 mi) trail running ultramarathon race held in the Yellow River Stone Forest in Jingtai County, Gansu, China.

The race had 172 participants. When a cold front struck, gusts reaching level 9 (75–88 km/h [47–55 mph]) brought rain and possibly graupel and the apparent temperature dropped from 1 °C (34 °F) at 10:00 to −5 °C (23 °F) from 11:20 to 13:50. Many runners collapsed unconscious from hypothermia while reaching the 2,230-metre (7,320 ft) checkpoint. The organizers were unaware of the scope of the disaster because they did not assign any staff between checkpoints and they did not know the area of concern was in a mobile phone signal blind spot. The collapsed runners did not survive and rescuers did not arrive until 19:00. The dead were from the lead pack due to the timing of the cold front, while the slower runners survived. The number of fatalities and the fatality rate surpassed the U.S.–China joint Yangtze rafting disaster in 1986 in Sichuan.

== Background ==
=== Local government as the organizer ===
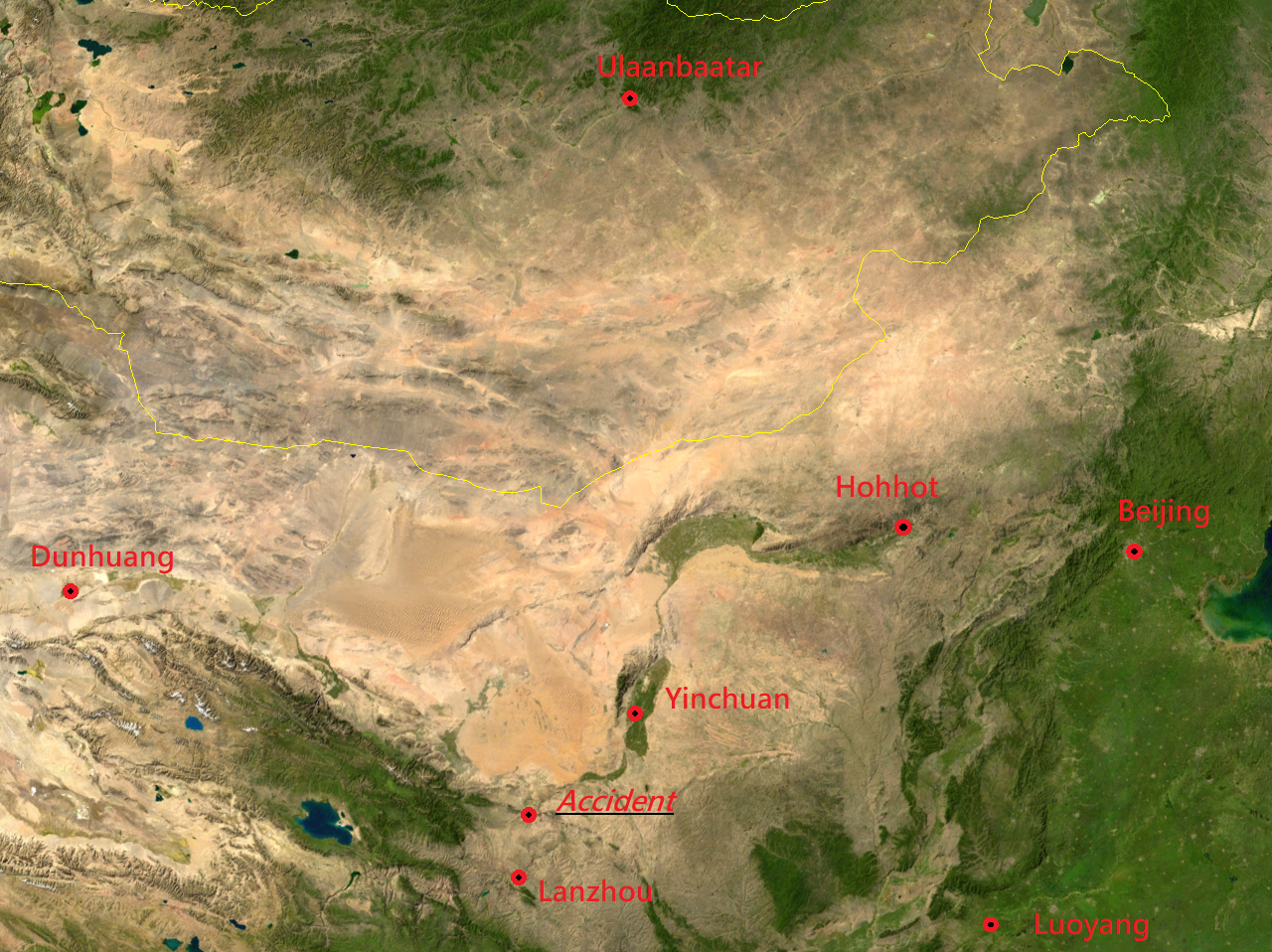
Location of Jingtai (marked as "accident") in northern China

The race was jointly organized by the sports department of Baiyin prefecture-level city and the Communist Party Committee of Jingtai County annually from 2018. The actual on-field event coordinator was the "Yellow River Stone Forest Administration", which is headed by the publicity chief of Jingtai County's Communist Party Committee, who later committed suicide (see § Disciplinary action). The actual operator of the race was a local sports marketing company, Shengjing Sports Culture Development Ltd.

The Baiyin and Jingtai officials were later condemned by the official investigation for "being organizers only on paper" and not performing their duty to supervise as organizers. The on-field coordinators and some of the sports marketing company staff were later arrested.

=== Race rules ===
The 2021 edition consisted of three events: a 5 kilometres (3.1 mi) run, a half marathon and a 100 km (62 mi) trail running event. Participants in the 100 km race had to show proof of completing a similar race of over 50 km within the last year. The race manual made windbreakers recommended but not compulsory.

== Accident and weather ==
=== Terrain and contingency planning ===
The 100-kilometre (62 mi) trail was set along Mijiashan Hill of the Yellow River Stone Forest, a treeless karst terrain at the transition from the Loess Plateau at its south to the Tengger Desert at the north. The terrain is mostly alluvial sandstone. The starting line, at the main entrance of scenic area, has an elevation of 1,595 metres (5,233 ft); while the summit at the third checkpoint reaches 2,230 metres (7,320 ft).

The most rugged and narrow section, between the second and third checkpoints, was not accessible by road and required a 1–2 hour hike from the nearest roads in the best weather conditions. The event coordinator did not assign any staff or aid stations to the second and third checkpoints, and the two checkpoints were largely mobile phone signal blind spots, which the coordinator did not know. This greatly hampered the efforts of the searchers and distressed trail runners who tried to report what had happened.

=== Runners' preparation of clothing ===
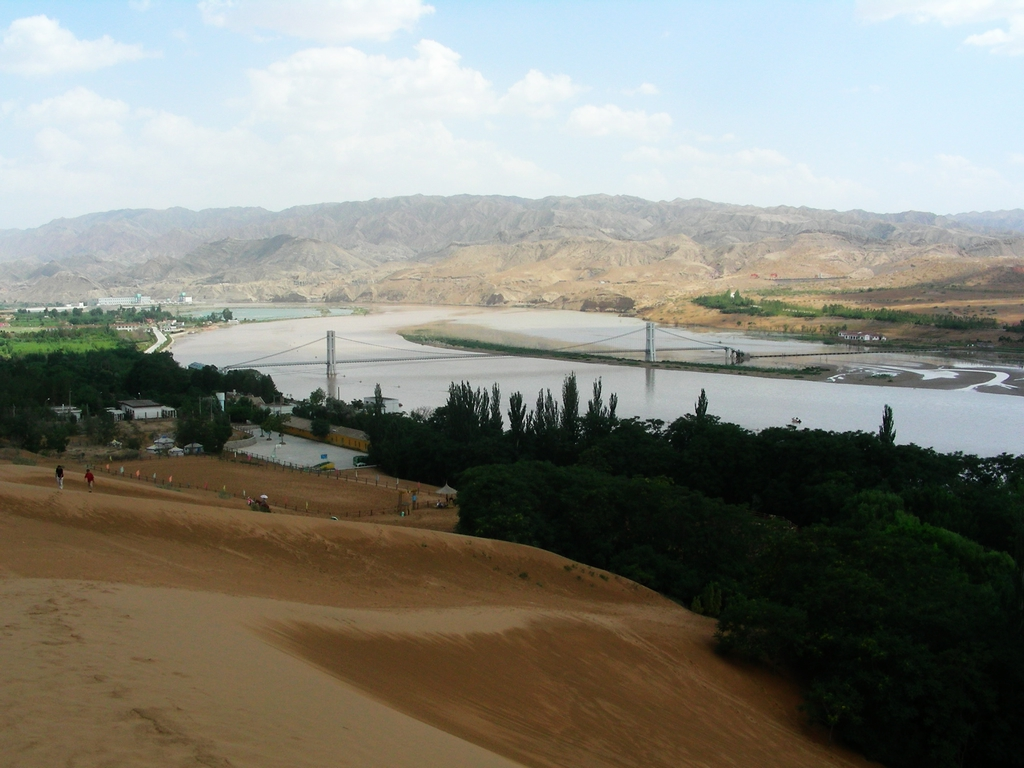
The southern edge of the Tengger Desert meets the Yellow River (both pictured) at Shapotou, 80 kilometres (50 mi) north of the Stone Forest. Weather forecast warned of yellow dust and winds.

The night before the race, when the weather was pleasant, the organizer offered to collect runners' night supplies and to place them at the sixth checkpoint (62 km [39 mi]), to be picked up by the runners mid-race the next evening. In the three previous years the race was sunny and hot, so most runners handed away their windbreakers. The next day, they showed up wearing vests and shorts. While warming up at the starting line, they were concerned by the cloudy, windy weather.

However, the weather forecast the night before should have warned the organizers that it would not be a hot day as the previous three years had been. At 21:50 the night before, the city's meteorological center issued the lowest grade of a four-graded wind warning and stated, "in the upcoming 24 hours, in Baiyin, Jingtai, [...], the average windspeed will reach levels 5–6 and gust will reach levels 7 or above, accompanied by yellow dust and sand." The provincial meteorological center, at an unknown time on the day before, flagged a key notice that warned of "21–22 May is forecasted to have massive yellow dust and sand carried by winds, a drop of temperature and some precipitation. Atmospheric convection is getting strong in May in general, so beware of sudden heavy showers, hail, lightning and gusts."

=== Mid-race cold front ===
Course map

At 09:00 (Nationwide Beijing time) on Saturday 22 May 2021, the 100-kilometre (62 mi) trail running race began. From 10:30, the north-facing third checkpoint, with an elevation of 2,230 metres (7,320 ft), was hit by a cold front originated from Mongolia via the Tengger Desert off Jingtai.

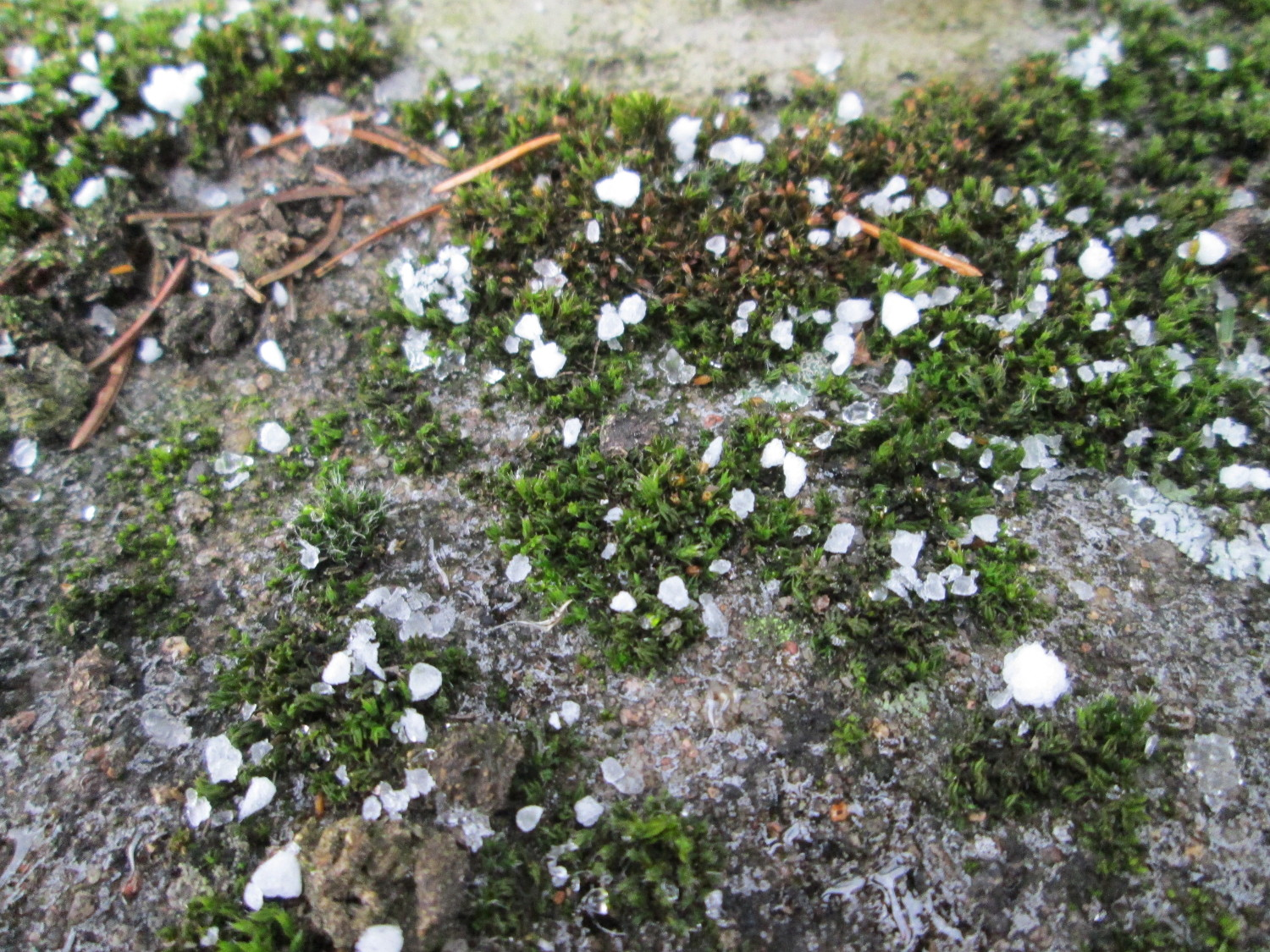
An example of graupel (not pictured on-site)

From 08:00, temperature dropped 5–7 °C (9–12.6 °F) within 5 hours, yet the gales accompanied with graupel and rain was a bigger issue. The average windspeed reached levels 6–7 and gust reached levels 8–9. These winds carried 3–5 mm of accumulated precipitation. The apparent temperature felt by the runners at 09:20 at the first and second checkpoints were both 7 °C (45 °F); then both fell to 3 °C (37 °F) at 10:50. At the third checkpoint, with an elevation of 2,230 meters (7,320 ft), the apparent temperature dropped from 1 °C (34 °F) at 10:00 to −5 °C (23 °F) from 11:20 to 13:50, while actual temperature at 13:00 was 4 °C (39 °F). While many runners reported sightings of hail and freezing rain, the investigation concluded it was most probably graupel because the weather conditions were impossible for the former two to exist.

Runners taking refuge behind rocks found their space blankets torn to pieces by winds. Some among the lead pack got lost near the summit at the third checkpoint because of fog and due to trail marks having been blown away.

== Errors in search and rescue ==
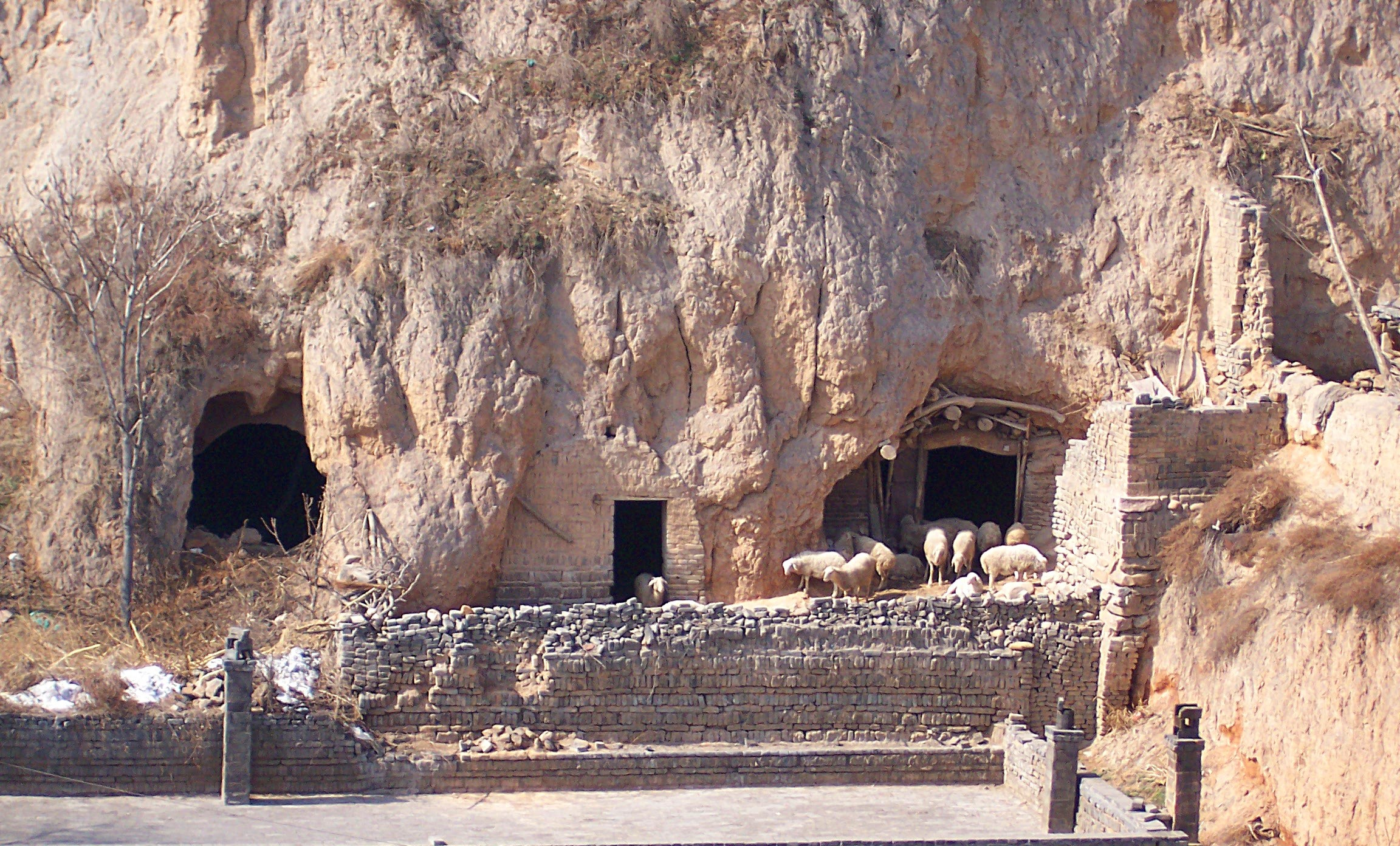
A typical yaodong on Loess Plateau similar to the one used by shepherd Zhu Keming in his rescuing of runners

=== First hour of rescue efforts ===
The operator of the race, which was a local sports marketing company, had equipped runners with Global Positioning System (GPS) devices. The first distress message was sent at 11:50 (Nationwide Beijing time) by a runner via GPS, but never received a response. The first distress message received was sent via the official WeChat message group at 12:17, while a photo of ten runners huddling together was sent at 12:30. An ill-equipped private search team called Blue Sky Rescue, stationed at the starting line, sent some of its 39 members to the hill between the second and third checkpoints. By around 14:00, they guided 18 runners capable of walking on their own to a lodge at the foothill. After the accident, questions were raised about their qualifications.

The most timely rescue to those in critical medical condition came from a local shepherd, Zhu Keming. Around 13:00–14:00, while his sheep insisted on grazing in cold, windy, rainy weather at the Mijiashan Hill, he spotted the stricken runners, some already unconscious and severely hypothermic. He saved six by bringing them to his heated yaodong cave. He later spotted three more runners dead not far from his cave.

=== Instruction given to the villagers ===
At 14:30, the Yellow River Stone Forest Administration phoned the mayor of Zhongquan town with a brief instruction, "we need to bring winter supplies to the athletes". This ambiguous instruction was delegated to the closest village at the foothill, Changsheng. Changsheng villagers did not learn of the urgency until 16:42 when shepherd Zhu Keming, who was taking refuge uphill, managed to get out of the mobile phone signal blind spot and phone to report that two runners had died. Villager Zhu Wanwen, who had a motorbike, departed around 16:00 and he saved a runner who was foaming at the mouth at around 18:00–19:00. Sixty other men from Changsheng, mostly around the age of 50, hiked up to the distressed third checkpoint by 20:00.

=== Arrival of firefighters 9 hours later ===
At 15:34, a local phoned the Baiyin Prefecture Emergency Center. Jingtai County firefighters, located 33 kilometres (21 mi) away, were dispatched at 16:21, arrived at the car-accessible fourth checkpoint around 17:45 and hiked up to the distressed third checkpoint around 21:00. By this point, their job was largely a body-recovering mission. Although firefighters brought thermal-imaging drones and radar, they got lost in the dark a few times and relied on villagers' guidance. The villagers, who brought warm clothes and bedding with them, were more useful to the runners suffering hypothermia. The firefighters were not geared or trained to identify hypothermia, and did not attempt to perform cardiopulmonary resuscitation (CPR) on the runners who "looked dead".

== Timeline of fatalities ==
A total of 21 runners (18 men and 3 women) died, and a further 8 were injured. All of the dead were in the lead pack. When the cold front arrived, the lead pack were near the summit at the third checkpoint and faced the wind in wide open; while the much slower runners, mostly female, missed the cold front. Only four of the 172 runners made it to the fourth checkpoint. These four runners were way behind the lead pack, for instance, the first among the four arrived the second checkpoint at 11:09, while Liang Jing, the first of the six runners in the lead pack, arrived at 10:42.

Liang, a former champion and a record-holder, was among the casualties and recorded a zero heart rate at 13:08 by his sports watch. Also one of the victims was Huang Guanjun, a hearing-impaired marathon champion from China's 2019 National Paralympic Games.

== Aftermath ==
=== Disciplinary action ===
Jingtai County's Communist Party Secretary, Li Zuobi, the highest ranked in the county yet only middle ranked among the organizers, died by suicide on 9 June 2021.

The official investigation handed internal Communist Party disciplinary actions to 31 others, mostly in the form of demerit.

=== Public reaction ===
The deaths generated public anger, with most of the blame directed at the organizer, the local government. Questions were raised about the lack of contingency planning. The number of casualties and the death of some elite trail runners made international news headlines.

=== Impact on sporting events in China ===
On 2 June 2021, the Sports Administration of China suspended all high-risk sporting events that lack oversight bodies. This included mountain and desert trail running, wingsuit flying, and ultra-long-distance races.

=== Justice ===
Several individuals were sentenced to prison for their roles in the disaster. A court in Baiyin handed down prison terms ranging from three to five and a half years to five event organisers, who were convicted of "organising a large-scale event that led to a significant safety incident." Additionally, in the provincial capital Lanzhou, one government official received four years and ten months for dereliction of duty and bribery, while another was sentenced to three and a half years solely for dereliction of duty.

== Other running races hit by cold weather ==
- The Hong Kong Ultra-Trail World Tour in January 2016 had its 100 km finishing line at a summit hit by a −6 °C (21 °F) cold wave. Exhausted after a 100 km race, runners were trapped for hours as all roads and even some of their clothes were covered in black ice.
