= Renmin Road Subdistrict, Baiyin =

Renmin Road Subdistrict 人民路街道
- Subdistrict
- Location in Gansu
- Coordinates: 36°32′48″N 104°10′13″E
- Country: China
- Province: Gansu
- Prefecture-level city: Baiyin
- District: Baiyin District
- Time zone: UTC+8 (China Standard Time)

Renmin Road Subdistrict (Chinese: 人民路街道; pinyin: Rénmínlù Jiēdào) is a subdistrict situated in Baiyin District, Baiyin, Gansu, China. As of 2020, it administers the following six residential neighborhoods:

- Renmin Road Community
- Zhongxin Street Community (中心街社区)
- Wuxing Street Community (五星街社区)
- Wuyi Street Community (五一街社区)
- Xicun Community (西村社区)
- Shuichuan Road Community (水川路社区)

== See also ==
- List of township-level divisions of Gansu
