= Yongtai =

Yongtai may refer to:

== Places in China ==
- Yongtai County, a county in Fujian
- Yongtai, Jiangxi (永泰), a town in Zhangshu, Jiangxi
- Yongtai, Zhongjiang County (永太), a town in Zhongjiang County, Sichuan
- Yongtai Township, Sichuan (永泰乡), a township in Yanting County, Sichuan
- Yongtai Township, Shaanxi (永太乡), a township in Yongshou County, Shaanxi
- Yongtai Station, a metro station in Guangzhou, Guangdong
- Yongtai Fortress (永泰古城), a historical fortress and village in Jingtai Country, Gansu

== Historical eras ==
- Yongtai (永泰, 498), era name used by Emperor Ming of Southern Qi
- Yongtai (永泰, 765–766), era name used by Emperor Daizong of Tang
