= Tai'an Village =

Tai'an 泰安村
- Village
- Location in Gansu Tai'an (China)
- Coordinates: 36°27′48″N 104°26′23″E
- Country: People's Republic of China
- Province: Gansu
- Prefecture-level city: Baiyin
- County: Jingyuan
- Town: Beiwan

Area
  - Total: 5.1 km^{2} (2.0 sq mi)

Population
  - Total: 3,832
  - Density: 750/km^{2} (1,900/sq mi)

Tai'an Village (Chinese: 泰安村) is the smallest village under the jurisdiction of Beiwan Town (北湾镇), Jingyuan County, Gansu. It has a total area of 5.1 square kilometres (2.0 sq mi), with 3.8 kilometres (2.4 mi) of roads. As of 2012, the village had 3,832 people in 987 households. Among them 82 are Communist Party members, 17 (20.73%) of those being women. Out of the 3,534 mǔ of land in the village, 157 were devoted to orchards and 955 to vegetable greenhouses; livestock in the village included 5,100 pigs, 1,760 sheep, and 196,400 chickens. Total annual grain production was 2,565 tonnes, while vegetable production was 5,727 tonnes. The per capita net income of farmers had reached 5,200 yuan by that year.
