= Wuhe, Baiyin =

Wuhe 五合镇
- Town
- Location in Gansu
- Coordinates: 36°58′8″N 105°6′39″E
- Country: People's Republic of China
- Province: Gansu
- Prefecture-level city: Baiyin
- County: Jingyuan County
- Time zone: UTC+8 (China Standard)

Wuhe (Chinese: 五合; pinyin: Wǔhé) is a town under the administration of Jingyuan County, Gansu, China. As of 2020, it has 14 villages under its administration:

- Yangsi Village (杨寺村)
- Liuzhaike Village (刘寨柯村)
- Tianwo Village (田窝村)
- Yemalao Village (野马涝村)
- Jiazhaike Village (贾寨柯村)
- Baicilin Village (白茨林村)
- Erdaoqu Village (二道渠村)
- Baita Village (白塔村)
- Zhuzhaike Village (朱寨柯村)
- Banwei Village (板尾村)
- Baiyahe Village (白崖河村)
- Shangshutang Village (尚书淌村)
- Xujuan Village (许眷村)
- Dawan Village (大湾村)
