= China National Highway 338 =

Road in China

National Highway 338
- 338国道

Major junctions
- From: Haixing
- To: Tianjun

Location
- Country: China

Highway system
- National Trunk Highway System; Primary; Auxiliary
← G337	→ G339

China National Highway 338 will run from Haixing to Tianjun. It is one of the new trunk highways proposed in the China National Highway Network Planning (2013 - 2030).

== Status ==
Hubei

Shanxi

Shaanxi

Complete between Dianta and Fugu County.

Inner Mongolia

Partially complete in Otog Banner. Under construction in Uxin Banner.

Ningxia

Planning phase between Zhongning and Zhongwei.

Gansu

Completed between Jingtai County and border with Qinghai.

Qinghai

Planning phase in Menyuan County.
