= Jingtai =

Jingtai may refer to:

- Jingtai County (景泰县), Gansu, China
- Jingtai Emperor (景泰, 1428 – 1457), Chinese emperor of the Ming dynasty
- Jingtai Expressway (京台高速公路), projected expressway which will, when completed, connect Beijing with Taipei
- Jingtai, Yitong County (景台镇), town in Yitong Manchu Autonomous County, Jilin, China
