= Qiangwan =

Qiangwan 强湾乡
- Township
- Location within Gansu Location within China
- Coordinates: 36.42931°N 104.21519°E
- Country: China
- Province: Gansu
- Prefecture-level city: Baiyin
- District: Baiyin

Area
  - Total: 255.03 km^{2} (98.47 sq mi)
- Elevation: 1,810 m (5,940 ft)

Population
  - Total: 8,210

Qiangwan is a township of Baiyin District, Baiyin City, Gansu, China. In 2017 it had a population of 8210. It governs over 1 residential community and 7 administrative villages. The township is located in a hilly area between the basin of Baiyin city and the Yellow River valley. The township mainly relies on growing wheat and corn.

A Qijia culture site has been found in Qiangwan.
