= Liang Jing (runner) =

Chinese marathon runner (1990–2021)

Personal information
- Born: March 1990
- Died: 22 May 2021 (aged 31) Baiyin, Gansu, China

Sport
- Sport: Ultramarathon runner

Liang Jing (Chinese: 梁晶; pinyin: Liáng Jīng; March 1990 – 22 May 2021) was a Chinese ultramarathon runner who died in the Gansu ultramarathon disaster.

Liang won several ultramarathons, including the Ultra Gobi—a 400 km (250 mi) race through the Gobi Desert—in 2018. He died on 22 May 2021, at the age of 31, when high winds and freezing rain struck a long-distance race in Baiyin, Gansu, China. Twenty-one other runners died in the tragedy.

He was nicknamed 'Liang God' and 'General Liang', and was considered 'one of China's most accomplished ultramarathoners'.

== See also ==
- Huang Guanjun, another champion runner who died in the Gansu ultramarathon
