= Pingchuan, Baiyin =

District in Baiyin, China

Pingchuan 平川区
- District
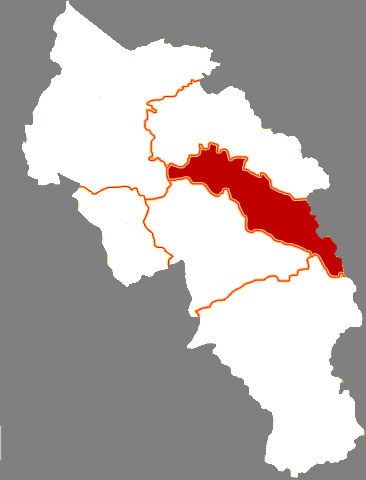
- Pingchuan in Baiyin

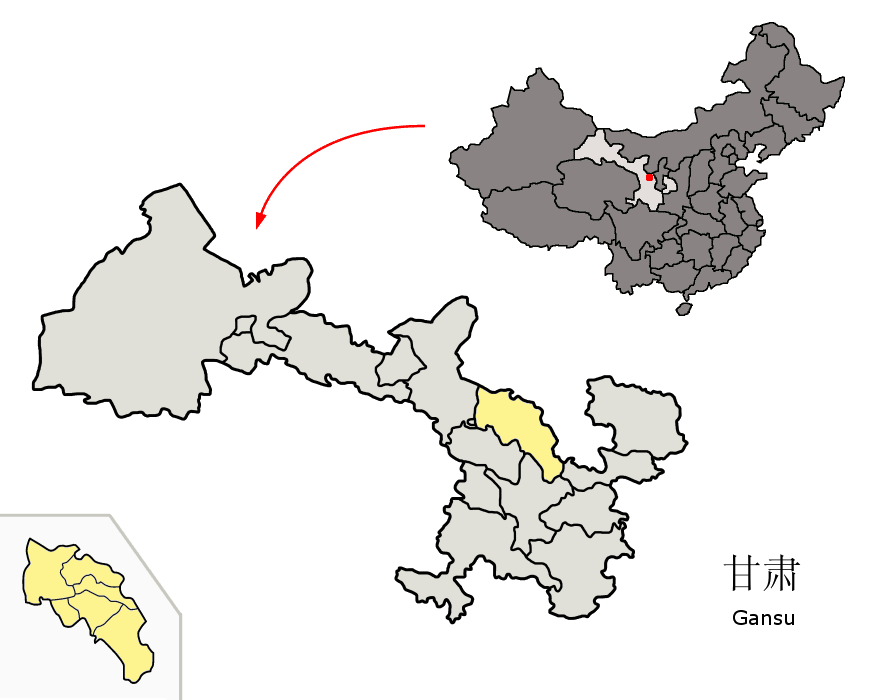
- Baiyin in Gansu
- Coordinates: 36°43′39″N 104°49′30″E
- Country: China
- Province: Gansu
- Prefecture-level city: Baiyin
- District seat: Xingpinglu

Area
  - Total: 2,106 km^{2} (813 sq mi)

Population (2016)
  - Total: 209,000
  - Density: 99.2/km^{2} (257/sq mi)
- Time zone: UTC+8 (China Standard)
- Postal code: 730913-730914
- Website: www.bypc.gov.cn

Pingchuan District (Chinese: 平川区; pinyin: Píngchuān Qū) is a district of the city of Baiyin, Gansu province, China. It is located about 65 km northeast of Baiyin city centre. The district was established in 1985, being part of Jingyuan County before then.

== Economy ==
It is a major centre for coal production in Gansu, producing over 12 million tonnes of coal annually. Pingchuan is also rich in clay deposits, and has a large ceramics industry, outputting US$81 million a year.

Until 2019, Pingchuan was designated a 'poverty-stricken county' by the Gansu provincial government.

== Rock Paintings ==
In March 2025, two ancient rock paintings estimated to be around 3,000 to 4,000 years old were discovered in Pingchuan District, on a hillside along the east bank of the Yellow River, about 2 km southeast of Yuwanquan Village. One painting, measuring 2.4 meters tall and 3.9 meters wide, features six figures including bighorn sheep, deer, and a hunting hound. Another painting nearby, sized 2.2 meters by 2.3 meters, includes five images, among them a rare depiction of a man using a whip to drive a pot-bellied sheep—the first known representation of such an animal in the region's rock art. Researchers highlighted the significance of these findings in understanding early human activities in the Yellow River basin.

== Administrative divisions ==
Pingchuan is subdivided in the following 4 subdistricts, 5 towns and 2 townships:

4 Subdistricts

- Changzheng Subdistrict (长征街道)
- Dianlilu Subdistrict (电力路街道)
- Honghuilu Subdistrict (红会路街道)
- Xingpinglu Subdistrict (兴平路街道)

5 Towns

- Wangjiashan Town (王家山镇)
- Shuiquan Town (水泉镇)
- Gonghe Town (共和镇)
- Baoji Town (宝积镇)
- Huangqiao Town (黄峤镇)

2 Townships

- Zhongtian Township (种田乡)
- Fuxing Township (复兴乡)

== Transport ==
- G6 Beijing–Lhasa Expressway
- China National Highway 109
- Honghui railway

== See also ==
- List of administrative divisions of Gansu
