= Baiyin, Baiyin =

Baiyin 白银区
- District
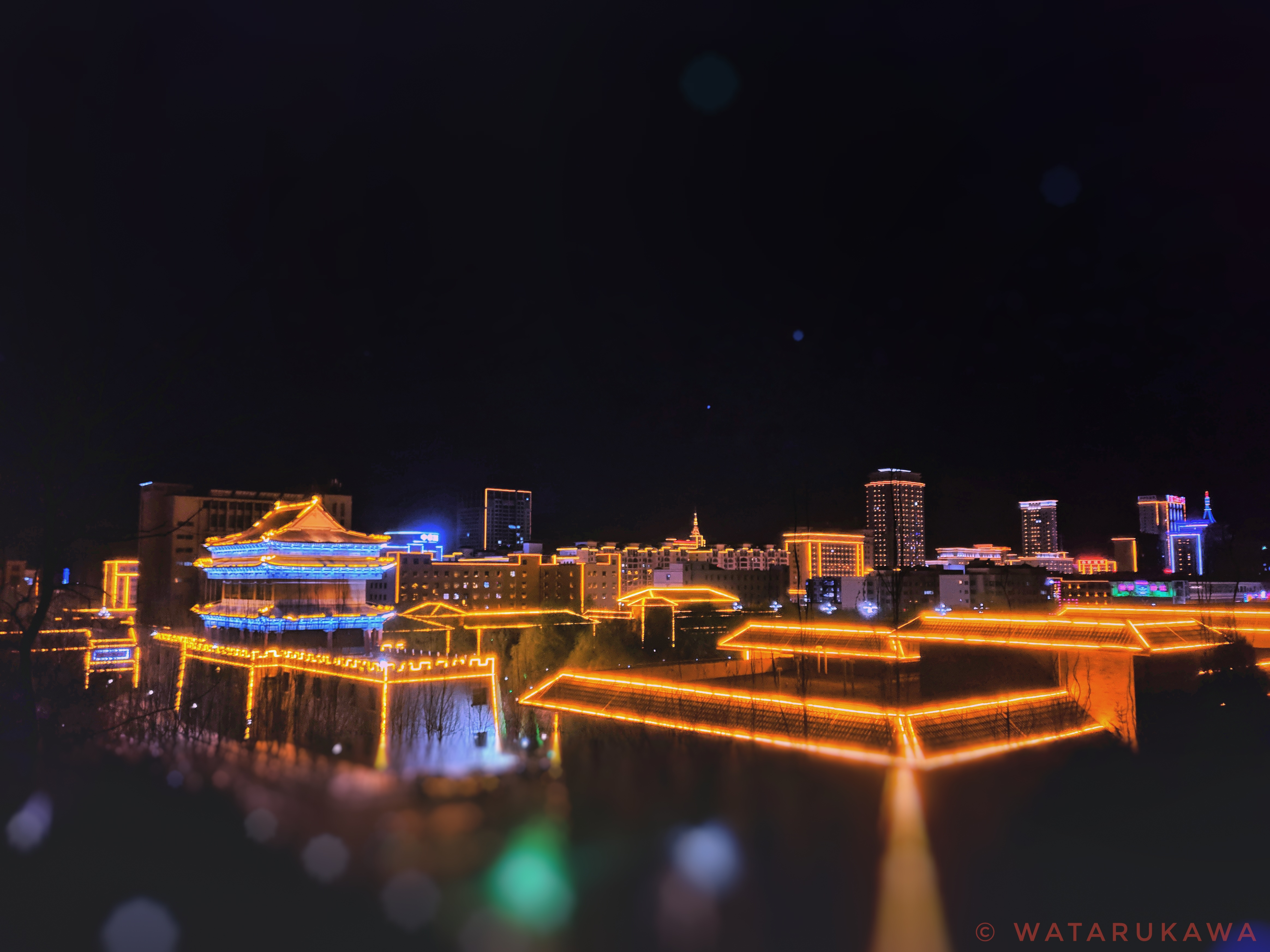

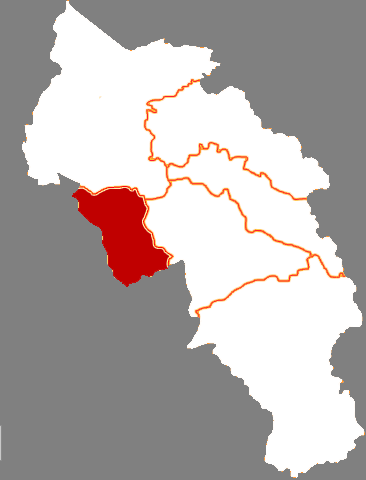
- Baiyin in Baiyin

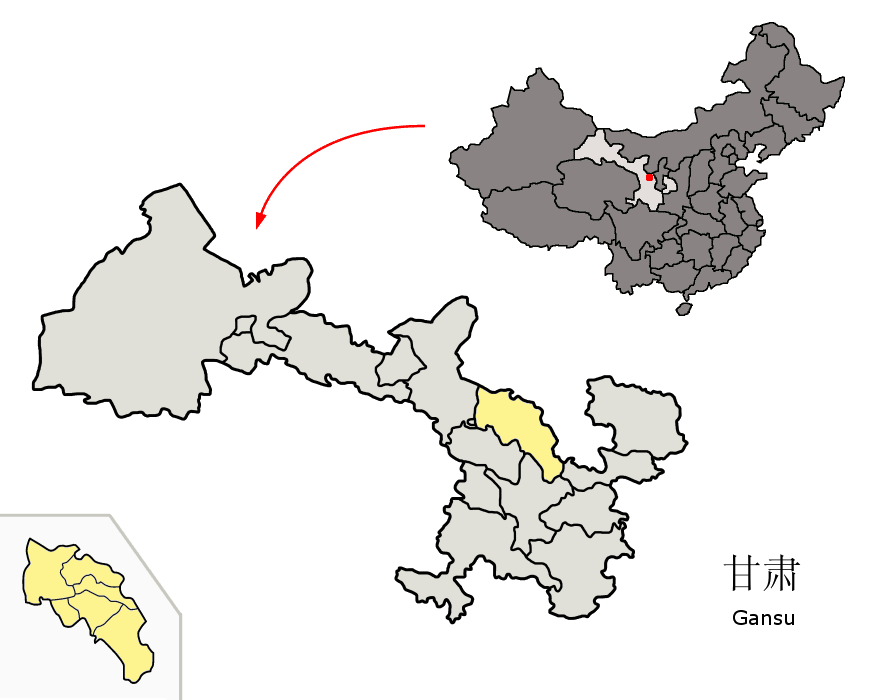
- Baiyin in Gansu

- Location in Gansu
- Coordinates (Baiyin District government): 36°32′07″N 104°08′55″E
- Country: China
- Province: Gansu
- Prefecture-level city: Baiyin
- District seat: Renminlu Subdistrict

Area
  - Total: 1,372 km^{2} (530 sq mi)
- Highest elevation: 2,273 m (7,457 ft)
- Lowest elevation (Yellow River): 1,420 m (4,660 ft)

Population (2020 census)
  - Total: 337,645
  - Density: 246.1/km^{2} (637.4/sq mi)
- Time zone: UTC+8 (China Standard)
- Postal code: 730900
- Website: www.baiyinqu.gov.cn

Baiyin District (simplified Chinese: 白银区; traditional Chinese: 白銀區; pinyin: Báiyín Qū) is the main urban district of and the economic, cultural and political center of the prefecture-level city of Baiyin, Gansu, China. It has a population of 290,000, 90% of whom live in the urban area. It was established as an administrative division in 1961.

== Geography ==
The urban area is located in a mountain basin at an elevation of around 1,700 m. The south of Baiyin district is traversed by the Yellow River, the only non-intermittent river in the district, and the main source of water for drinking and irrigation. The plains along the river are at circa 1,500 m. In 1998, floods caused economic damage and 3 people went missing in the towns near the river. Since then, hydropower dams have been built on the Yellow River.

The climate is temperate continental and semi-arid. The average temperature is 8.5 °C. The average annual precipitation is 204.3 mm, concentrated in the summer months. Due to the dry climate, the natural vegetation is mainly limited to arid grasslands. Baiyin is frequently hit by sandstorms.

Baiyin District had large non-ferrous metal resources, which have been exploited through open-pit mines. By 2008, most mines had become exhausted.

== Economy ==
Baiyin District ranks in the middle regions of GDP per capita in Gansu province. Formerly a mining town, the economy has come to rely on production of building materials, chemicals and agriculture.

== Administrative divisions ==
Baiyin District is divided to 5 subdistricts, 3 towns and 2 townships.

Subdistricts

- Renminlu Subdistrict (人民路街道)
- Gongyuanlu Subdistrict (公园路街道)
- Silonglu Subdistrict (四龙路街道)
- Gongnonglu Subdistrict (工农路街道)
- Fangzhilu Subdistrict (纺织路街道)

Towns

- Shuichuan (水川镇)
- Silong (四龙镇)
- Wangxian (王岘镇)

Townships

- Qiangwan Township (强湾乡)
- Wuchuan Township (武川乡)

== See also ==
- List of administrative divisions of Gansu
