= Yongtai Fortress =

- 永泰古城 (Chinese)
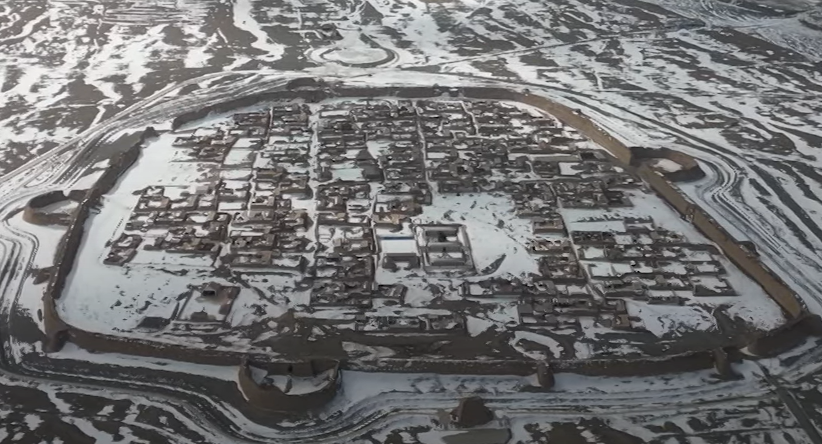
- Interactive map of Yongtai Fortress
- 37.13564°N 103.84662°E
- Type: Fortress
- Location: Jingtai County, Baiyin City, Gansu

History
- Built: 1608

Yongtai Fortress is a village and historical fortress town in Sitan Township, Jingtai County, Baiyin City, Gansu, China. Built in 1608 by the Ming dynasty rulers to defend against attacks from northern minorities, it stationed 2000 infantrymen and 500 cavalry units. The entire fort is enclosed by a rammed earth wall including defensive towers. Due to desertification, the village is now mostly abandoned, dropping from 1500 people in the 1950s, to around 100 today.
