= Chen Jialin =

Chinese film director (1942–2022)

Chen Jialin (Chinese: 陈家林; 1942 – 7 July 2022) was a Chinese film director.

== Filmography ==
- Tang Ming Huang (1990)
- Wu Zetian (1995)
- The Taiping Heavenly Kingdom (2000)
- Kangxi Dynasty (2001) — co-director
- The Affaire in the Swing Age (2003) — co-directed with He Xianda
- The Great Dunhuang (2006)
- Da Qing Fengyun (2006)
- Chu Han Zhengxiong (2012)
