= Honghui railway =

Railway line in China

The Honghui railway (Chinese: 红会铁路; pinyin: Hónghuì tiělù) is a railway line in Baiyin, Gansu, China. It was built in the early 1970s to allow the export of coal, and was opened in 1974. The line has also been used for the export of crops. The line branches from the Baotou–Lanzhou railway north of Baiyin West railway station. It continues east towards its terminus at Honghui railway station in Pingchuan District. Passenger services operate between Baiyin West and Changzheng railway station.

The Baiyin–Zhongwei section of the Yinchuan–Lanzhou high-speed railway runs roughly parallel to the line.

== Incident ==
On 8 March 2022 at around 10pm, a dump truck struck a railway overbridge between Wujiachuan and Jingyuan West stations. This caused the bridge to tilt. When a freight train passed over the bridge, the locomotive derailed and fell to the ground. Three people died at the scene and one injured person was taken to hospital.
