= Jingtai County =

Jingtai County 景泰县
- County
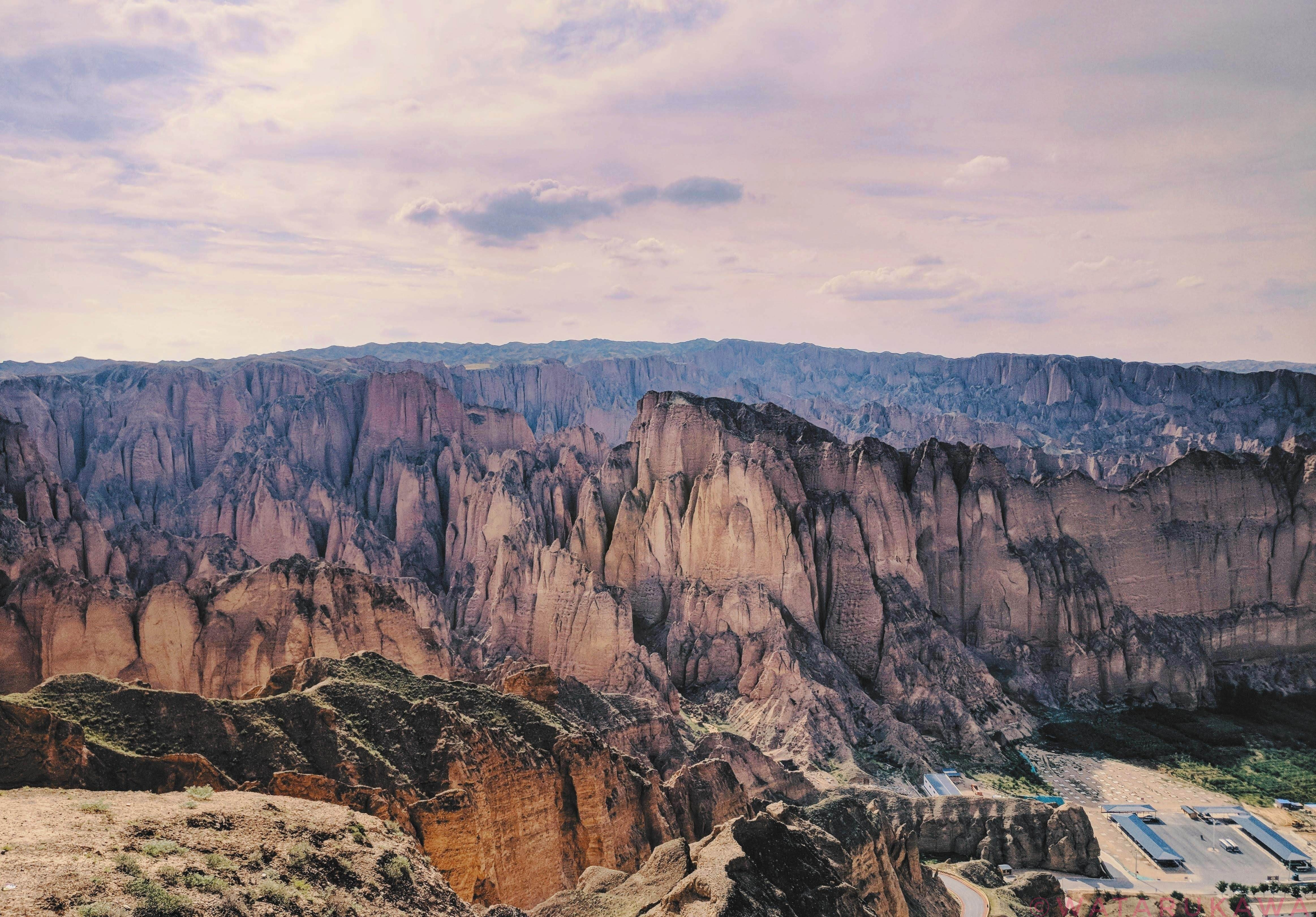
- Yellow River Stone Forest National Geopark

- Location of the seat in Gansu
- Coordinates: 37°11′02″N 104°03′50″E
- Country: China
- Province: Gansu
- Prefecture-level city: Baiyin
- County seat: Yitiaoshan

Area
  - Total: 5,483 km^{2} (2,117 sq mi)
- Highest elevation: 3,321 m (10,896 ft)
- Lowest elevation: 1,276 m (4,186 ft)

Population (2019)
  - Total: 238,900
  - Density: 43.57/km^{2} (112.8/sq mi)
- Time zone: UTC+8 (China Standard)
- Postal code: 730400
- Website: www.jingtai.gov.cn

Jingtai County (Chinese: 景泰县; pinyin: Jǐngtài Xiàn) is a county in the middle of Gansu Province, bordering Inner Mongolia to the north. It is under the administration of Baiyin City and located at its northwest end. Covering an area of 5,483 square kilometres (2,117 mi^{2}), it governs 8 towns and 3 townships, which then in turn govern 15 residential communities and 135 administrative villages. Its postal code is 730400, and its population as of the 2010 Chinese Census was 225,755 people, which the county government reports has grown to about 238,900 as of 2019.

It is located at the junction of Gansu, Ningxia, and Inner Mongolia. Historically, it was a military hub, a vital communication center on the Silk Road, an important ferry, and also a major transit route to Hexi, Xinjiang, Ningxia, and Inner Mongolia. Since 1933, the name of the county has been Jingtai (Chinese: 景泰; pinyin: Jǐngtài), which means "prosperity of the scene, peace of the country and the people".

The county is largely hilly and mountainous, with an elevation ranging from 1,276 metres (4,186 ft) to 3,321 metres (10,896 ft) above sea level. The county is home to a number of prominent tourist sites, such as the Yellow River Stone Forest, Yongtai Fortress, and other locations.

== History ==
During the late Qin and early Han dynasty, the early belonged to the Xiongnu after they exiled the Yuezhi people. Later in the Han dynasty, Emperor Xuan established Aowei County in present-day Jingtai County, which later evolved into the ancient city of Diaogou (simplified Chinese: 吊沟; traditional Chinese: 吊溝; pinyin: Diàogōu). During the mid-8th century, the area was controlled by the Tibetan Empire. The area would later fall under the control of the Western Xia. In the late 15th and early 16th century, the area was ruled by the Tatars. In 1739, an administrator was sent by the Qianlong Emperor of the Qing dynasty to the region to manage local affairs. In 1757, Qing officials constructed a fort known as Hongshuibao (simplified Chinese: 红水堡; traditional Chinese: 紅水堡; pinyin: Hóngshuǐbǎo).

=== People's Republic of China ===
On September 12, 1949, the People's Liberation Army gained control of Jingtai County.

In 1955, the county was put under the jurisdiction of Dingxi Prefecture.

On April 4, 1958, Jingtai County was abolished and merged into Gaolan County. Shortly after, on December 20, 1958, Gaolan County was abolished and merged into the city of Baiyin. On November 15, 1961, Jingtai County was re-established under the jurisdiction of Baiyin.

From October 1963 to August 1985, Jingtai County was placed under the city of Wuwei, but was subsequently restored to Baiyin, which it remains part of today.

== Administrative divisions ==
Jingtai is divided into 8 towns and 3 townships:

Towns

- Yitiaoshan (一条山镇)
- Luyang (芦阳镇)
- Shangshawo (上沙沃镇)
- Xiquan (喜泉镇)
- Caowotan (草窝滩镇)
- Hongshui (红水镇)
- Zhongquan (中泉镇)
- Zhenglu (正路镇)

Townships

- Sitan Township (寺滩乡)
- Wufo Township (五佛乡)
- Manshuitan Township (漫水滩乡)

== Climate ==
Climate data for Jingtai, elevation 1,631 m (5,351 ft), (1991–2020 normals, extremes 1981–2010)
Month	Jan	Feb	Mar	Apr	May	Jun	Jul	Aug	Sep	Oct	Nov	Dec	Year
Record high °C (°F)	12.3 (54.1)	20.4 (68.7)	26.7 (80.1)	33.5 (92.3)	33.8 (92.8)	35.7 (96.3)	39.4 (102.9)	36.0 (96.8)	32.9 (91.2)	27.2 (81.0)	20.2 (68.4)	15.6 (60.1)	39.4 (102.9)
Mean daily maximum °C (°F)	0.8 (33.4)	5.3 (41.5)	11.7 (53.1)	18.7 (65.7)	23.4 (74.1)	27.5 (81.5)	29.2 (84.6)	27.6 (81.7)	22.5 (72.5)	16.3 (61.3)	9.1 (48.4)	2.4 (36.3)	16.2 (61.2)
Daily mean °C (°F)	−6.0 (21.2)	−1.6 (29.1)	4.8 (40.6)	11.7 (53.1)	16.7 (62.1)	21.0 (69.8)	22.7 (72.9)	21.1 (70.0)	16.1 (61.0)	9.5 (49.1)	2.3 (36.1)	−4.2 (24.4)	9.5 (49.1)
Mean daily minimum °C (°F)	−11.0 (12.2)	−7.0 (19.4)	−0.7 (30.7)	5.5 (41.9)	10.2 (50.4)	14.8 (58.6)	16.9 (62.4)	15.8 (60.4)	11.0 (51.8)	4.4 (39.9)	−2.7 (27.1)	−9.1 (15.6)	4.0 (39.2)
Record low °C (°F)	−23.6 (−10.5)	−20.8 (−5.4)	−16.9 (1.6)	−6.5 (20.3)	−3.5 (25.7)	4.1 (39.4)	8.5 (47.3)	6.5 (43.7)	0.3 (32.5)	−13.5 (7.7)	−16.4 (2.5)	−24.5 (−12.1)	−24.5 (−12.1)
Average precipitation mm (inches)	1.4 (0.06)	1.5 (0.06)	4.0 (0.16)	7.8 (0.31)	21.0 (0.83)	28.9 (1.14)	43.9 (1.73)	41.5 (1.63)	30.0 (1.18)	13.4 (0.53)	2.0 (0.08)	0.3 (0.01)	195.7 (7.72)
Average precipitation days (≥ 0.1 mm)	1.9	1.6	2.8	3.7	6.2	7.5	8.8	8.6	8.2	4.9	1.6	0.5	56.3
Average snowy days	3.6	3.0	3.5	1.5	0.1	0	0	0	0	1.3	2.6	1.9	17.5
Average relative humidity (%)	46	41	37	35	39	45	53	57	59	53	49	46	47
Mean monthly sunshine hours	203.9	198.9	227.7	237.9	261.1	257.1	258.2	238.9	204.2	212.7	209.4	204.6	2,714.6
Percentage possible sunshine	66	65	61	60	59	59	58	58	56	62	69	69	62
Source: China Meteorological Administration

== Economy ==
As of 2019, Jingtai County had a gross domestic product totaling ¥5.587 billion, and consumer retail sales totaling ¥2.02 billion. That year, the annual per capita disposable income of the county's urban residents totaled ¥28,264, and reached ¥11,719 for the county's rural residents. The county's primary sector comprises about 29% of Jingtai's gross domestic product, the secondary sector comprises about 25%, and the tertiary sector comprises about 46%.

Jingtai has 385 million tons in gypsum reserves, the second-largest amount in China. The county also has over 800 million tons of limestone, 380 million tons of coal, over 20 million tons of quartz, over 2 million tons of copper, and in addition some reserves of gold, silver, manganese, Moyu (black) jade, clay, and serpentine.

=== Agriculture ===
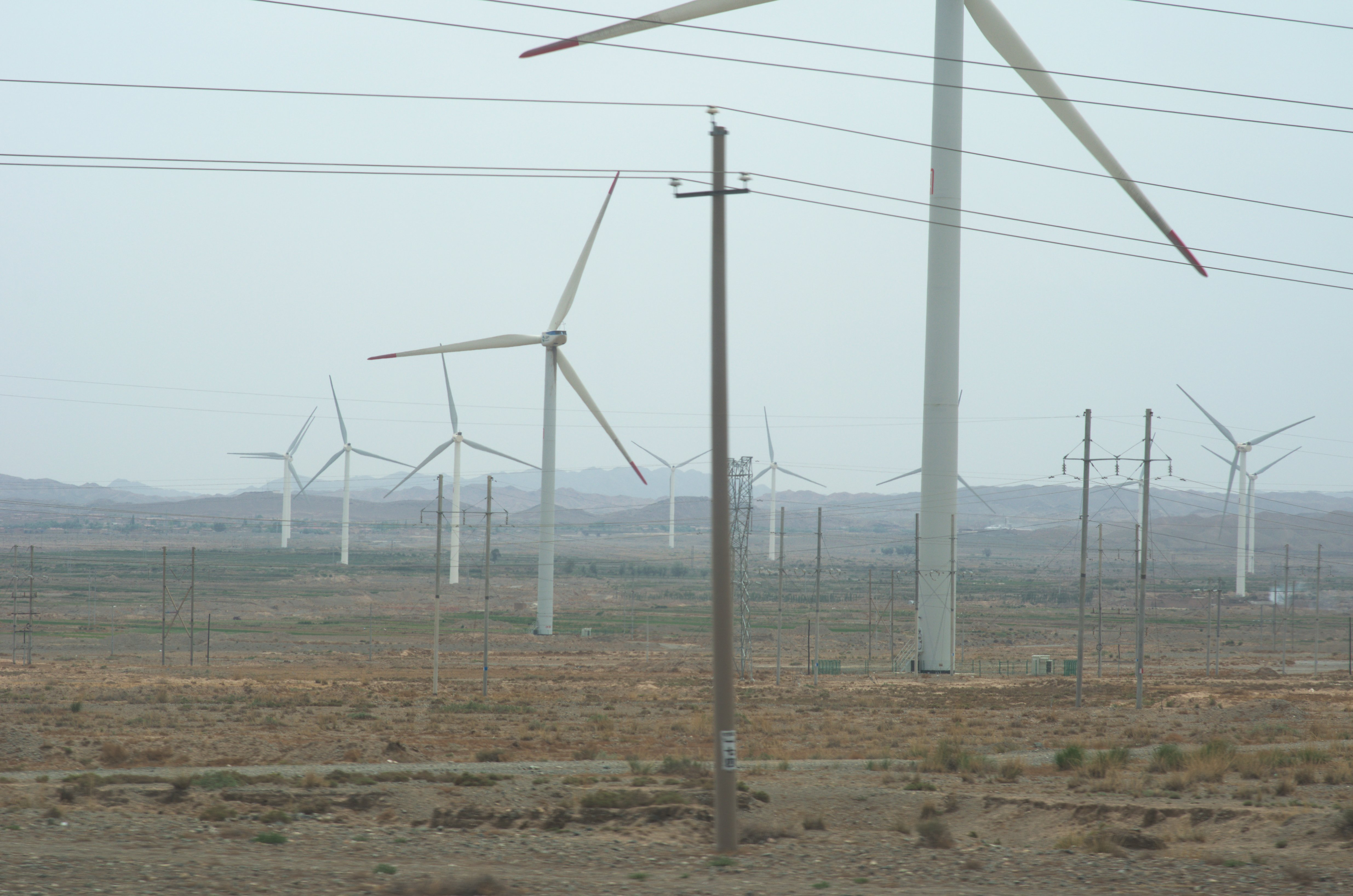
Wind farm in Xingquanbao, Jingtai County

Geographical location and special irrigation system provide Jingtai County with unique conditions for agricultural development. The Yellow River flows through Jingtai County for 112 kilometres (70 mi). The county is home to the Jingtaichuan Electric Power Lifting Irrigation Project (Chinese: 景泰川电力提灌工程), which is the largest in all of China, and in Asia. There are two large-scale, nationwide noted, irrigation projects with a total capacity of 245,600 kW and a water lifting capacity of 28.6 m^{3} per second.

The whole county has arable land of over 680 square kilometers and irrigated lands of nearly 400 square kilometers. Located at 37 degrees north latitude, Jingtai County experiences long hours of light and a large temperature difference between day and night. Crops grown in Jingtai include wheat, corn, pears, melons and apricot.

The special agricultural products mainly include desert wolfberry, pear, red date, Dajie apricot, apple, small grains, desert melon, Gobi fish, shrimp, crab, licorice, sheep. Among these products, "Jingtai wolfberry", "Tiaoshan pear", "Longwan apple", and "Cuiliu mutton" have obtained the certification for national agricultural product geographical indication.

A total of 62 products meets the "san pin yi biao" (Chinese: 三品一标; three types of products and the agricultural product geographical indication) and 47 products are considered as ‘green’, pollution-free, non-toxic, safe, and high-quality food.

=== Industry ===
Jingtai County's main industrial products include main industrial products, cement, calcium carbide, and ferroalloys. Other significant industrial products include ferro-silicon, malt, livestock feed, powdered gypsum, and coal.

== Tourism ==
Jingtai county is home to the following touristic sites:

=== Yellow River Stone Forest ===
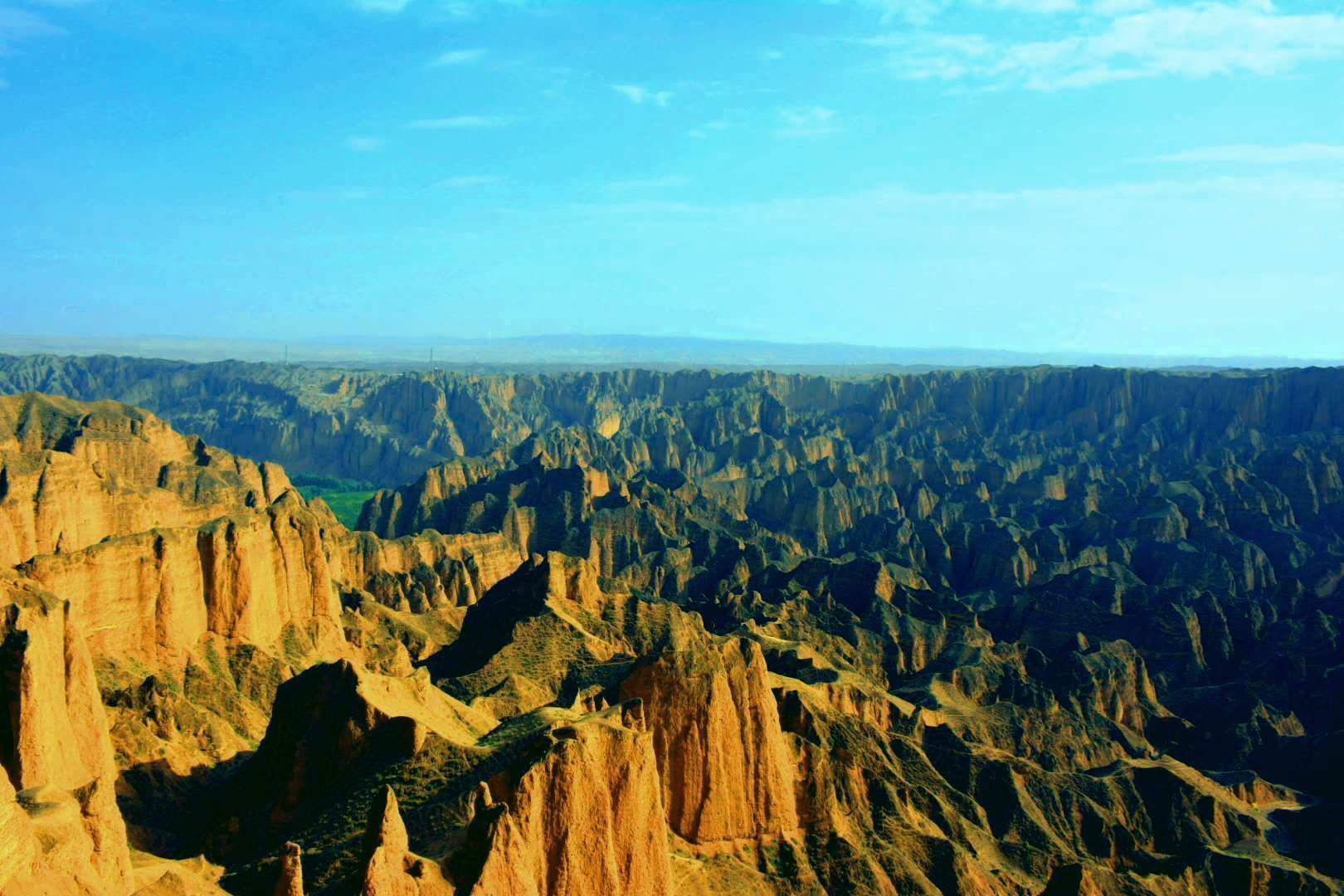
Yellow River Stone Forest

Yellow River Stone Forest is located in the southeast of Jingtai County, 70 kilometres (43 mi) from the county's urban center. It gained international prominence after the Gansu ultramarathon disaster, in which 21 runners died from hypothermia, happened there in May 2021.

Its landform is termed an "alluvial sandstone fenglin" (砂砾岩峰林). Fenglin, short for fenglin karst, is "a karst with isolated hills rising from a plain". Stone forest (石林) in Chinese refers to pinnacle-shaped karst, such as the ones in the Yellow River Stone Forest.

The park has a total area of 50 square kilometres (19 mi^{2}), and the ancient stone forest group covers 10 square kilometres (3.9 mi^{2}), which is formed in the lower Pleistocene Wuquanshan proluvial gravel layer 2.1 million years ago. The action of neotectonic movements, rain and flood erosions and gravitational collapse forms this peak cluster landscape with vertical and sharply contoured rock strata. It is a popular tourist attraction.

=== Yongtai Fortress ===
Yongtai Fortress is located in the north foot of Tiger Mountain (Chinese: 老虎山; pinyin: Lǎohǔ Shān), in Sitan Township, 25 kilometres (16 mi) west of the county's urban center. It is also called Yongtai tortoise city because of its tortoise-like castle. It a representative and well preserved military castle of Ming Dynasty along the Silk Road. Historically, the castle is an important part of the Ming Great Wall, which is built as a border defense system. Yongtai Fortress now serves as a national cultural relic, a historical village representing the culture of Gansu Province, and site for the shooting of various movies and television shows.

=== Shoulushan National Forest Park ===
Shoulushan National Forest Park is located at the junction of Gansu, Ningxia and Inner Mongolia. It is 39 kilometres (24 mi) away from the urban center Jingtai County, and covers an area of 10.86 square kilometres (4.19 mi^{2}). With an average altitude of 2,800 metres (9,200 ft), the park's monthly temperature from May to October averages between 2.2 °C (36.0 °F) and 15.2 °C (59.4 °F).

=== Great Dunhuang Film and Television City ===
The Great Dunhuang Film and Television City (Chinese: 大敦煌影视城) is a large filmmaking complex located along Gansu Provincial Road 201, located in Dashuizha Village (Chinese: 大水䃎村), in the town of Xiquan. The complex includes many ancient buildings, caves, archways, city gate towers, a street imitating Ming Dynasty and Qing Dynasty, artificial lakes, and other natural scenes. Within the film-making studio murals, sculptures, and giant Buddhas are created in the style of Mogao Grottoes in Dunhuang.

- Over 20 kilometers away from the Jingtai County, the Great Dunhuang Film-making Base is on the road that connects Yellow River Stone Forest, Yongtai Fortress and Shoulushan National Forest Park. Convenient transportation and location advantages of natural scenes provide this place with unique conditions for creating films and art work represent Western China.
- In 2004, Chen Jialin, a famous Chinese director, happened to find this red stone mountain on the way to Jingtai County. The strange trend of this mountain with uneven pits and densely distributed caves is similar to Mogao Grottoes in Dunhuang. He decided to copy the Mogao Grottoes here as the location for his TV series The Great Dunhuang.
- In 2005, Jingtai County invested 6 million yuan to build this film-making base.
- In 2006, the Great Dunhuang Film-making Base was listed as a provincial film-making base. More than 60 movies and TV series have been filmed here by 2019.

== Culture ==
=== Film and TV series ===
- Welcome to Shama Town (set in Yongtai Fortress)
- The Myth (set in Yellow River Stone Forest)
- Oh My General (set in Yellow River Stone Forest)
- The Great Dunhuang (set in the Great Dunhuang Film-making Base)
- Tian Xia Liang Cang

=== Activities ===
Jingtai County has held the Yellow River Stone Forest international hiking race with over tens of thousands of people, the Yellow River Stone Forest culture and tourism festival, Wufo red date festival, and other major events representing unique scenes and agricultural products of Jingtai.

== Transport ==
- China National Highway 338
- G2012 Dingbian–Wuwei Expressway
- G1816 Wuhai–Maqên Expressway (under construction)
- Baotou–Lanzhou railway

== See also ==
- List of administrative divisions of Gansu
