= The Great Dunhuang =

- DVD cover art
- 大敦煌
- Genre: Historical fiction
- Screenplay by: Zhang Rui
- Directed by: Chen Jialin
- Presented by: Li Xiangping; Zhu Tong; Yan Gang
- Starring: Tang Guoqiang; Chen Hao; Wei Zi; Yvonne Yung; Li Jianqun; Huang Haibing; Liao Jingsheng; Shi Xiaoman; Xia Fan
- Theme music composer: Kay Huang; Dao Lang
- Opening theme: "Sun and Moon of Dunhuang" (敦煌日月) by Sun Nan
- Ending theme: "No Regrets" (不悔) by Tsai Chin
- Composers: Shen Guangyuan; Luo Hongwu; Wu Xuan
- Country of origin: China
- Original language: Mandarin
- No. of episodes: 46

Production
- Producers: Sun Xisheng; Liang Heping; Ye Xinping; Xu Ying; Cao Biao; Sun Yi; Zhang Mingtai; Lan Manxia; Lü Xiamin; Ge Xiaozheng; Li Shilin; Han Sanping; Zhang Shengyou; Jiang Xiaosong
- Production location: Jingtai County
- Cinematography: Chen Ke; Ma Ge
- Editor: Jiao Chunling
- Running time: ≈45 minutes per episode
- Production companies: China Intercontinental Communication Centre; CCTV; China Guoan Culture & Media Investment Corporation

Original release
- Network: CCTV
- Release: 31 October – 25 November 2006

The Great Dunhuang (大敦煌) is a Chinese television series based on the history of the oasis city of Dunhuang, which lies on the ancient Silk Road. With a Buddhist sutra printed in gold lettering as the plot device, the series retells the rise, fall, and rebirth of Dunhuang in three parts, each covering a different period in Chinese history: the Western Xia, the late Qing dynasty, and the Republican era. The series was first broadcast in mainland China on CCTV from 31 October to 25 November 2006.

== Synopsis ==
The original version did not have titles for the three parts. The Japanese DVD version, however, gave the following titles: Part One, "Western Xia Invades" (西夏来襲), Part Two, "Foreign Countries Get Involved" (異国介入), and Part Three, "Hidden Treasures Are Recovered" (秘宝奪還).

=== Part One (episodes 1–12) ===
Part One is set in the 11th century during the Song dynasty. After Khotan is destroyed by the Kara-Khanid Khanate, the Khotan princess Meiduo flees to Dunhuang to join her sister Zhenniang. Along the way, she meets Li Yuanhao, the ambitious ruler of Western Xia. Li, who has set his sights on conquering Dunhuang, sends his general Wangrong to escort Meiduo to Dunhuang and pass a message to Cao Shunde, the Song-appointed governor of Dunhuang. Wangrong, speaking on Li's behalf, seeks permission for the Western Xia army to pass through Dunhuang so that they can help Meiduo take revenge by attacking the Kara-Khanid Khanate. In truth, Li is plotting to take over Dunhuang once his army enters the city.

Li and Cao used to be rivals a decade ago because both of them fell in love with Zhenniang, who eventually married Cao. Cao sees through Li's ruse and secretly sends a messenger to seek reinforcements. The Song dynasty is unable to assist as they are at war with the Liao dynasty, so they send Fang Tianyou, a Hanlin Academy artist, to Dunhuang to resolve the crisis. Fang brings with him a Buddhist sutra printed in gold lettering in the hope that the sutra will increase the city's sanctity and make Li think twice about invasion.

In Dunhuang, Fang meets Meiduo and they fall in love at first sight. However, Wangrong also has feelings for Meiduo so he uses Western Xia's influence to pressure Cao into agreeing to let him marry Meiduo. Concurrently, Li asks to borrow the Buddhist sutra for a few days, but Cao denies his request. Li then sends his forces to occupy Guazhou and says that the town will be the bride price for the marriage between Wangrong and Meiduo.

Cao and Fang discuss plans to counter Li's aggressive advances. Fang proposes forming alliances with other kingdoms against Western Xia. However, their offers are rejected by those kingdoms as they fear Western Xia's military might, and Dunhuang becomes even more isolated. Eventually, it is clear that the only way to ensure peace between Dunhuang and Western Xia is for Meiduo to marry Wangrong. However, on her wedding night, Meiduo escapes and goes to find Fang. Wangrong is angered when Meiduo is nowhere to be found, so he leads his troops to attack Dunhuang. Cao's subordinates, already displeased with their superior for his indecisiveness, betray and kill him in the ensuing battle. Dunhuang ultimately falls. Zhenniang commits suicide by throwing herself into a fire after making Li promise her that he will not massacre the city's population.

Wangrong's search for Meiduo leads him to the Mogao Caves, where he ravages the sacred grounds and slaughters innocents. Meiduo realises that there is no escape and she leaps off a cliff to prevent Wangrong from harming Fang. Fang wanders around aimlessly in the Taklamakan Desert, holding a piece of the Buddhist sutra. He encounters a sandstorm. When the dust clears, only the sutra is left. In the far distance, Wangrong, maddened by his grief over Meiduo's death, rides towards the horizon, tightly hugging Meiduo's dead body in his arms.

=== Part Two (episodes 13–30) ===
Part Two is set around the turn of the 20th century towards the end of the Qing dynasty. Qin Wenming, an official from the Ministry of Works, is commissioned to find jade in Dunhuang. He disappears mysteriously and leaves behind no traces. His lover Chunxia suffers from depression after his disappearance and loses her sanity.

Qin's twin brother, Qin Wenyu, travels to Dunhuang in search of his brother and discovers a conspiracy. He is determined to unravel the mystery behind his brother's disappearance so remains there, relying on the local magistrate for help. He also befriends the camel trader Feng Dagang, the craftsman Wang Youxiang, and Wang's daughter Xinghua. He encounters a bandit chief Honglian and Chunxia, who recovers after mistaking him for his brother. With assistance from his companions, Qin makes a startling discovery that the clue to his brother's disappearance lies in a piece of a Buddhist sutra left behind by his brother. He concludes that the sutra is an ancient artefact from Dunhuang and believes that there is something hidden in the oasis city.

In the meantime, two British explorers arrive in Dunhuang to hunt for treasure. The magistrate denies them permission to carry out their activities. An earthquake occurs and the Buddhist manuscripts concealed in the Mogao Caves are revealed. The explorers bribe a corrupt priest to allow them to steal the manuscripts and leave Dunhuang. Qin sees the manuscripts as national treasures to be protected, so he urges the magistrate to arrest the explorers. Just then, news arrives in Dunhuang about the Eight-Nation Alliance's occupation of Beijing and the Qing government's agreement to peace talks. The magistrate switches sides and becomes friendly towards the British explorers, even allowing them to leave with the manuscripts.

Disappointed with the magistrate's decision, Qin decides to take matters into his own hands, taking along his friends with him to hunt down the explorers and retrieve the manuscripts. They fall into an ambush laid by the magistrate and his men, who intend to capture Honglian and claim the bounty on her head. Chunxia sacrifices herself to save Honglian; Qin, Honglian, Feng and their companions are killed by the magistrate's men. The manuscripts ultimately end up the hands of the British.

=== Part Three (episodes 31–46) ===
Part Three is set in 1936 during the Republican era just before the Second Sino-Japanese War. Liang Moyan, a painter, and his wife Su Qingping, a sculptor, want to fulfil their dream of restoring the ancient city of Dunhuang. However, their task is not going to be easy as there are various opposing factors at hand: Dunhuang is in ruins due to a long history of tomb-raiding and desecration; the couple run into trouble with bandits; the local residents are indifferent towards the idea of reviving Dunhuang; foreigners have also set their sights on the city; the local government is inept and keeps shoving responsibilities around.

Liang and Su are unwilling to give up on their quest and they start preserving artefacts and rebuilding Dunhuang. With their sheer determination and sincerity, they move many people and even succeed in influencing the younger generation to continue their work. However, the couple also sacrifice themselves in their fight against grave robbers and plunderers.

Chiba Sanrō, a young artist from Japan who has a fervent interest in Dunhuang, travels to the oasis city. He has received a secret order from the Japanese military to find the Buddhist sutra printed in gold lettering. Despite his passion for art, he has been strongly influenced by his militarist background and he harbours prejudiced views against the Chinese people. During his encounters with Liang and Su, his soul experiences an unprecedented shock and baptism. The personal struggles and reflections he went through eventually prompt him to overcome his hostility towards the Chinese and make a fresh start in life.

The stories of Liang, Su and Chiba tell us that Dunhuang's heritage truly belongs to those who know how to appreciate and preserve it.

== Cast ==
=== Part One ===
- Tang Guoqiang as Li Yuanhao
- Chen Hao as Meiduo
- Huang Haibing as Fang Tianyou
- Ren Tianye as Wangrong
- Liao Jingsheng as Cao Shunde
- Deng Ying as Zhenniang
- Zhang Guangzheng as Wuchen
- Liu Dagang as Ashena
- Lu Yong as Zhang Yingshou
- Xue Haowen as Luo Zan

=== Part Two ===
- Wan Hongjie as Qin Wenyu
- Tao Feifei as Chunxia
- Shang Tiantong as Honglian
- Gao Lancun as Magistrate Yan
- Shi Xiaoman as Jiang Xiaoci
- Su Tingshi as Priest Wang
- Li Zhi as Liu Dakui
- Dania as John
- Mohammed as Baker
- Luo Xuwu as Feng Dagang
- Wei Deshan as Wang Youxiang
- Chen Baojia as Master Zhao
- Wu Jiayi as Ma Quande
- Hu Xiaoting as Xinghua
- Sun Di as Choudan
- Wang Xuanyin as Shuimei
- Zhang Tielin as a Qing governor

=== Part Three ===
- Wei Zi as Liang Moyan
- Li Jianqun as Su Qingping
- Xia Fan as Chiba Sanrō
- Yvonne Yung as Hongliu
- Wang Huichun as Chen Yizhong
- Zhang Qiuge as Dou Heizi
- Lu Jun as Lu Jingru
- Wang Jun as Takeno
- Chang Chuan as Tang Liancheng
- Liu Peiqing as He Fugui
- Liu Sha as Li Yaqin
- Ma Jing as Yanzi
- Wang Lanwu as Sun Shichang
- Ding Haifeng as Miyamoto
