= Lanzhou Prison =

Prison in Lanzhou, China

Coordinates: 36.08376°N 103.83988°E

Lanzhou Prison is a high-security prison in Lanzhou, Gansu, China. The prison grounds include several workshops where prisoners work.

== Prison regime ==
It is claimed by activists that since 1999, over 2000 Falun Gong practitioners have been detained at the prison. These prisoners have been tortured, and some have been executed without giving notice to their family members. In another controversial case, activists claimed a Tibetan monk was imprisoned at Lanzhou Prison for exposing police brutality. A journalist reported that he had endured humiliating torture methods after being detained for criticizing the justice system. According to his experiences, prisoners were deprived of food and medical care, and prisoners who did not finish their forced labour tasks were tortured.
