= Haixing County =

Haixing County 海兴县
- County
- Location in Hebei
- Coordinates: 38°09′N 117°29′E
- Country: People's Republic of China
- Province: Hebei
- Prefecture-level city: Cangzhou
- Township-level divisions: 3 towns 4 townships
- County seat: Suji Town (苏基镇)

Area
  - Total: 836 km^{2} (323 sq mi)
- Elevation: 8.5 m (28 ft)

Population (2020 census)
  - Total: 189,273
  - Density: 226/km^{2} (586/sq mi)
- Time zone: UTC+8 (China Standard)
- Postal code: 061200
- Area code: 0317

Haixing County (simplified Chinese: 海兴县; traditional Chinese: 海興縣; pinyin: Hǎixīng Xiàn) is a county of southeastern Hebei province, China, bordering Shandong to the southeast. It is administered by Cangzhou City, and, as of 2020, had a population of 189,273 residing in an area of 836 km^{2} (323 sq mi). Both G18 Rongcheng–Wuhai Expressway and G25 Changchun–Shenzhen Expressway pass through the county.

== Administrative divisions ==
The county administers 3 towns and 4 townships.

Towns:

- Suji (苏基镇), Xinji (辛集镇), Gaowan (高湾镇)

Townships:

- Zhaomaotao Township (赵毛陶乡), Xiangfang Township (香坊乡), Xiaoshan Township (小山乡), Zhanghuiting Township (张会亭乡)

== Climate ==
Climate data for Haixing, elevation 5 m (16 ft), (1991–2020 normals, extremes 1981–present)
Month	Jan	Feb	Mar	Apr	May	Jun	Jul	Aug	Sep	Oct	Nov	Dec	Year
Record high °C (°F)	17.0 (62.6)	21.5 (70.7)	29.8 (85.6)	32.2 (90.0)	38.4 (101.1)	41.1 (106.0)	42.2 (108.0)	37.2 (99.0)	35.5 (95.9)	31.8 (89.2)	24.6 (76.3)	17.1 (62.8)	42.2 (108.0)
Mean daily maximum °C (°F)	2.7 (36.9)	6.4 (43.5)	13.3 (55.9)	20.8 (69.4)	26.9 (80.4)	31.3 (88.3)	32.0 (89.6)	30.4 (86.7)	27.0 (80.6)	20.4 (68.7)	11.5 (52.7)	4.3 (39.7)	18.9 (66.0)
Daily mean °C (°F)	−3.1 (26.4)	0.3 (32.5)	6.8 (44.2)	14.2 (57.6)	20.6 (69.1)	25.3 (77.5)	27.2 (81.0)	25.9 (78.6)	21.4 (70.5)	14.4 (57.9)	5.9 (42.6)	−1.0 (30.2)	13.2 (55.7)
Mean daily minimum °C (°F)	−7.7 (18.1)	−4.5 (23.9)	1.4 (34.5)	8.3 (46.9)	14.4 (57.9)	19.7 (67.5)	23.0 (73.4)	22.0 (71.6)	16.6 (61.9)	9.4 (48.9)	1.4 (34.5)	−5.2 (22.6)	8.2 (46.8)
Record low °C (°F)	−21.2 (−6.2)	−18.2 (−0.8)	−12.4 (9.7)	−4.7 (23.5)	2.5 (36.5)	8.0 (46.4)	15.5 (59.9)	13.3 (55.9)	5.2 (41.4)	−3.1 (26.4)	−14.2 (6.4)	−20.8 (−5.4)	−21.2 (−6.2)
Average precipitation mm (inches)	2.5 (0.10)	7.1 (0.28)	6.8 (0.27)	22.4 (0.88)	41.2 (1.62)	76.0 (2.99)	162.1 (6.38)	163.8 (6.45)	41.7 (1.64)	35.4 (1.39)	13.9 (0.55)	3.2 (0.13)	576.1 (22.68)
Average precipitation days (≥ 0.1 mm)	1.6	2.3	2.7	4.8	6.0	7.8	11.0	9.9	5.8	5.0	3.2	1.9	62
Average snowy days	2.3	2.3	0.8	0.1	0	0	0	0	0	0	1.0	1.3	7.8
Average relative humidity (%)	60	57	53	55	59	63	76	80	72	66	66	62	64
Mean monthly sunshine hours	167.0	176.1	222.5	227.4	258.7	228.3	178.4	183.4	208.5	198.7	168.5	163.4	2,380.9
Percentage possible sunshine	55	57	60	57	59	52	40	44	57	58	56	55	54
Source: China Meteorological Administrationall-time August high
