= Jingyuan County, Gansu =

Jingyuan County 靖远县
- County
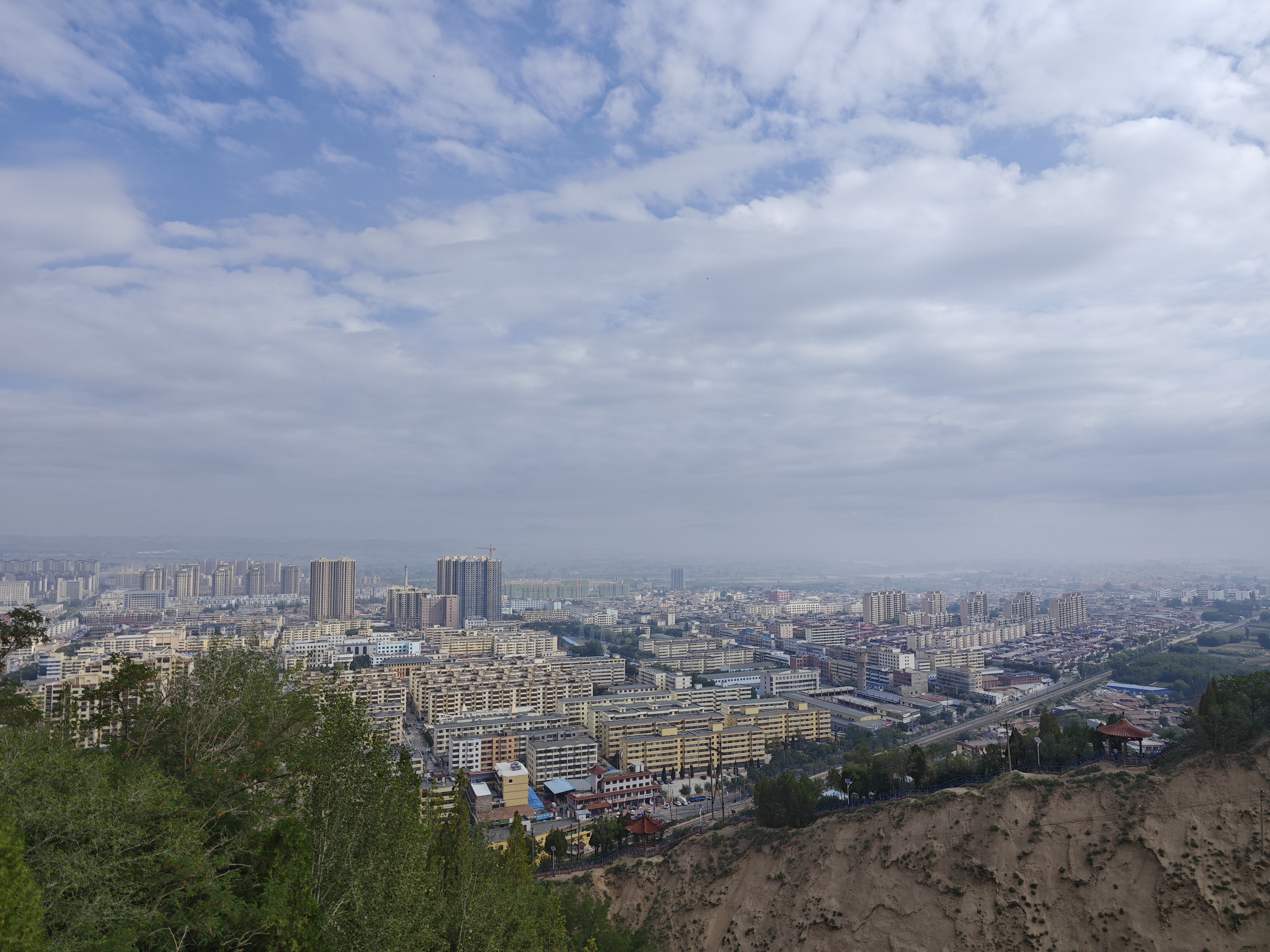
- Wulan (乌兰镇), seat of Jingyuan county

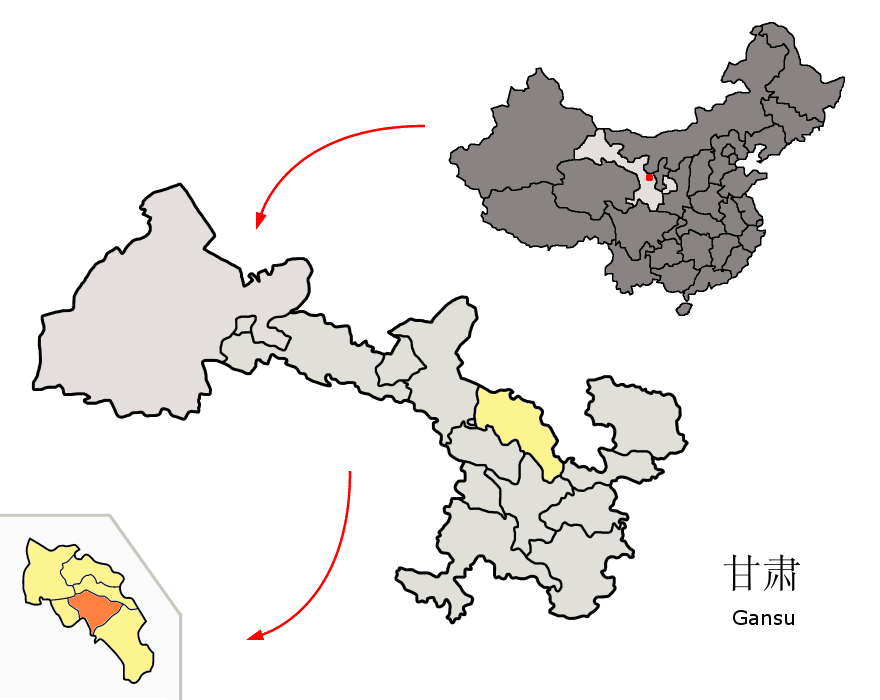
- Location in Baiyin, Gansu

- Location of the seat in Gansu
- Coordinates: 36°34′N 104°41′E
- Country: China
- Province: Gansu
- Prefecture-level city: Baiyin
- County seat: Wulan

Area
  - County: 5,809.4 km^{2} (2,243.0 sq mi)
- Elevation: 1,298 m (4,259 ft)

Population (December 2019)
  - County: 503,441
  - Density: 86.660/km^{2} (224.45/sq mi)
  - Urban: 164,068
- Time zone: UTC+8 (China Standard)
- Postal code: 730600
- Website: www.jingyuan.gov.cn

Jingyuan (simplified Chinese: 靖远; traditional Chinese: 靖遠; pinyin: Jìngyuǎn) is a Chinese county in the east of Gansu province. It is under the administration of Baiyin prefecture, and consists of two separate tracts of territory to the north and south of Pingchuan district. The northern tract borders Ningxia to the north. The southern area consists of an irrigated area around the Yellow River and the northern area is semi-arid highlands.

== History ==
The name originated from 'settling down in the borderlands'. Jingyuan belonged to the Yiqu kingdom, later becoming part of the Qin state. The county was first established during the Han dynasty in 114 BC. During the Western Wei it was known as Huizhou (会州), the defensive outpost of Huining County. It was located at the battleground of the Northern Song dynasty and the Western Xia. In 1730 the county got its current name. In 1928, Jingyuan was transferred from Shaanxi to Gansu. Jingyuan has extensive coal reserves, part of the Yaojie Formation, as well as Palygorskite clay reserves of 1 billion tons.

== Administrative divisions ==
Jingyuan County is divided to 13 towns and 5 townships.

Towns

- Beiwan (北湾镇)
- Dongwan (东湾镇)
- Wulan (乌兰镇)
- Liuchuan (刘川镇)
- Beitan (北滩镇)
- Wuhe (五合镇)
- Dalu (大芦镇)
- Mitan (糜滩镇)
- Gaowan (高湾镇)
- Pingbao (平堡镇)
- Dongsheng (东升镇)
- Shuanglong (双龙镇)
- Sandan (三滩镇)

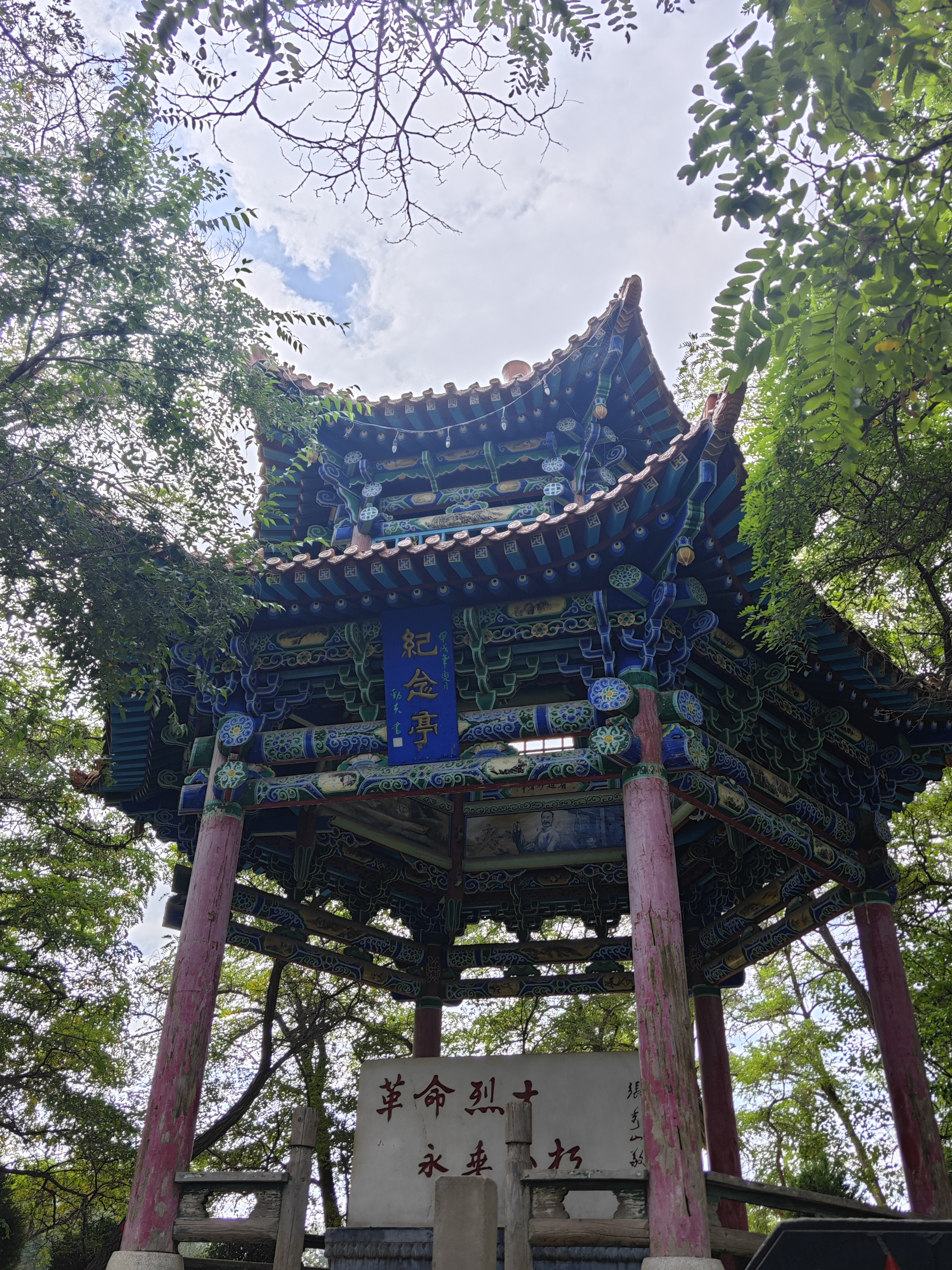
Memorial dedicated to the Chinese Red Army soldiers martyred during the Long March, Mt. Wulan

Townships

- Xinglong (兴隆乡)
- Shimen (石门乡)
- Jing'an (靖安乡)
- Yongxin (永新乡)
- Ruoli (若笠乡)

== Climate ==
Climate data for Jingyuan, elevation 1,398 m (4,587 ft), (1991–2020 normals, extremes 1981–2010)
Month	Jan	Feb	Mar	Apr	May	Jun	Jul	Aug	Sep	Oct	Nov	Dec	Year
Record high °C (°F)	11.1 (52.0)	21.6 (70.9)	27.5 (81.5)	34.1 (93.4)	34.5 (94.1)	36.0 (96.8)	39.5 (103.1)	36.5 (97.7)	34.3 (93.7)	27.3 (81.1)	19.2 (66.6)	9.3 (48.7)	39.5 (103.1)
Mean daily maximum °C (°F)	1.2 (34.2)	6.7 (44.1)	13.5 (56.3)	20.4 (68.7)	24.8 (76.6)	28.6 (83.5)	30.2 (86.4)	28.7 (83.7)	23.7 (74.7)	17.4 (63.3)	9.6 (49.3)	2.3 (36.1)	17.3 (63.1)
Daily mean °C (°F)	−6.3 (20.7)	−1.1 (30.0)	5.8 (42.4)	12.5 (54.5)	17.3 (63.1)	21.6 (70.9)	23.2 (73.8)	21.8 (71.2)	16.6 (61.9)	9.9 (49.8)	2.1 (35.8)	−4.8 (23.4)	9.9 (49.8)
Mean daily minimum °C (°F)	−11.7 (10.9)	−6.8 (19.8)	−0.2 (31.6)	5.6 (42.1)	10.5 (50.9)	15.0 (59.0)	17.2 (63.0)	16.1 (61.0)	11.4 (52.5)	4.4 (39.9)	−2.9 (26.8)	−9.8 (14.4)	4.1 (39.3)
Record low °C (°F)	−23.8 (−10.8)	−22.5 (−8.5)	−13.3 (8.1)	−5.4 (22.3)	−1.6 (29.1)	5.5 (41.9)	9.3 (48.7)	6.7 (44.1)	0.4 (32.7)	−9.8 (14.4)	−13.1 (8.4)	−24.3 (−11.7)	−24.3 (−11.7)
Average precipitation mm (inches)	2.2 (0.09)	2.7 (0.11)	5.0 (0.20)	11.6 (0.46)	27.7 (1.09)	31.2 (1.23)	46.3 (1.82)	49.5 (1.95)	30.2 (1.19)	17.9 (0.70)	2.7 (0.11)	1.0 (0.04)	228 (8.99)
Average precipitation days (≥ 0.1 mm)	2.1	1.7	2.4	4.3	6.4	7.2	9.0	8.0	8.9	5.9	2.0	1.0	58.9
Average snowy days	3.7	3.2	2.4	0.6	0.1	0	0	0	0	0.6	2.1	1.9	14.6
Average relative humidity (%)	58	52	46	43	47	52	60	63	68	67	64	62	57
Mean monthly sunshine hours	196.2	204.1	234.0	243.0	263.8	258.2	259.9	247.2	204.2	210.5	201.6	202.2	2,724.9
Percentage possible sunshine	63	66	63	61	60	59	59	60	56	61	67	68	62
Source: China Meteorological Administration

== Transport ==
- G6 Beijing–Lhasa Expressway
- China National Highway 109
- China National Highway 247
- Honghui Railway
- Yinchuan–Lanzhou high-speed railway

== See also ==
- List of administrative divisions of Gansu
- Tai'an Village, Beiwan, Jingyuan
