= National Paralympic Games =

The National Paralympic Games are high-level multi-sport events held at the national level by the International Paralympic Committee and national Paralympic Committees in non-Olympic years. The events provide competitions for disabled athletes.

The Games trace their origins to the 1948 Stoke Mandeville Games, created by Ludwig Guttmann for World War II veterans with spinal injuries, which evolved into the modern Paralympic movement.

== Sports ==
In the Paralympic Games athletes are divided into different categories based on their disability the categories include:

- Amputee: Athletes with a partial or total loss of at least one limb.
- Cerebral Palsy: Athletes with non-progressive brain damage, for example cerebral palsy, traumatic brain injury, stroke or similar disabilities affecting muscle control, balance or coordination.
- Intellectual impairment: Athletes with a significant intellectual impairment and associated limitations in adaptive behaviour. (Eligible since reinstatement after 2008 with strict criteria.)
- Wheelchair: Athletes with spinal cord injuries and other disabilities which require them to compete in a wheelchair.
- Visually Impaired: Athletes with vision impairment ranging from partial vision, sufficient to be judged legally blind, to total blindness.

(Note: These are broad groups; the IPC now uses 10 eligible impairment types (e.g., impaired muscle power, hypertonia, ataxia, limb deficiency, short stature, vision impairment, intellectual impairment), with sport-specific functional classifications.)

Athletes with a physical disability that does not fall strictly under one of the other five categories, such as dwarfism, multiple sclerosis or congenital deformities of the limbs such as that caused by thalidomide.

The events that the athletes can participate in are IPC Alpine Skiing, Archery, IPC Athletics, Biathlon, Boccia, Canoe, Cross-country skiing, Cycling, Equestrian, Football 5-a-side, Football 7-a-a-side, Goalball, IPC Iced Sledge Hockey, Judo, IPC Powerlifting, Rowing, Sailing, IPC Shooting, Sitting Volleyball, IPC Swimming, Table tennis, Triathlon, Wheelchair Basketball, Wheelchair curling, Wheelchair dance, Wheelchair fencing, Wheelchair rugby, and Wheelchair tennis.

== List of national Paralympic Games ==
- Canadian Paralympic Athletics Championships
- National Paralympic Games of China
