= Baiyin =

Baiyin 白银市
- Prefecture-level city
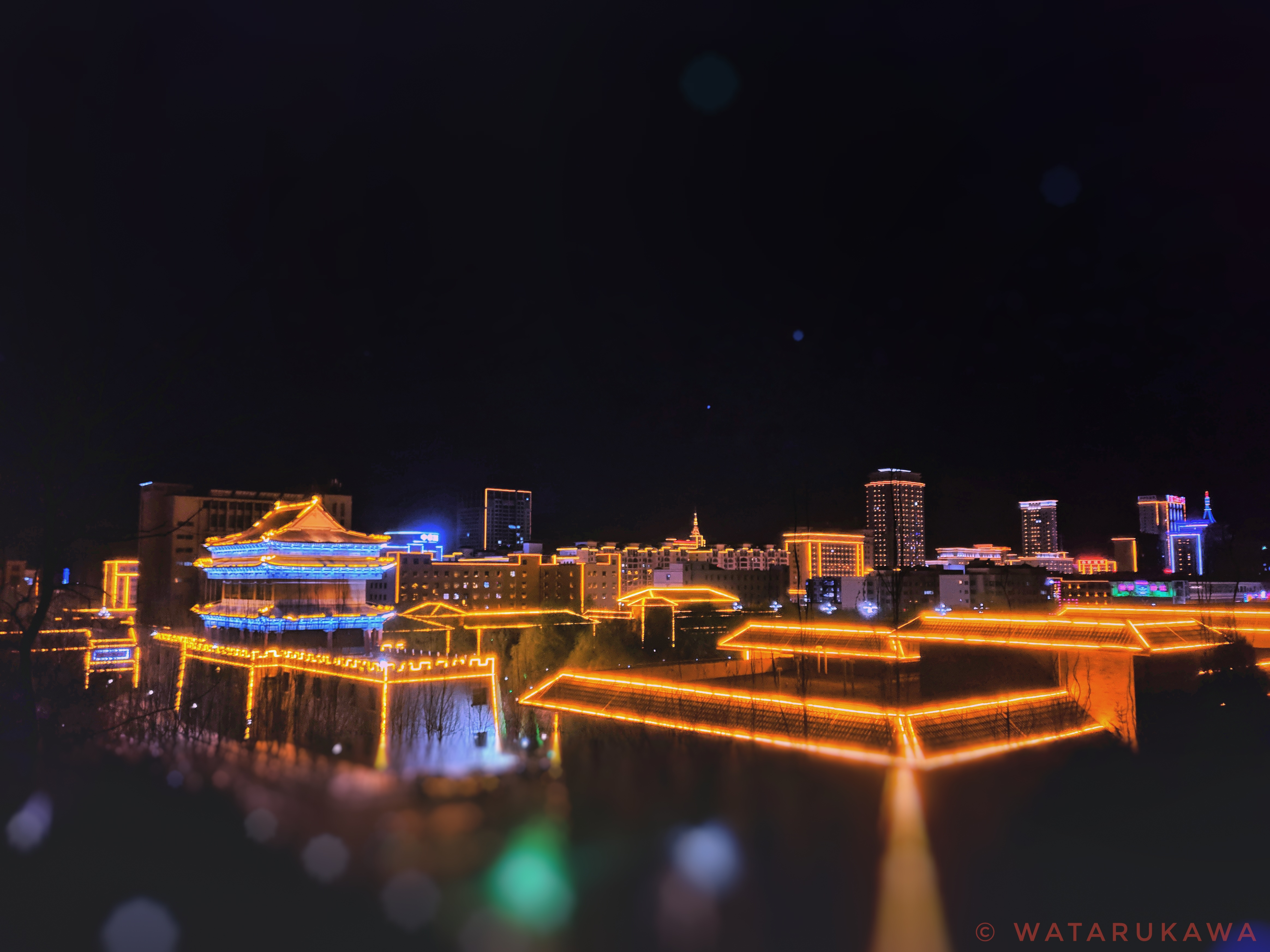
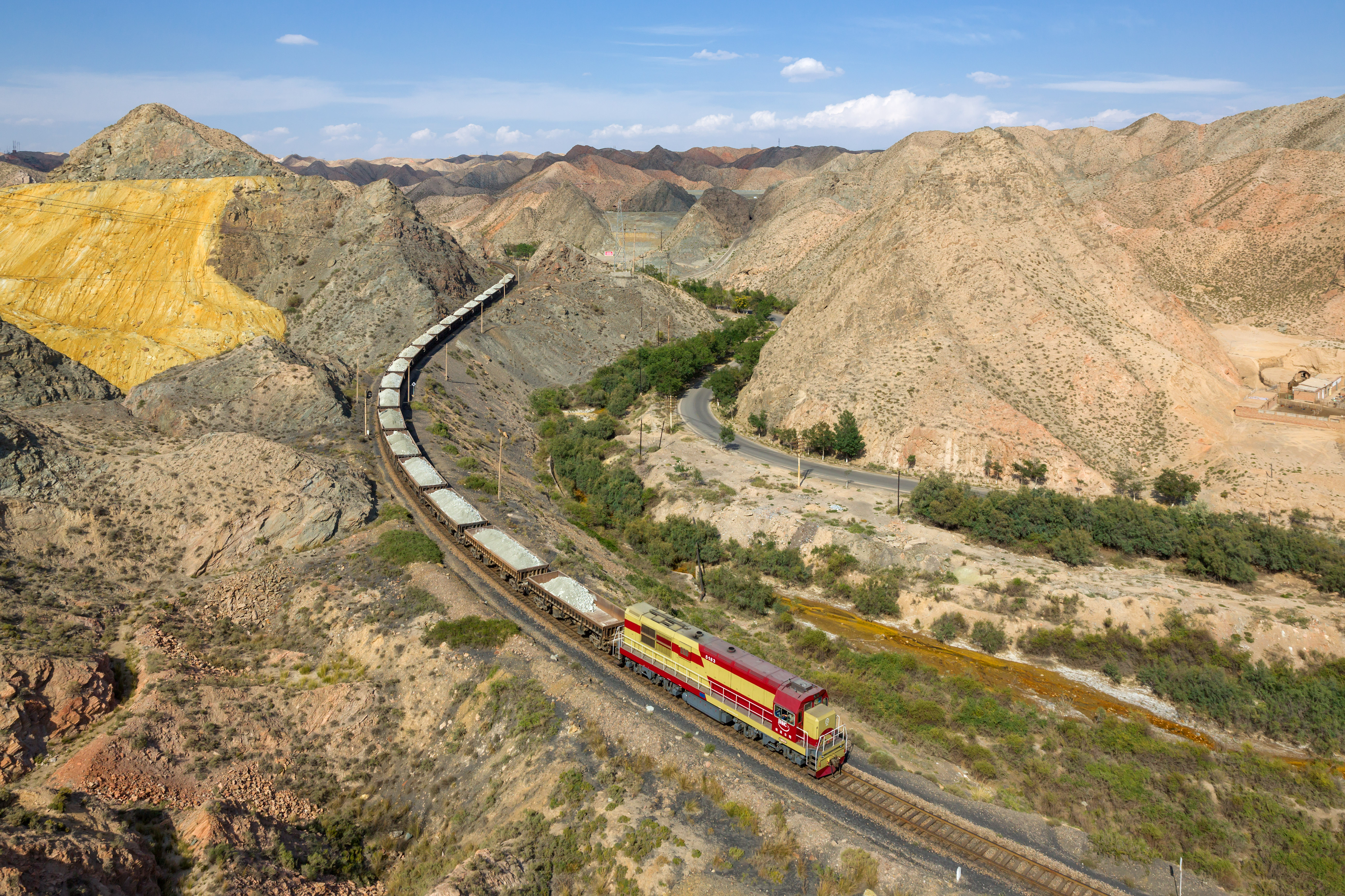
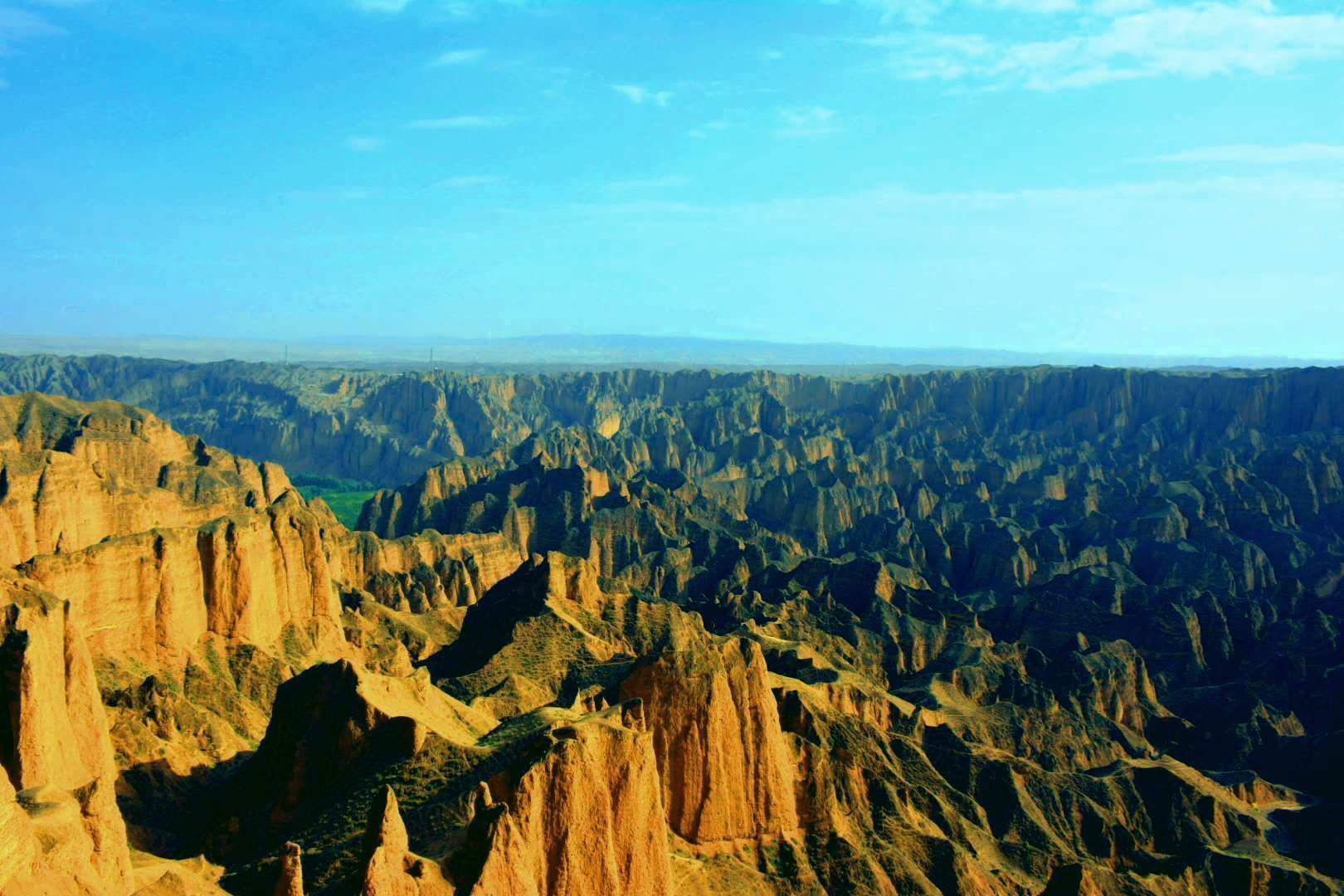
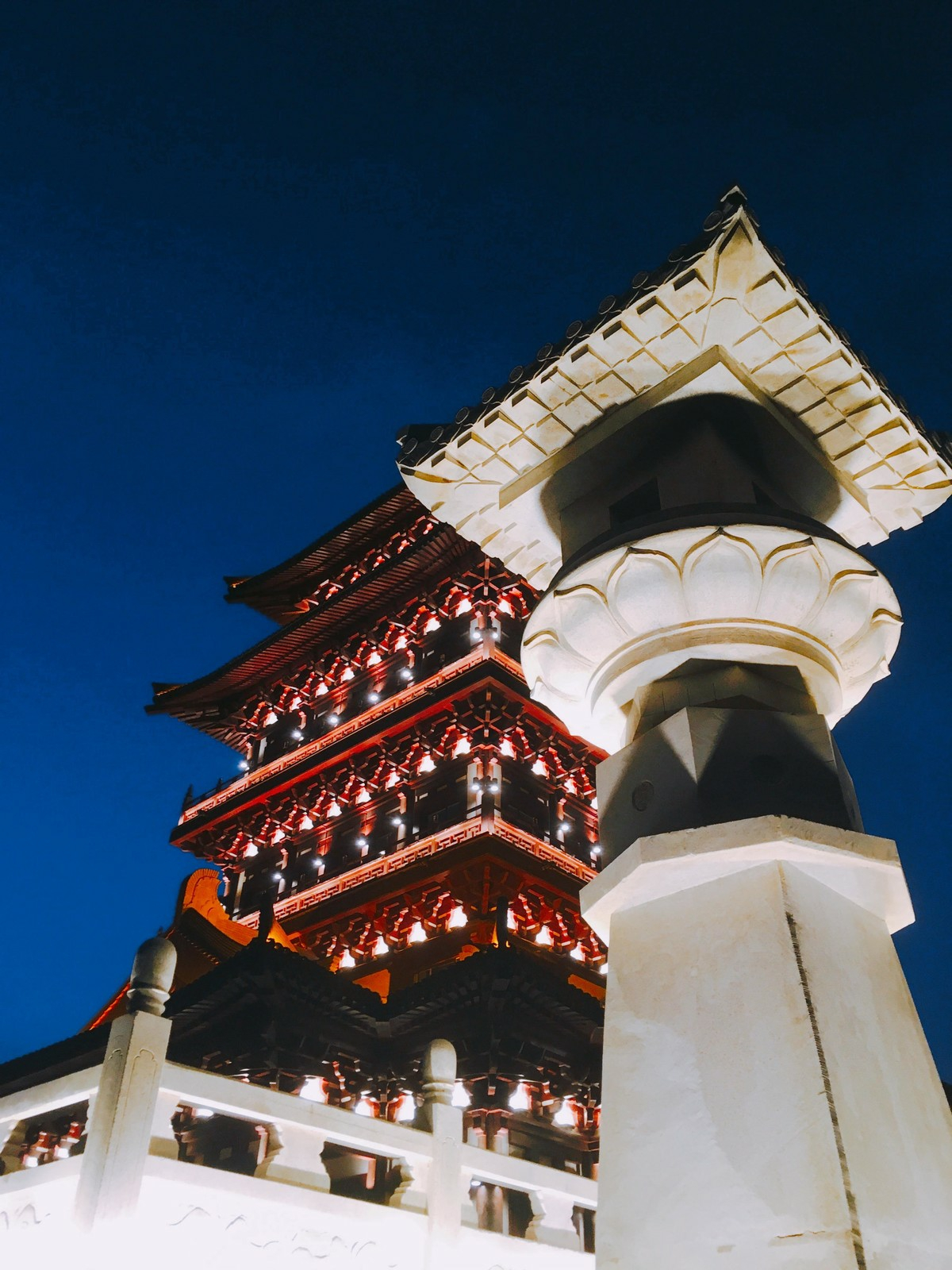
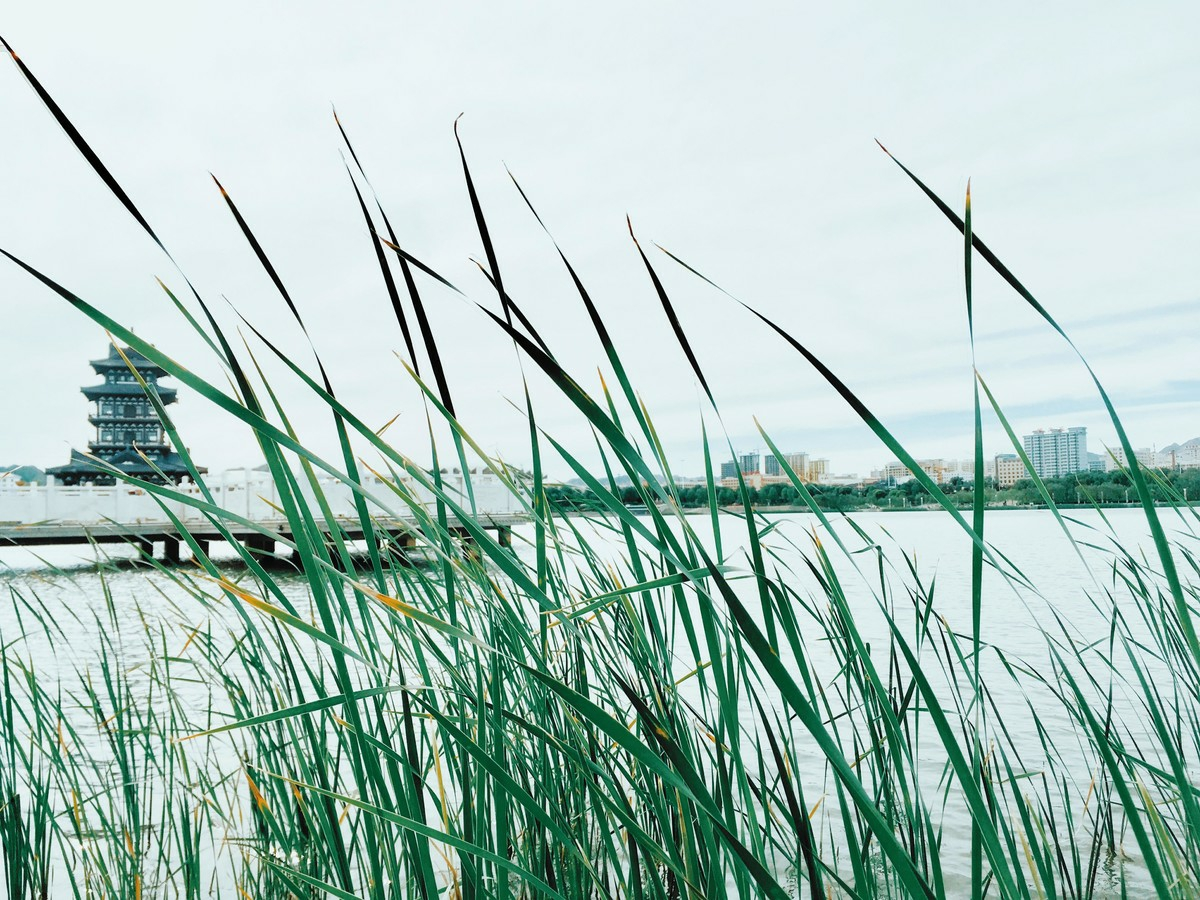
- Clockwise from top: Xicheng District at night, the Yellow River Stone Forest, Yinfeng Lake, Wenyuan Pavilion at night, and an ore train from the Baiyin zinc mine to the refinery.
- Nickname: 铜城 (Copper City)
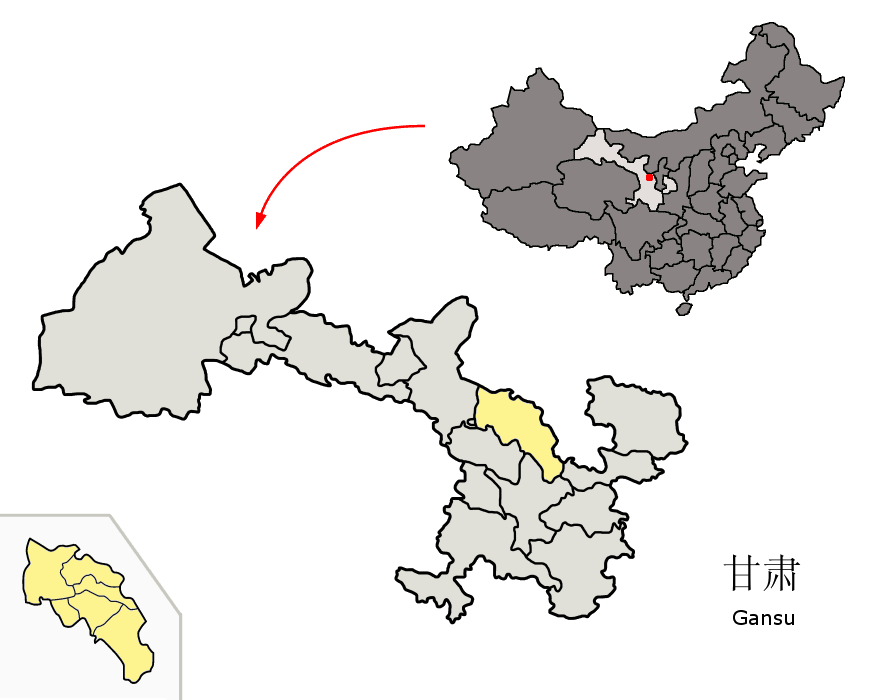
- Location of Baiyin Prefecture within Gansu

- Location of the city center in Gansu Location of the city in China
- Coordinates (Baiyin municipal government): 36°32′42″N 104°08′20″E
- Country: China
- Region: Gansu
- Municipal seat: Baiyin District

Area
  - Prefecture-level city: 20,100 km^{2} (7,800 sq mi)
  - Urban: 3,345 km^{2} (1,292 sq mi)
  - Metro: 3,345 km^{2} (1,292 sq mi)
- Elevation: 1,698 m (5,571 ft)

Population (2020 census)
  - Prefecture-level city: 1,512,110
  - Density: 75.2/km^{2} (195/sq mi)
  - Urban: 538,514
  - Urban density: 161.0/km^{2} (417.0/sq mi)
  - Metro: 538,514
  - Metro density: 161.0/km^{2} (417.0/sq mi)

GDP
  - Prefecture-level city: CN¥ 43.4 billion US$ 7.0 billion
  - Per capita: CN¥ 25,410; US$ 4,080
- Time zone: UTC+8 (CST)
- Postal code: 730900
- Area code: 0943
- ISO 3166 code: CN-GS-04
- Vehicle registration: 甘D
- Website: www.baiyin.cn

Baiyin (simplified Chinese: 白银; traditional Chinese: 白銀; pinyin: Báiyín; lit. 'White-Silver') is a prefecture-level city in northeastern Gansu province, People's Republic of China. Established in the 1950s as a base for mining non-ferrous metals, its mines are becoming exhausted in recent decades, requiring the city to reinvent its economy. Located around 60 km (37 mi) from Gansu's capital Lanzhou, it is part of the Lanzhou-Baiyin Economic Belt.

== Geography and climate ==
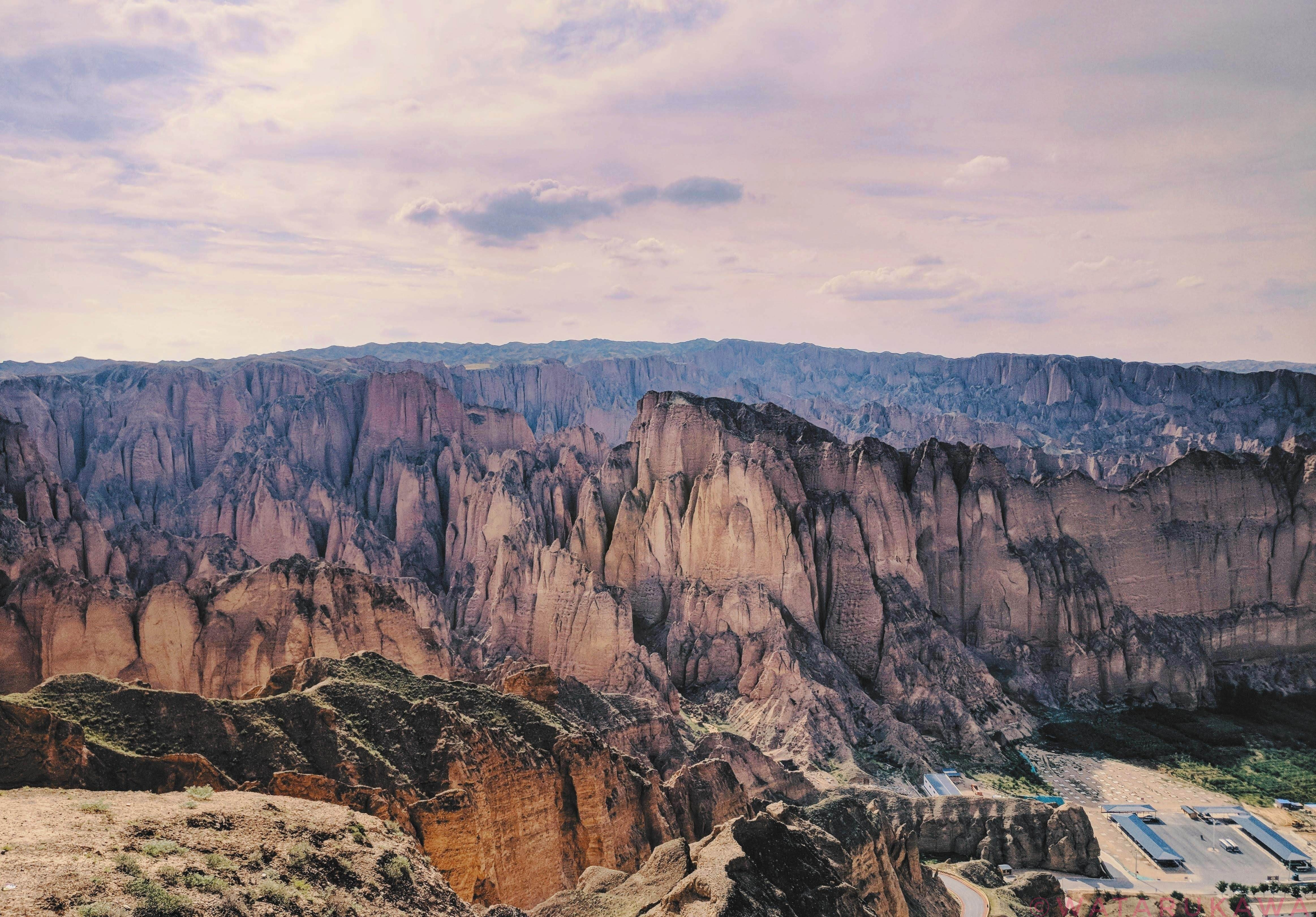
Yellow River Stone forest canyon

Baiyin is part loess plateau, part desert. Elevation ranges from 1,275 to 3,321 meters (4,183 to 10,896 feet) above sea-level. The prefecture-level city has either a cool arid climate (Köppen BWk) or a cool semi-arid climate (BSk) is very arid with only 110–352 mm (4.3–13.9 in) of annual precipitation. Annual evaporation is 2,101 mm (82.7 in) resulting in a net loss of approximately 1,800 mm (71 in). The Yellow River flows from south to north for 214 km (133 mi) through Baiyin.

The area is 20,100 km^{2} (7,800 sq mi), 3,345 km^{2} (1,292 sq mi) of that urban.

Climate data for Baiyin, elevation 1,737 m (5,699 ft), (1991–2020 normals, extremes 1981–2010)
Month	Jan	Feb	Mar	Apr	May	Jun	Jul	Aug	Sep	Oct	Nov	Dec	Year
Record high °C (°F)	11.8 (53.2)	18.8 (65.8)	26.3 (79.3)	32.8 (91.0)	33.5 (92.3)	34.5 (94.1)	39.1 (102.4)	35.7 (96.3)	32.7 (90.9)	26.5 (79.7)	18.9 (66.0)	14.2 (57.6)	39.1 (102.4)
Mean daily maximum °C (°F)	0.7 (33.3)	5.0 (41.0)	12.2 (54.0)	18.5 (65.3)	22.6 (72.7)	26.5 (79.7)	28.3 (82.9)	26.9 (80.4)	21.3 (70.3)	15.8 (60.4)	8.7 (47.7)	1.7 (35.1)	15.7 (60.2)
Daily mean °C (°F)	−6.0 (21.2)	−2.0 (28.4)	5.0 (41.0)	11.3 (52.3)	15.7 (60.3)	20.2 (68.4)	21.9 (71.4)	20.7 (69.3)	15.2 (59.4)	9.3 (48.7)	2.1 (35.8)	−5.1 (22.8)	9.0 (48.2)
Mean daily minimum °C (°F)	−10.9 (12.4)	−7.1 (19.2)	−0.6 (30.9)	5.0 (41.0)	9.5 (49.1)	14.3 (57.7)	16.2 (61.2)	15.5 (59.9)	10.6 (51.1)	4.5 (40.1)	−2.6 (27.3)	−9.8 (14.4)	3.7 (38.7)
Record low °C (°F)	−21.2 (−6.2)	−18.5 (−1.3)	−15.9 (3.4)	−7.5 (18.5)	−2.5 (27.5)	4.7 (40.5)	7.3 (45.1)	6.5 (43.7)	0.2 (32.4)	−11.1 (12.0)	−14.9 (5.2)	−22.1 (−7.8)	−22.1 (−7.8)
Average precipitation mm (inches)	1.7 (0.07)	1.3 (0.05)	3.7 (0.15)	9.1 (0.36)	22.3 (0.88)	30.7 (1.21)	48.4 (1.91)	45.4 (1.79)	31.6 (1.24)	14.0 (0.55)	1.7 (0.07)	0.5 (0.02)	210.4 (8.3)
Average precipitation days (≥ 0.1 mm)	2.4	1.6	2.7	4.3	6.8	8.6	10.2	9.7	9.6	6.0	1.7	1.0	64.6
Average snowy days	4.7	3.9	3.7	1.4	0.2	0	0	0	0	1.2	2.8	2.6	20.5
Average relative humidity (%)	51	45	41	39	42	47	55	59	63	59	53	52	51
Mean monthly sunshine hours	186.5	191.7	216.3	235.8	252.2	240.2	242.3	227.7	184.8	188.8	188.5	189.0	2,543.8
Percentage possible sunshine	60	62	58	59	57	55	55	55	50	55	62	63	58
Source: China Meteorological Administration

== Administration ==
Baiyin has 2 urban districts, 3 counties, 64 townships, 18 towns, and 7 sub-districts with a total population of 1,512,110 as of the 2020 Chinese census, of which 538,514 lived in the built-up (or metro) area made of the 2 urban districts of Baiyin and Pingchuan.

Map
Name	Simplified Chinese	Hanyu Pinyin	Population (2020)	Area (km^{2})	Density (/km^{2})
Baiyin District	白银区	Báiyín Qū	337,645	1,372	215
Pingchuan District	平川区	Píngchuān Qū	200,869	2,106	91
Jingyuan County	靖远县	Jìngyuǎn Xiàn	373,050	5,809	78
Huining County	会宁县	Huìníng Xiàn	401,581	6,439	84
Jingtai County	景泰县	Jǐngtài Xiàn	198,965	5,483	41

== Economy ==
The Baiyin Nonferrous Group operates copper, zinc and selenium mines around Baiyin, although these mines are getting exhausted of ore. Financed by development funds, a high-tech park is being built, which is home to a contact lens factory. Pingchuan District and Huining County are the largest coal production bases in Gansu province.

The Yinguang Group, a subsidiary of Norinco, operates a major factory making chemicals for defense and civilian use, the factory was a key project of the first five-year plan.

== Transportation ==
Baiyin is directly served by the Baotou–Lanzhou railway, Honghui railway, China National Highway 109, China National Highway 341 and G6 Beijing–Lhasa Expressway.

Baiyinnan (白银南站) Railway Station will be put into operation on 29 December 2022.

== Notable people ==
- Chen Hualan – veterinary virologist

== Demographics ==
According to the Seventh National Census in 2020, the city's Permanent Population (hukou) was 1,512,110. In the population, 50.98% were males and 49.02% were females. In the age structure, 18.9% were from 0 to 14 years old, 62.07% were from 15 to 59 years old, 19.03% were over 60 years old, and 13.96% were over 65 years old.
