= 2021 Maduo earthquake =

Earthquake in China

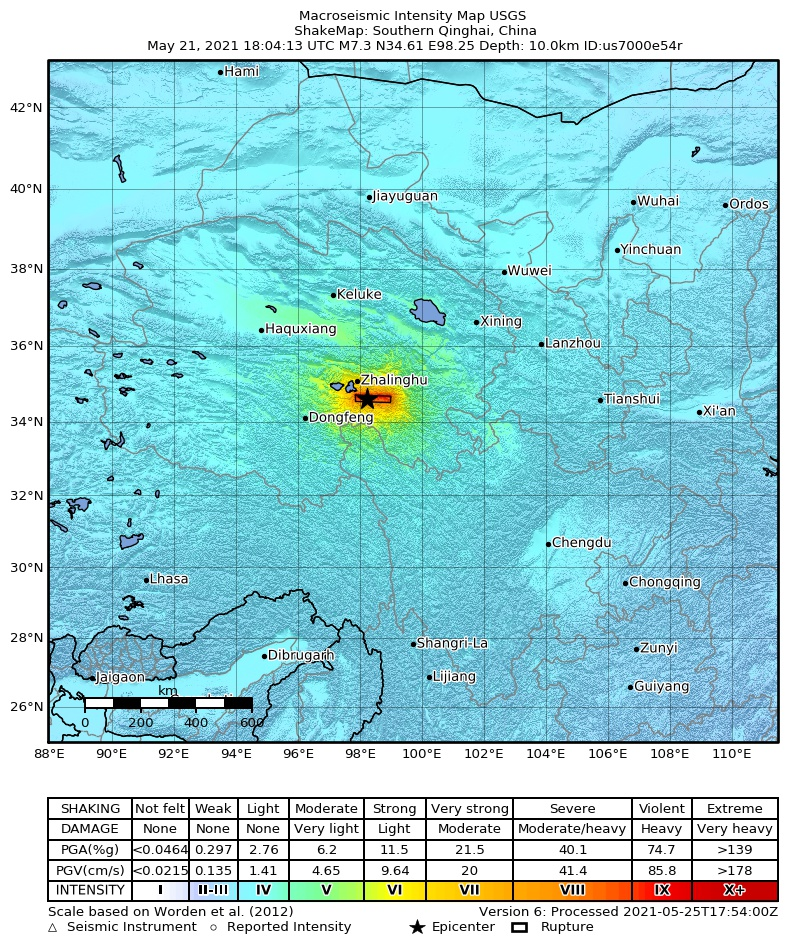
- USGS Shakemap

- Location within China Location within Qinghai
- UTC time: 2021-05-21 18:04:13
- ISC event: 620437814
- USGS-ANSS: ComCat
- Local date: 22 May 2021
- Local time: 02:04 (China Standard Time)
- Magnitude: 7.4 M_{w} 7.4 M_{s}
- Depth: 17 km (11 mi)
- Epicenter: 34.586°N 98.255°E
- Areas affected: Qinghai & Tibet, China
- Total damage: ¥4.1 billion ($646 million USD)
- Max. intensity: CSIS X MMI X (Extreme)
- Aftershocks: Multiple. Largest is an mb5.5
- Casualties: 19 injured (official); 20 dead, 300 injured, 13 missing (anonymous source)

The 2021 Maduo earthquake, also known as the 5.22 earthquake struck Madoi County in Qinghai Province, China, on 22 May at 02:04 local time. The earthquake had a moment magnitude and surface-wave magnitude of 7.4. Highway bridges, roads and walls collapsed as a result of the earthquake. According to an anonymous source, at least 20 people were killed, 300 were injured, and 13 were missing. Officials stated that there were no deaths but 19 people sustained minor injuries. It was the strongest in China since the 2008 Sichuan earthquake. It was assigned a maximum intensity of X in Machali, Maduo County on the China seismic intensity scale and Modified Mercalli intensity scale. This earthquake was preceded by another unrelated earthquake that occurred 5 hours earlier in Yunnan.

== Tectonic setting ==
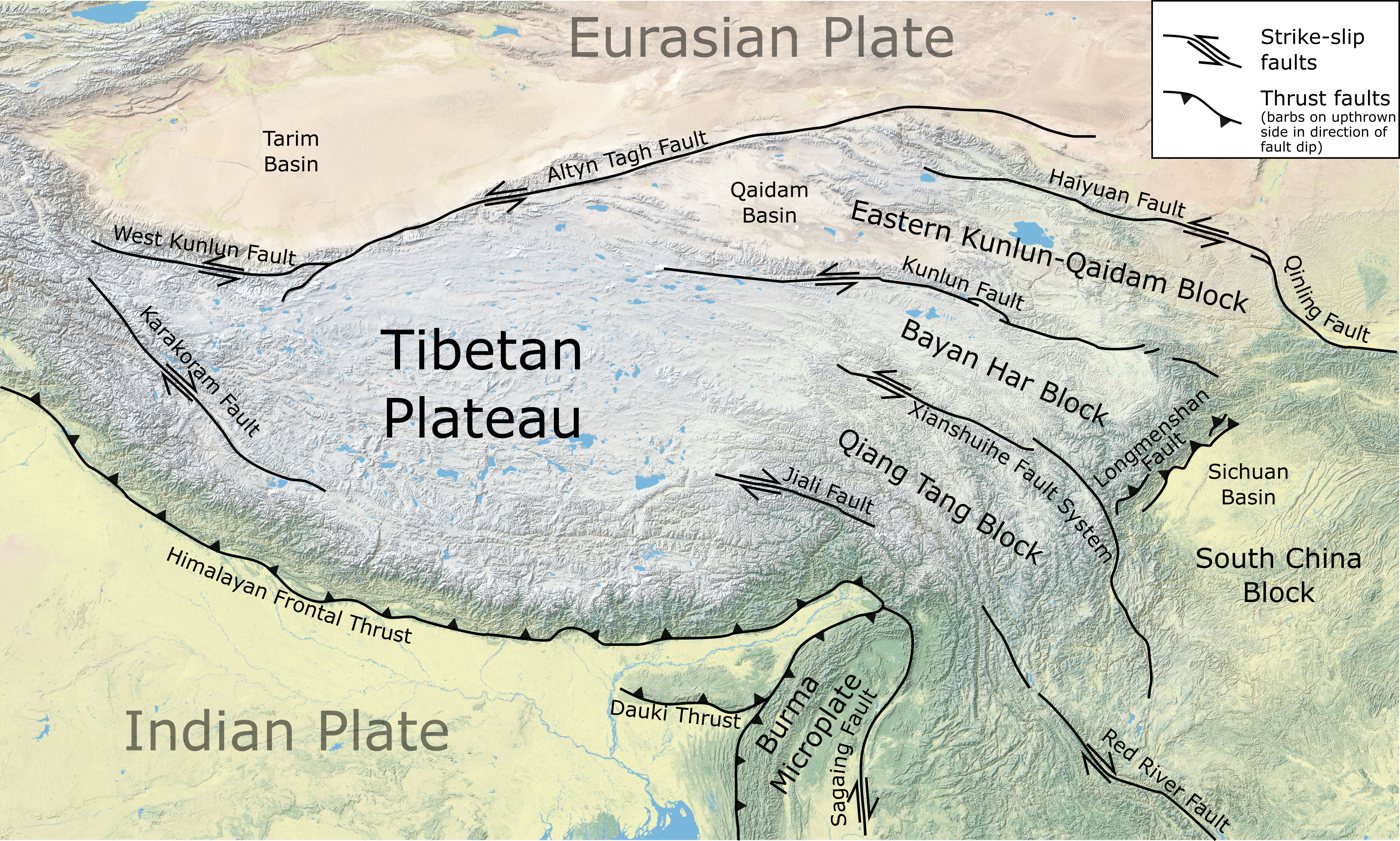
Map of the main fault zones and blocks of the Tibetan Plateau.

Western Sichuan is situated at the edge of the Tibetan Plateau in a vast zone of complex continental deformation caused by the collision of the Indian plate with the Eurasian plate. As the thrusting of the Indian plate beneath the Eurasian plate along the Himalayas continues, the continental crust within the Eurasian plate is actively uplifted and thickened, forming the Tibetan Plateau. As there are no active thrust structures within the plateau, compression is accommodated by strike-slip motion along large structures including the Altyn Tagh Fault, Kunlun Fault, Haiyuan Fault and Xianshuihe fault system. Left-lateral strike-slip motion squeezes the crustal blocks of the Tibetan Plateau outwards, forcing it to move eastwards. Meanwhile, the strike-slip motion also results in east–west extension of the plateau, causing normal faults to break within the thickened crust.

One of these blocks is the Bayan Har block; bounded to the east by the Longmenshan Fault, Kunlun Fault to the north, and Xianshuihe fault system in the south.

== Earthquake ==
According to the United States Geological Survey (USGS), the earthquake occurred as a result of dominantly left-lateral strike-slip faulting with a component of normal dip-slip. It had an estimated focal depth of 10–17 km. In a matter of days after the event, expert seismologists in China confirmed that the event occurred on the Kunlunshankou–Jiangcuo Fault; a left-lateral fault located within the Bayan Har block. This fault is located approximately 70–80 km south of the much larger Kunlun Fault.

Analysis of the USGS preliminary finite fault model of the slip distribution suggest the rupture was about 180 km long and the greatest slip was at 3.3 meters. A research paper soon to be published in Science Bulletin found that the largest surface displacements measured 2.4 meters, while the use of satellite imagery to model the earthquake rupture found a maximum slip of 6 meters near the hypocenter. In another earthquake model, up to 7 meters of coseismic slip occurred on the shallow 12 km of the rupture. Meanwhile, another study published in Geophysical Research Letters inferred a maximum slip of 9.3 meters at a depth of 7 km. Field analysis show the quake occurred on the Jiangcuo Fault. Parallel to the Jiangcuo Fault are the Maduo-Grande, South Gande, Dari, and Xizangdagou-Changmahe faults, which did not rupture. Based on inferring the locations of the aftershock zone, which extended for approximately 170 km, and the location of the mainshock epicenter, the event involved a bilateral rupture on the strike-slip fault. At the eastern and western termination of the earthquake rupture, a secondary segment also ruptured. The secondary rupture in the west measured longer than that of the east. Further analysis of the event by seismologists indicate it was a supershear earthquake.

=== Scientific reactions ===
Experts from the China Earthquake Networks Center (CENC) said that it is unlikely that another similar-sized earthquake would strike the same area again in the near future. They added that this earthquake likely occurred within the Bayan Har block, a piece of continental crust in the Tibetan Plateau. Its main boundaries are the Xianshuihe Fault to the south and the Kunlun Fault to the north. The largest earthquakes in the vicinity of the 22 May event are the 2001 Kunlun earthquake and the 1937 Tuosuo Lake earthquake, both measuring 7.8 on the moment magnitude scale and involving a rupture on the Kunlun Fault. The earthquake was unexpected and a surprise to seismologists who had previously thought the Bayan Har block was not capable of producing large earthquakes, and that its interior was tectonically stable.

=== Aftershocks ===
The magnitude 7.4 earthquake was followed by many aftershocks, the largest measuring up to 5.5 on the body wave magnitude (mb) scale. Two additional aftershocks measured 5.4 mb. The aftershocks were distributed along the entire length of the rupture.

Only aftershocks of magnitude 5.0 or greater are included in this table.

Time (UTC)	Latitude	Longitude	Magnitude (M_{w})	MMI	Source
2021-05-21 18:04:13	34.586°N	98.255°E	7.4	X	
2021-05-21 18:10:41	34.576°N	98.295°E	5.2	-	
2021-05-21 18:12:15	34.624°N	98.473°E	5.5	VII	
2021-05-21 18:13:01	34.482°N	99.084°E	5.4	VI	
2021-05-22 02:29:37	34.936°N	97.448°E	5.1	-	
2021-05-22 02:38:45	34.540°N	98.927°E	5.1	-	
2021-05-22 03:21:18	34.730°N	98.086°E	5.2	-	
2021-05-30 04:50:09	34.614°N	98.220°E	5.1	-	
2021-05-30 06:55:15	34.587°N	34.587°N	5.2	-	
2021-06-03 05:55:18	34.723°N	97.841°E	5.0	VI	
2021-07-08 13:23:25	34.676°N	97.917°E	5.1	-	
2021-08-13 04:21:37	34.598°N	97.428°E	5.4	VII	

=== Intensity ===
2021 Maduo earthquake seismic intensities
MSK 64	Locations	Felt area (km^{3})
CSIS X	Machali	69
CSIS IX	Machali, Huanghe Township, Dawu Town, Youyun Township, Maqên County	1,079
CSIS VIII	Tehetu Township, Huashixia, Gyaring Lake, Youyun Township	2,295
CSIS VII	Youyun Township, Dawu Township, Maqin County, Tehetu Township, Darlag County	10,650
CSIS VI	Dangluo Township, Tehetu Township, Jiangqian Township, Qingzhen Township, Xiagongma Township, Ganglong Township, Gadê County, Qumarlêb County, Yüxü, Qingshuihe Town, Dulan County, Qaidam, Sêrxü County	39,611

The Ministry of Emergency Management and the China Earthquake Administration conducted a field analysis of 55 affected areas to investigate the effects of the earthquake. The survey results were compiled to create an intensity map of the earthquake which was released on 28 May. According to the findings, 3 cities, prefectures, 7 counties, 32 townships in Qinghai Province, and 1 city, prefecture, 1 county, 4 townships in Sichuan Province were located within the seismic intensities VI–X on the China seismic intensity scale.

The meizoseismal area of the earthquake was in Machali, a town in Maduo County, Golog Tibetan Autonomous Prefecture. The earthquake has its maximum intensity of shaking felt in this region. It was assigned X on the China seismic intensity scale for an area of 69 km^{2}. Such level of intensity would result in bridge piers collapsing and surface fissuring. Intensity IX was felt in two separate areas for 1,069 km^{2} and 375 km^{2} respectively along the fault trace. Intensity VIII was felt for a larger 2,295 km^{2}. The earthquake was felt as far as Lanzhou, Xi'an and Chengdu.

== Impact ==
Official words from Chinese authorities stated that 30,000 residents were affected, no deaths occurred and 19 people from Maduo and Maqin counties were injured. Most residents sustained minor injuries, 17 of whom were discharged from the hospitals after receiving treatment. The relatively few number of casualties was attributed to the low population density of the area around the earthquake. On 1 June, according to an unidentified Tibetan source, there were 20 deaths, over 300 injured, and 13 missing. The source cited by Radio Free Asia stated that residents in Maduo County and Tibet were prohibited to spread any information of casualties. An estimated 32,000 or more people were displaced.

The earthquake caused damage to at least 625 homes and seven barns in the Huanghe Township area. In Zhalinghu Township, two homes and a barn collapsed due to the shock. Another barn was destroyed in Machali Town. In Huashixia Town, the earthquake collapsed 16 homes. Two parallel bridges of the G0613 Xining–Lijiang Expressway in Maduo County collapsed under the effects of the shock. The bridges were identified as the Yematan No. 2 Bridge of Yugong Expressway and Changma Bridge of Huajiu Expressway. Sections of other major highways were also seriously damaged and deformed beyond use. According to the Qinghai Provincial Transportation Department, the all roads and highways affected by the earthquake were temporarily closed and immediately attended to by repair workers.

Displaced residents relocated to three temporary residential settlements. Cotton tents were used as makeshift homes to those affected. Medical workers were also brought to the scene to assist. Some 186 boarding schoolchildren in Huanghe Township had to be moved to temporary shelters because of the tremors. Immediate repair works to communication services and power lines were also carried on. Checks were also conducted at nearby reservoirs and hydroelectric power stations for damage.

Many land fissures, landslides, and ground failures were reported around a zone greater than 100 km in length. Total destruction was observed to homes at Xuema, a small village located at the eastern terminus of the rupture where a small zone of the intensity was assigned IX. A 1.5-km-long surface fissure caused by liquefaction was reported near the village. Approximately 100 meters the north, a 1.5-km-long surface rupture was reported. Major damage was reported in brick structures. The collapse of a house buried two people while another two had minor injuries.

== See also ==
- List of earthquakes in 2021
- List of earthquakes in China
