= Supershear earthquake =

Earthquake in which the rupture propagation speeds are greater than the shear wave speed

In seismology, a supershear earthquake is when the propagation of the rupture along the fault surface occurs at speeds in excess of the seismic shear wave (S wave) velocity. This causes an effect analogous to a sonic boom.

== Rupture propagation velocity ==
During seismic events along a fault surface the displacement initiates at the focus and then propagates outwards. Typically for large earthquakes the focus lies towards one end of the slip surface and much of the propagation is unidirectional (e.g. the 2008 Sichuan and 2004 Indian Ocean earthquakes). Theoretical studies have in the past suggested that the upper bound for propagation velocity is that of Rayleigh waves, approximately 0.92 of the shear wave velocity. However, evidence of propagation at velocities between S wave and compressional wave (P wave) values have been reported for several earthquakes in agreement with theoretical and laboratory studies that support the possibility of rupture propagation in this velocity range. Systematic studies indicate that supershear rupture is common in large strike-slip earthquakes.

== Occurrence ==
Mode-I, Mode-II, and Mode-III cracks.

Evidence of rupture propagation at velocities greater than S wave velocities expected for the surrounding crust have been observed for several large earthquakes associated with strike-slip faults. During strike-slip, the main component of rupture propagation will be horizontal, in the direction of displacement, as a Mode II (in-plane) shear crack. This contrasts with a dip-slip rupture where the main direction of rupture propagation will be perpendicular to the displacement, like a Mode III (anti-plane) shear crack. Theoretical studies have shown that Mode III cracks are limited to the shear wave velocity but that Mode II cracks can propagate between the S and P wave velocities and this may explain why supershear earthquakes have not been observed on dip-slip faults.

== Initiation of supershear rupture ==
The rupture velocity range between those of Rayleigh waves and shear waves remains forbidden for a Mode II crack (a good approximation to a strike-slip rupture). This means that a rupture cannot accelerate from Rayleigh speed to shear wave speed. In the "Burridge–Andrews" mechanism, supershear rupture is initiated on a 'daughter' rupture in the zone of high shear stress developed at the propagating tip of the initial rupture. Because of this high stress zone, this daughter rupture is able to start propagating at supershear speed before combining with the existing rupture. Experimental shear crack rupture, using plates of a photoelastic material, has produced a transition from sub-Rayleigh to supershear rupture by a mechanism that "qualitatively conforms to the well-known Burridge-Andrews mechanism".

== Geological effects ==
The high rates of strain expected near faults that are affected by supershear propagation are thought to generate what is described as pulverized rocks. The pulverization involves the development of many small microcracks at a scale smaller than the grain size of the rock, while preserving the earlier fabric, quite distinct from the normal brecciation and cataclasis found in most fault zones. Such rocks have been reported up to 400 m away from large strike-slip faults, such as the San Andreas Fault. The link between supershear and the occurrence of pulverized rocks is supported by laboratory experiments that show very high strain rates are necessary to cause such intense fracturing.

== Examples ==
=== Directly observed ===
- 1999 Izmit earthquake, magnitude M_{w} 7.6 associated with strike-slip movement on the North Anatolian Fault Zone
- 1999 Düzce earthquake, magnitude M_{w} 7.2 associated with strike-slip movement on the North Anatolian Fault Zone
- 2001 Kunlun earthquake, magnitude M_{w} 7.8 associated with strike-slip movement on the Kunlun fault
- 2002 Denali earthquake, magnitude M_{w} 7.9 associated with strike-slip movement on the Denali Fault
- 2008 Sichuan earthquake, magnitude M_{w} 7.9, supershear was recognised during a sub-event on a strike-slip fault near the Longmenshan Fault
- 2010 Yushu earthquake, magnitude M_{w} 6.9 associated with strike-slip movement on the Yushu Fault
- 2012 Indian Ocean earthquakes, magnitude M_{w} 8.6 associated with strike-slip on several fault segments – the first supershear event recognised in oceanic lithosphere.
- 2013 Craig, Alaska earthquake, magnitude M_{w} 7.6 associated with strike-slip on the Queen Charlotte Fault – the first supershear event recognised on an oceanic plate boundary.
- 2013 Balochistan earthquake M_{w} 7.7 associated with strike-slip movement on a curved fault with supershear rupture speed.
- 2014 Aegean Sea earthquake, magnitude M_{w} 6.9, supershear was recognised during the second sub-event.
- 2015 Tajikistan earthquake, magnitude M_{w} 7.2, supershear slip on two segments, with normal slip at the restraining bend linking them.
- 2016 Romanche fracture zone earthquake, magnitude 7.1, westwards-directed supershear rupture following an initial easterly-travelling phase on the Romanche ocean transform fault in the equatorial Atlantic
- 2017 Komandorsky Islands earthquake, magnitude M_{w} 7.7, supershear transition followed a rupture jump across a fault stepover.
- 2018 Swan Islands earthquake, M_{w} 7.5 earthquake consisted of three sub-events with a compact rupture area and large cosesimic slip.
- 2018 Sulawesi earthquake, magnitude M_{w} 7.5, associated with strike-slip movement on the Palu-Koro Fault
- 2020 Caribbean Sea earthquake, magnitude M_{w} 7.7, unilateral rupture propagation westward from the epicenter along a 300 km section of the Oriente transform fault with two episodes of supershear rupture
- 2021 Maduo earthquake, M_{w} 7.4 earthquake in the Tibetan Plateau. This earthquake ruptured bilaterally for a length of 170 km within the Bayan Har block.
- 2023 Turkey–Syria earthquakes, M_{w} 7.8 and 7.6 earthquakes in Turkey. Supershear rupture initiated along both mainshocks, with the latter attaining a maximum velocity of 4.8 km (3.0 mi) per second.
- 2025 Myanmar earthquake, M_{w} 7.7 earthquake ruptured at supershear velocity along more than 460 km (290 mi) of the Sagaing Fault.
- 2026 Venezuela earthquakes, M_{w} 7.2 and M_{w} 7.5 doublet, with the rupture becoming supershear after jumping from the Boconó Fault to the San Sebastián fault.

=== Inferred ===
- 1906 San Francisco earthquake, magnitude M_{w} 7.8 associated with strike-slip movement on the San Andreas Fault
- 1979 Imperial Valley earthquake, magnitude M_{w} 6.4 associated with slip on the Imperial Fault
- 1990 Sakhalin earthquake, M_{w} 7.2 earthquake at over 600 km depth inferred to have ruptured at supershear speeds.
- 2013 Okhotsk Sea earthquake magnitude M_{w} 6.7 aftershock was an extremely deep (640 kilometers (400 miles)) supershear as well as unusually fast at "eight kilometers per second (five miles per second), nearly 50 percent faster than the shear wave velocity at that depth."

== See also ==
- Slow earthquake
