= Earthquake rupture =

Extent of slip in the Earth's crust that occurs during an earthquake

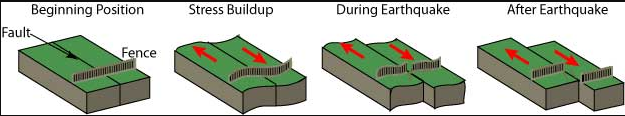
Figure 1. This cartoon shows what happens at the surface due to an earthquake rupture. Notice the progression of the strain that leads to the fault and amount of displacement.

In seismology, an earthquake rupture is the extent of slip that occurs during an earthquake in the Earth's crust. Earthquakes occur for many reasons that include: landslides, movement of magma in a volcano, the formation of a new fault, or, most commonly of all, a slip on an existing fault.

== Nucleation ==
A tectonic earthquake begins by an initial rupture at a point on the fault surface, a process known as nucleation. The scale of the nucleation zone is uncertain, with some evidence, such as the rupture dimensions of the smallest earthquakes, suggesting that it is smaller than 100 m while other evidence, such as a slow component revealed by low-frequency spectra of some earthquakes, suggest that it is larger. The possibility that the nucleation involves some sort of preparation process is supported by the observation that about 40% of earthquakes are preceded by foreshocks. Some large earthquakes however, such as the M8.6 1950 India – China earthquake, have no foreshocks and it remains unclear whether they just cause stress changes or are simply a result of increasing stresses in the region of the mainshock.

Once the rupture has initiated, it begins to propagate along the fault surface. The mechanics of this process are poorly understood, partly because it is difficult to recreate the high sliding velocities in a laboratory. Also the effects of strong ground motion make it very difficult to record information close to a nucleation zone.

== Propagation ==
Following nucleation, the rupture propagates away from the hypocentre in all directions along the fault surface. The propagation will continue as long as there is sufficient stored strain energy to create new rupture surface. Although the rupture starts to propagate in all directions, it often becomes unidirectional, with most of the propagation in a mainly horizontal direction. Depending on the depth of the hypocentre, the size of the earthquake and whether the fault extends that far, the rupture may reach the ground surface, forming a surface rupture. The rupture will also propagate down the fault plane, in many cases reaching the base of the seismogenic layer, below which the deformation starts to become more ductile in nature.

Propagation may take place on a single fault, but in many cases the rupture starts on one fault before jumping to another, sometimes repeatedly. The 2002 Denali earthquake initiated on a thrust fault, the Sutsina Glacier Thrust, before jumping onto the Denali Fault for most of its propagation before finally jumping again onto the Totschunda Fault. The rupture of the 2016 Kaikoura earthquake was particularly complex, with surface rupture observed on at least 21 separate faults.

== Termination ==
Some ruptures simply run out of sufficient stored energy, preventing further propagation. This may either be the result of stress relaxation due to an earlier earthquake on another part of the fault or because the next segment moves by aseismic creep, such that the stress never builds sufficiently to support rupture propagation. In other cases there is strong evidence for persistent barriers to propagation, giving an upper limit to earthquake magnitude. Rupture length correlates with earthquake magnitude and varies from an order of magnitude of kilometers in the single digits for a magnitude 5–6 earthquake up to hundreds of kilometers for stronger earthquakes (magnitude 7–9), although the correlation is not exact and outliers exist.

== Velocity ==
Most ruptures propagate at speeds in the range of 0.5–0.7 of the shear wave velocity, with only a minority of ruptures propagating significantly faster or slower than that.

The upper limit to normal propagation is the velocity of Rayleigh waves, 0.92 of the shear wave velocity, typically about 3.5 km per second. Observations from some earthquakes indicate that ruptures can propagate at speeds between the S wave and P wave velocity. These supershear earthquakes are all associated with strike-slip movement. The rupture cannot accelerate through the Rayleigh wave limit, so the accepted mechanism is that supershear rupture begins on a separate "daughter" rupture in the zone of high stress at the tip of the propagating main rupture. All observed examples show evidence of a transition to supershear at the point where the rupture jumps from one fault segment to another.

Slower than normal rupture propagation is associated with the presence of relatively mechanically weak material in the fault zone. This is particularly the case for some megathrust earthquakes, where the rupture velocity is about 1.0 km per second. These tsunami earthquakes are dangerous because most of the energy release happens at lower frequencies than normal earthquakes and they lack the peaks of seismic wave activity that would alert coastal populations to a possible tsunami risk. Typically the surface-wave magnitude for such an event is much smaller than moment magnitude as the former does not capture the longer wavelength energy release. The 1896 Sanriku earthquake went almost unnoticed, but the associated tsunami killed more than 22,000 people.

Extremely slow ruptures take place on a time scale of hours to weeks, giving rise to slow earthquakes. These very slow ruptures occur deeper than the locked zone where normal earthquake ruptures occur on the same megathrusts.

== See also ==
- Asperity (faults)
- Earthquake duration magnitude
- Earthquake magnitude
- Epicentral distance
