= Zhaxiqoilang Monastery =

Zhaxiqoilang Monastery is a Tibetan Buddhist monastery of the Jonang sect in the Golog Tibetan Autonomous Prefecture of Qinghai province, China. It is located on the Xike Qu River in east Gande County. The monastery has a monk population of 64 with one adobe sutra hall.
