= Lajia, Qinghai =

Ra'gya 拉加镇 · རྭ་རྒྱ་གྲོང་བརྡལ། Lajia
- Town
- Location in Qinghai
- Coordinates: 34°40′47″N 100°38′26″E
- Country: China
- Province: Qinghai
- Autonomous prefecture: Golog
- County: Maqên

Area
  - Total: 2,593 km^{2} (1,001 sq mi)

Population (2010)
  - Total: 12,045
  - Density: 4.645/km^{2} (12.03/sq mi)
- Time zone: UTC+8 (China Standard)
- Local dialing code: 975

Ra'gya or Lajia (Tibetan: རྭ་རྒྱ་གྲོང་བརྡལ།, Chinese: 拉加镇) is a town in Maqên County, Golog Tibetan Autonomous Prefecture, Qinghai, China. In 2010, Ra'gya had a total population of 12,045 people: 6,405 males and 5,640 females: 3,502 under 14 years old, 7,920 aged between 15 and 64 and 623 over 65 years old.
