= Barry Arm landslide =

Landslide in Alaska

- Barry Arm (Alaska)
- Location: Prince William Sound, Alaska, United States
- Type: Landslide

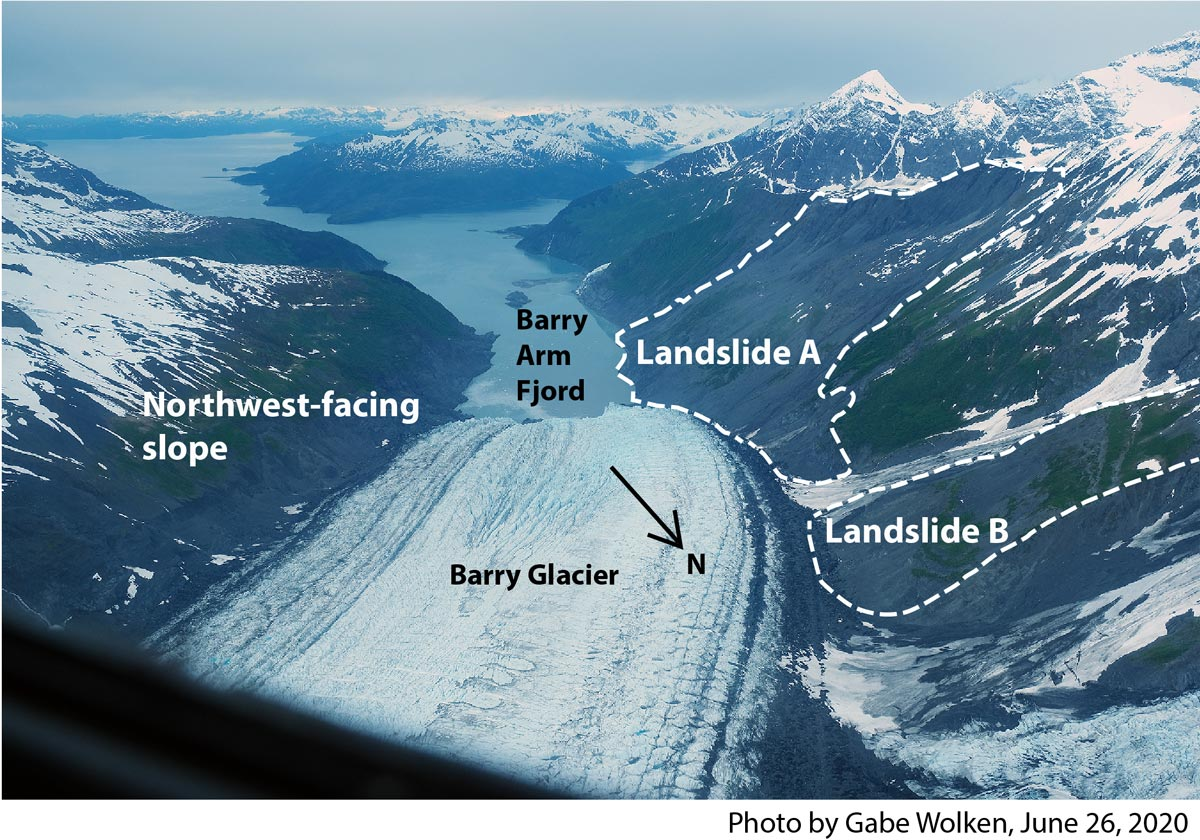
An annotated image showing the Barry Arm landslide

The Barry Arm landslide is an ongoing landslide in the Barry Arm fjord, northeast of Whittier, Alaska. The landslide is currently sliding into the waters of the fjord. Recently discovered in 2020, scientists fear that the slope may trigger a large tsunami when it falls into the fjord.

== Description ==
The Barry Arm landslide measures about 650,000,000 yd^{3} (500,000,000 m^{3}). It existed as far back as in the 1920s based on photographic evidence. From May 2010 to September 2013, during the retreat of Barry Glacier, the landslide moved at 85 ± 9 ft (25.9 ± 2.7 m) per year. The rate decreased to 4.25 ± 2.3 ft (1.30 ± 0.70 m) per year in March 2017 when the recession stopped.

Satellite data and imagery indicate the large part of the landslide directly above the fjord waters began sliding on August 23, 2022. The slide is currently moving at a rate of 1.6–2.7 in (41–69 mm) each day. However, the volume of the landslide remains undetermined because the depth is uncertain. Similar movement were recorded since 2008 and 2020. However, the recent movement is at least twice as fast and occurring over a greater area. The landslide consists of four parts (north to south: Tail, Core, Prow, Kite). In September 2022, movement was detected in large parts of "Core" and "Prow" as well as the entire "Kite" section.

== Tsunami hazard ==
The persistent movement of the landslide at a constant or increased rate would raise the likelihood for failure. In a worst-case scenario, rapid ground failure could result in a deadly tsunami in large water bodies including Harriman Fiord, Barry Arm, College Fiord, Port Wells, Cochrane Bay, Blackstone Bay, and Passage Canal. A tsunami measuring 30 ft (9.1 m) may strike the town of Whittier, 30 mi (48 km) southwest of the landslide. Scientists said that the tsunami could be fatal to people in the vicinity of the landslide.

According to an interdisciplinary team of researchers in 2020, if the landslide were to fail all at once, a peak run-up of 300 m (980 ft) would occur. Meanwhile run-ups of 30 m (98 ft) would be widely observed around the immediate area. The tsunami would propagate at 24–40 m (79–131 ft) per second across the Prince William Sound, posing a threat to small kayaks and large cruise vessels. Turbidity currents may be triggered by the landslide or tsunami, potentially damaging two submarine cables in the sound. Remaining oil in sediments from the Exxon Valdez oil spill could be remobilized and impact the natural environment. A 10-meter (33 ft) tsunami would strike Whittier within 20 minutes of the landslide occurring. The predicted tsunami heights are similar to that of the tsunami from the 1964 Alaska earthquake when it struck the city.

The following year, a report by the U.S. Geological Survey reassessed the tsunami threat posed by the landslide and said that the tsunami 500 m (1,600 ft) offshore Whittier may be slightly over 2 ft (0.61 m) in a worst-case scenario. In this separate scenario, the tsunami would exceed 200 m (660 ft) in the northern part of the fjord. In the southern fjord and at Harriman Fjord, the tsunami waves could be more than 5 m (16 ft). The simulation used data from bathymetric maps by the National Oceanic and Atmospheric Administration and lidar imaging from the Alaska Division of Geological and Geophysical Surveys. The U.S. Geological Survey said that the tsunami hazard is not as severe as initially thought but still pose a threat to coastal settlements.
