= Gyümai =

Gyümai 吉迈镇 · རྒྱུ་སྨད་གྲོང་རྡལ། Jimai
- Town
- Location of the city centre in Qinghai
- Coordinates: 33.756°N 99.650°E
- Country: China
- Province: Qinghai
- Autonomous prefecture: Golog
- County: Darlag

Area
  - Total: 926.8 km^{2} (357.8 sq mi)
- Elevation: 3,970 m (13,020 ft)

Population (2011)
  - Total: 8,144
  - Density: 8.787/km^{2} (22.76/sq mi)
- Time zone: UTC+8 (China Standard)

Gyümai (Tibetan: རྒྱུ་སྨད་, Chinese: 吉迈; pinyin: Jímài) is a town in Darlag County, Qinghai, China. The seat of Darlag County is situated in the Town of Gyümai. Gyümai has an altitude of 3,970 m (13,020 ft). The average annual temperature is −1.2 °C (29.8 °F), and the average annual precipitation is 531.5 mm (20.93 in).

Gyümai has a population of about 8,700. Most people live on the south side of the Yellow River. The King Gesar's Lion and Dragon Palace (格萨尔大王狮龙宫殿), rebuilt according to legends, is located at about 18 km (11 mi) away from Gyümai.
