= Dongqinggou Township, Qinghai =

Domkog Township 东倾沟乡 · སྡོམ་ཁོག་ཡུལ་ཚོ། Dongqinggou
- Township
- Location in Qinghai
- Coordinates: 34°31′18″N 99°58′21″E
- Country: China
- Province: Qinghai
- Autonomous prefecture: Golog
- County: Maqên

Area
  - Total: 821.5 km^{2} (317.2 sq mi)

Population (2010)
  - Total: 2,172
  - Density: 2.644/km^{2} (6.848/sq mi)
- Time zone: UTC+8 (China Standard)
- Local dialing code: 975

Domkog Township or Dongqinggou Township (Tibetan: སྡོམ་ཁོག་ཡུལ་ཚོ།, Chinese: 东倾沟乡) is a township in Maqên County, Golog Tibetan Autonomous Prefecture, Qinghai, China. In 2010, Domkog Township had a total population of 2,172: 1,124 males and 1,048 females: 677 aged under 14, 1,374 aged between 15 and 65 and 121 aged over 65.
