= Xiazangke Township, Qinghai =

Zangxoima Township 下藏科乡 · གཙང་ཞོལ་མ་ཡུལ་ཚོ། Xiazangke
- Township
- Location in Qinghai
- Coordinates: 34°4′25″N 100°41′44″E
- Country: China
- Province: Qinghai
- Autonomous prefecture: Golog
- County: Gadê

Area
  - Total: 615.9 km^{2} (237.8 sq mi)

Population (2010)
  - Total: 5,132
  - Density: 8.333/km^{2} (21.58/sq mi)
- Time zone: UTC+8 (China Standard)
- Local dialing code: 975

Zangxoima Township or Xiazangke Township (Tibetan: གཙང་ཞོལ་མ་ཡུལ་ཚོ།, Chinese: 下藏科乡) is a township in Gadê County, Golog Tibetan Autonomous Prefecture, Qinghai, China. In 2010, Zangxoima Township had a total population of 5,132 people: 2,744 males and 2,388 females: 1,679 under 14 years old, 3,220 aged between 15 and 64 and 233 over 65 years old.
