= Xueshan Township, Qinghai =

Kangri Township 雪山乡 · གངས་རི་ཡུལ་ཚོ། Xueshan
- Township
- Location in Qinghai
- Coordinates: 34°47′33″N 99°43′45″E
- Country: China
- Province: Qinghai
- Autonomous prefecture: Golog
- County: Maqên

Area
  - Total: 1,413 km^{2} (546 sq mi)

Population (2010)
  - Total: 1,850
  - Density: 1.31/km^{2} (3.39/sq mi)
- Time zone: UTC+8 (China Standard)
- Local dialing code: 975

Kangri Township or Xueshan Township (Tibetan: གངས་རི་ཡུལ་ཚོ།, Chinese: 雪山乡) is a township in Maqên County, Golog Tibetan Autonomous Prefecture, Qinghai, China. In 2010, Kangri Township had a total population of 1,850 people: 916 males and 934 females: 593 under 14 years old, 1,160 aged between 15 and 64 and 97 over 65 years old.
