= Xiaduwu Township, Qinghai =

Township in Qinghai, Tibet, China

Damai Township 下大武乡 · རྟ་སྨད་ཡུལ་ཚོ། Xiadawu
- Township
- Xiaduwuxiang
- Location in Qinghai
- Coordinates: 35°0′4″N 99°15′42″E
- Country: China
- Province: Qinghai
- Autonomous prefecture: Golog
- County: Maqên

Area
  - Total: 1,831 km^{2} (707 sq mi)

Population (2010)
  - Total: 1,663
  - Density: 0.9082/km^{2} (2.352/sq mi)
- Time zone: UTC+8 (China Standard)
- Local dialing code: 975

Damai Township or Xiadawu Township (Tibetan: རྟ་སྨད་ཡུལ་ཚོ།, Chinese: 下大武乡) is a township in Maqên County, Golog Tibetan Autonomous Prefecture, Qinghai, China. In 2010, Damai Township had a total population of 1,663 people: 856 males and 807 females: 433 under 14 years old, 1,121 aged between 15 and 64 and 109 over 65 years old.
