= Xiagongma Township, Qinghai =

Xiagongma Township 下贡麻乡
- Township
- Xiagongmaxiang
- Location in Qinghai
- Coordinates: 33°50′50″N 100°7′7″E
- Country: People's Republic of China
- Province: Qinghai
- Autonomous prefecture: Golog Tibetan Autonomous Prefecture
- County: Gadê County

Area
  - Total: 601.4 km^{2} (232.2 sq mi)

Population (2010)
  - Total: 4,084
  - Density: 6.791/km^{2} (17.59/sq mi)
- Time zone: UTC+8 (China Standard)
- Local dialing code: 975

Xiagongma Township (Mandarin: 下贡麻乡) is a township in Gadê County, Golog Tibetan Autonomous Prefecture, Qinghai, China. In 2010, Xiagongma Township had a total population of 4,084: 2,241 males and 1,843 females: 1,112 aged under 14, 2,718 aged between 15 and 65 and 254 aged over 65.
