= Ganglong Township, Qinghai =

Ganglong Township 岗龙乡
- Township
- Ganglongxiang
- Location in Qinghai
- Coordinates: 33°45′21″N 100°15′31″E
- Country: People's Republic of China
- Province: Qinghai
- Autonomous prefecture: Golog Tibetan Autonomous Prefecture
- County: Gadê County

Area
  - Total: 601.4 km^{2} (232.2 sq mi)

Population (2010)
  - Total: 4,084
  - Density: 6.791/km^{2} (17.59/sq mi)
- Time zone: UTC+8 (China Standard)
- Local dialing code: 975

Ganglong Township (Mandarin: 岗龙乡) is a township in Gadê County, Golog Tibetan Autonomous Prefecture, Qinghai, China. In 2010, Ganglong Township had a total population of 4,084: 2,241 males and 1,843 females: 1,112 aged under 14, 2,718 aged between 15 and 65 and 254 aged over 65.
