= Tehetu Township, Qinghai =

Dagtog Township 特合土乡 · སྟག་ཐོག་ཡུལ་ཚོ། Tehetu
- Township
- Location in Qinghai
- Coordinates: 33°53′35″N 99°8′9″E
- Country: China
- Province: Qinghai
- Autonomous prefecture: Golog
- County: Darlag

Area
  - Total: 2,176 km^{2} (840 sq mi)

Population (2010)
  - Total: 1,600
  - Density: 0.74/km^{2} (1.9/sq mi)
- Time zone: UTC+8 (China Standard)
- Local dialing code: 973

Dagtog Township or Tehetu Township (Tibetan: སྟག་ཐོག་ཡུལ་ཚོ།, Chinese: 特合土乡) is a township in Darlag County, Golog Tibetan Autonomous Prefecture, Qinghai, China. In 2010, Dagtog Township had a total population of 1,600: 831 males and 769 females: 549 aged under 14, 991 aged between 15 and 65 and 60 aged over 65.
