= Dangluo Township, Qinghai =

Tanglag Township 当洛乡 · དྭངས་ལག་ཡུལ་ཚོ། Dangluo
- Township
- Location in Qinghai
- Coordinates: 33°59′50″N 99°27′9″E
- Country: China
- Province: Qinghai
- Autonomous prefecture: Golog
- County: Maqên

Area
  - Total: 1,422 km^{2} (549 sq mi)

Population (2010)
  - Total: 3,890
  - Density: 2.74/km^{2} (7.09/sq mi)
- Time zone: UTC+8 (China Standard)
- Local dialing code: 975

Tanglag Township or Dangluo Township (Tibetan: དྭངས་ལག་ཡུལ་ཚོ།, Chinese: 当洛乡) is a township in Maqên County, Golog Tibetan Autonomous Prefecture, Qinghai, China. In 2010, Tanglag Township had a total population of 3,890: 2,030 males and 1,860 females: 1,297 aged under 14, 2,379 aged between 15 and 65 and 214 aged over 65.
