= Bayan Har block =

Part of the Tibetan Plateau

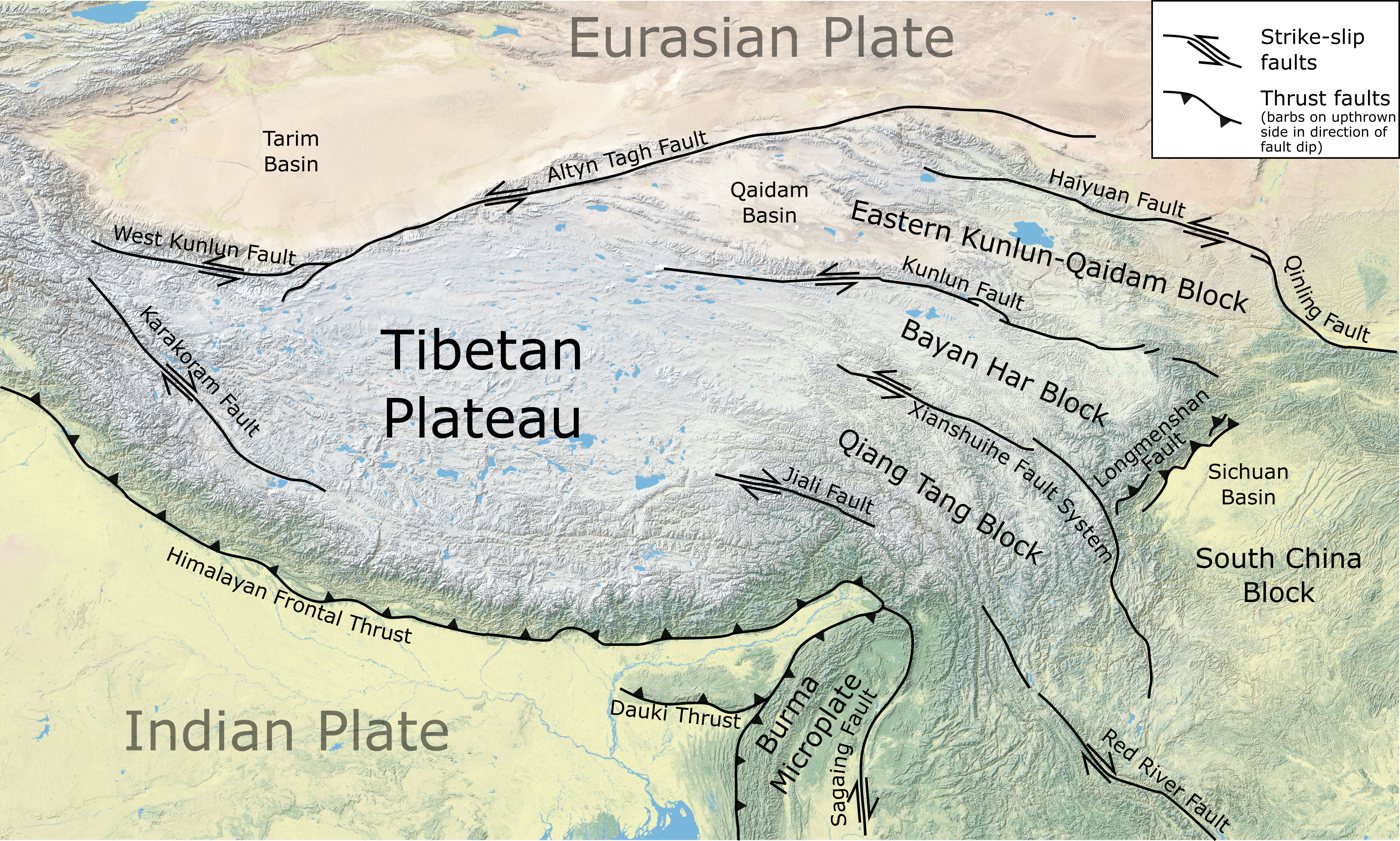
Tectonic map of the Tibetan Plateau showing the main structures

The Bayan Har block or Bayan Kola block is an elongate wedge-shaped block that forms part of the eastern Tibetan Plateau. It is bounded to the southeast by the Longmenshan Fault, a major thrust fault zone, which forms the active tectonic boundary between the plateau and the Sichuan Basin. To the northeast, the boundary is formed by the Kunlun and Minjiang Faults juxtaposing the block against the Eastern Kunlun-Qaidam block and to the southwest by the Xianshuihe fault system forms its boundary with the Qiangtang block. All of these are major left-lateral strike-slip fault zones. The block is currently moving to the southeast relative to the South China block.

== Internal deformation ==
The southeastern part of the block, known as the Longmenshan sub-block, accommodates a significant part of its eastward motion. The northwestern boundary of this sub-block is formed by the parallel Longriba and Maoergai faults, with the former showing evidence of mainly thrusting to the southeast and the latter showing a significant component of right lateral strike-slip. The NW-SE shortening within the sub-block is caused by the resistance offered by the stronger lithosphere of the South China Block, which has led to a backwards propagating thrust system. The area between the Longriba and Longmenshan faults has a current uplift rate of 1.5 mm per year. This model is consistent with observations of increased slip rates on the more southeasterly parts of the Xianshuihe fault system.

== Seismicity ==
Earthquakes are mainly concentrated on the faults bounding the block, such as the 2001 Kunlun earthquake (on the Kunlun Fault), the 2008 Sichuan earthquake (on the Longmenshan Fault) and the 1973 Luhuo earthquake, 1981 Dawu earthquake and 2010 Yushu earthquake (all on the Xianshuihe fault system). In May 2021, the block hosted the Maduo earthquake; upon further analysis, found that the intraplate earthquake occurred on a fault within the block.
