= Youyun Township, Qinghai =

Yigxung Township 优云乡 · དབྱིག་གཞུང་ཡུལ་ཚོ། Youyun
- Township
- Location in Qinghai
- Coordinates: 34°16′15″N 99°11′40″E
- Country: China
- Province: Qinghai
- Autonomous prefecture: Golog
- County: Maqên

Area
  - Total: 2,854 km^{2} (1,102 sq mi)

Population (2010)
  - Total: 2,865
  - Density: 1.004/km^{2} (2.600/sq mi)
- Time zone: UTC+8 (China Standard)
- Local dialing code: 973

Yigxung Township or Youyun Township (Tibetan: དབྱིག་གཞུང་ཡུལ་ཚོ།, Chinese: 优云乡) is a township in Maqên County, Golog Tibetan Autonomous Prefecture, Qinghai, China. In 2010, Yigxung Township had a total population of 2,865: 1,494 males and 1,371 females: 856 aged under 14, 1,847 aged between 15 and 65 and 162 aged over 65.
