= Qingzhen Township, Qinghai =

Kyinzhi Township 青珍乡 · ཁྱི་འབྲི་ཡུལ་ཚོ། Qingzhen
- Township
- Location in Qinghai
- Coordinates: 34°8′54″N 100°11′42″E
- Country: China
- Province: Qinghai
- Autonomous prefecture: Golog
- County: Gadê

Area
  - Total: 1,480 km^{2} (570 sq mi)

Population (2010)
  - Total: 5,704
  - Density: 3.85/km^{2} (9.98/sq mi)
- Time zone: UTC+8 (China Standard)
- Local dialing code: 975

Kyinzhi Township or Qingzhen Township (Tibetan: ཁྱི་འབྲི་ཡུལ་ཚོ།, Chinese: 青珍乡) is a township in Gadê County, Golog Tibetan Autonomous Prefecture, Qinghai, China. In 2010, Kyinzhi Township had a total population of 5,704: 2,928 males and 2,776 females: 1,863 aged under 14, 3,592 aged between 15 and 65 and 249 aged over 65.
