= Jiangqian Township, Qinghai =

Gyangqai Township 江千乡 · རྒྱང་ཆད་ཡུལ་ཚོ། Jiangqian
- Township
- Jiangqianxiang
- Location in Qinghai
- Coordinates: 34°9′16″N 100°26′44″E
- Country: China
- Province: Qinghai
- Autonomous prefecture: Golog
- County: Gadê

Area
  - Total: 783.8 km^{2} (302.6 sq mi)

Population (2010)
  - Total: 3,462
  - Density: 4.417/km^{2} (11.44/sq mi)
- Time zone: UTC+8 (China Standard)
- Local dialing code: 975

Gyangqai Township or Jiangqian Township (Tibetan: རྒྱང་ཆད་ཡུལ་ཚོ།, Chinese: 江千乡) is a township in Gadê County, Golog Tibetan Autonomous Prefecture, Qinghai, China. In 2010, Gyangqai Township had a total population of 3,462 people: 1,702 males and 1,760 females: 951 under 14 years old, 2,328 aged between 15 and 64 and 183 over 65 years old.
