= Totschunda Fault =

The Totschunda Fault is a major active dextral (right-lateral) continental strike-slip fault in southeastern Alaska. It forms a link between the Denali Fault to the northwest and the Fairweather Fault to the southeast. The northwestern end of the fault ruptured during the 2002 Denali earthquake.

Based on radiometric dating of a dike that cuts fault rock associated with the Totschunda Fault to about 114 million years ago, the fault zone was initiated during the latter part of the Early Cretaceous, associated with the accretion of the Wrangellia Terrane.
