= 2002 Denali earthquake =

7.9 magnitude; November 3, 2002

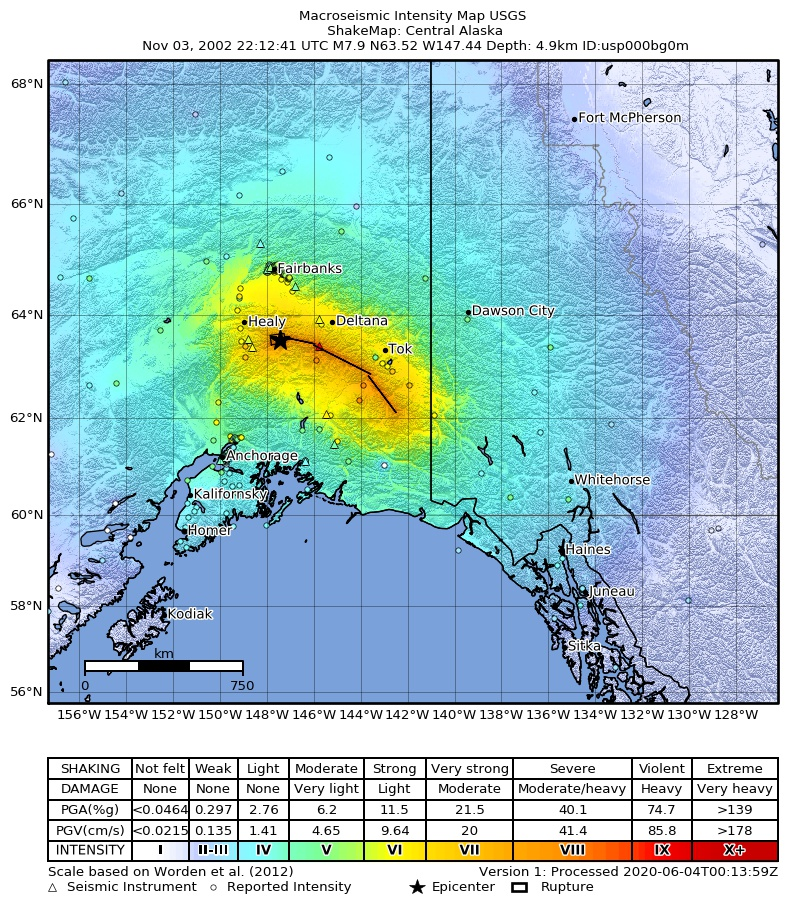

- Location within Alaska
- UTC time: 2002-11-03 22:12:41
- ISC event: 6123395
- USGS-ANSS: ComCat
- Local date: November 3, 2002
- Local time: 13:12
- Magnitude: 7.9 M_{w}
- Depth: 4.2 km (3 mi)
- Epicenter: 63.51°N 147.6°W
- Fault: Denali Fault, Totschunda Fault
- Type: Strike-slip
- Total damage: $20–56 million
- Max. intensity: MMI IX (Violent)
- Casualties: One injured

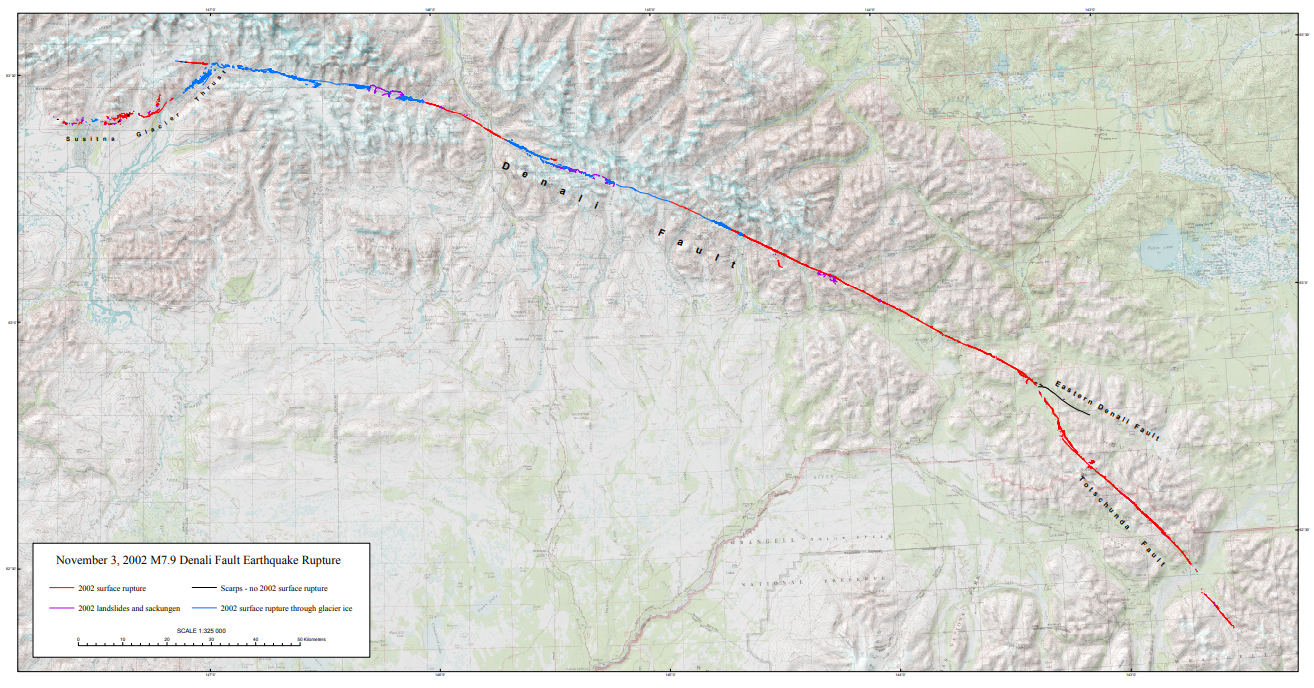
Extent of surface rupture caused by faulting during the 2002 Denali earthquake

The 2002 Denali earthquake occurred at 22:12:41 UTC (1:12 PM Local Time) November 3 with an epicenter 66 km ESE of Denali National Park, Alaska, United States. This 7.9 M_{w} earthquake was the largest recorded in the United States in 37 years (after the 1965 Rat Islands earthquake). The shock was the strongest ever recorded in the interior of Alaska. Due to the remote location, there were no fatalities and only one injury.

Due to the shallow depth, it was felt at least as far away as Seattle and it generated seiches on bodies of water as far away as Texas and New Orleans, Louisiana. About 20 houseboats were damaged by a seiche on a lake in Washington State.

== Tectonic setting ==
The Denali-Totschunda fault is a major dextral (right lateral) strike-slip system, similar in scale to the San Andreas Fault system. In Alaska, moving from east to west, the plate interactions change from a transform boundary between the Pacific plate and North American plate to a collision zone with a microplate, the Yakutat terrane, which is in the process of being accreted to the North American plate, to a destructive boundary along the line of the Aleutian Islands. The Denali-Totschunda fault system is one of the structures that accommodate the accretion of the Yakutat terrane.

== Earthquake ==
=== Foreshock ===
On October 23, 2002, there was a magnitude 6.7 earthquake located on the Denali fault. The event's aftershocks revealed a 45 km (28 mi) long fault rupture along the Denali fault, but aerial reconnaissance could not locate a surface rupture. This rupture extends to 10 km (6.2 mi) west of the mainshock's epicenter. Minor avalanches of snow and rockfalls were plentiful in the area as a result. Because of its location close to the November 3 event and the fact that it preceded it by only 11 days, this earthquake is regarded as a foreshock. The calculated stress transfer from this foreshock indicates that it brought the Denali fault closer to failure at the location of the mainshock epicenter.

=== Mainshock ===
The initial rupture on November 3, nucleating 22 km (14 mi) east of the foreshock, was on a thrust fault segment, the previously unknown Susitna Glacier thrust, to the south of the Denali fault. The rupture then jumped to the main Denali Fault strand propagating for a further 218 km (135 mi) before jumping again onto the Totschunda Fault through a wide and complex transition zone, and then ruptured another 70 km (43 mi) of fault plane. The total surface rupture was ca. 340 km (211 mi).

Slip on the Susitna Glacier thrust peaked at 4 m (13 ft) with an average displacement of 1.4 m (4 ft 7 in) across the fault. Slip on the Denali fault peaked at 8.8 m (29 ft) with an average slip of 5.3 m (17 ft). The transition zone between the Denali fault and the Totschunda fault which includes small normal faults had a peak displacement of 2.7 m (8 ft 10 in), while the main Totschunda fault slipped an average of 1.5 m (4 ft 11 in) with a peak of 2.1 m (6 ft 11 in) found. Two areas of high seismic moment were observed 70 km (43 mi) and 200 km (120 mi) from the epicenter. Three subevents were observed during the event: the first was a M_{w} 7.2 primarily thrust event along the Susitna Glacier thrust with potential simultaneous Denali fault rupture. The second, an M_{w} 7.3 subevent, ruptured along the Denali fault, while the third, final, and largest M_{w} 7.6 subevent continued past the second event along the Denali and Totschunda faults where the maximum displacements of 8.8 m (29 ft) was observed. The total seismic moment of this earthquake corresponds to a magnitude of M_{w} 7.9.

There is evidence of local supershear propagation inferred from ground motions along at least 35 km (22 mi) of the rupture.

=== Aftershocks ===
Aftershocks primarily manifested in portions of fault where surface rupture was found, and aftershocks were usually limited to very shallow depths. South of Denali, aftershocks match the inferred characteristics of the Susitna Glacier thrust. Many aftershocks were actually on faults nearby that are not known to have ruptured, and may just be accommodating stress changes. On the Denali fault itself, there were fewer and smaller aftershocks than expected, with the largest only being a M_{w} 5.8 event.

== Earthquake damage ==
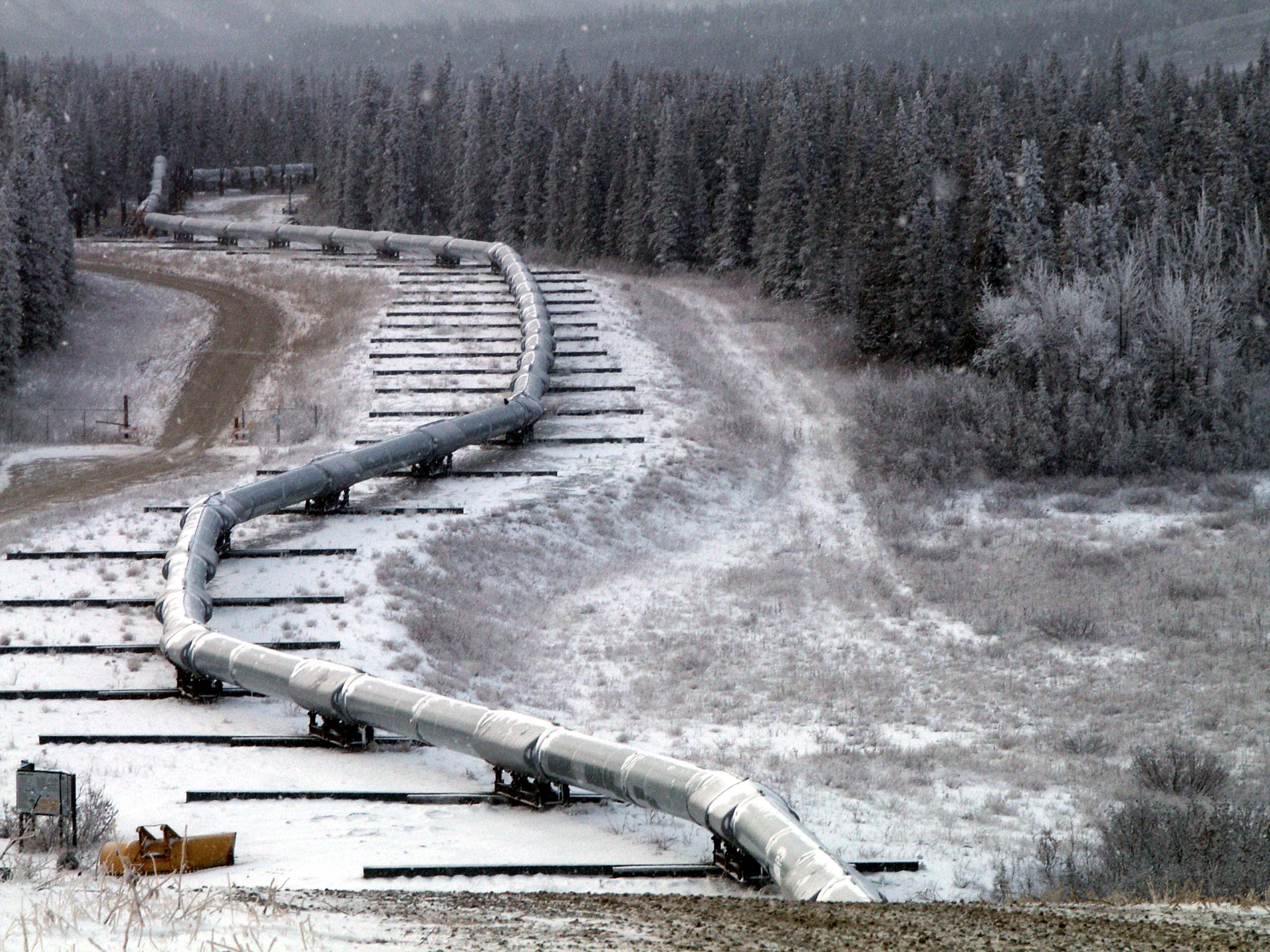
View of Trans-Alaska Pipeline showing deliberate offsets in construction, to accommodate movement on the fault

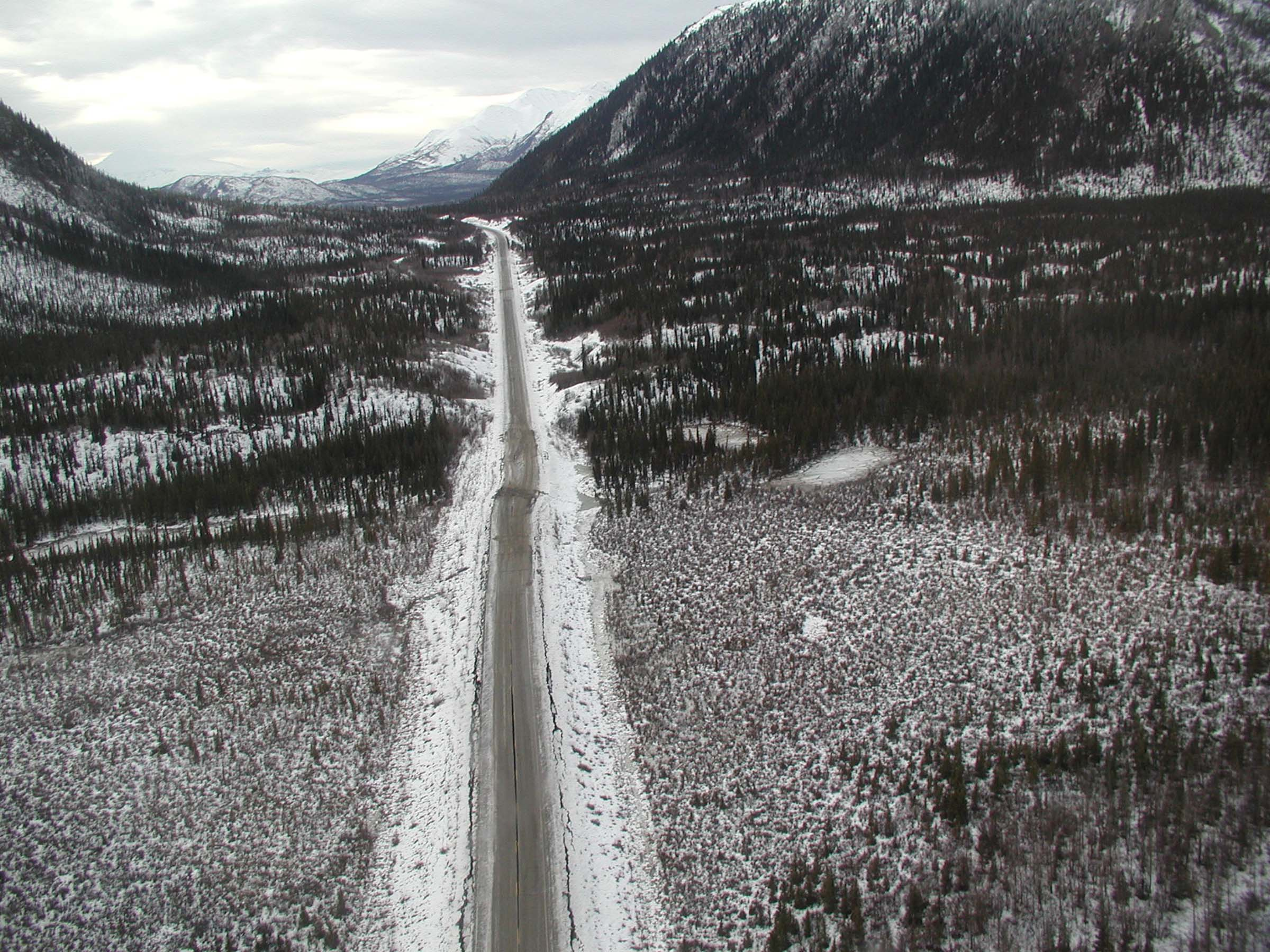
The Tok Cut-Off was offset 23 feet (7 m)

Minor damage was reported over a wide area but the only examples of severe damage were on highways that crossed the fault trace and areas that suffered liquefaction, e.g. Northway Airport. Liquefaction was more severe in the eastern end of the rupture compared to the west. Sand boils were also widespread, being reported in Fairbanks, Northway, and Delta River. Massive landslides occurred in the Alaska Range, but most were within 30 kilometers of the rupture. Several bridges were damaged but none so severely that they were closed to traffic.

Due to the general self-sufficiency of those living near the fault rupture, very few lifeline systems were compromised. These people tend to get water from private wells, heat their homes and cook their meals with gas furnaces and stoves, and maintain individual septic systems.

The Trans-Alaska Pipeline System crosses the rupture trace; the pipeline suffered some minor damage to supports. There was no oil spillage, as the pipeline at that location was designed to move laterally along beams to withstand major movement on the Denali Fault. The pipeline was shut down for three days to allow for inspections but was then reopened.

== See also ==
- List of earthquakes in 2002
- List of earthquakes in Alaska
- List of earthquakes in the United States
