= Maqên County =

Maqên County 玛沁县 · རྨ་ཆེན་རྫོང་། Maqin
- County
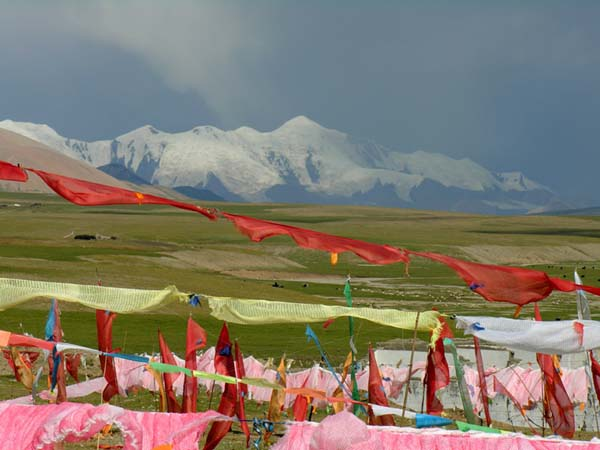
- Peak Amne Machin, the highest peak of the mountain range of the same name

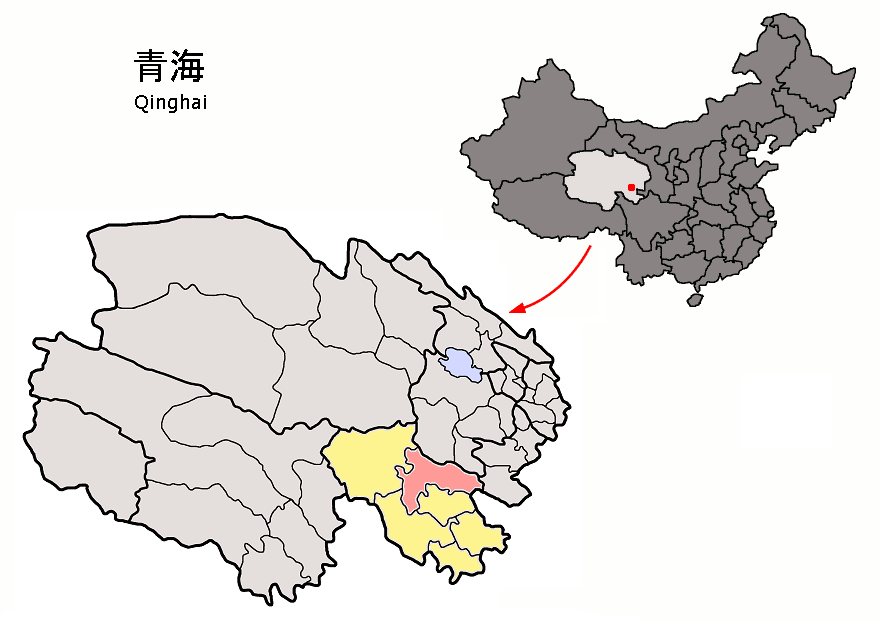
- Maqên County (light red) within Golog Prefecture (yellow) and Qinghai

- Location of the county seat in Qinghai
- Coordinates (Maqên County government): 34°28′41″N 100°14′20″E
- Country: China
- Province: Qinghai
- Autonomous prefecture: Golog
- County seat: Dawo (Dawu)

Area
  - Total: 13,400 km^{2} (5,200 sq mi)
- Elevation: 3,700 m (12,100 ft)

Population (2020)
  - Total: 58,117
  - Density: 4.34/km^{2} (11.2/sq mi)
- Time zone: UTC+8 (China Standard)
- Website: www.maqin.gov.cn

Maqên County

Chinese name
- Simplified Chinese: 玛沁县
- Traditional Chinese: 瑪沁縣
Transcriptions
Standard Mandarin
- Hanyu Pinyin: Mǎqìn Xiàn
- Wade–Giles: Ma-ch‘in hsien

Tibetan name
- Tibetan: རྨ་ཆེན་རྫོང
Transcriptions
- Wylie: rma chen rdzong
- Tibetan Pinyin: Maqên Zong

Maqên or Maqin County is a county of Qinghai Province, China. It is under the administration of Golog Tibetan Autonomous Prefecture.

== Name ==
The county is named for Anyê Maqên, the Tibetan name for a revered local mountain.

== Administrative divisions ==
Maqên is divided into two towns and six townships:

Name	Simplified Chinese	Hanyu Pinyin	Tibetan	Wylie	Administrative division code
Towns
Dawo Town (Dawu)	大武镇	Dàwǔ Zhèn	རྟ་བོ་གྲོང་བརྡལ།	rta bo grong brdal	632621100
Ra'gya Town (Lajia)	拉加镇	Lājiā Zhèn	རྭ་རྒྱ་གྲོང་བརྡལ།	rwa rgya grong brdal	632621101
Townships
Dawo Township (Dawu)	大武乡	Dàwǔ Xiāng	རྟ་བོ་ཡུལ་ཚོ།	rta bo yul tsho	632621200
Domkog Township (Dongqinggou)	东倾沟乡	Dōngqīnggōu Xiāng	སྡོམ་ཁོག་ཡུལ་ཚོ།	sdom khog yul tsho	632621201
Kangri Township (Xueshan)	雪山乡	Xuěshān Xiāng	གངས་རི་ཡུལ་ཚོ།	gangs ri yul tsho	632621202
Damai Township (Xiadawu)	下大武乡	Xiàdàwǔ Xiāng	རྟ་སྨད་ཡུལ་ཚོ།	rta smad yul tsho	632621203
Yigxung Township (Youyun)	优云乡	Yōuyún Xiāng	དབྱིག་གཞུང་ཡུལ་ཚོ།	dbyig gzhung yul tsho	632621204
Tanglag Township (Dangluo)	当洛乡	Dāngluò Xiāng	དྭངས་ལག་ཡུལ་ཚོ།	dwangs lag yul tsho	632621205

== Climate ==
Maqên County has a subalpine climate (Köppen Dwc) bordering on an alpine climate (ETH).

Climate data for Maqên County, elevation 3,719 m (12,201 ft), (1991–2020 normals, extremes 1981–2010)
Month	Jan	Feb	Mar	Apr	May	Jun	Jul	Aug	Sep	Oct	Nov	Dec	Year
Record high °C (°F)	10.1 (50.2)	12.8 (55.0)	17.8 (64.0)	21.9 (71.4)	22.5 (72.5)	24.5 (76.1)	26.3 (79.3)	25.1 (77.2)	25.2 (77.4)	21.5 (70.7)	12.8 (55.0)	10.9 (51.6)	26.3 (79.3)
Mean daily maximum °C (°F)	−0.3 (31.5)	2.1 (35.8)	5.6 (42.1)	9.9 (49.8)	12.8 (55.0)	15.0 (59.0)	17.4 (63.3)	17.5 (63.5)	14.6 (58.3)	9.3 (48.7)	4.5 (40.1)	0.8 (33.4)	9.1 (48.4)
Daily mean °C (°F)	−11.3 (11.7)	−8.0 (17.6)	−3.5 (25.7)	1.4 (34.5)	5.2 (41.4)	8.5 (47.3)	10.6 (51.1)	10.1 (50.2)	6.9 (44.4)	1.2 (34.2)	−5.5 (22.1)	−10.4 (13.3)	0.4 (32.8)
Mean daily minimum °C (°F)	−20.5 (−4.9)	−16.8 (1.8)	−11.1 (12.0)	−5.7 (21.7)	−1.0 (30.2)	3.2 (37.8)	5.0 (41.0)	4.3 (39.7)	1.6 (34.9)	−4.2 (24.4)	−12.7 (9.1)	−19.2 (−2.6)	−6.4 (20.4)
Record low °C (°F)	−33.1 (−27.6)	−31.9 (−25.4)	−29.1 (−20.4)	−20.0 (−4.0)	−12.8 (9.0)	−6.0 (21.2)	−4.0 (24.8)	−5.5 (22.1)	−7.5 (18.5)	−17.8 (0.0)	−26.6 (−15.9)	−33.1 (−27.6)	−33.1 (−27.6)
Average precipitation mm (inches)	3.2 (0.13)	4.6 (0.18)	9.1 (0.36)	20.5 (0.81)	62.0 (2.44)	98.9 (3.89)	118.2 (4.65)	100 (3.9)	77.9 (3.07)	30.8 (1.21)	4.4 (0.17)	1.4 (0.06)	531 (20.87)
Average precipitation days (≥ 0.1 mm)	4.1	5.5	8.2	10.7	17.4	20.2	20.2	18.4	18.0	13.3	3.8	2.2	142
Average snowy days	6.9	8.8	12.1	13.9	11.8	2.4	1.0	0.4	3.9	13.1	5.7	4.1	84.1
Average relative humidity (%)	51	50	51	55	63	69	72	72	72	66	57	50	61
Mean monthly sunshine hours	219.7	202.6	232.2	234.4	217.5	180.6	197.4	205.5	179.6	210.8	233.5	227.4	2,541.2
Percentage possible sunshine	70	65	62	60	50	42	45	50	49	61	76	75	59
Source: China Meteorological Administration

== See also ==
- List of administrative divisions of Qinghai
- Golog Maqin Airport
