= Darlag County =

Darlag County 达日县 · དར་ལག་རྫོང Dari
- County
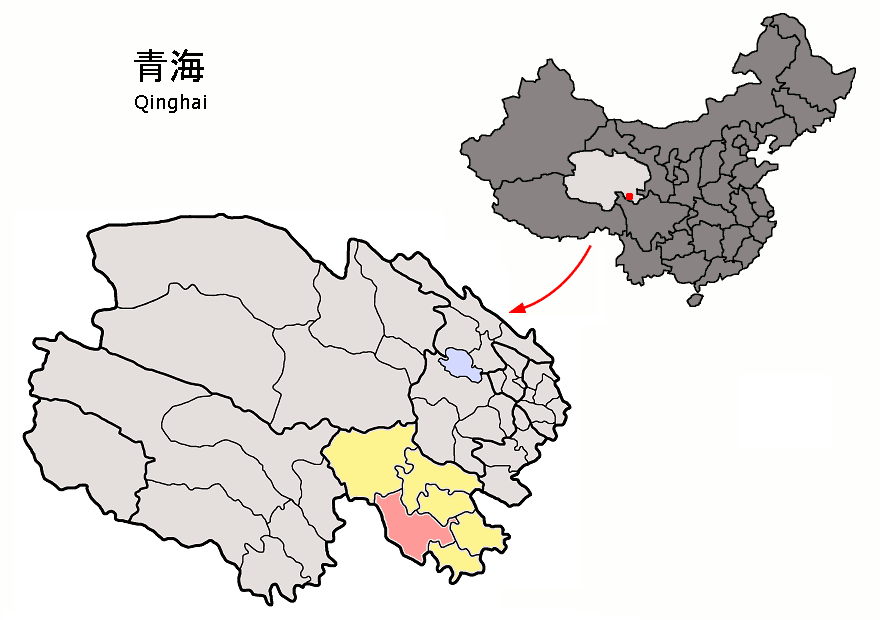
- Darlag County (light red) within Golog Prefecture (yellow) and Qinghai

- Location of the seat in Qinghai
- Coordinates: 33°24′N 99°20′E
- Country: China
- Province: Qinghai
- Autonomous prefecture: Golog
- County seat: Gyümai

Area
  - Total: 14,800 km^{2} (5,700 sq mi)

Population (2020)
  - Total: 40,197
  - Density: 2.72/km^{2} (7.03/sq mi)
- Time zone: UTC+8 (China Standard)
- Website: www.dari.gov.cn

Darlag County

Chinese name
- Simplified Chinese: 达日县
- Traditional Chinese: 達日縣
Transcriptions
Standard Mandarin
- Hanyu Pinyin: Dárì Xiàn

Tibetan name
- Tibetan: དར་ལག་རྫོང
Transcriptions
- Wylie: dar lag rdzong
- Tibetan Pinyin: Tarlag Zong

Darlag County (Tibetan: དར་ལག་རྫོང; Chinese: 达日县) is a county of southeastern Qinghai province, China, bordering Sichuan to the south and west. It is under the administration of Golog Tibetan Autonomous Prefecture. The county seat is in the Town of Gyümai.

== Geography and climate ==
With an elevation of around 3,970 metres (13,020 ft), Darlag County has a subalpine climate (Köppen Dwc), closely bordering upon an alpine climate (Köppen ETH), with long, very cold winters, and short, rainy, cool summers. Average low temperatures are below freezing from mid September to late May; however, due to the wide diurnal temperature variation, average highs are only below freezing from mid/late November through early March. With monthly percent possible sunshine ranging from 47% in June to 70% in November, the county seat receives 2,439 hours of bright sunshine annually. The monthly 24-hour average temperature ranges from −11.8 °C (10.8 °F) in January to 10.1 °C (50.2 °F) in July, while the annual mean is −0.1 °C (31.8 °F). Over 70% of the annual precipitation of 572 mm (22.5 in) is delivered from June to September.

Climate data for Darlag County, elevation 3,968 m (13,018 ft), (1991–2020 normals, extremes 1971–2016)
Month	Jan	Feb	Mar	Apr	May	Jun	Jul	Aug	Sep	Oct	Nov	Dec	Year
Record high °C (°F)	11.9 (53.4)	10.4 (50.7)	14.7 (58.5)	18.3 (64.9)	21.6 (70.9)	21.9 (71.4)	24.3 (75.7)	24.4 (75.9)	23.3 (73.9)	20.9 (69.6)	10.6 (51.1)	10.1 (50.2)	24.4 (75.9)
Mean daily maximum °C (°F)	−2.4 (27.7)	0.1 (32.2)	3.4 (38.1)	7.7 (45.9)	11.3 (52.3)	14.1 (57.4)	16.6 (61.9)	16.5 (61.7)	13.6 (56.5)	7.7 (45.9)	2.6 (36.7)	−1.2 (29.8)	7.5 (45.5)
Daily mean °C (°F)	−11.8 (10.8)	−8.4 (16.9)	−4.2 (24.4)	0.7 (33.3)	4.5 (40.1)	8.0 (46.4)	10.1 (50.2)	9.5 (49.1)	6.5 (43.7)	0.6 (33.1)	−5.9 (21.4)	−10.9 (12.4)	−0.1 (31.8)
Mean daily minimum °C (°F)	−19.5 (−3.1)	−15.8 (3.6)	−10.4 (13.3)	−4.9 (23.2)	−0.7 (30.7)	3.3 (37.9)	5.0 (41.0)	4.2 (39.6)	1.7 (35.1)	−4.1 (24.6)	−12.2 (10.0)	−18.5 (−1.3)	−6.0 (21.2)
Record low °C (°F)	−35.6 (−32.1)	−30.3 (−22.5)	−26.4 (−15.5)	−16.1 (3.0)	−10.8 (12.6)	−4.8 (23.4)	−3.4 (25.9)	−5.2 (22.6)	−7.8 (18.0)	−17.8 (0.0)	−25.5 (−13.9)	−34.0 (−29.2)	−35.6 (−32.1)
Average precipitation mm (inches)	6.8 (0.27)	8.3 (0.33)	16.3 (0.64)	28.8 (1.13)	66.7 (2.63)	112.6 (4.43)	113.0 (4.45)	96.3 (3.79)	80.5 (3.17)	34.2 (1.35)	5.8 (0.23)	3.4 (0.13)	572.7 (22.55)
Average precipitation days (≥ 0.1 mm)	7.0	7.8	12.0	14.1	19.3	21.6	20.4	18.1	19.4	14.9	5.3	4.3	164.2
Average snowy days	8.8	10.3	14.8	16.2	15.6	3.7	0.8	0.8	4.9	14.6	7.1	6.2	103.8
Average relative humidity (%)	50	49	52	56	63	69	70	70	72	67	55	49	60
Mean monthly sunshine hours	192.3	178.9	209.8	225.5	214.0	186.5	216.3	216.1	189.1	198.8	208.1	203.5	2,438.9
Percentage possible sunshine	61	57	56	57	49	43	50	53	52	57	68	66	56
Source: China Meteorological Administration all-time extreme temperature

== Administrative divisions ==
Darlag is divided into 1 town and 9 townships:

Name	Simplified Chinese	Hanyu Pinyin	Tibetan	Wylie	Administrative division code
Town
Gyümai Town (Jimai)	吉迈镇	Jímài Zhèn	རྒྱུ་སྨད་གྲོང་རྡལ།	rgyu smad grong rdal	632624100
Townships
Marzhing Township (Manzhang)	满掌乡	Mǎnzhǎng Xiāng	སྨར་འབྲིང་ཡུལ་ཚོ།	smar 'bring yul tsho	632624200
Dêrnang Township (De'ang)	德昂乡	Dé'áng Xiāng	སྡེར་ནང་ཡུལ་ཚོ།	sder nang yul tsho	632624201
Oisêr Township (Wosai)	窝赛乡	Wōsài Xiāng	འོད་ཟེར་ཡུལ་ཚོ།	'od zer yul tsho	632624202
Boiba Township (Moba)	莫坝乡	Mòbà Xiāng	འབོ་པ་ཡུལ་ཚོ།	'bo pa yul tsho	632624203
Boingor Doima Township (Shanghongke)	上红科乡	Shànghóngkē Xiāng	དཔོན་སྒོར་སྟོད་མ་ཞང་།	dpon sgor stod ma zhang	632624204
Boingor Mangma Township (Xiahongke)	下红科乡	Xiàhóngkē Xiāng	དཔོན་སྐོར་སྨང་མ་ཡུལ་ཚོ།	dpon sgor smang ma yul tsho	632624205
Zugzhün Township (Jianshe)	建设乡	Jiànshè Xiāng	འཛུགས་སྐྲུན་ཡུལ་ཚོ།	'dzugs skrun yul tsho	632624206
Sangrima Township (Sangrima, Sangruma)	桑日麻乡	Sāngrìmá Xiāng	གསང་རི་མ་ཡུལ་ཚོ།	gsang ri ma yul tsho	632624207
Dagtog Township (Tehetu)	特合土乡	Tèhétǔ Xiāng	སྟག་ཐོག་ཡུལ་ཚོ།	stag thog yul tsho	632624208

== See also ==
- List of administrative divisions of Qinghai
