= Gyaring Lake =

Lake of China

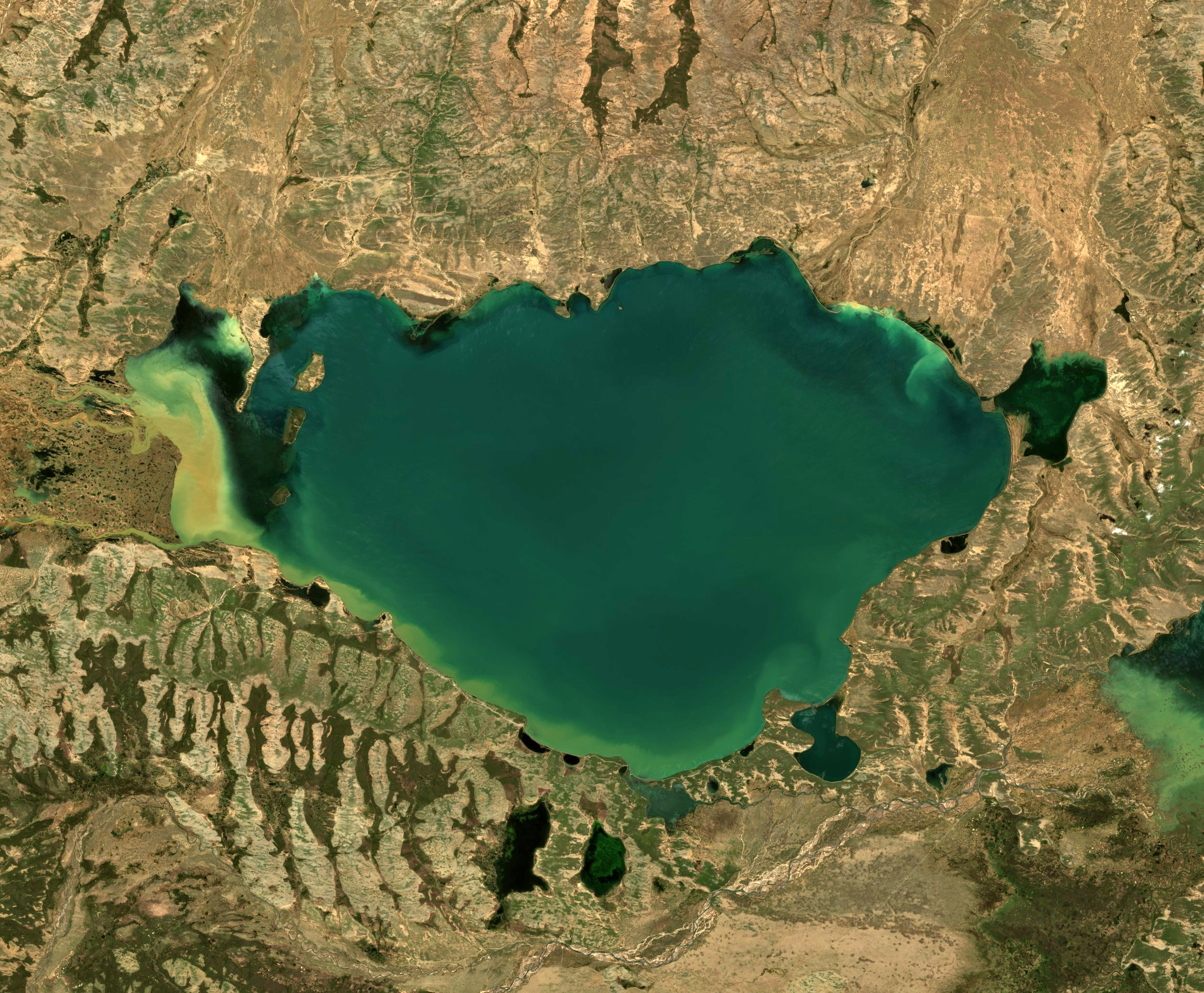

- Location within China
- Coordinates: 34°55′N 97°16′E
- Type: Fresh water lake
- Primary inflows: Yellow River, Kari Qu
- Primary outflows: Yellow River
- Catchment area: 8,161 km^{2} (3,151 sq mi)
- Basin countries: China
- Max. length: 35 km (22 mi)
- Max. width: 21.6 km (13 mi)
- Surface area: 526 km^{2} (200 sq mi)
- Average depth: 8.9 m (29 ft)
- Max. depth: 13.1 m (43 ft)
- Water volume: 4.67 billion cubic metres (3.79×10^{6} acre⋅ft)
- Surface elevation: 4,292 m (14,081 ft)

Ramsar Wetland
- Official name: Zhaling Lake
- Designated: 12 July 2004
- Reference no.: 1442

Gyaring Lake (Tibetan: མཚོ་སྐྱ་རིང་, Wylie: mtsho skya ring) or Zhaling Lake (Chinese: 扎陵湖; pinyin: Zhālíng Hú) is a large freshwater lake in the Yellow River catchment in China, it is in the southeast of Qinghai Province, on the border between Yushu Tibetan Autonomous Prefecture and Golog Tibetan Autonomous Prefecture. The lake's Tibetan name means "Long Gray Lake". Gyaring Lake is 526 km^{2}, with a drainage area of 8161 km^{2}, an elevation of 4292 m, a length of 35 km and a mean width of 15 km (max 21.6 km).

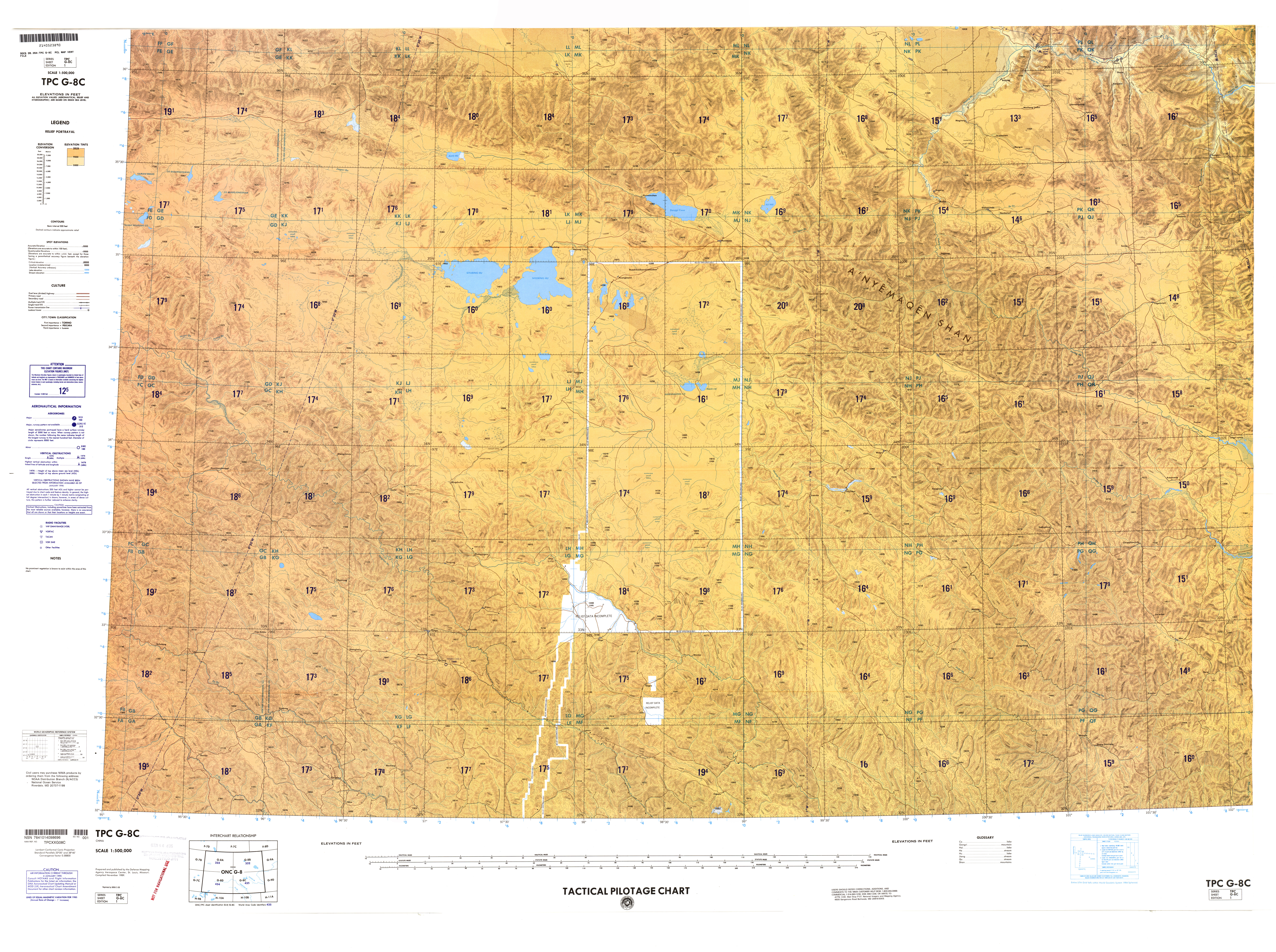
Map including Gyaring Hu

== Climate ==
Climate data for Gyaring Lake
Month	Jan	Feb	Mar	Apr	May	Jun	Jul	Aug	Sep	Oct	Nov	Dec	Year
Mean daily maximum °C (°F)	−7.4 (18.7)	−4.8 (23.4)	0.0 (32.0)	4.9 (40.8)	8.5 (47.3)	11.4 (52.5)	14.1 (57.4)	13.8 (56.8)	9.9 (49.8)	4.0 (39.2)	−2.4 (27.7)	−6.0 (21.2)	3.8 (38.9)
Daily mean °C (°F)	−15.3 (4.5)	−12.6 (9.3)	−7.5 (18.5)	−2.1 (28.2)	2.3 (36.1)	5.6 (42.1)	8.3 (46.9)	7.6 (45.7)	4.1 (39.4)	−2.0 (28.4)	−10.0 (14.0)	−14.3 (6.3)	−3.0 (26.6)
Mean daily minimum °C (°F)	−23.2 (−9.8)	−20.3 (−4.5)	−14.9 (5.2)	−9.0 (15.8)	−3.9 (25.0)	−0.1 (31.8)	2.5 (36.5)	1.5 (34.7)	−1.7 (28.9)	−8.0 (17.6)	−17.5 (0.5)	−22.6 (−8.7)	−9.8 (14.4)
Average precipitation mm (inches)	4 (0.2)	5 (0.2)	8 (0.3)	12 (0.5)	30 (1.2)	62 (2.4)	73 (2.9)	63 (2.5)	48 (1.9)	18 (0.7)	4 (0.2)	3 (0.1)	330 (13.1)
Source: Climate-Data.org
