= Ground failure =

The term ground failure is a general reference to landslides, liquefaction, lateral spreads, and any other consequence of shaking that affects the stability of the ground. This usually takes place as an after-effect of an earthquake, and is one of the major causes of destruction after an earthquake. Ground failures tend to happen almost every time after an earthquake, usually causing landslides, settling and spreading. Which as a result, can reduce the fertility of the ground for further cultivation, and also damage manmade or natural structures.

== Overview ==
In geology, it means an effect of seismic activity, such as an earthquake, where the ground becomes very soft, due to the shaking, and acts like a liquid, causing landslides, spreading, and settling. Earthquake-triggered landslides and liquefaction, collectively referred to as ground failure, can be a significant contributor to earthquake losses. The USGS Ground Failure (GF) earthquake product provides near-real-time spatial estimates of earthquake-triggered landslide and liquefaction hazard following significant earthquakes worldwide. Ground failure can be hazardous to nature, and also to mankind.
