= Denali Fault =

Major intercontinental dextral strike-slip fault in North America

- Etymology: Denali (mountain)
- Location: British Columbia, Canada and Alaska, USA
- Coordinates: 63.4902°N 148.1257°W

Tectonics
- Plate: North American plate
- Earthquakes: 2002 Denali earthquake
- Type: strike-slip fault
- Movement: dextral

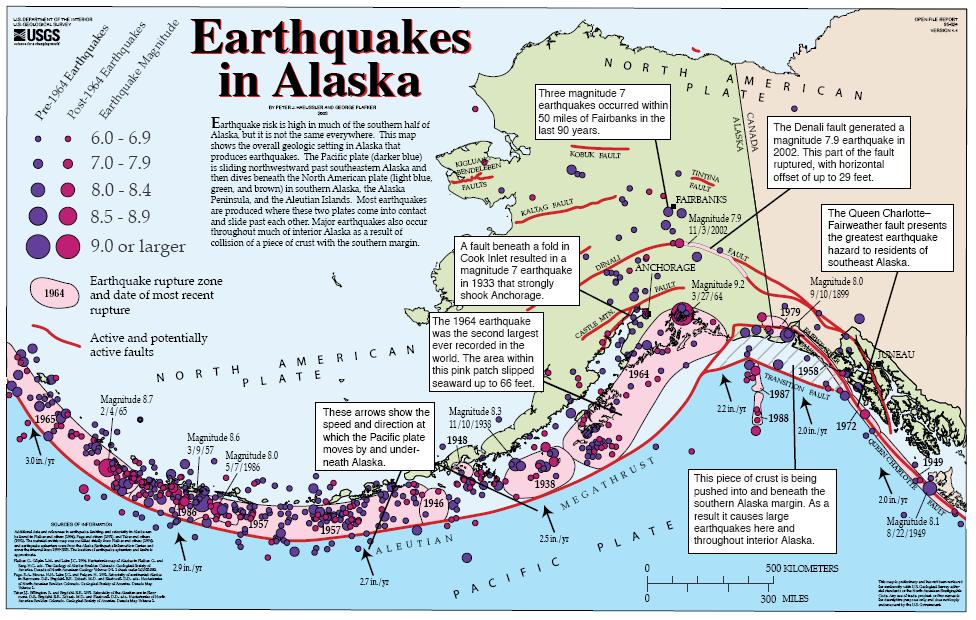
Tectonic map of Alaska and northwestern Canada showing main faults and historic earthquakes

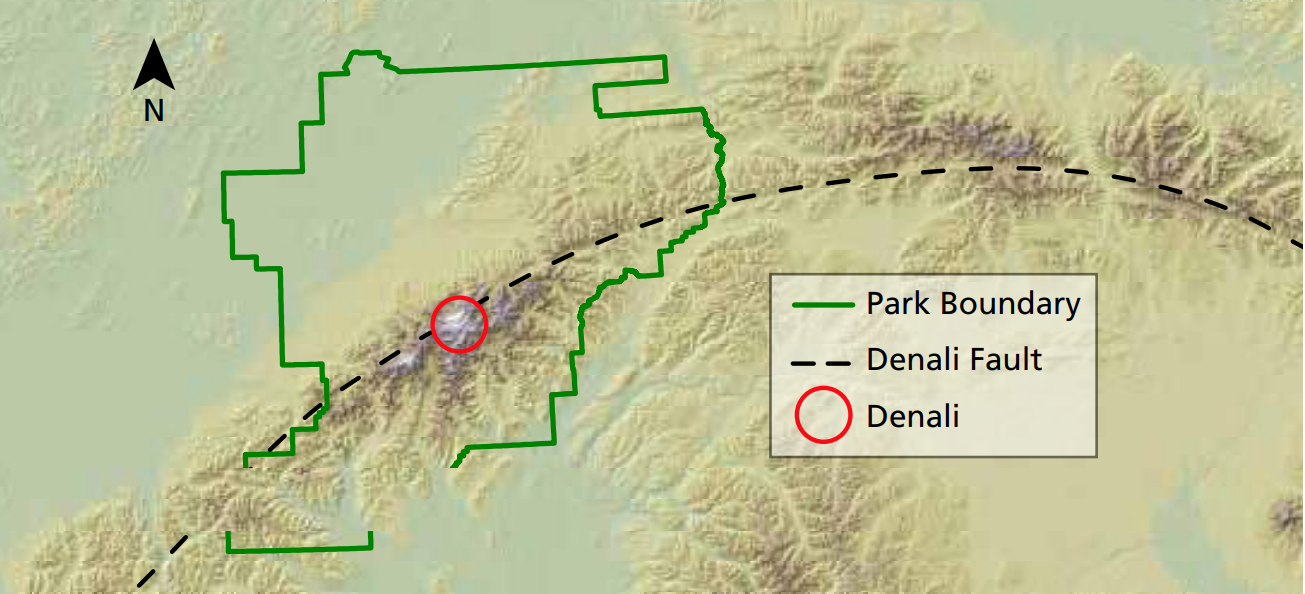
Denali Fault and the Denali National Park boundary

The Denali Fault is a major intracontinental dextral (right lateral) strike-slip fault in western North America, extending from northwestern British Columbia, Canada to the central region of the U.S. state of Alaska.

== Location ==
The Denali Fault is located in the southern half of Alaska in the Alaska Range. It is more than 1,250 miles long, arcing through southern Alaska, southwestern Yukon, and back into southeastern Alaska.

The steep north face of Denali, known as the Wickersham Wall, rises 15,000 feet from its base, and is a result of relatively recent vertical movement along the fault.

== Effects ==
Alaska's network of faults is a result of tectonic activity; the Pacific plate is actively subducting (sliding under) the North American plate, and the Denali Fault is located on the boundary between the two plates. Along the Denali Fault, lateral and vertical offset movement is taking place at a rate of approximately 13 mm/yr. Around 300 to 400 kilometers of displacement has occurred since the Cretaceous, and about 25% of that displacement has occurred since the Miocene.

According to tree ring studies, a magnitude 7.2 to 7.4 earthquake happened along the fault in 1912.

It was the main fault along which the 2002 Denali earthquake occurred, which was measured as a magnitude of 7.9 M_{w}. During the afternoon of November 3, 2002, the water in Seattle's Lake Union suddenly began sloshing hard enough to knock houseboats off their moorings. Water in pools, ponds, and bayous as far away as Texas and Louisiana splashed for nearly half an hour.

The earthquake began at 1:12 p.m. Alaska local time, and was centered approximately 135 kilometers (84 miles) south of Fairbanks and 283 kilometers (176 miles) north of Anchorage. Shaking at the epicenter lasted approximately 1.5 to 2 minutes, but in Fairbanks the duration of the earthquake was over 3 minutes.

Originating on the previously unknown Susitna Glacier Fault, the earthquake shot eastward along the well-known Denali Fault at a speed of over 11,265 kilometers (7,000 miles) per hour before branching southeast onto the Totschunda Fault. The resulting surface rupture was approximately 336 kilometers (209 miles) long, and it cut through streams, divided forests, opened chasms in roads, and even generated fault traces visible across several glaciers. Because the earthquake released most of its energy on the sparsely populated eastern end of the fault, Alaska's major cities were spared serious damage.

== See also ==
- Tintina Fault
