= 2001 Kunlun earthquake =

2001 earthquake in western China

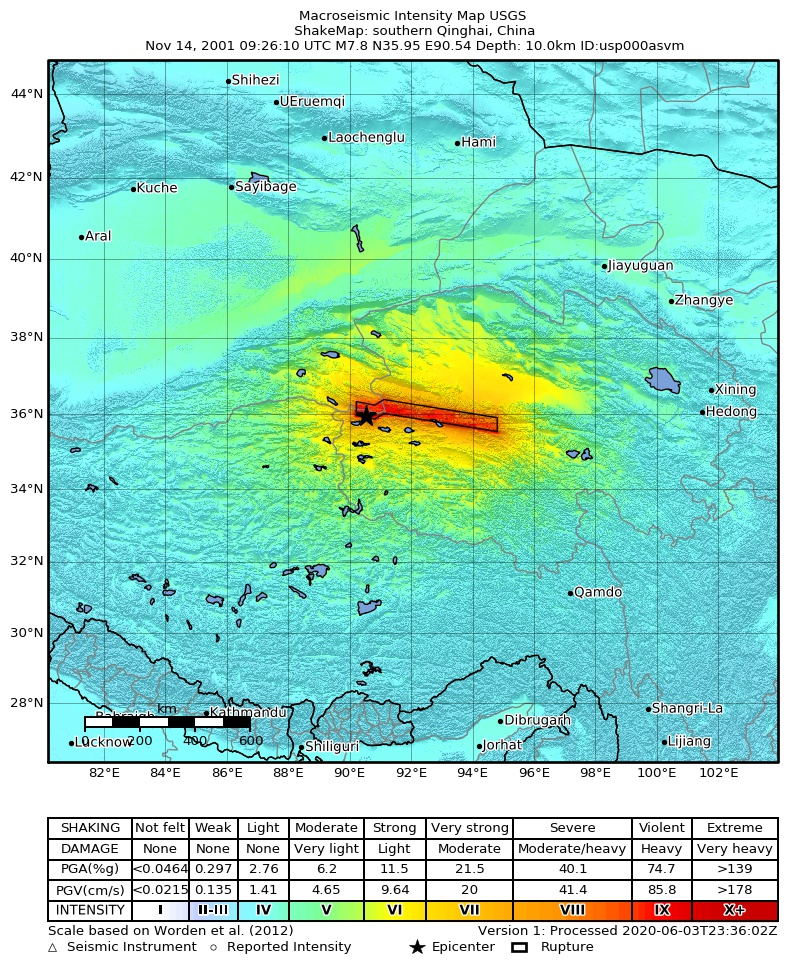

- Location within Qinghai Location within China
- UTC time: 2001-11-14 09:26:10
- ISC event: 2331800
- USGS-ANSS: ComCat
- Local date: 14 November 2001
- Local time: 17:26
- Magnitude: 7.8 M_{w} 8.1 M_{s}
- Depth: 15 km (9.3 mi)
- Epicenter: 36°12′N 90°54′E
- Fault: Kunlun Fault
- Type: Strike-slip, Supershear earthquake
- Areas affected: China
- Max. intensity: MMI X (Extreme)
- Casualties: none

An earthquake occurred in China on 14 November 2001 at 09:26 UTC (17:26 local time), with an epicenter near Kokoxili, close to the border between Qinghai and Xinjiang in a remote mountainous region. With a magnitude of 7.8 M_{w} (8.1 M_{s}), it was the most powerful earthquake in China in 5 decades. No casualties were reported, presumably due to the very low population density and the lack of high-rise buildings. This earthquake was associated with the longest surface rupture ever recorded on land at the time, ~450 km.

== Tectonic setting ==
The Kunlun fault is one of the major sinistral strike-slip structures that accommodate the eastward motion of the Tibetan Plateau relative to the Eurasian plate. This motion is caused by the lateral spreading of the zone of thickened crust associated with the collision between the Indian and Eurasian plates.

== Earthquake ==
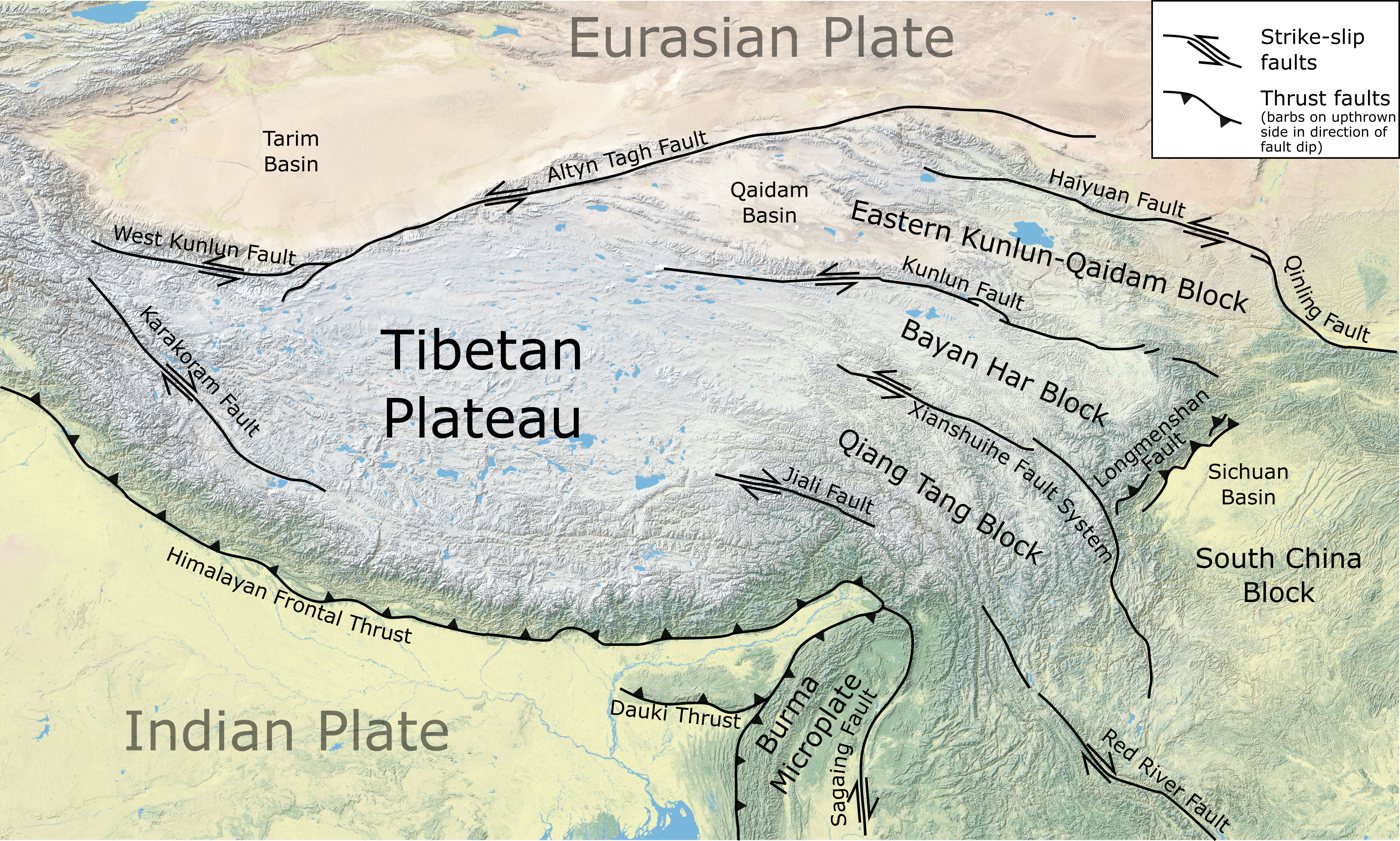
Major fault zones around the Tibetan Plateau showing location of Kunlun fault

The earthquake rupture began on a relatively small strike-slip fault segment at the western end of the Kunlun fault in the region of the mountain Buka Daban Feng. The rupture propagated to the east via an extensional stepover before following the main strand of the Kunlun fault. The region of co-seismic deformation (i.e. that occurred during the earthquake) is unusually large, with significant faulting being observed up to 60 km from the main rupture trace. This deformation occurs in two swathes, ca. 20 and 60 km from the main fault trace. Pre-existing lineaments and geomorphological features suggest that this earthquake-triggered displacement occurred on existing faults. The co-seismic surface rupture extended for more than 400 km, making it the longest zone of co-seismic surface rupture so far observed.

An analysis of the propagation speed indicates that the rupture propagated at a normal velocity along the original segment, but increased in velocity to above the S wave velocity after the jump across the extensional stepover and continued at that speed until propagation stopped. This makes the Kunlun earthquake the best documented example of a supershear earthquake. It has been suggested that the unusually wide zone of co-seismic deformation is a direct result of the supershear rupture propagation.

== Damage ==
Due to the remoteness of the region, most reports of damage came from areas hundreds of kilometers from the epicenter. The nearest population centre, the city of Golmud, reported severe shaking but no buildings collapsed. Some damage was reported at the construction site for the Qinghai–Tibet railway and along the Qinghai–Tibet highway.

== See also ==
- List of earthquakes in 2001
- List of earthquakes in China
