= Gadê County =

Gadê County 甘德县 • དགའ་བདེ་རྫོང Gande
- County
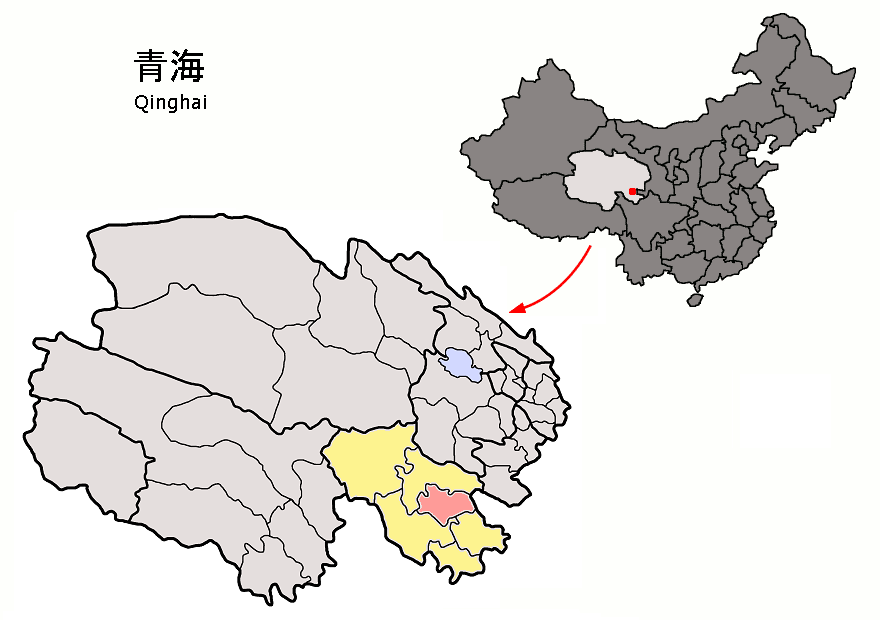
- Gadê County (light red) within Golog Prefecture (yellow) and Qinghai

- Location of the seat in Qinghai
- Coordinates: 34°00′N 100°09′E
- Country: China
- Province: Qinghai
- Autonomous prefecture: Golog
- County seat: Koqu

Area
  - Total: 7,046 km^{2} (2,720 sq mi)

Population (2020)
  - Total: 41,046
  - Density: 5.825/km^{2} (15.09/sq mi)
- Time zone: UTC+8 (China Standard)
- Website: www.gande.gov.cn

Gadê County

Chinese name
- Simplified Chinese: 甘德县
- Traditional Chinese: 甘德縣
Transcriptions
Standard Mandarin
- Hanyu Pinyin: Gāndé Xiàn
Yue: Cantonese
- Jyutping: gam^{1}dak^{1} jyun^{2}

Tibetan name
- Tibetan: དགའ་བདེ་རྫོང
Transcriptions
- Wylie: dga' bde rdzong
- Tibetan Pinyin: Gadê Zong

Gadê County (Tibetan: དགའ་བདེ་རྫོང; Chinese: 甘德县; pinyin: Gāndé Xiàn) is a county in the southeast of Qinghai Province, China, bordering Gansu to the east. It is under the administration of Golog Tibetan Autonomous Prefecture.

== Administrative divisions ==
Gadê is divided into one town and six townships:

Name	Simplified Chinese	Hanyu Pinyin	Tibetan	Wylie	Administrative division code
Town
Koqu Town (Kequ)	柯曲镇	Kēqū Zhèn	ཁོ་ཆུ་གྲོང་རྡལ།	kho chu grong rdal	632623100
Townships
Kongdoi Township (Shanggongma)	上贡麻乡	Shànggòngmá Xiāng	གོང་སྟོད་ཡུལ་ཚོ།	gong stod yul tsho	632623200
Kongmang Township (Xiagongma)	下贡麻乡	Xiàgòngmá Xiāng	གོང་སྨང་ཡུལ་ཚོ།	gong stod yul tsho	632623201
Kanglung Township (Ganglong)	岗龙乡	Gǎnglóng Xiāng	གངས་ལུང་ཡུལ་ཚོ།	gangs lung yul tsho	632623202
Kyinzhi Township (Qingzhen)	青珍乡	Qīngzhēn Xiāng	ཁྱི་འབྲི་ཡུལ་ཚོ།	khyi 'bri yul tsho	632623203
Gyangqai Township (Jiangqian)	江千乡	Jiāngqiān Xiāng	རྒྱང་ཆད་ཡུལ་ཚོ།	rgyang chad yul tsho	632623204
Zangxoima Township (Xiazangke)	下藏科乡	Xiàzàngkē Xiāng	གཙང་ཞོལ་མ་ཡུལ་ཚོ།	gtsang zhol ma yul tsho	632623205

== Climate ==
Climate data for Gadê, elevation 4,050 m (13,290 ft), (1991–2020 normals, extremes 1981–2010)
Month	Jan	Feb	Mar	Apr	May	Jun	Jul	Aug	Sep	Oct	Nov	Dec	Year
Record high °C (°F)	8.7 (47.7)	9.9 (49.8)	14.3 (57.7)	18.8 (65.8)	19.2 (66.6)	21.0 (69.8)	24.2 (75.6)	22.8 (73.0)	22.0 (71.6)	20.4 (68.7)	10.4 (50.7)	9.2 (48.6)	24.2 (75.6)
Mean daily maximum °C (°F)	−4.0 (24.8)	−1.4 (29.5)	2.4 (36.3)	7.0 (44.6)	10.6 (51.1)	13.4 (56.1)	15.8 (60.4)	15.8 (60.4)	12.8 (55.0)	6.8 (44.2)	1.3 (34.3)	−2.6 (27.3)	6.5 (43.7)
Daily mean °C (°F)	−14.4 (6.1)	−10.8 (12.6)	−6.2 (20.8)	−0.6 (30.9)	3.4 (38.1)	7.0 (44.6)	9.1 (48.4)	8.4 (47.1)	5.2 (41.4)	−1.0 (30.2)	−8.2 (17.2)	−13.4 (7.9)	−1.8 (28.8)
Mean daily minimum °C (°F)	−22.9 (−9.2)	−19.0 (−2.2)	−13.3 (8.1)	−7.0 (19.4)	−2.4 (27.7)	1.8 (35.2)	3.3 (37.9)	2.4 (36.3)	−0.1 (31.8)	−6.3 (20.7)	−15.3 (4.5)	−21.8 (−7.2)	−8.4 (16.9)
Record low °C (°F)	−39.3 (−38.7)	−33.9 (−29.0)	−31.5 (−24.7)	−18.6 (−1.5)	−15.4 (4.3)	−7.7 (18.1)	−6.4 (20.5)	−7.8 (18.0)	−11.4 (11.5)	−24.3 (−11.7)	−31.7 (−25.1)	−38.4 (−37.1)	−39.3 (−38.7)
Average precipitation mm (inches)	6.8 (0.27)	9.1 (0.36)	15.6 (0.61)	25.6 (1.01)	67.0 (2.64)	102.9 (4.05)	102.7 (4.04)	91.6 (3.61)	75.9 (2.99)	33.4 (1.31)	6.7 (0.26)	3.6 (0.14)	540.9 (21.29)
Average precipitation days (≥ 0.1 mm)	7.7	8.9	12.2	13.3	19.0	21.8	20.0	18.7	19.1	15.3	5.3	4.5	165.8
Average snowy days	10.2	12.0	15.6	16.2	17.4	6.1	1.2	1.8	7.4	17.3	8.2	6.4	119.8
Average relative humidity (%)	57	55	57	59	66	72	73	74	75	71	61	55	65
Mean monthly sunshine hours	197.7	176.6	208.7	223.3	207.1	176.2	201.4	205.8	173.1	190.9	214.8	214.0	2,389.6
Percentage possible sunshine	62	57	56	57	48	41	46	50	47	55	70	70	55
Source: China Meteorological Administration

== See also ==
- List of administrative divisions of Qinghai
