= Kunlun Fault =

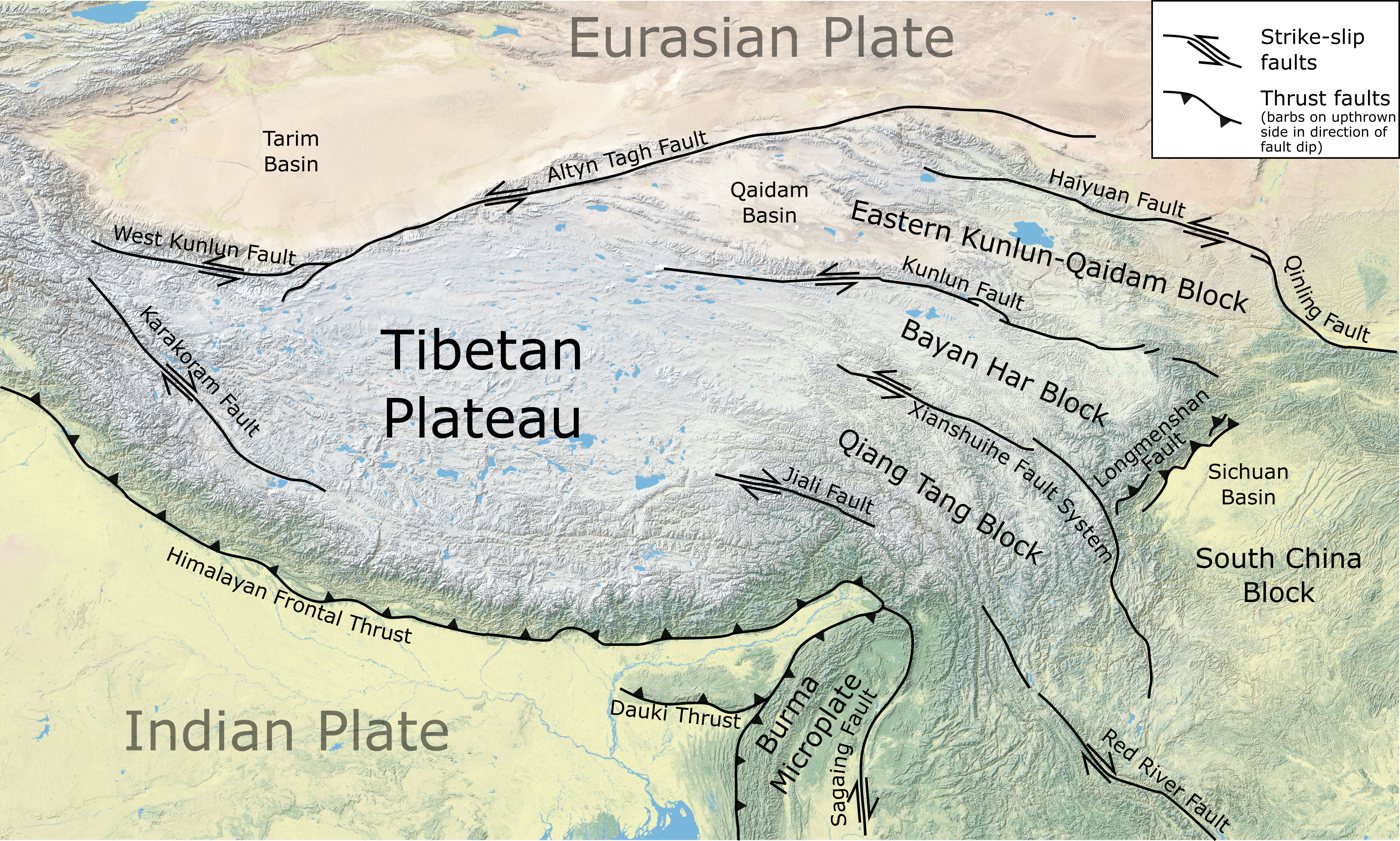
Tectonic map of the Tibetan Plateau showing location of the Kunlun fault

The Kunlun Fault is a major active left-lateral strike-slip fault to the north side of Tibet. Slippage along the 1,500-kilometre-long (930 mi) fault has occurred at a constant rate for the last 40,000 years. This has resulted in a cumulative offset of more than 400 metres (1,300 ft). The fault is seismically active, most recently causing the magnitude 7.8 2001 Kunlun earthquake. It forms the northeastern boundary of the elongate wedge of the Tibetan Plateau known as the Bayan Har block.
