= Golog Tibetan Autonomous Prefecture =

Autonomous prefectures in Qinghai, Tibet, China

Golog Prefecture 果洛州 · མགོ་ལོག་ཁུལ།
- Autonomous prefectures
- 果洛藏族自治州 · མགོ་ལོག་བོད་རིགས་རང་སྐྱོང་ཁུལ་ Golog Tibetan Autonomous Prefecture
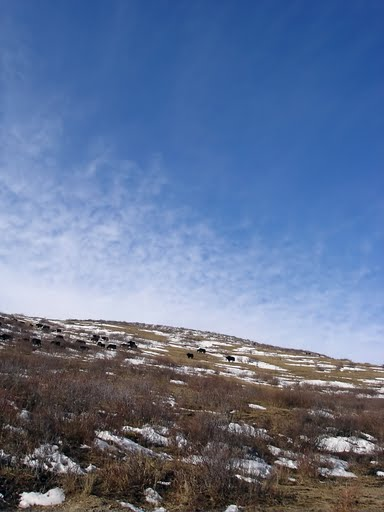
- Eastern Golog Tibetan Autonomous Prefecture

- Location of Golog Tibetan Autonomous Prefecture in Qinghai
- Coordinates: 34°07′N 99°19′E
- Country: China
- Province: Qinghai
- Prefecture seat: Maqên County (Dawu)

Area
  - Total: 74,246 km^{2} (28,667 sq mi)

Population
  - Total: 215,600
  - Density: 2.904/km^{2} (7.521/sq mi)

GDP
  - Total: CN¥ 3.6 billion US$ 0.6 billion
  - Per capita: CN¥ 18,238; US$ 2,928
- Time zone: UTC+8 (China Standard)
- ISO 3166 code: CN-QH-26
- Website: www.guoluo.gov.cn

Golog (Golok or Guoluo) Tibetan Autonomous Prefecture (Chinese: 果洛藏族自治州; pinyin: Guǒluò Zàngzú Zìzhìzhōu; Tibetan: མགོ་ལོག་བོད་རིགས་རང་སྐྱོང་ཁུལ་, Wylie: Mgo-log Bod-rigs rang-skyong-khul) is an autonomous prefecture occupying the southeastern corner of Qinghai province, China. The prefecture has an area of 76,312 km^{2} (29,464 sq mi) and its seat is located in Maqên County. Due to its special geographical location and natural environment, the entire autonomous prefecture has been included in the Chinese largest natural environmental protection area — the Sanjiangyuan National Park.

== Geography ==
Golog Prefecture is located in the southeastern part of Qinghai, in the upper basin of the Yellow River. Gyaring Lake and Ngoring Lake on the western edge of the prefecture are considered to be the source of the Yellow River. However, these lakes do receive water from rivers that flow from locations even further west, in Qumarleb County of the Yushu Tibetan Autonomous Prefecture.

The lay of the land of the prefecture is largely determined by the Amne Machin mountain range (max elevation 6,282 m), which runs in the general northwest- to-southeast direction across the entire prefecture, and beyond. The existence of the ridge results in one of the great bends of the Yellow River, which first flows for several hundreds of kilometers toward the east and southeast along through the entire Golog Prefecture, along the southern side of the Amne Machin Range, until it reaches the borders of Gansu and Sichuan; it and then turns almost 180 degrees and flows toward the northwest for 200–300 km (120–190 mi) through several prefectures of the northeastern Qinghai, forming a section of the northeastern border of the Golog prefecture.

Several sections of the Sanjiangyuan ("Sources of Three Rivers") National Nature Reserve are within the prefecture.

== Climate ==
Climate data for Maqên County
Month	Jan	Feb	Mar	Apr	May	Jun	Jul	Aug	Sep	Oct	Nov	Dec	Year
Record high °C (°F)	10.1 (50.2)	12.8 (55.0)	17.8 (64.0)	21.9 (71.4)	22.5 (72.5)	24.5 (76.1)	26.3 (79.3)	25.1 (77.2)	25.2 (77.4)	21.5 (70.7)	12.8 (55.0)	10.9 (51.6)	26.3 (79.3)
Mean daily maximum °C (°F)	−0.5 (31.1)	1.6 (34.9)	5.4 (41.7)	9.5 (49.1)	12.6 (54.7)	14.8 (58.6)	17.0 (62.6)	17.0 (62.6)	14.1 (57.4)	9.1 (48.4)	4.1 (39.4)	0.7 (33.3)	8.8 (47.8)
Daily mean °C (°F)	−11.9 (10.6)	−8.8 (16.2)	−4.0 (24.8)	0.9 (33.6)	5.0 (41.0)	8.2 (46.8)	10.2 (50.4)	9.5 (49.1)	6.4 (43.5)	0.9 (33.6)	−6.3 (20.7)	−11.1 (12.0)	−0.1 (31.9)
Mean daily minimum °C (°F)	−21.4 (−6.5)	−17.7 (0.1)	−11.6 (11.1)	−6.2 (20.8)	−1.3 (29.7)	2.7 (36.9)	4.6 (40.3)	3.6 (38.5)	1.1 (34.0)	−4.5 (23.9)	−13.8 (7.2)	−20.2 (−4.4)	−7.1 (19.3)
Record low °C (°F)	−33.1 (−27.6)	−31.9 (−25.4)	−29.1 (−20.4)	−20.0 (−4.0)	−12.8 (9.0)	−6.0 (21.2)	−4.0 (24.8)	−5.5 (22.1)	−7.5 (18.5)	−17.8 (0.0)	−26.6 (−15.9)	−33.1 (−27.6)	−33.1 (−27.6)
Average precipitation mm (inches)	2.8 (0.11)	4.3 (0.17)	8.2 (0.32)	19.4 (0.76)	55.3 (2.18)	99.4 (3.91)	115.1 (4.53)	92.5 (3.64)	79.5 (3.13)	32.1 (1.26)	3.5 (0.14)	1.6 (0.06)	513.7 (20.21)
Source: China Meteorological Administration,

== Demographics ==
Old woman at temple in Golog, Tibet

According to the 2000 census, Guoluo has 137,940 inhabitants with a population density of 1.81 inhabitants/km^{2}.

=== Ethnic groups in Guoluo, 2000 census ===
Nationality	Population	Percentage
Tibetan	126,395	91.63%
Han	9,096	6.59%
Hui	1,529	1.11%
Salar	329	0.24%
Tu	302	0.22%
Others	289	0.21%

== Subdivisions ==
The prefecture is subdivided into six county-level divisions: six counties:

Map
#	Name	Hanzi	Hanyu Pinyin	Tibetan	Wylie Tibetan Pinyin	Population (2010 Census)	Area (km^{2})	Density (/km^{2})
1	Maqên County (Maqin County)	玛沁县	Mǎqìn Xiàn	རྨ་ཆེན་རྫོང་	rma chen rdzong Maqên Zong	51,245	13,636	3.75
2	Baima County (Banma County)	班玛县	Bānmǎ Xiàn	པད་མ་རྫོང་	pad ma rdzong Baima Zong	27,185	6,452	4.21
3	Gadê County (Gande County)	甘德县	Gāndé Xiàn	དགའ་བདེ་རྫོང་	dga' bde rdzong Gadê Zong	34,840	7,143	4.87
4	Darlag County (Dari County)	达日县	Dárì Xiàn	དར་ལག་རྫོང་	dar lag rdzong Tarlag Zong	30,995	15,385	2.01
5	Jigzhi County (Jiuzhi County)	久治县	Jiǔzhì Xiàn	གཅིག་སྒྲིལ་རྫོང་	gcig sgril rdzong Jigzhi Zong	26,081	8,696	2.99
6	Madoi County (Maduo County)	玛多县	Mǎduō Xiàn	རྨ་སྟོད་རྫོང་	rma stod rdzong Madoi Zong	11,336	25,000	0.45

== Transport ==
Construction for Guoluo Maqin Airport began in September 2012 and the airport opened on 1 July 2016.

3,000 km (1,900 mi) of new roads are expected to be built by 2015.
