= 1955 Zheduotang earthquake =

April 1955 earthquake in Sichuan, China

- Location within Sichuan
- UTC time: 1955-04-14 01:29:04
- ISC event: 889422
- USGS-ANSS: ComCat
- Local date: April 14, 1955
- Local time: 09:29:02 CST
- Magnitude: 7.0 M_{w} 7.1 M_{s}
- Depth: 10 km (6.2 mi)
- Epicenter: 29.957°N 101.759°E
- Fault: Xianshuihe fault system
- Type: Strike-slip
- Areas affected: Sichuan, China
- Max. intensity: MMI IX (Violent) CSIS X
- Landslides: Yes
- Casualties: 70 dead

The 1955 Zheduotang earthquake, also known as the Kangding earthquake occurred on April 14 at 09:29:02 local time near the city of Kangding in the Garzê Tibetan Autonomous Prefecture, Sichuan. The earthquake had a moment magnitude of 7.0 and a surface wave magnitude of 7.1 and struck at a depth of 10 km. Severe damage occurred in Kangding with the loss of 70 lives.

== Tectonic setting ==
Western Sichuan is situated at the edge of the Tibetan Plateau in a vast zone of complex continental deformation caused by the collision of the Indian Plate with the Eurasian Plate. As the thrusting of the Indian Plate beneath the Eurasian Plate along the Himalayas continues, the continental crust within the Eurasian Plate is actively uplifted and thickened, forming the Tibetan Plateau. As there are no active thrust structures within the plateau, compression is accommodated by strike-slip motion along large structures including the Altyn Tagh Fault, Kunlun Fault, Haiyuan Fault and Xianshuihe fault system. Left-lateral strike-slip motion squeezes the crustal blocks of the Tibetan Plateau outwards, forcing it to move eastwards. Meanwhile, the strike-slip motion also results in east–west extension of the plateau, causing normal faults to break within the thickened crust.

The Xianshuihe fault system is a 1,400-km-long active left-lateral strike-slip fault that accommodate the strike-slip motion in the Tibetan Plateau. The fault is one of the largest active intracontinental geological structure in the world. Beginning in 1893, at least 350 km of the fault length has ruptured in large successive earthquakes with magnitudes 6.5 or larger. Going back to the year 1700 to present-day, the fault has ruptured its entire 1,400 km length during large earthquakes.

== Earthquake ==
The earthquake specifically ruptured the Zheduotang Fault; a segment of the Xianshuihe fault system. The left-lateral strike-slip rupture mechanism is consistent with movement along the fault system. A 43-km-long surface rupture is associated with the mainshock. In a November 2020 study published in the academic journal Geological Journal, the moment magnitude of the mainshock was evaluated at 7.0 M_{w}. Previous studies have placed the surface wave and moment magnitudes at 7.5.

Coulomb stress transfer after the 1955 earthquake increased seismic strain on the adjacent Selaha Fault, also part of the Xianshuihe fault system. In 2014, an earthquake measuring magnitudes 5.9 ruptured the Selaha Fault, releasing some of the strain. Since the 1955 quake, the Zheduotang Fault has accumulated enough strain to generate a magnitude 6.5–6.8 earthquake with the potential to cause severe destruction.

== Damage ==
Many landslides were triggered and the ground fissured. Natural springs erupted water intensely or dried up. Spring water discolored after the quake. A total of 624 homes and temples were destroyed and 1,083 were damaged in Kangding. At least 70 people died and 217 were injured. Walls around the city toppled. Approximately 90% of the city's wooden-frame or adobe-constructed structures were destroyed. There were more than 30 landslides recorded, many of which blocked roads. In Luding County, shabby homes collapsed. Bridges, dams and ravines were seriously damaged or collapsed. Landslides affected an area of 4,416 km^{2}.

== See also ==
- List of earthquakes in 1955
- List of earthquakes in China
- List of earthquakes in Sichuan
