= 1923 Renda earthquake =

1923 earthquake in Sichuan, China

- Location within Sichuan
- UTC time: 1923-03-24 12:40:17
- ISC event: 911322
- USGS-ANSS: ComCat
- Local date: March 24, 1923
- Local time: 20:40:06 CST
- Magnitude: M_{s} 7.3
- Depth: 15 km (9.3 mi)
- Epicenter: 31.295°N 100.750°E
- Fault: Xianshuihe fault system
- Type: Strike-slip
- Areas affected: Sichuan, China
- Max. intensity: CSIS X MMI X (Extreme)
- Landslides: Yes
- Casualties: 4,800 dead

The 1923 Renda earthquake occurred on March 24 at 20:40 local time between the counties of Daofu and Luhuo in Sichuan, China. The estimated M_{s} 7.3 earthquake was assigned a maximum modified Mercalli intensity scale rating of X (Extreme). Severe damage occurred in Sichuan, killing an estimated 4,800 people.

== Tectonic setting ==
Western Sichuan is situated at the edge of the Tibetan Plateau in a vast zone of complex continental deformation caused by the collision of the Indian Plate with the Eurasian Plate. As the thrusting of the Indian Plate beneath the Eurasian Plate along the Himalayas continues, the continental crust within the Eurasian Plate is actively uplifted and thickened, forming the Tibetan Plateau. As there are no active thrust structures within the plateau, compression is accommodated by strike-slip motion along large structures including the Altyn Tagh Fault, Kunlun Fault, Haiyuan Fault and Xianshuihe fault system. Left-lateral strike-slip motion squeezes the crustal blocks of the Tibetan Plateau outwards, forcing it to move eastwards. Meanwhile, the strike-slip motion also results in east–west extension of the plateau, causing normal faults to break within the thickened crust.

== Earthquake ==
The Xianshuihe fault system is a 1,400-km-long active left-lateral strike-slip fault that accommodate the strike-slip motion in the Tibetan Plateau. The fault is one of the largest active intracontinental geological structure in the world. Beginning in 1893, at least 350 km of the fault length has ruptured in large successive earthquakes with magnitudes 6.5 or larger. Going back to the year 1700 to present-day, the fault has ruptured its entire 1,400 km length during large earthquakes.

A 60-kilometer-long surface rupture formed after the earthquake between Daofu and Renda. The immediate region around the surface rupture was also the meizoseismal area where the maximum intensity was X. The northwest extent of the rupture overlaps the eventual southeastern rupture zone of the 1973 Luhuo earthquake. Meanwhile, the farthest southeast rupture overlaps the northwest rupture extent of the 1981 Dawu earthquake. A maximum coseismic slip of 3.3 meters was measured near the village of Dazhai, while the average slip across the rupture was 3.0 meters. Coulomb stress transfer may have increased strain on the segment north of the 1923 earthquake rupture, causing it to fail during the 1973 earthquake.

== Damage ==
In Luhuo county, the city's defensive walls toppled to the ground. Many homes, official buildings, and places of worship were totally destroyed. Avalanches and landslides occurred on the mountains. Fissures measuring up to 2 meters across appeared in the ground. The death toll is in excess of 3,000 people.

Two villages in Dawu county were razed to the ground; none left standing. An estimated 500 people were killed in the county. Several residents died in Qianning while many homes and schools were lost. At Kangding, at least 1,300 people died during a severe rockfall. Many temples suffered partial collapses whils poorly constructed homes were destroyed. Damage to homes was also reported in Garzê Town, Xinlong and Litang.

== See also ==
- List of earthquakes in 1923
- List of earthquakes in China
- List of earthquakes in Sichuan
