= 1973 Luhuo earthquake =

Magnitude 7.6 Ms. earthquake in China

- Location within Sichuan
- UTC time: 1973-02-06 10:37:10
- ISC event: 763709
- USGS-ANSS: ComCat
- Local date: February 6, 1973
- Local time: 18:37 CST
- Magnitude: M_{s} 7.6
- Depth: 11 km (6.8 mi)
- Epicenter: 31.398°N 100.581°E
- Fault: Xianshuihe fault system
- Type: Strike-slip
- Areas affected: China
- Max. intensity: MMI X (Extreme)
- Landslides: Yes
- Aftershocks: M_{s} 6.3
- Casualties: 2,175–2,204 dead, 2,743 injured

The 1973 Luhuo earthquake struck near the town of Zhaggo in Garzê Tibetan Autonomous Prefecture of Sichuan Province, China on February 6, 1973, with a magnitude of 7.6 M_{s}. The earthquake had a maximum intensity of X (Extreme) on the Modified Mercalli intensity scale. It resulted in between 2,175 and 2,204 deaths and a further 2,743 injuries. Serious and widespread destruction occurred in Luhuo County.

== Tectonic setting ==
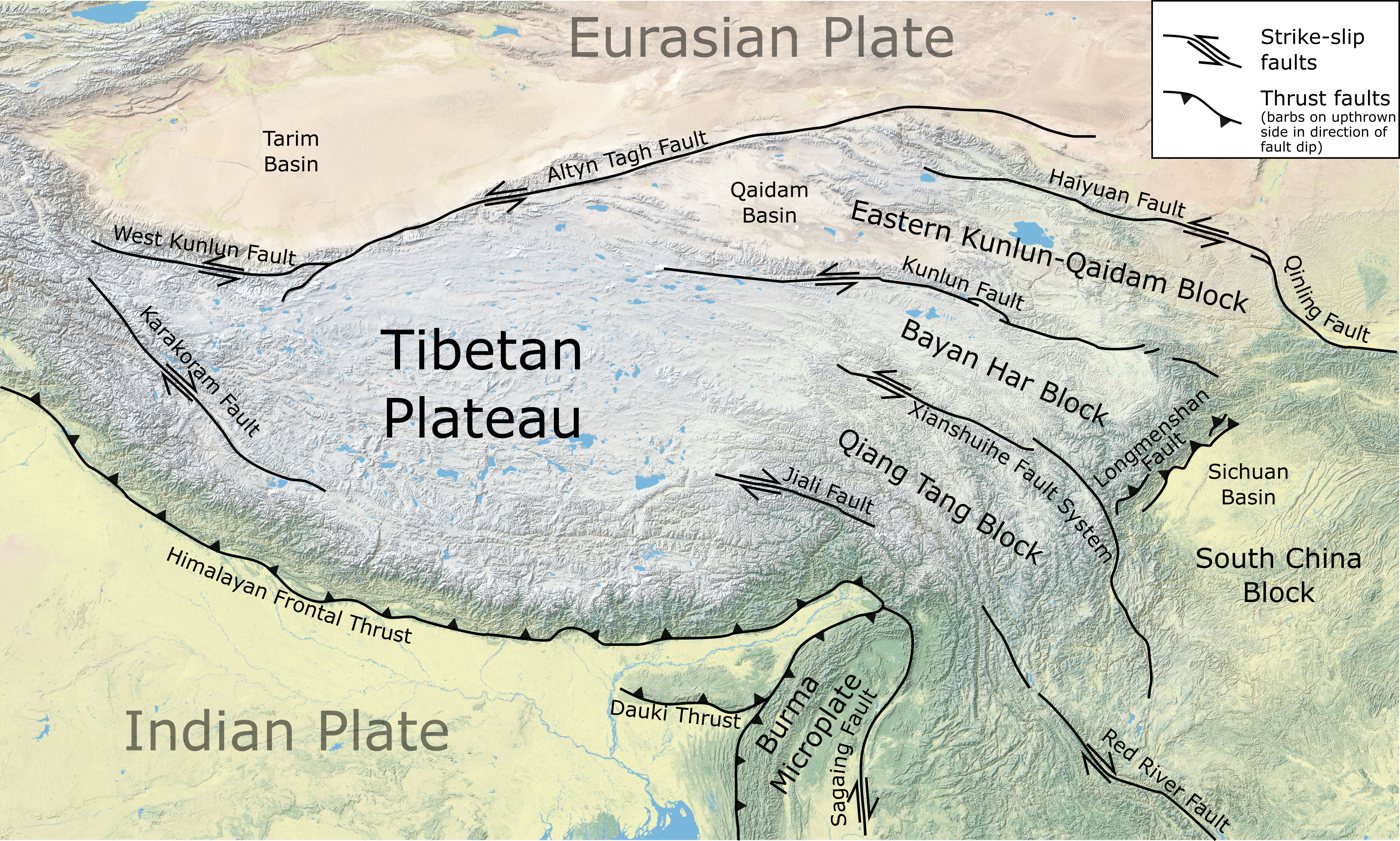
The tectonic overview of the Tibetan Plateau and Sichuan.

Western Sichuan is situated at the edge of the Tibetan Plateau in a vast zone of complex continental deformation caused by the collision of the Indian plate with the Eurasian plate. As thrusting of the Indian plate beneath the Eurasian plate along the Himalayas continues, the continental crust within the Eurasian plate is actively uplifted and thickened, forming the Tibetan Plateau. As there are no active thrust structures within the plateau, compression is accommodated by strike-slip motion along large structures including the Altyn Tagh Fault, Kunlun Fault, Haiyuan Fault and Xianshuihe fault system. Left-lateral strike-slip motion squeezes the crustal blocks of the Tibetan Plateau outwards, forcing it to move eastwards. Meanwhile, the strike-slip motion also results in east–west extension of the plateau, causing normal faults to break within the thickened crust.

The Xianshuihe fault system is a 1,400 km (870 mi) long active left-lateral strike-slip fault that accommodates the strike-slip motion in the Tibetan Plateau. The fault is one of the largest active intracontinental geological structure in the world. Since 1893, at least 350 km (220 mi) of the fault length has ruptured in large successive earthquakes with magnitudes 6.5 or larger. From 1700 to the present-day, the fault has ruptured its entire length during large earthquakes.

== Earthquake ==
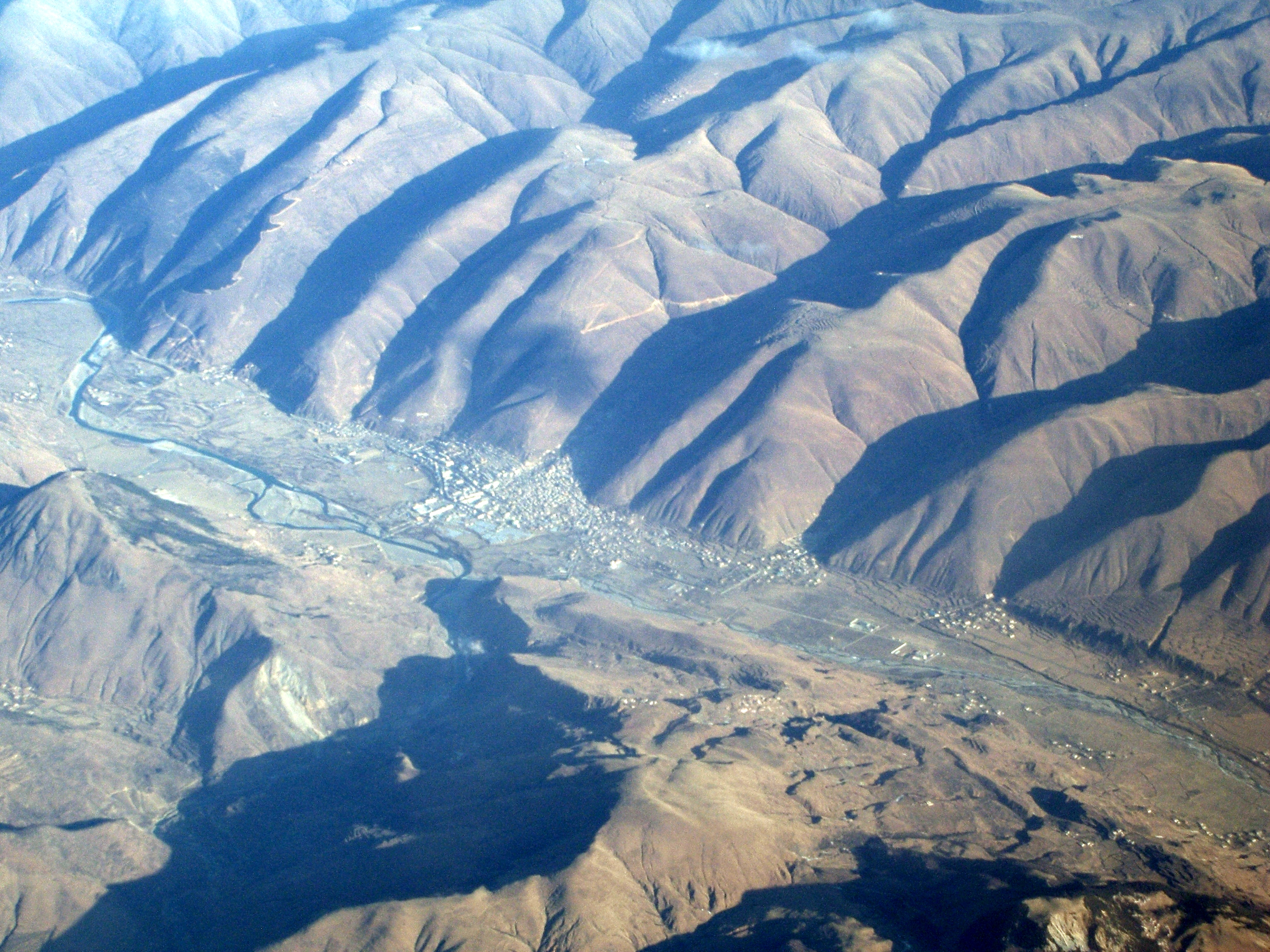
A view from above of the Xianshuihe river valley and fault system.

The earthquake measured 7.9 on the Chinese surface-wave magnitude scale but further analysis and recalculation indicate a magnitude of 7.6. A M_{s} 6.3 aftershock occurred a day later, likely triggered by coulomb stress transfer from the mainshock. Geomorphic evidence of the earthquake was well-preserved because it occurred in mid-winter. This event was the result of pure left-lateral slip on the Luhuo segment of the Xianshuihe fault system. A section of the Xianshuihe fault ruptured for a length of 90 km (56 mi), and produced a maximum slip of 3.8 m (12 ft) on the shallow 0–5 km (0.0–3.1 mi) section of the rupture zone. Near Dandu Township, an agricultural field was offset by 7.2 m (24 ft), but studies indicated that it was the accumulation of offsets from previous earthquakes, including the 1816 event. Surface ruptures were well documented by scientists throughout the 90 km length extending from Renda to Kasu. The southeastern 10 km (6.2 mi) segment of the earthquake rupture overlapped that of the 1923 Renda earthquake, another M_{s} 7.3 earthquake on the Xianshuihe Fault.

The Luhuo segment of the Xianshuihe fault system was also the source of a magnitude 7.5 earthquake in 1816. Field research through trenching at the Luhuo segment however, revealed a record of earthquake history on the fault in the past 3,000 years. The first event identified in the exposed strata layers corresponded to the year 769 BC. Five additional events were also identified to have occurred in the years 318–545 AD, 677–833 AD, and 1008–1444 AD. A recurrence interval has been calculated at between 157 and 1,200 years for the earthquakes from 769 BC–1973 AD.

== Impact ==
The earthquake killed between 2,175 and 2,204 people in Sichuan Province. It also left 43 orphans in the aftermath. It caused extensive destruction along its 90 km (56 mi) of rupture. Nearly homes near or in the path of the rupture were destroyed, amounting to at least 15,700. An estimated 2,867 buildings were also heavily damaged. Across two towns in Luhuo County, 4,600 of the 5,000 homes collapsed while another 880 suffered serious damage. A further 90 sustained cracks. China National Highway 318 or the Sichuan-Tibet highway was damaged by rockfalls, landslides and ground cracks at 17 locations. Other roadways, bridges and telecommunication systems were damaged or disrupted as well. Some 40,427 livestock died and 2.01 million kilograms of food were lost. The earthquake triggered between 40 and 50 landslides in the Xianshui River valley. Nearly all recorded landslide features were distributed within a 70 km (43 mi) by 2 km (1.2 mi), or 409 km^{2} area within the valley. Field surveys observed 137 landslides, all of which lay within the zone of VIII or higher intensity. A division of the People's Liberation Army was sent to the affected area to assist in rescue and recovery efforts. In the division, at least 668 medical crew from 49 groups attended to injured survivors.

== See also ==
- List of earthquakes in 1973
- List of earthquakes in China
- List of earthquakes in Sichuan
