= List of earthquakes in Sichuan =

This is a list of earthquakes that occurred in Sichuan province of China.

== Earthquakes with magnitude of 7.0 or greater ==
Name	Magnitude/M_{s}	Date	Epicenter	Cause
1786 Kangding-Luding earthquake	7.8	1 June 1786	Kangding and Luding County	
2nd 1786 Luding earthquake	7.0	10 June 1786	Luding County in Garzê	
1816 Luhuo earthquake	7.5	1816	Luhuo County in Garzê	
1850 Xichang earthquake	7.5	1850	Xichang in Liangshan Yi Autonomous Prefecture	
1870 Batang earthquake	7.3	1870	Batang in Garzê Tibetan Autonomous Prefecture	
1923 Renda earthquake	7.0	1923	Luhuo County in Garzê	
1933 Diexi earthquake	7.5	1933	Diexi, Mao County	
1948 Litang earthquake	7.2	1948	Litang County	
1955 Kangding earthquake	7.1 or 7.5	1955	Kangding	
1973 Luhuo earthquake	7.9	1973	Luhuo County	
1976 Songpan-Pingwu earthquake	7.2	1976	Songpan County and Pingwu County	
2008 Sichuan earthquake	8.0	12 May 2008	Wenchuan County	Longmenshan Fault
2013 Ya'an earthquake	7.0	20 April 2013	Ya'an	Longmenshan Fault
2017 Jiuzhaigou earthquake	7.0	8 August 2017	Zhangzha Town in the Jiuzhaigou County	

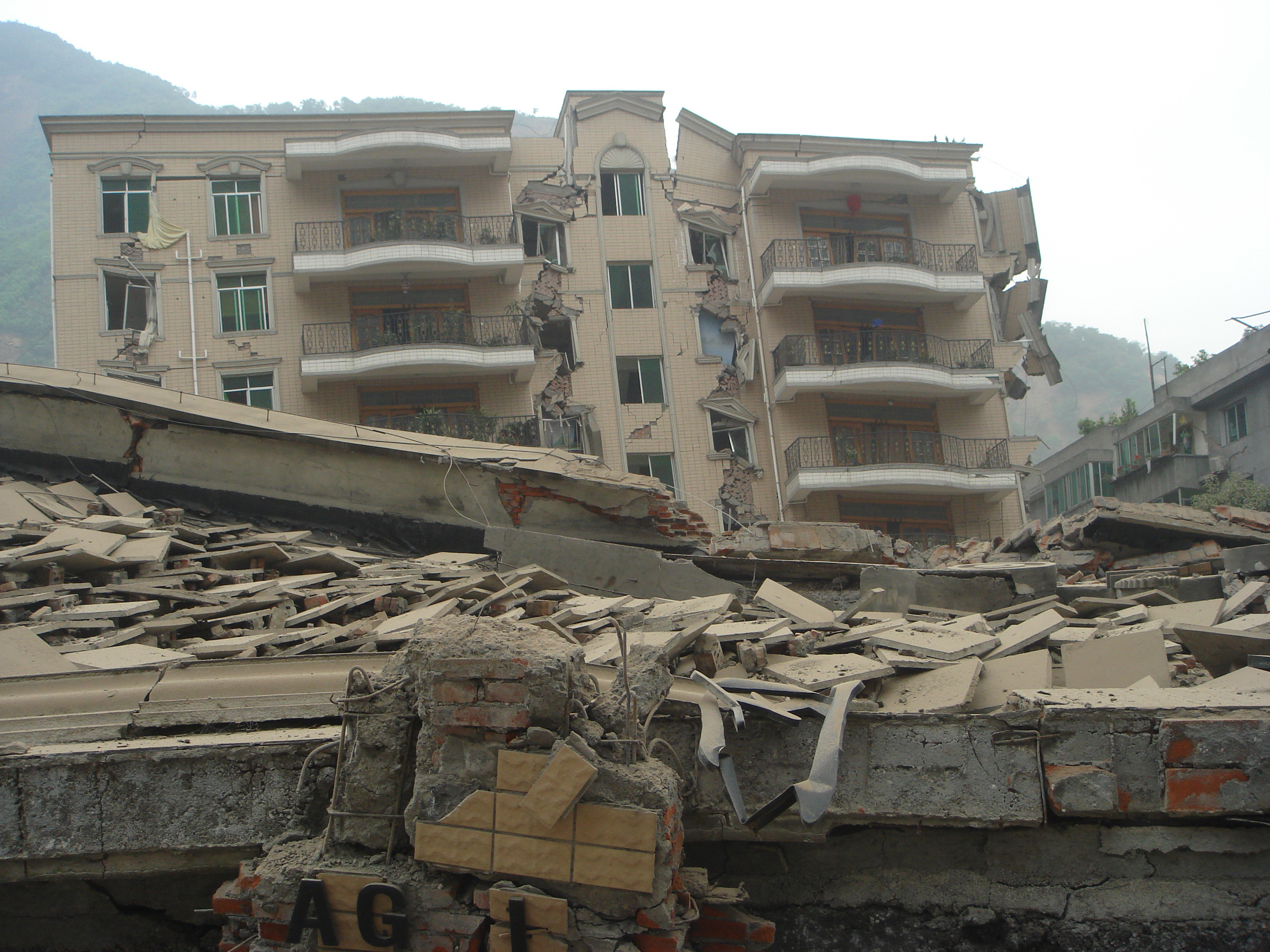
Earthquake damage in Beichuan

== Earthquakes registering magnitudes between 6.0 and 6.9 ==
Name	Magnitude/M_{s}	Date	Epicenter	Cause
Mabian earthquake	6.0	1935	Mabian County	
Huili earthquake	6.75	1955	Huili County and Yuzha Township (魚鮓鄉)	
1975 Dardo Jiulong earthquake	6.2	1975	Kangding and Jiulong County	
1981 Dawu earthquake	6.9	1981	Dawu County	
Garzê earthquake	6.0	1982	Garzê County	
Batang earthquake	6.7	1989	Batang County	
Yajiang earthquake	6.0	2001	Yajiang County	
2008 Panzhihua earthquake	6.1	30 August 2008	Panzhihua	
2014 Kangding earthquake	6.3	22 November 2014	Kangding	
2019 Changning earthquake	6.0	17 June 2019	Changning County	
2021 Luxian earthquake	6.0	16 September 2021	Lu County	
2022 Ya'an earthquake	6.1	1 June 2022	Ya'an	Longmenshan Fault
2022 Luding earthquake	6.6	5 September 2022	Luding County	Xianshuihe fault system

== See also ==
- List of earthquakes in Yunnan
- 2019 Zigong Earthquake
