= 1870 Batang earthquake =

Earthquake in China

- Location within China
- Local date: April 11, 1870
- Magnitude: M_{w} 7.3
- Epicenter: 30.0°N 99.1°E
- Type: Strike-slip
- Areas affected: Sichuan, Qing dynasty
- Max. intensity: MMI X (Extreme)
- Landslides: Yes
- Casualties: 2,300–5,000 dead

On April 11, 1870, a moment magnitude 7.3 earthquake struck Batang County in Sichuan, China. The earthquake had a maximum Modified Mercalli intensity of X (Extreme). The earthquake and a large fire resulted in between 2,300 and 5,000 fatalities.

== Tectonic setting ==
Sichuan is located at the edge of the Tibetan Plateau, a portion of the continental crust within the Eurasian Plate that was thickened and uplifted by the India–Asia collision. Deformation of the Eurasian Plate within the collision zone is accommodated by active thrust and left-lateral faulting. A great portion of strike-slip deformation is accommodated along the Altyn Tagh, Kunlun, Haiyuan and Xianshuihe fault systems.

== Earthquake ==
The earthquake occurred as a result of right-lateral strike-slip faulting along the Batang Fault. The Batang Fault is an active northeast–southwest trending strike-slip fault. Seismicity has been recognized on the fault since the Holocene. An annual slip rate of 3–4 mm was indicated by GPS observations. Earthquakes on the fault have a recurrence interval of 700 years. Recent earthquakes on the fault include a M_{s} 6.7 in 1989 and a 5.5 in 1996. The earthquake was misdated to 1868 or 1869 by William Mesny. It was also misdated to 1871.

== Damage ==
The earthquake triggered large landslides that were mainly concentrated around the epicenter area. Steep mountain slopes fell into a river, forming dams. The earthquake itself reportedly killed 1,000 people in the town of Batang. Many temples collapsed and about 90 percent of wood infrastructures were destroyed. A large number of residents were buried under collapsed buildings. A conflagration was triggered, resulting in a further 4,000 deaths. Intensities VIII to X was felt along the fault trace in a northeast–southwest orientation.

== See also ==
- List of earthquakes in China
- List of earthquakes in Sichuan
