= 1786 Kangding-Luding earthquake =

Magnitude 7 earthquake (1 June 1786) around Kangding, Sichuan province, China

- Location within Sichuan Location within China
- Local date: 1 June 1786
- Local time: Midday
- Magnitude: 7.75 M_{w}
- Depth: 20 km (12 mi)
- Epicenter: 29.9°N 102.0°E
- Areas affected: Sichuan, Qing dynasty China
- Max. intensity: MMI X (Extreme)
- Landslides: Many
- Casualties: 435 from the earthquake and about 100,000 from the failure of the landslide dam

An earthquake occurred on 1 June 1786 in and around Kangding, in what is now China's Sichuan province. It had an estimated magnitude of about 7.75 and a maximum perceived intensity of X (Extreme) on the Mercalli intensity scale. The initial quake killed 435 people. After an aftershock nine days later, a further 100,000 died when a landslide dam collapsed across the Dadu River.

== Tectonic setting ==
Sichuan lies within the complex zone of deformation associated with the continuing collision between the India Plate and the Eurasian plate. The thickened crust of the Tibetan Plateau is spreading to the east causing the southward motion of the Sichuan-Yunnan block. The eastern side of this block is bounded by the Xianshuihe fault system, a major left lateral strike-slip fault zone. Movement on this fault zone has been responsible for many major damaging earthquakes, such as the 1981 Dawu earthquake.

== Earthquake ==
An isoseismal map constructed for this earthquake shows that the zone of maximum shaking was elongated in a northwest–southeast direction, parallel to the trace of the Xianshuihe Fault. The magnitude of 7.5–8.0 has been estimated from the extent of the intensity VIII (Severe) zone. Remote sensing techniques, backed up by a field survey, identified a 70-kilometre (43 mi) long zone of surface fault rupture thought to be associated with the earthquake. The active fault segment has been identified as the Moxi Fault.

== Landslide dam ==
The earthquake triggered numerous landslides, one of which blocked the Dadu River, forming a temporary lake. The dam was about 70 metres (230 ft) high, holding back an estimated water volume of about 50 million m^{3} (65 million yd^{3}). By 9 June the lake had started to flow over the dam and an aftershock on 10 June caused the dam to collapse suddenly, releasing the impounded water and devastating areas downstream. It is the second-deadliest landslide disaster on record, after the 1920 Haiyuan earthquake.

== Damage ==
The earthquake caused widespread damage in the epicentral area. The city walls at Kangding collapsed and severe damage to many houses and government buildings caused 250 casualties. In Luding County 181 people were killed in collapsed buildings. At both Qingxi and Yuexi, parts of the city walls were destroyed and many buildings were severely damaged, causing further casualties.

The flood that resulted from the landslide dam failure reached the city of Leshan on 11 June, causing collapse of part of the city walls. Spectators who had gathered to watch the flood from the walls were thrown into the water. The destructive effects of the flood continued downstream at Yibin and Luzhou, with an estimated 100,000 people being killed overall. Local residents made a memorial tablet, describing these events, which is now kept at the Seismological Office in Luding.

== See also ==
- List of earthquakes in China
- List of earthquakes in Sichuan
- List of historical earthquakes
