= Xindu (disambiguation) =

Xindu may refer to the following locations in China:

- Xindu District (新都区), Chengdu
- Xindu, Putian (新度镇), town in Licheng District, Putian, Fujian
- Xindu, Garzê, town in Garzê Prefecture, Sichuan
