= Danba County =

Danba County 丹巴县 · རོང་བྲག་རྫོང་། Rongzhag
- County
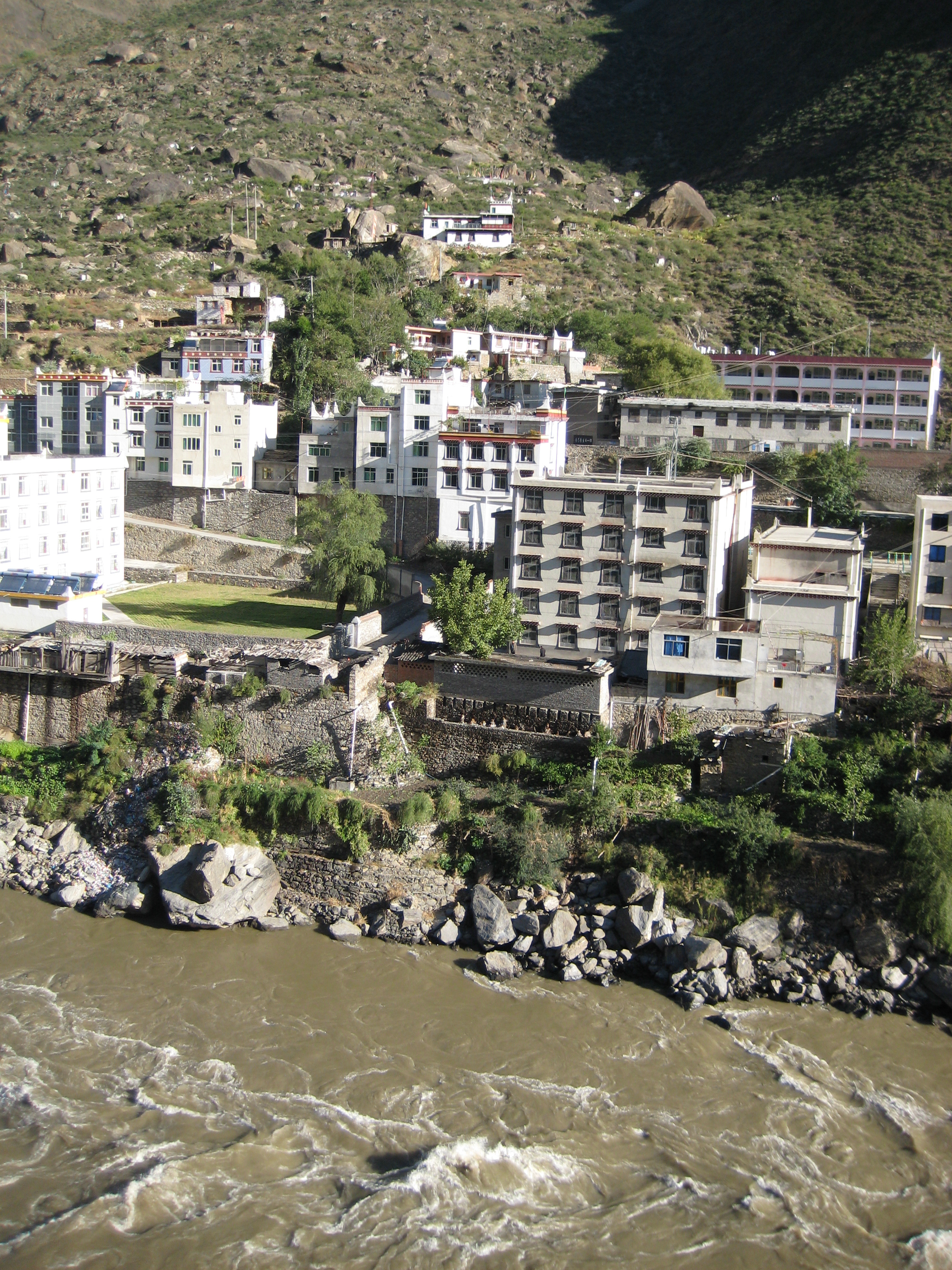
- The county seat

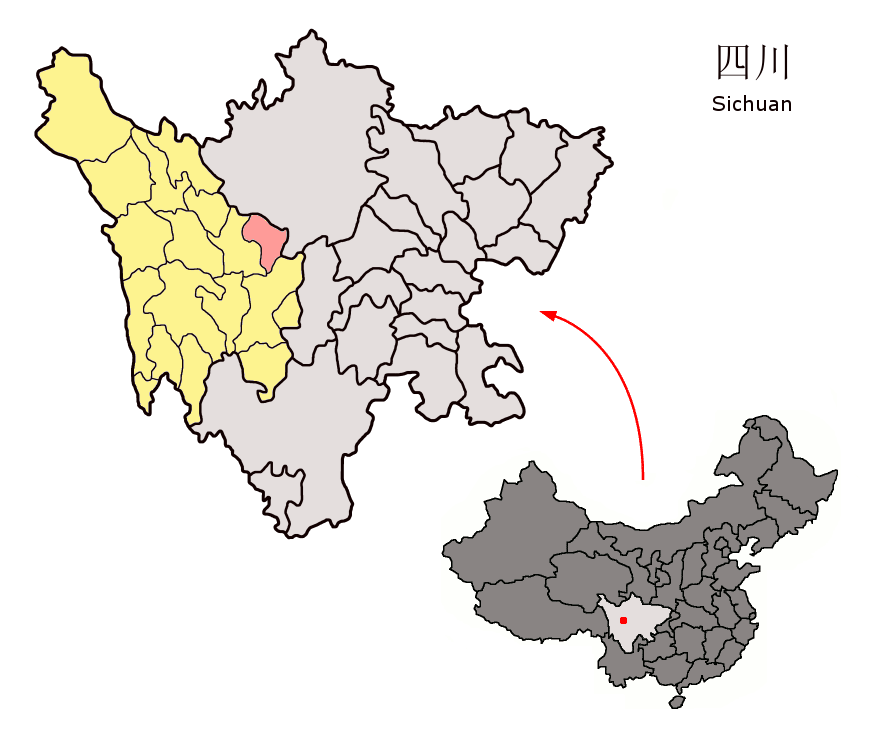
- Location of Danba County (red) within Garzê Prefecture (yellow) and Sichuan.

- Location of the seat in Sichuan Danba (China)
- Coordinates: 30°57′N 101°51′E
- Country: China
- Province: Sichuan
- Autonomous prefecture: Garzê
- Township-level divisions: 1 town 14 townships
- County seat: Chaggo

Area
  - Total: 4,656 km^{2} (1,798 sq mi)
- Elevation: 1,799 m (5,902 ft)

Population (2020)
  - Total: 49,872
  - Density: 10.71/km^{2} (27.74/sq mi)
- Time zone: UTC+8 (China Standard)

Danba County

Chinese name
- Simplified Chinese: 丹巴县
- Traditional Chinese: 丹巴縣
Transcriptions
Standard Mandarin
- Hanyu Pinyin: Dānbā Xiàn

Tibetan name
- Tibetan: རོང་བྲག་རྫོང་།
Transcriptions
- Wylie: rong brag rdzong
- Tibetan Pinyin: Rongzhag Zong

Rongzhag (Tibetan: རོང་བྲག, ZWPY: Rongzhag Zong), also Danba (Chinese: 丹巴; pinyin: Dānbā) is a county of the eastern Garzê Tibetan Autonomous Prefecture in western Sichuan Province, China. The county seat is the town of Chaggo.

== Governance ==
Law enforcement in the county is provided by the Danba County Public Security Bureau. It contains one traffic police unit and a police post in Gya'gyü Town.

The People's Armed Police Danba County Company provides paramilitary law enforcement and disaster relief in the county.

Firefighting and rescue duties in the county are provided by the Danba County Fire and Rescue Battalion.

== Administrative divisions ==
Rongzhag County is divided into 9 towns and 2 townships:

Name	Simplified Chinese	Hanyu Pinyin	Tibetan	Wylie	Administrative division code
Towns
Chaggo Town (Zhaggo, Zhanggu)	章谷镇	Zhānggǔ Zhèn	བྲག་འགོ་གྲོང་རྡལ།	brag 'go grong rdal	513323100
Trateng Town (Chagdêng, Pagdêng, Badi)	巴底镇	Bādǐ Zhèn	བྲག་སྟེང་གྲོང་རྡལ།	brag steng grong rdal	513323101
Geshitsa Town (Gêxêcha, Geshizha, Geshiza)	革什扎镇	Géshízhā Zhèn	དགེ་བཤེས་གྲྭ་གྲོང་རྡལ།	dge bshes grwa grong rdal	513323102
Donggu Town	东谷镇	Dōnggǔ Zhèn	སྟོང་དགུ་གྲོང་རྡལ།	stong dgu grong rdal	513323103
Mudori Town (Mo'erduo)	墨尔多山镇	Mò'ěrduōshān Zhèn	དམུ་རྡོ་རི་གྲོང་རྡལ།	dmu rdo ri grong rdal	513323104
Gya'gyü Town (Jiaju)	甲居镇	Jiǎjū Zhèn	བརྒྱ་བརྒྱུད་གྲོང་རྡལ།	brgya brgyud grong rdal	513323105
Guzong Town (Gêxê, Gezong)	格宗镇	Gézōng Zhèn	དགུ་རྫོང་གྲོང་རྡལ།	dgu rdzong grong rdal	513323106
Golung Town (Banshanmen)	半扇门镇	Bànshànmén Zhèn	སྒོ་ལུང་གྲོང་རྡལ།	sgo lung grong rdal	513323107
Dando Town (Dandong)	丹东镇	Dāndōng Zhèn	མདའ་མདོ་གྲོང་རྡལ།	mda' mdo grong rdal	513323108
Townships
Bawang Township	巴旺乡	Bāwàng Xiāng	དཔའ་དབང་ཤང་།	dpa' dbang shang	513323201
Sogbo Township (Suopo)	梭坡乡	Suōpō Xiāng	སོག་པོ་ཤང་།	sog po shang	513323209
Qugsug Township (Taipingqiao)	太平桥乡	Tàipíngqiáo Xiāng	ཕྱུག་ཟུག་ཤང་།	phyug zug shang	513323213

== National Priority Protected Sites ==
Danba County is home to two National Priority Protected Sites:

- Danba County ancient stone towers, added in 2006 as part of the 6th Batch of National Priorty Protected Sites
- Han'eyi neolithic relics and Han tombs, added in 2013 as part of the 7th Batch of National Priority Protected Sites

== Climate ==
Climate data for Danba, elevation 1,950 m (6,400 ft), (1991–2020 normals, extremes 1981–present)
Month	Jan	Feb	Mar	Apr	May	Jun	Jul	Aug	Sep	Oct	Nov	Dec	Year
Record high °C (°F)	23.2 (73.8)	28.8 (83.8)	33.5 (92.3)	36.5 (97.7)	36.8 (98.2)	37.2 (99.0)	37.7 (99.9)	39.0 (102.2)	35.4 (95.7)	32.2 (90.0)	25.3 (77.5)	19.2 (66.6)	39.0 (102.2)
Mean daily maximum °C (°F)	11.5 (52.7)	15.6 (60.1)	20.2 (68.4)	24.3 (75.7)	26.5 (79.7)	27.3 (81.1)	29.1 (84.4)	29.5 (85.1)	25.8 (78.4)	21.2 (70.2)	17.0 (62.6)	11.9 (53.4)	21.7 (71.0)
Daily mean °C (°F)	4.8 (40.6)	8.2 (46.8)	12.3 (54.1)	16.1 (61.0)	18.7 (65.7)	20.2 (68.4)	21.9 (71.4)	22.2 (72.0)	19.1 (66.4)	14.8 (58.6)	9.8 (49.6)	5.3 (41.5)	14.5 (58.0)
Mean daily minimum °C (°F)	−0.9 (30.4)	2.2 (36.0)	6.3 (43.3)	9.9 (49.8)	12.9 (55.2)	15.3 (59.5)	17.1 (62.8)	17.2 (63.0)	14.6 (58.3)	10.3 (50.5)	4.4 (39.9)	−0.3 (31.5)	9.1 (48.4)
Record low °C (°F)	−7.0 (19.4)	−5.2 (22.6)	−3.4 (25.9)	2.3 (36.1)	4.7 (40.5)	8.4 (47.1)	10.8 (51.4)	10.1 (50.2)	7.3 (45.1)	1.9 (35.4)	−3.4 (25.9)	−7.2 (19.0)	−7.2 (19.0)
Average precipitation mm (inches)	0.8 (0.03)	2.0 (0.08)	14.5 (0.57)	45.4 (1.79)	86.8 (3.42)	136.3 (5.37)	106.5 (4.19)	86.1 (3.39)	103.4 (4.07)	48.8 (1.92)	6.6 (0.26)	1.0 (0.04)	638.2 (25.13)
Average precipitation days (≥ 0.1 mm)	1.1	1.8	6.4	11.9	18.1	22.2	18.6	15.5	17.5	13.5	3.9	0.8	131.3
Average snowy days	1.7	1.3	0.6	0	0	0	0	0	0	0	0.1	0.5	4.2
Average relative humidity (%)	43	40	41	46	53	65	66	61	65	62	54	48	54
Mean monthly sunshine hours	154.5	164.2	196.2	203.8	204.3	165.9	172.2	179.0	165.5	174.0	158.3	139.1	2,077
Percentage possible sunshine	48	52	52	52	48	39	40	44	45	50	50	44	47
Source: China Meteorological Administration All-time Oct high
