= 1955 Alexandria earthquake =

Earthquake affecting Egypt

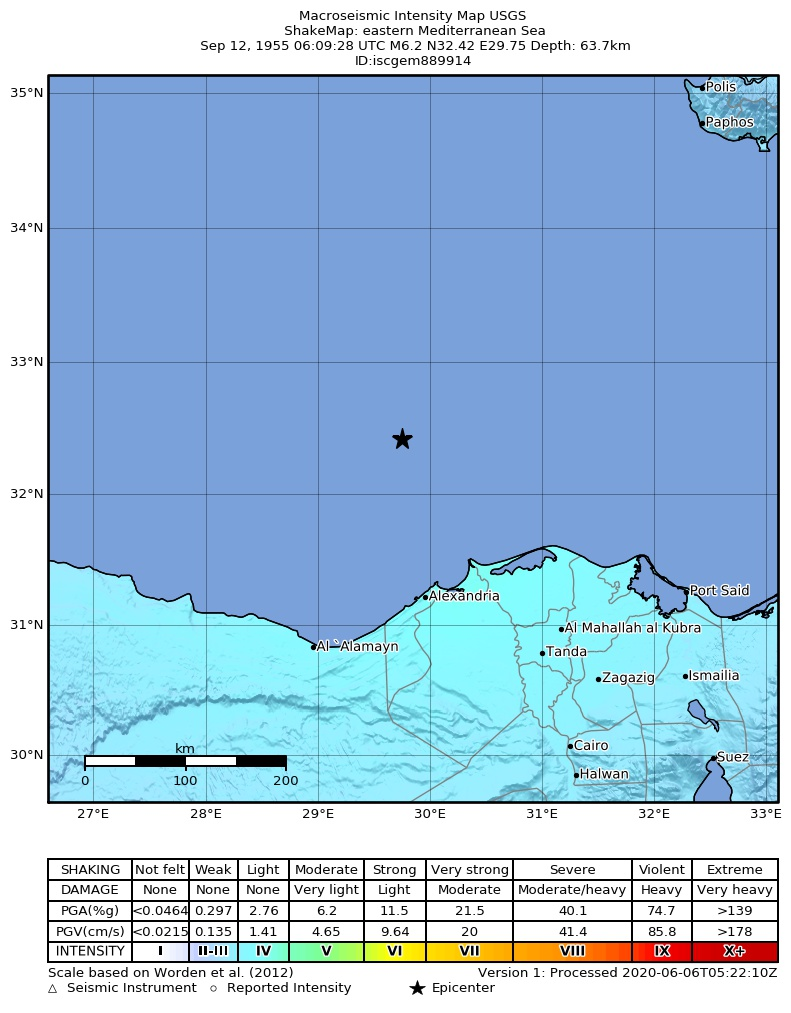
- USGS ShakeMap

- Location within Mediterranean
- UTC time: 1955-09-12 06:09:28
- ISC event: 889914
- USGS-ANSS: ComCat
- Local date: September 12, 1955
- Local time: 08:09:28
- Magnitude: M_{s} 6.3
- Depth: 25 km
- Epicenter: 32.2°N 29.6°E
- Areas affected: Egypt
- Casualties: 18 deaths, 89 injuries

The 1955 Alexandria earthquake occurred on September 12 at 06:09 UTC. The epicenter was located in the eastern Mediterranean, offshore of Alexandria, Egypt. The earthquake had a magnitude of M_{s} 6.3.

Damage was reported in the Nile Delta between Alexandria and Cairo. About 300 adobe houses were badly damaged around Lake Idku. The earthquake caused 18 deaths and 89 injuries, with 40 houses completely collapsed and about 420 houses ruined. The earthquake could also be felt in Cyprus, Palestine, Syria, and Greece.

== See also ==
- List of earthquakes in 1955
- List of earthquakes in Egypt
