= 1733 Dongchuan earthquake =

7.75 Ms earthquake in Yunnan, China

- Location within China
- Local date: August 2, 1733
- Magnitude: M_{s} 7.75
- Epicenter: 26.2°N 103.1°E
- Areas affected: Yunnan, China
- Max. intensity: MMI X (Extreme)
- Casualties: Dozens

The 1733 Dongchuan earthquake affected Yunnan in China on August 2. The earthquake, which had an estimated surface-wave magnitude of 7.75, damaged homes across the province. There were dozens of fatalities and more deaths occurred in mines. The earthquake was the result of faulting along the Xiaojiang Fault Zone.

== Geology ==
The Xianshuihe-Xiaojiang Fault is a major sinistral strike-slip fault system in China that runs along the southeastern edge of the Tibetan Plateau. It comprises the Xianshuihe, Anninghe-Zemuhe, Xiaojiang and Daliangshan faults. The Xiaojiang Fault Zone represents the southeastern part of the Sichuan–Yunnan tectonic block's eastern boundary. The Sichuan–Yunnan block's southwestern margin is represented by the Jinshajiang and Red River faults. The Xiaojiang Fault Zone is seismically active, having been associated with over ten earthquakes greater than magnitude 6.0 since 1500. This includes a M_{s} 8.0 earthquake in 1833.

== Earthquake ==
The earthquake produced an 82 km (51 mi) surface rupture along the eastern segment of the northern Xiaojiang Fault Zone. It extended north–south from Shiliping to Tianba. It was also associated with a depression about 2–3 km (1.2–1.9 mi) long and 200–300 m (660–980 ft) across, bounded by vertical escarpments measuring 5–10 m (16–33 ft). Approximately 9 m (30 ft) of sinistral offset represented the largest strike-slip displacement from the earthquake. Vertical offsets were exclusively recorded south of the Dongchuan basin. Earthquakes of such magnitudes have an average return interval of 2,000 to 3,000 years.

== Impact ==
In Qiaojia, 16 civilians were killed by rockfalls when the town was destroyed. In a military camp, 50 soldiers escaped unhurt while one soldier died from a toppled beam at another campsite. Cui Naiyong, an official in Dongchuan, said about 40 people died in the larger towns of Bigu, Awang and Xiaojiang. He added that most homes, constructed of wood, rarely killed their inhabitants when they collapsed. In the Tangdan mines near Bigu, Cui reported a staggering death toll as each of the several hundred mines contained hundreds and thousands of workers at the time of the earthquake. These mines likely collapsed, killing those inside. Only a handful of people managed to escape from the mines. At Huize, temples and administrative buildings were razed, nearly all fortification along the north and south city walls were destroyed. Forty percent of the battlements on the eastern and western part of the city were also destroyed. Landslides at Mushulang dammed the Yinghe River for three days.

== See also ==
- List of earthquakes in China
- List of earthquakes in Yunnan
- List of historical earthquakes
