= Xianshui River =

River in Garzê, Sichuan, China

Coordinates: 30.2053°N 101.0073°E

Xianshui River (Chinese: 鲜水河; pinyin: Xiānshuǐ Hé) — a river in Sichuan province, southern China.

== Geography ==
The Xianshui River has three river sources, the Da-chu river (Chinese characters:达曲) and Nyi-chu river (Chinese characters:泥曲). After the confluence of the two rivers in Luhuo, the name becomes the Xianshui River.

A dam and hydroelectric plant on it in Luhuo was completed in 2009.

Yangtze River

The Xianshui River flows into the Yalong River at Yajiang. Via the Yalong River confluence, the Xianshui is a tributary of the Yangtze River (Chang Jiang).

== See also ==
- Xianshuihe fault system
- Index: Tributaries of the Yangtze River
