= List of earthquakes in 1955 =

Earthquakes in 1955
Approximate epicenters of the earthquakes in 1955
- 4.0–5.9 magnitude
- 6.0–6.9 magnitude
- 7.0–7.9 magnitude
- 8.0+ magnitude
- Strongest: New Zealand, Kermadec Islands (Magnitude 7.5) February 27
- Deadliest: Philippines, western Mindanao (Magnitude 7.4) March 31 400 deaths
- Total fatalities: 504

Number by magnitude
- 9.0+: 0

This is a list of earthquakes in 1955. Only magnitude 6.0 or greater earthquakes appear on the list. Lower magnitude events are included if they have caused death, injury or damage. Events which occurred in remote areas will be excluded from the list as they wouldn't have generated significant media interest. All dates are listed according to UTC time. This was somewhat a year of contrast. The number of magnitude 7.0+ quakes was up on the previous year. The largest quake only reached 7.5 in magnitude. The death toll during the year was relatively low with most of the 504 deaths coming in the Philippines in March. Four-hundred died in the quake which struck Mindanao. Other deadly events struck most notably China and Egypt.

== Overall ==
=== By death toll ===
Rank	Death toll	Magnitude	Location	MMI	Depth (km)	Date
1	400	7.4	Philippines, western Mindanao	VIII (Severe)	35.0	March 31
2	39	7.1	China, Sichuan Province	IX (Violent)	10.0	April 14
3	22	6.2	Egypt off north coast of Egypt	IV (Light)	63.7	September 12
4	12	6.0	Pakistan, north of Quetta	VI (Strong)	15.0	February 18
5	10	5.8	Costa Rica, Alajuela Province	VI (Strong)	15.0	September 1

- Note: At least 10 casualties

=== By magnitude ===
Rank	Magnitude	Death toll	Location	MMI	Depth (km)	Date
1	7.5	0	New Zealand, Kermadec Islands	( )	15.0	February 27
2	7.4	400	Philippines, western Mindanao	VIII (Severe)	35.0	March 31
3	7.3	0	Australia, south of New Ireland (island), Papua and New Guinea	VII (Very strong)	20.0	October 10
= 4	7.2	0	Soviet Union, off the east coast of Kamchatka, Russia	VII (Very strong)	59.2	March 18
= 4	7.2	0	Japan, Volcano Islands	( )	558.9	May 30
5	7.1	39	China, Sichuan Province	IX (Violent)	10.0	April 14
= 6	7.0	0	New Zealand, Auckland Islands	( )	15.0	January 5
= 6	7.0	0	United States, Andreanof Islands, Alaska	( )	100.0	March 14
= 6	7.0	0	southern Indian Ocean	( )	20.0	March 22
= 6	7.0	1	Chile, off the coast of Coquimbo Region	VII (Very strong)	15.0	April 19
= 6	7.0	0	India, southern Great Nicobar	VII (Very strong)	25.3	May 17
= 6	7.0	0	Australia, Bougainville Island, Papua and New Guinea	( )	179.2	August 16

- Note: At least 7.0 magnitude

== Notable events ==
=== January ===
January
- Strongest: 7.0 M_{w} New Zealand
- Total fatalities: 0

Number by magnitude
- 8.0–8.9: 0
- 7.0–7.9: 1
- 6.0–6.9: 9

Date	Country and location	M_{w}	Depth (km)	MMI	Notes	Casualties	
Date	Country and location	M_{w}	Depth (km)	MMI	Notes	Dead	Injured
3	Peru, off the coast of central	6.1	25.0	V			
5	New Zealand, Auckland Islands	7.0	15.0				
5	New Hebrides, Vanuatu	6.6	15.0	rowspan="2"| Doublet earthquake.			
5	New Hebrides, Vanuatu	6.5	15.0	VI			
6	New Hebrides, Vanuatu	6.2	35.0	VI	Aftershock.		
8	United Kingdom, Santa Cruz Islands, Solomon Islands	6.6	62.7				
13	United States, Fox Islands (Alaska)	6.8	17.6				
13	United States, Fox Islands (Alaska)	6.5	40.0		Aftershock.		
28	China, western Xizang Province	6.5	35.0	VII			
31	Brazil, Mato Grosso	6.3	15.0	VII			

=== February ===
February
- Strongest: 7.5 M_{w} New Zealand
- Deadliest: 6.0 M_{w} Pakistan; 12 deaths
- Total fatalities: 12

Number by magnitude
- 8.0–8.9: 0
- 7.0–7.9: 1
- 6.0–6.9: 4

Date	Country and location	M_{w}	Depth (km)	MMI	Notes	Casualties	
Date	Country and location	M_{w}	Depth (km)	MMI	Notes	Dead	Injured
1	Japan, south of Hokkaido	6.0	55.0	V			
15	New Hebrides, Vanuatu	6.2	65.0	rowspan="2"| Doublet earthquake.			
15	New Hebrides, Vanuatu	6.1	65.0	V			
18	Pakistan, north of Quetta	6.0	15.0	VI	12 people were killed and more than 100 were hurt. Some damage was caused.	12	100+
27	New Zealand, Kermadec Islands	7.5	15.0				

=== March ===
March
- Strongest: 7.4 M_{w} Philippines
- Deadliest: 7.4 M_{w} Philippines; 400 deaths
- Total fatalities: 400

Number by magnitude
- 8.0–8.9: 0
- 7.0–7.9: 4
- 6.0–6.9: 8

Date	Country and location	M_{w}	Depth (km)	MMI	Notes	Casualties	
Date	Country and location	M_{w}	Depth (km)	MMI	Notes	Dead	Injured
1	Canada, northern Yukon Territory	6.3	10.0				
6	Indonesia, off the west coast of southern Sumatra	6.1	38.3				
6	Philippines, off the southwest coast of Negros (island)	6.1	15.0	rowspan="2"| Doublet earthquake.			
6	Philippines, southwest Negros (island)	6.3	15.0	VII			
6	Tajik Soviet Socialist Republic, Gorno-Badakhshan Autonomous Region	6.3	124.9	V			
14	United States, Andreanof Islands, Alaska	7.0	100.0				
18	Soviet Union, off the east coast of Kamchatka, Russia	7.2	59.2	VII			
22	Burma, Kachin State	6.0	60.0	V			
22	southern Indian Ocean	7.0	20.0				
28	Japan, Ryukyu Islands	6.3	51.0				
31	Philippines, western Mindanao	7.4	35.0	VIII	During the 1955 Lanao earthquake, 400 people were killed and property damage costs were $5 million (1955 rate).	400	
31	Philippines, western Mindanao	6.3	35.0	VI	Aftershock.		

=== April ===
April
- Strongest: 7.1 M_{w} China
- Deadliest: 7.1 M_{w} China; 39 deaths
- Total fatalities: 55

Number by magnitude
- 8.0–8.9: 0
- 7.0–7.9: 2
- 6.0–6.9: 16
- 5.0–5.9: 2

Date	Country and location	M_{w}	Depth (km)	MMI	Notes	Casualties	
Date	Country and location	M_{w}	Depth (km)	MMI	Notes	Dead	Injured
4	Taiwan, south of	6.5	25.0	VI			
4	Nicaragua, León Department	6.2	15.0	VII	Some damage was reported.		
5	Mexico, Gulf of California	6.5	15.0	VI			
5	Mexico, Gulf of California	6.0	15.0	V	Aftershock.		
10	Philippines, western Mindanao	6.3	15.0	VI	Aftershock.		
13	Greece, Peloponnese (region)	5.6	25.0	VI	Some damage was caused.		
14	China, western Sichuan Province	7.1	10.0	IX	39 people were killed and 113 were injured in the 1955 Zheduotang earthquake. 500 homes were destroyed.	39	113
15	China, southern Xinjiang Province	6.9	20.0	rowspan="2"| Some homes were destroyed. Doublet earthquake.			
15	China, southern Xinjiang Province	6.9	20.0	VII			
17	Soviet Union, off the east coast of Kamchatka, Russia	6.5	28.5				
19	Greece, Thessaly	6.2	15.0	X	8 people were killed and 149 were injured. 459 homes were destroyed and 8,352 were damaged.	8	149
19	Chile, off the coast of Coquimbo Region	7.0	15.0	VII	1 person drowned due to a tsunami hitting the coast. A few homes were destroyed.	1	
20	Chile, off the coast of Coquimbo Region	6.1	25.0	VI	Aftershock.		
20	Chile, off the coast of Coquimbo Region	6.3	15.0	V	Aftershock.		
21	Greece, Thessaly	5.9	15.0	X	7 people were killed and major damage was caused.	7	
22	Soviet Union, Kuril Islands, Russia	6.5	114.9				
24	China, northern Xinjiang Province	6.3	15.0	VII	A few homes were destroyed.		
26	El Salvador, off the coast of	6.1	50.0	V			
28	United States, Andreanof Islands, Alaska	6.4	35.0	IV			
30	Nicaragua, Managua Department	6.0	15.0	VII			

=== May ===
May
- Strongest: 7.2 M_{w} Japan
- Total fatalities: 0

Number by magnitude
- 8.0–8.9: 0
- 7.0–7.9: 2
- 6.0–6.9: 9

Date	Country and location	M_{w}	Depth (km)	MMI	Notes	Casualties	
Date	Country and location	M_{w}	Depth (km)	MMI	Notes	Dead	Injured
1	Japan, off the east coast of Honshu	6.6	10.0				
11	Ecuador, Napo Province	6.5	15.0	VII			
11	Philippines, Babuyan Islands	6.0	0.0		Unknown depth.		
14	Japan, Bonin Islands	6.7	487.0				
17	India, southern Great Nicobar	7.0	25.3	VII			
26	United Kingdom, southeast Guadalcanal, Solomon Islands	6.3	40.0	VI			
28	Argentina, Cordoba Province, Argentina	6.5	179.4				
30	Japan, Volcano Islands	7.2	558.9				
30	Indonesia, Papua (province)	6.3	55.0	VI			
31	New Zealand, Kermadec Islands	6.8	155.0				
31	Japan, south of Hokkaido	6.0	95.0				

=== June ===
June
- Strongest: 6.7 M_{w} United States 2 events
- Total fatalities: 0

Number by magnitude
- 8.0–8.9: 0
- 7.0–7.9: 0
- 6.0–6.9: 10

Date	Country and location	M_{w}	Depth (km)	MMI	Notes	Casualties	
Date	Country and location	M_{w}	Depth (km)	MMI	Notes	Dead	Injured
2	United States, Andreanof Islands, Alaska	6.7	20.0				
4	Japan, off the east coast of Honshu	6.2	36.5	rowspan="2"| Doublet earthquake			
4	Japan, off the east coast of Honshu	6.1	30.0				
5	Taiwan, Nantou County	6.2	35.0	V			
7	China, Yunnan Province	6.2	15.0	VIII	4,524 homes were destroyed.		
14	Mexico, off the coast of Jalisco	6.5	15.0				
14	Japan, off the east coast of Honshu	6.1	30.0				
17	Taiwan, off the southeast coast	6.2	30.0	V			
20	United States, Andreanof Islands, Alaska	6.7	30.4				
27	China, India, Xizang Province, Jammu and Kashmir (union territory)	6.2	15.0	VI			

=== July ===
July
- Strongest: 6.8 M_{w} Peru
- Deadliest: 6.6 M_{w} Turkey; 4 deaths
- Total fatalities: 4

Number by magnitude
- 8.0–8.9: 0
- 7.0–7.9: 0
- 6.0–6.9: 10

Date	Country and location	M_{w}	Depth (km)	MMI	Notes	Casualties	
Date	Country and location	M_{w}	Depth (km)	MMI	Notes	Dead	Injured
6	Soviet Union, off the east coast of Kamchatka, Russia	6.2	52.1	V			
10	Tonga	6.1	15.0				
16	Turkey, Aydin Province	6.6	15.0	IX	4 people were killed and major damage was reported.	4	
20	Ecuador, Imbabura Province	6.0	15.0	VII	Substantial damage was reported.		
21	Peru, Arequipa Region	6.8	88.6				
23	Indonesia, Barat Daya Islands	6.5	35.0	V			
23	Philippines, west of Negros (island)	6.1	15.0	VII			
24	Taiwan, off the east coast	6.1	15.0	V			
27	Japan, Tokushima Prefecture, Shikoku	6.3	15.0	VII			
28	Chile, Los Lagos Region	6.1	15.0	VII			

=== August ===
August
- Strongest: 7.0 M_{w} Australia
- Total fatalities: 0

Number by magnitude
- 8.0–8.9: 0
- 7.0–7.9: 1
- 6.0–6.9: 3

Date	Country and location	M_{w}	Depth (km)	MMI	Notes	Casualties	
Date	Country and location	M_{w}	Depth (km)	MMI	Notes	Dead	Injured
6	Fiji	6.7	360.2				
16	Australia, west coast of Bougainville Island, Papua and New Guinea	7.0	179.2				
21	Indonesia, Papua (province)	6.7	41.3	VI			
28	Guatemala, off the west coast of	6.7	44.8	VI			

=== September ===
September
- Strongest: 6.7 M_{w} 2 events
- Deadliest: 6.2 M_{w} Egypt; 22 deaths
- Total fatalities: 33

Number by magnitude
- 8.0–8.9: 0
- 7.0–7.9: 0
- 6.0–6.9: 14
- 5.0–5.9: 1

Date	Country and location	M_{w}	Depth (km)	MMI	Notes	Casualties	
Date	Country and location	M_{w}	Depth (km)	MMI	Notes	Dead	Injured
1	Costa Rica, Alajuela Province	5.8	15.0	VI	10 people were killed and some damage was caused.	10	
3	Guatemala, off the west coast of	6.4	44.1	VI			
3	Indonesia, Gulf of Tomini	6.5	294.1				
4	United Kingdom, Lake Albert (Uganda)	6.3	15.0				
8	Australia, south of Bougainville Island, Papua and New Guinea	6.3	50.0	V			
9	Indonesia, off the west coast of southern Sumatra	6.0	40.6	IV			
11	Australia, south of Bougainville Island, Papua and New Guinea	6.4	15.0	VI			
12	Egypt, off the north coast	6.2	63.7	IV	22 people were killed and 12 were injured in the 1955 Alexandria earthquake. Major damage was caused in the area.	22	12
13	United States, Andreanof Islands, Alaska	6.0	55.0				
21	New Hebrides, Vanuatu	6.0	15.0	VI			
22	Taiwan, off the east coast of	6.6	45.0	V			
23	China, Yunnan Province	6.7	10.0	IX	At least 1 person was killed and 15,000 homes were destroyed.	1	
24	Taiwan, off the southeast coast of	6.3	15.0	VI			
25	Philippines, east of Mindanao	6.6	91.8				
26	Mexico, Chiapas	6.7	202.8				

=== October ===
October
- Strongest: 7.3 M_{w} Australia
- Total fatalities: 0

Number by magnitude
- 8.0–8.9: 0
- 7.0–7.9: 1
- 6.0–6.9: 5
- 5.0–5.9: 1

Date	Country and location	M_{w}	Depth (km)	MMI	Notes	Casualties	
Date	Country and location	M_{w}	Depth (km)	MMI	Notes	Dead	Injured
1	China, Sichuan Province	5.9	15.0	VII	A few homes were destroyed.		
6	Argentina, Neuquen Province	6.5	167.3				
9	Australia, south of New Ireland (island), Papua and New Guinea	6.1	50.0	V	Foreshock.		
10	Australia, south of New Ireland (island), Papua and New Guinea	7.3	20.0	VII			
13	United Kingdom, eastern Guadalcanal, Solomon Islands	6.3	35.0	VI			
21	Indonesia, east of Sulawesi	6.4	35.0	VI			
24	New Zealand, Kermadec Islands	6.5	362.0				

=== November ===
November
- Strongest: 6.7 M_{w} Soviet Union
- Total fatalities: 0

Number by magnitude
- 8.0–8.9: 0
- 7.0–7.9: 0
- 6.0–6.9: 4

Date	Country and location	M_{w}	Depth (km)	MMI	Notes	Casualties	
Date	Country and location	M_{w}	Depth (km)	MMI	Notes	Dead	Injured
4	Chile, O'Higgins Region	6.5	112.0				
10	Tonga	6.1	65.0				
17	Chile, Atacama Region	6.3	33.8	VII			
23	Soviet Union, far northern Kuril Islands, Russia	6.7	53.3	VI			

=== December ===
December
- Strongest: 6.9 M_{w} Japan
- Total fatalities: 0

Number by magnitude
- 8.0–8.9: 0
- 7.0–7.9: 0
- 6.0–6.9: 4

Date	Country and location	M_{w}	Depth (km)	MMI	Notes	Casualties	
Date	Country and location	M_{w}	Depth (km)	MMI	Notes	Dead	Injured
6	Chile, off the coast of Tarapaca Region	6.3	35.0	VI			
7	Japan, Bonin Islands	6.9	10.0				
14	Burma, Chin State	6.2	35.0	VI			
19	Philippines, east of Mindanao	6.1	15.0				
