= 1738 Dangjiang earthquake =

Earthquake in China

- Location within China Location within Qinghai
- Local date: 23 December 1738
- Magnitude: 7.6 M_{w}
- Epicenter: 33.3°N 96.6°E
- Fault: Xianshuihe fault system, Diangjiang Fault segment
- Type: strike-slip
- Areas affected: China, Qinghai
- Max. intensity: MMI VIII (Severe)
- Casualties: 261–500

On 23 December 1738 the province of Qinghai was struck by an earthquake with an estimated magnitude of 7.6 M_{w}. It ruptured the westernmost part of the Xianshuihe fault system, the Dangjiang segment. It led to 261–500 deaths.

== Tectonic setting ==
Qinghai lies within the eastern part of the Tibetan Plateau, which is a result of the ongoing collision between the Indian Plate and the Eurasian Plate. This huge area of thickened crust is spreading eastwards. The plateau is divided into several blocks bounded by large WNW-ESE trending left lateral strike-slip fault zones. The Xianshuihe fault system separates the Bayan Har block to the north from the Quiangtang Block to the south. The western part of the overall fault system has three main segments, from the west the Dangjiang, Yushu and Ganzi faults. The estimated slip rate on the Dangjiang segment is about 6–7 mm per year.

== Earthquake ==
The magnitude of this earthquake has been calculated from observations of surface rupture and estimates of co-seismic (during the earthquake) slip. A total of about 100 km of rupture have been mapped on the Dangjiang fault segment. A maximum left-lateral offset of 3.3 m has been measured and an average offset of 2.2 m. These measurements have been used to calculate a magnitude of M_{w} 7.6.

== Impact ==
Estimates of casualties for this event vary. Sources mention death tolls of 261, 336 and 500.

== Future seismic hazard ==
The Dangjian segment shows evidence of several previous ruptures. The lack of seismic activity on this fault since 1738 means that sufficient slip has occurred to generate an earthquake of M_{w} 7.3.
