= Gezong, Sichuan =

Gezong 格宗镇
- Town
- Gezongzhen
- Location in Sichuan
- Coordinates: 30°47′25″N 101°56′34″E
- Country: People's Republic of China
- Province: Sichuan
- Autonomous prefecture: Garzê Tibetan Autonomous Prefecture
- County: Danba County

Area
  - Total: 361.6 km^{2} (139.6 sq mi)

Population (2010)
  - Total: 4,043
  - Density: 11.18/km^{2} (28.96/sq mi)
- Time zone: UTC+8 (China Standard)

Gezong (Mandarin: 格宗镇) is a town in Danba County, Garzê Tibetan Autonomous Prefecture, Sichuan, China. In 2010, Gezong had a total population of 4,043: 2,048 males and 1,995 females: 867 aged under 14, 2,833 aged between 15 and 65 and 343 aged over 65.
