= Luhuo County =

Luhuo County 炉霍县 · བྲག་འགོ་རྫོང་། Lu-ho, Draggo
- County
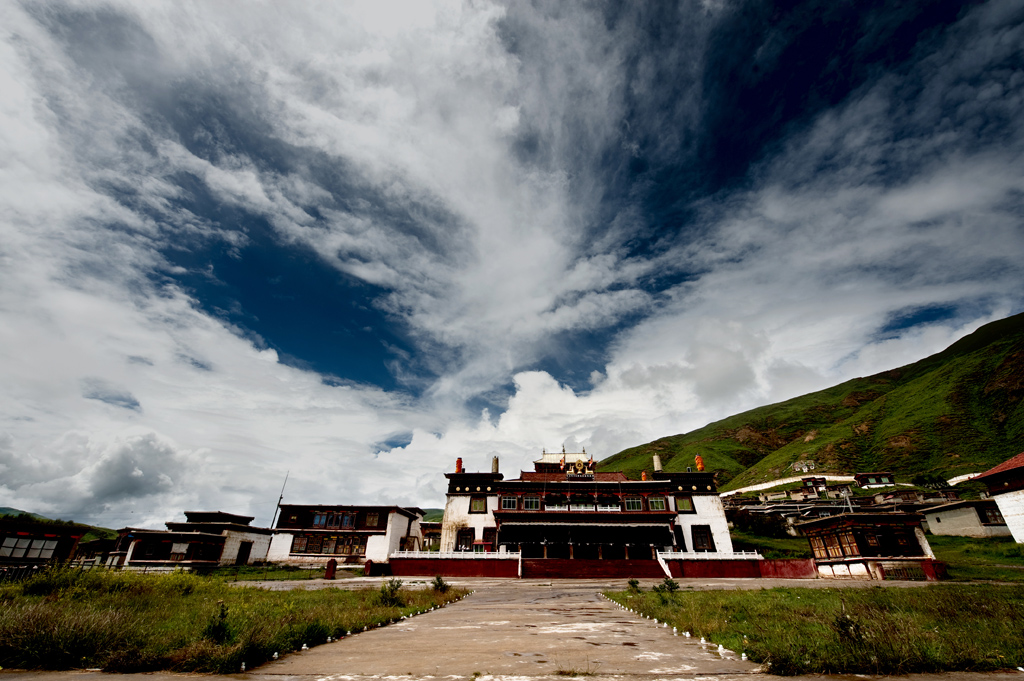
- Karsa Monastery

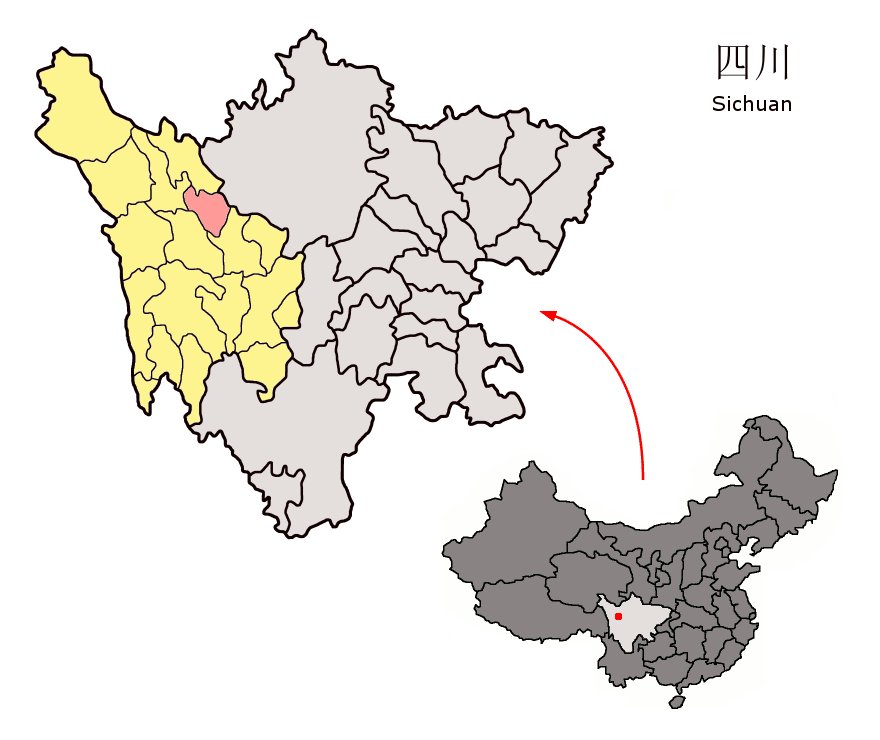
- Location of Luhuo County (red) within Garzê Prefecture (yellow) and Sichuan

- Location of the seat in Sichuan Luhuo (China)
- Coordinates: 31°27′N 100°42′E
- Country: China
- Province: Sichuan
- Autonomous prefecture: Garzê
- County seat: Xindo (Xindu)

Area
  - Total: 4,601 km^{2} (1,776 sq mi)

Population (2020)
  - Total: 47,185
  - Density: 10.26/km^{2} (26.56/sq mi)
- Time zone: UTC+8 (China Standard)
- Website: www.luhuo.gov.cn

Luhuo County

Chinese name
- Simplified Chinese: 炉霍县
- Traditional Chinese: 爐霍縣
Transcriptions
Standard Mandarin
- Hanyu Pinyin: Lúhuò Xiàn

Tibetan name
- Tibetan: བྲག་འགོ་རྫོང་།
Transcriptions
- Wylie: brag 'go rdzong
- Tibetan Pinyin: Chaggo Zong

Luhuo County or Chaggo (Chinese: 炉霍县; Tibetan: བྲག་འགོ་རྫོང་།) is a county of Sichuan Province, China. It is under the administration of the Garzê Tibetan Autonomous Prefecture.

== History ==
On March 24, 1923, a magnitude 7.3 earthquake struck between Luhuo and Dawu and killed 4800 people.

On February 6, 1973, a magnitude 7.6 earthquake occurred near Zhaggo, a town in the county.

== Administrative divisions ==
Zhaggo County is divided into 4 towns and 11 townships:

Name	Simplified Chinese	Hanyu Pinyin	Tibetan	Wylie	Administrative division code
Towns
Xindo Town (Xindu)	新都镇	Xīndū Zhèn	ཤིས་མདོ་གྲོང་རྡལ།	shis mdo grong rdal	513327100
Zhêhor Town (Zhuwo)	朱倭镇	Zhūwō Zhèn	ཏྲེ་ཧོར་གྲོང་རྡལ།	tre hor grong rdal	513327101
Xaratang Town (Xialatuo)	虾拉沱镇	Xiālātuó Zhèn	ཤ་རྭ་ཐང་གྲོང་རྡལ།	sha rwa thang grong rdal	513327103
Ligogdoima Town (Shangluokema)	上罗柯马镇	Shàngluókēmǎ Zhèn	ལི་ཀོག་སྟོད་མ་གྲོང་རྡལ།	li kog stod ma grong rdal	513327104
Townships
Nyiba Township (Niba)	泥巴乡	Níbā Xiāng	སྙ་པ་ཤང་།	snya pa shang	513327200
Yardê Township (Yade)	雅德乡	Yǎdé Xiāng	ཡར་སྡེ་ཤང་།	yar sde shang	513327201
Norqung Township (Luoqiu)	洛秋乡	Luòqiū Xiāng	ནོར་ཆུང་ཤང་།	nor chung shang	513327202
Xinda Township (Rinda, Renda)	仁达乡	Réndá Xiāng	གཞི་མདའ་ཤང་།	gzhi mda' shang	513327205
Dando Township (Dandu)	旦都乡	Dàndū Xiāng	མདའ་མདོ་ཤང་།	mda' mdo shang	513327207
Conggo Township (Chonggu)	充古乡	Chōnggǔ Xiāng	མཚོ་འགོ་ཤང་།	mtsho 'go shang	513327208
Gêzê Township (Gengzhi)	更知乡	Gēngzhī Xiāng	དགེ་རྩེ་ཤང་།	dge rtse shang	513327209
Karnya Township (Karnyag, Kaniang)	卡娘乡	Kǎniáng Xiāng	མཁར་གཉའ་ཤང་།	mkhar gnya' shang	513327210
Zangdoi Township (Zongta)	宗塔乡	Zōngtǎ Xiāng	གཙང་སྟོད་ཤང་།	gtsang stod shang	513327211
Zangmai Township (Zongmai)	宗麦乡	Zōngmài Xiāng	གཙང་སྨད་ཤང་།	gtsang smad shang	513327212
Likogma Maima Township (Limai, Xialuokema)	下罗柯马乡	Xiàluókēmǎ Xiāng	ལི་ཁོག་མ་སྨད་མ་ཤང་།	li khog ma smad ma shang	513327214

== Climate ==
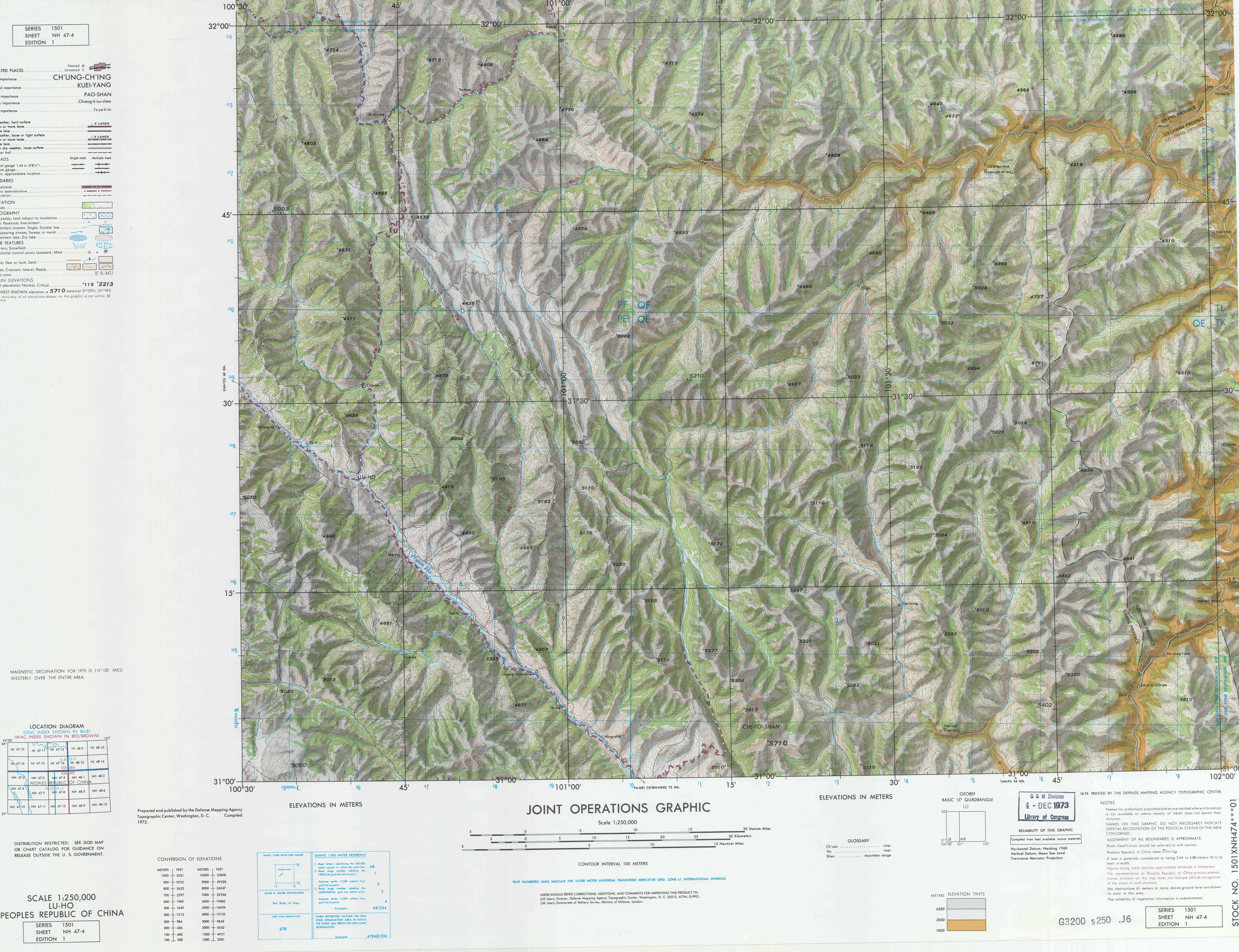

Climate data for Luhuo, elevation 3,250 m (10,660 ft), (1991–2020 normals, extremes 1981–present)
Month	Jan	Feb	Mar	Apr	May	Jun	Jul	Aug	Sep	Oct	Nov	Dec	Year
Record high °C (°F)	22.1 (71.8)	21.9 (71.4)	27.3 (81.1)	28.9 (84.0)	30.3 (86.5)	31.0 (87.8)	31.2 (88.2)	30.1 (86.2)	27.9 (82.2)	26.3 (79.3)	23.2 (73.8)	20.0 (68.0)	31.2 (88.2)
Mean daily maximum °C (°F)	8.6 (47.5)	11.0 (51.8)	13.7 (56.7)	17.0 (62.6)	20.1 (68.2)	21.5 (70.7)	22.6 (72.7)	22.7 (72.9)	20.4 (68.7)	16.3 (61.3)	12.5 (54.5)	9.2 (48.6)	16.3 (61.4)
Daily mean °C (°F)	−2.7 (27.1)	0.6 (33.1)	4.2 (39.6)	7.8 (46.0)	11.5 (52.7)	13.9 (57.0)	15.0 (59.0)	14.6 (58.3)	12.2 (54.0)	7.4 (45.3)	1.6 (34.9)	−2.6 (27.3)	7.0 (44.5)
Mean daily minimum °C (°F)	−10.8 (12.6)	−7.3 (18.9)	−3.1 (26.4)	0.8 (33.4)	4.9 (40.8)	8.5 (47.3)	9.8 (49.6)	9.3 (48.7)	7.1 (44.8)	1.7 (35.1)	−5.4 (22.3)	−10.2 (13.6)	0.4 (32.8)
Record low °C (°F)	−24.0 (−11.2)	−19.3 (−2.7)	−14.3 (6.3)	−7.2 (19.0)	−4.5 (23.9)	0.0 (32.0)	1.6 (34.9)	0.5 (32.9)	−1.9 (28.6)	−9.3 (15.3)	−16.9 (1.6)	−21.7 (−7.1)	−24.0 (−11.2)
Average precipitation mm (inches)	4.0 (0.16)	7.1 (0.28)	19.8 (0.78)	38.3 (1.51)	78.0 (3.07)	153.8 (6.06)	140.2 (5.52)	102.0 (4.02)	108.6 (4.28)	52.5 (2.07)	7.2 (0.28)	2.8 (0.11)	714.3 (28.14)
Average precipitation days (≥ 0.1 mm)	3.1	5.5	9.2	13.4	19.3	23.8	21.2	18.5	19.3	13.4	4.3	2.5	153.5
Average snowy days	4.9	7.7	10.7	5.8	0.7	0	0	0	0.1	2.5	5.2	3.9	41.5
Average relative humidity (%)	42	43	48	53	58	69	71	71	72	67	54	47	58
Mean monthly sunshine hours	208.0	185.3	214.1	214.9	216.7	185.9	188.0	188.9	177.9	183.9	203.9	218.2	2,385.7
Percentage possible sunshine	65	59	57	55	51	44	44	46	49	53	65	70	55
Source: China Meteorological Administration All-time Nov Record low
