= Xianshuihe fault system =

Geological feature in Asia

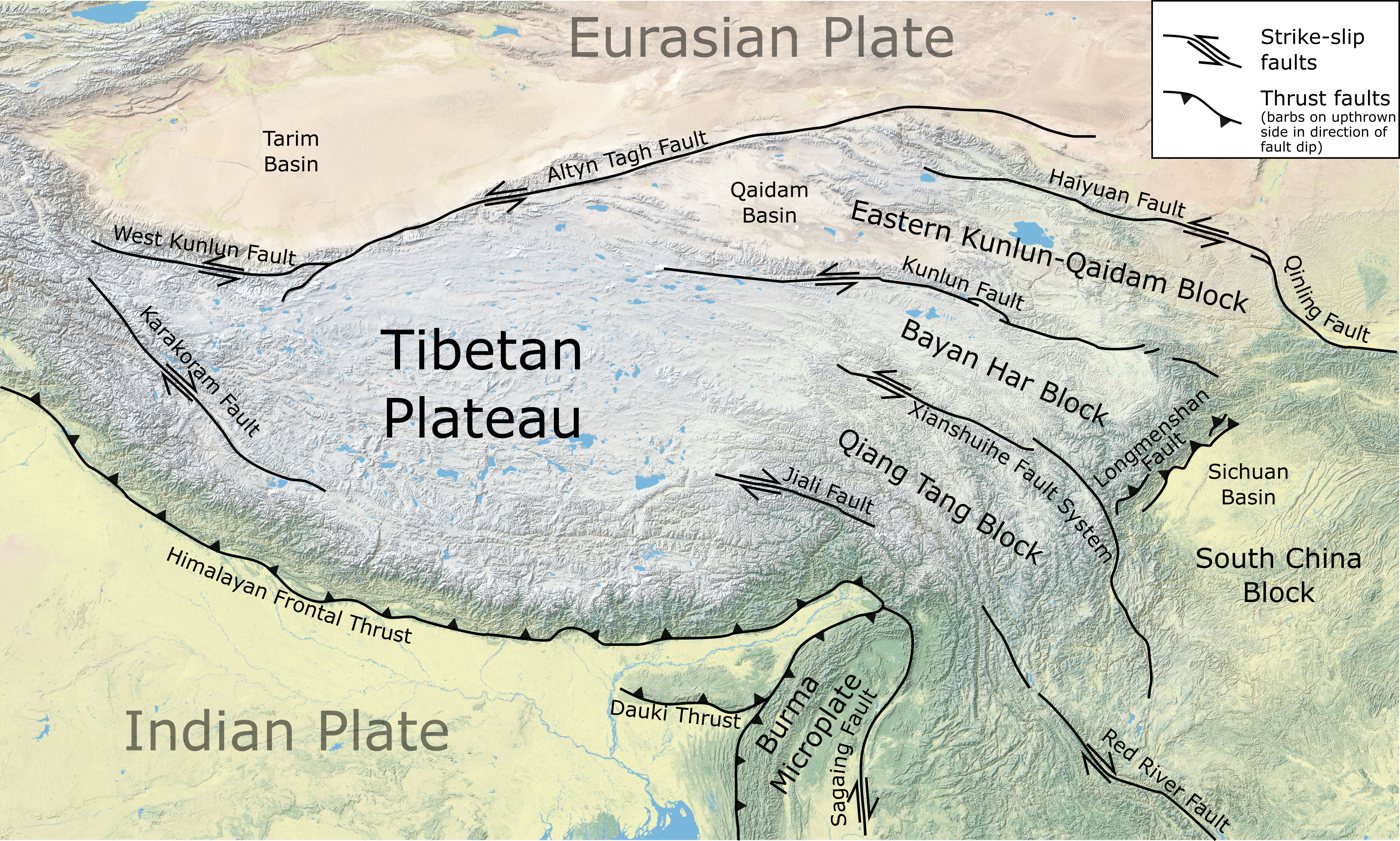
Map of major active fault zones in the Tibetan Plateau

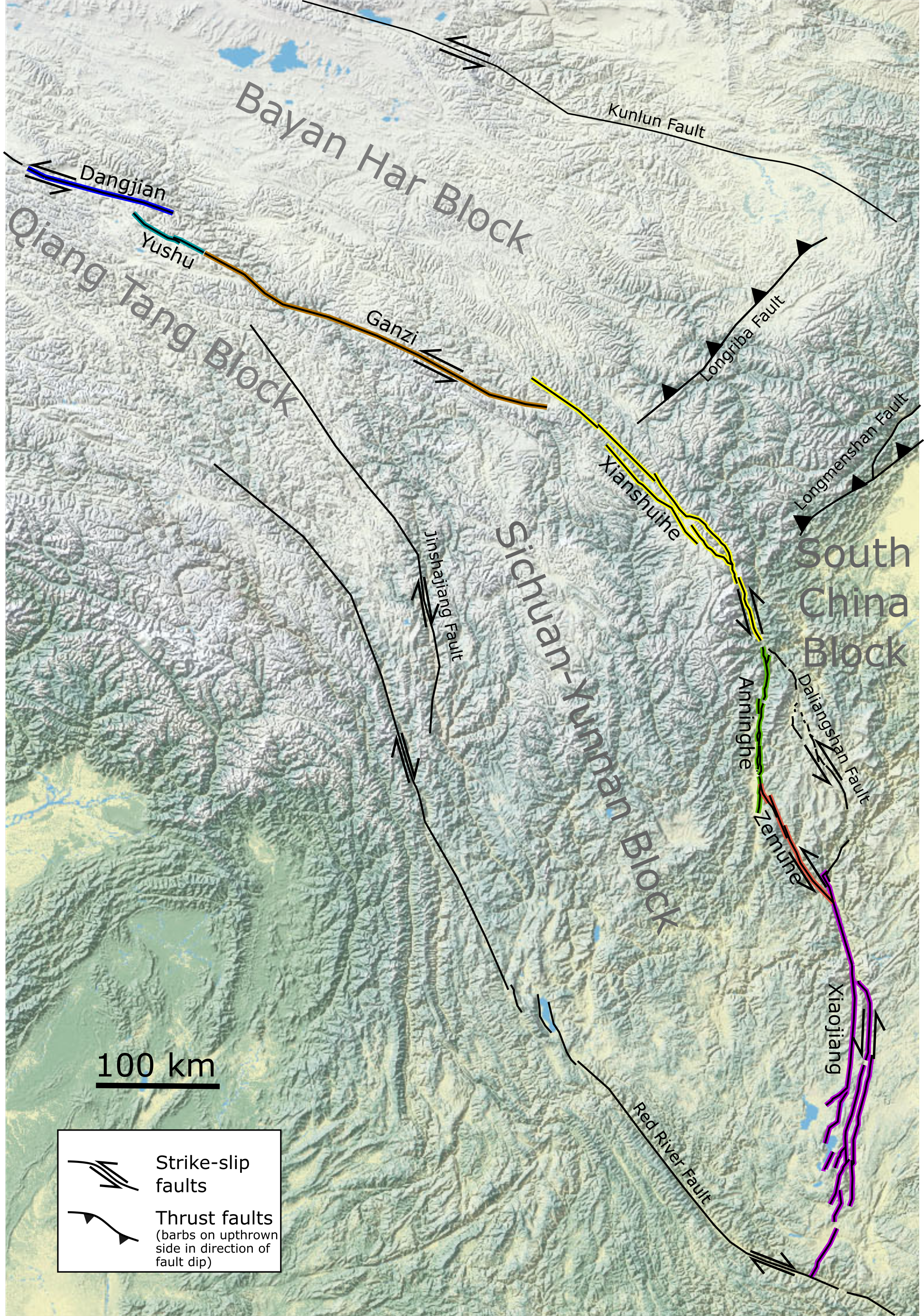
Map of the main segments of the Xianshuihe fault system (coloured)

The Xianshuihe fault system or the Yushu-Ganzi-Xianshuihe fault system is a major active sinistral (left-lateral) strike-slip fault zone in southwestern China, at the eastern edge of the Tibetan Plateau. It has been responsible for many major earthquakes, and is one of the most seismically active fault zones in China.

== Tectonic setting ==
The Xianshuihe fault system lies within the complex zone of continental collision between the Indian Plate and the Eurasian Plate. It forms one of a set of sinistral fault zones that help accommodate the eastward spreading of the Tibetan Plateau. The fault zone defines the northern and eastern edges of the Qiangtang block (also known in part as the Sichuan-Yunnan block), and the southeastern boundary of the Bayan Har block. To the southeast it also forms the western margin of the South China Block.

== Geometry ==
The Xianshuihe fault system comprises several distinct segments, with an overall length of 1,400 km. The main segments are the Dangjiang, Yushu, Ganzi, (or Ganzi-Yushu), the Xianshuihe, the Anninghe-Zemuhe, and the Xiaojiang faults. Each of these faults are themselves divided into smaller segments. The fault system has also been divided into a western part and an eastern part, with the division between the Ganzi and Xianshuihe segments.

=== Dangjiang segment ===
This segment is about 170 km in length. At its western end it connects to the Fenghuoshan Fault, which continues on into a poorly studied region. At its eastern end it overlaps with the Yushu segment to which it links through a right-stepping compressional stepover of 25 km, which is associated with a 20 km wide zone of uplift. The easterly 100 km of the segment are thought to have ruptured during the M7.6 1738 Dangjiang earthquake.

=== Yushu segment ===
The total length of this segment is about 170 km. At its eastern end the Yushu segment connects through to the Ganzi segment through the Batang Basin. The segment has two main sections that are linked via a left-stepping extensional stepover through the Longbao Lake Basin, a pull-apart structure 30 km x 6 km in size. In 2010 about 50–80 km of this segment ruptured during the M7.1 2010 Yushu earthquake.

=== Ganzi segment ===
This approximately 300 km long segment is subdivided into three sections. The 70 km long Denke section that ruptured during an M7.0–7.5 earthquake in 1896, the 170 km long Manigange section that ruptured in a M7.7–8.0 earthquake in 1854 and the 65 km long Ganzi section, which ruptured in a M7.1–7.3 earthquake in 1866. The eastern end of the segment overlaps with the Xianshuihe segment via a 45 km left-stepping extensional stepover.

=== Xianshuihe segment ===
This approximately 350 km long northwest–southeast trending segment is divided into five main sub-sections, from northwest to southeast, the Luhuo, Daofu, Qianning, Kangding and Moxi. There is evidence of aseismic creep along much of this segment. An overall slip rate of 12 mm per year has been estimated for this segment from the analysis of InSAR data. In detail there is evidence of an increase from the northwestern end of the segment, consistent with ongoing shortening within the Bayan Har block.

A series of historical earthquakes have been associated with the Xianshuihe segment, the most recent events on each section were 1786 (M7.7 Moxi), 1893 (M7.0 Qianning), 1923 (M7.3 Daofu), 1973 (M7.6 Luhuo) and 2014 (M6.3 Kangding).

=== Anninghe–Zemuhe segment ===
This ~250 km long segment is formed of two main sections; the Anninghe, which runs north–south in the north and the Zemuhe that runs NNW–SSE, linking together at a sharp bend. There is an additional fault that lies further east, the Dalingshan Fault. The Anninghe section has an estimated slip rate of 3.6–4.0 mm per year while that for the Zemuhe section is 3–5 mm per year. Paleoseimological investigations suggest that some of the large earthquake, such as those in 814 and 1850 ruptured across the bend between the two sections, while some, such as that in 1536 only ruptured the Anninge section.

=== Xiaojiang segment ===
The southernmost segment of the fault system runs for about 400 km from the end of the Zemuhe section to its junction with the right-lateral Red River Fault. The Xiaojiang Fault is subdivided into northern, central and southern sections. The northern section consists of a single fault strand, the central section of two main parallel fault strands and the southern sections of multiple fault strands. The Quaternary slip rate for the central and northern segments is estimated as 10–16 mm per year and currently 7–10 mm per year. Historical earthquake along this segment include a M8.0 event in 1833 and a M7.8 event in 1733.

== Seismicity ==
Movements on this fault system have been responsible for many large historical earthquakes, with more than 20 events of magnitude greater than 6.5 since 1700. Some of these earthquakes have formed linked sequences, with each event being triggered by the previous one due to stress changes.

== Creep ==
Like the San Andreas Fault in California, the eastern part of the Xianshuihe fault system exhibits a behavior called aseismic creep. The Xianshuihe fault creeps at a rate of a few mm/yr between earthquakes.

=== Notable earthquakes ===
- 1786 Kangding-Luding earthquake
- 1850 Xichang earthquake
- 1923 Renda earthquake
- 1955 Zheduotang earthquake
- 1973 Luhuo earthquake
- 1981 Dawu earthquake
- 2010 Yushu earthquake
- 2022 Luding earthquake

== See also ==
- Xianshui River
