= Dawu County, Sichuan =

Dawu County 道孚县 · རྟའུ་རྫོང Daofu
- County
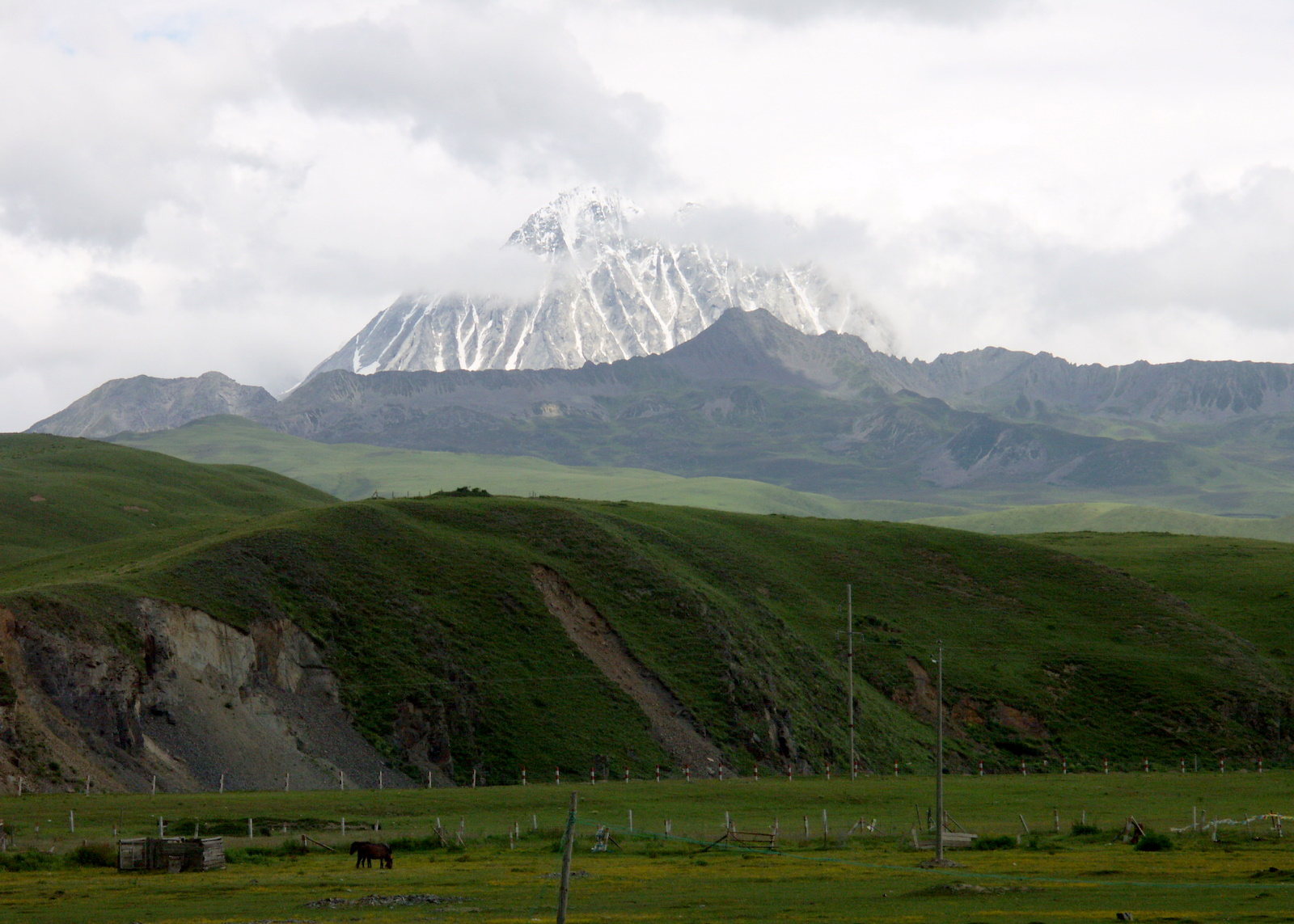
- Yagra Mountain

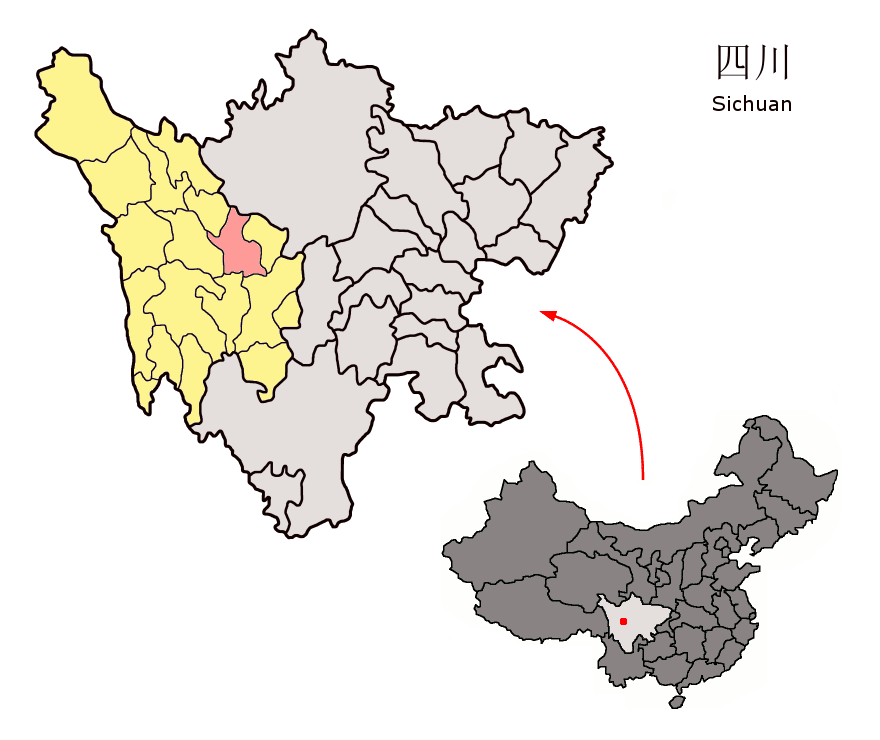
- Location of Dawu County (red) within Garzê Prefecture (yellow) and Sichuan.

- Location in Sichuan Dawu (China)
- Coordinates: 30°59′N 101°08′E
- Country: China
- Province: Sichuan
- Autonomous prefecture: Garzê
- County seat: Xêqu (Xianshui)

Area
  - Total: 7,546 km^{2} (2,914 sq mi)
- Elevation: 2,992 m (9,816 ft)

Population (2020)
  - Total: 53,378
  - Density: 7.074/km^{2} (18.32/sq mi)
- Time zone: UTC+8 (China Standard)
- Website: www.gzdf.gov.cn

Dawu County, Sichuan

Chinese name
- Simplified Chinese: 道孚县
- Traditional Chinese: 道孚縣
Transcriptions
Standard Mandarin
- Hanyu Pinyin: Dàofú Xiàn

Tibetan name
- Tibetan: རྟའུ་རྫོང
Transcriptions
- Wylie: rta 'u rdzong
- Tibetan Pinyin: Da'u Zong or Dawu Zong

Dawu County (Tibetan: རྟའུ་རྫོང་།), also written Tawu County or Daofu County (Chinese: 道孚县), is a county of northwestern Sichuan Province, China. It is under the administration of the Garzê Tibetan Autonomous Prefecture, and as of 2001, had a population of 46,900 residing in an area of 7,546 square kilometres (2,914 sq mi). By road it is 219 km (136 mi) from Kangding, the prefectural seat, and 585 km (364 mi) from Chengdu, the provincial capital. It borders the counties of Xinlong to the west, Kangding and Yajiang to the south, and Jinchuan and Zamtang of Ngawa Prefecture as well as Luhuo to the north.

In January 1981 it was struck by an earthquake.

== Administrative divisions ==
Dawu County is divided into 7 towns and 12 townships:

Name	Simplified Chinese	Hanyu Pinyin	Tibetan	Wylie	Administrative division code
Towns
Xêqu Town (Xianshui)	鲜水镇	Xiānshuǐ Zhèn	ཤེལ་ཆུ་གྲོང་རྡལ།	shel chu grong rdal	513326100
Pamai Town (Bamei)	八美镇	Bāměi Zhèn	བ་སྨད་གྲོང་རྡལ།	ba smad grong rdal	513326101
Xagzig Town (Yazhuo)	亚卓镇	Yàzhuó Zhèn	བཞག་བརྩིགས་གྲོང་རྡལ།	bzhag brtsigs grong rdal	513326102
Yukar Town (Yuke)	玉科镇	Yùkē Zhèn	གཡུ་མཁར་གྲོང་རྡལ	g.yu mkhar grong rdal	513326104
Zhungnyi Town (Zhongni)	仲尼镇	Zhòngní Zhèn	ཀྲུང་ཉི་གྲོང་རྡལ།	krung nyi grong rdal	513326105
Gartar Town (Taining)	泰宁镇	Tàiníng Zhèn	མགར་ཐར་གྲོང་རྡལ།	mgar thar grong rdal	513326106
Waxab Town (Wari)	瓦日镇	Wǎrì Zhèn	དབའ་ཞབས་གྲོང་རྡལ།	dba' zhabs grong rdal	513326107
Townships
Masur Township (Mazi)	麻孜乡	Mázī Xiāng	མ་ཟུར་ཤང་།	ma zur shang	513326201
Kangsar Township (Kongse)	孔色乡	Kǒngsè Xiāng	ཁང་གསར་ཤང་།	khang gsar shang	513326202
Kugqa Township (Geka)	葛卡乡	Gěkǎ Xiāng	ཁུག་ཆ་ཤང་།	khug cha shang	513326203
Zhagtog Township (Zhatuo)	扎拖乡	Zhātuō Xiāng	བྲག་ཐོག་ཤང་།	brag thog shang	513326207
Qatang Township (Xiatuo)	下拖乡	Xiàtuō Xiāng	བྱ་ཐང་ཤང་།	bya thang shang	513326208
Mugri Township (Muru)	木茹乡	Mùrú Xiāng	སྨུག་རི་ཤང་།	smug ri shang	513326210
Jaggang Township (Jiasikong)	甲斯孔乡	Jiǎsīkǒng Xiāng	ལྕགས་སྐང་ཤང་།	lcags skang shang	513326211
Qumar Township (Qimei)	七美乡	Qīměi Xiāng	ཆུ་དམར་ཤང་།	chu dmar shang	513326213
Yungoin Township (Yi'ngoi, Yin'en)	银恩乡	Yín'ēn Xiāng	གཡུ་སྔོན་ཤང་།	g.yu sngon shang	513326214
Lungdain Township (Longdeng)	龙灯乡	Lóngdēng Xiāng	ལུང་བསྟན་ཡུལ།	lung bstan yul	513326216
Sêrka Township (Seka)	色卡乡	Sèkǎ Xiāng	གསེར་ཁ་ཤང་།	gser kha shang	513326218
Xarchong Township (Shachong)	沙冲乡	Shāchōng Xiāng	ཤར་གྲོང་ཤང་།	shar grong shang	513326219

== Climate ==
Climate data for Dawu, elevation 3,009 m (9,872 ft), (1991–2020 normals, extremes 1981–present)
Month	Jan	Feb	Mar	Apr	May	Jun	Jul	Aug	Sep	Oct	Nov	Dec	Year
Record high °C (°F)	22.4 (72.3)	25.9 (78.6)	29.9 (85.8)	28.8 (83.8)	31.6 (88.9)	31.2 (88.2)	33.4 (92.1)	35.1 (95.2)	30.3 (86.5)	27.5 (81.5)	22.9 (73.2)	22.0 (71.6)	35.1 (95.2)
Mean daily maximum °C (°F)	10.4 (50.7)	12.8 (55.0)	15.5 (59.9)	18.4 (65.1)	21.4 (70.5)	23.0 (73.4)	24.2 (75.6)	24.3 (75.7)	22.0 (71.6)	18.1 (64.6)	14.3 (57.7)	10.8 (51.4)	17.9 (64.3)
Daily mean °C (°F)	−1.4 (29.5)	2.0 (35.6)	5.7 (42.3)	9.3 (48.7)	12.8 (55.0)	15.1 (59.2)	16.2 (61.2)	16.0 (60.8)	13.6 (56.5)	8.9 (48.0)	3.1 (37.6)	−1.2 (29.8)	8.3 (47.0)
Mean daily minimum °C (°F)	−9.5 (14.9)	−6.2 (20.8)	−2.0 (28.4)	2.0 (35.6)	6.1 (43.0)	9.8 (49.6)	11.2 (52.2)	10.7 (51.3)	8.6 (47.5)	3.1 (37.6)	−4.1 (24.6)	−8.8 (16.2)	1.7 (35.1)
Record low °C (°F)	−21.7 (−7.1)	−14.7 (5.5)	−12.1 (10.2)	−6.1 (21.0)	−3.7 (25.3)	0.8 (33.4)	2.1 (35.8)	1.9 (35.4)	−1.0 (30.2)	−6.4 (20.5)	−12.4 (9.7)	−24 (−11)	−24 (−11)
Average precipitation mm (inches)	2.2 (0.09)	4.0 (0.16)	11.7 (0.46)	35.4 (1.39)	67.9 (2.67)	147.9 (5.82)	126.6 (4.98)	97.5 (3.84)	110.8 (4.36)	40.1 (1.58)	5.0 (0.20)	1.3 (0.05)	650.4 (25.6)
Average precipitation days (≥ 0.1 mm)	2.0	3.4	7.8	13.5	18.0	23.2	20.1	17.7	18.8	13.6	3.8	1.5	143.4
Average snowy days	3.7	5.4	6.3	1.8	0.2	0	0	0	0	0.3	2.9	2.6	23.2
Average relative humidity (%)	45	43	47	52	57	68	70	69	71	67	56	50	58
Mean monthly sunshine hours	203.7	183.3	205.4	205.0	211.4	180.2	185.1	191.6	182.4	193.2	201.4	214.9	2,357.6
Percentage possible sunshine	63	58	55	53	50	43	43	47	50	55	64	69	54
Source: China Meteorological Administration all-time extreme temperature
