= Geological Journal =

Journal

- Discipline: Geology
- Language: English
- Edited by: Ian D. Somerville, Yunpeng Dong

Publication details
- History: 1951-present
- Publisher: Wiley in affiliation with Northwest University
- Frequency: Monthly
- Open access: Hybrid
- Impact factor: 1.8 (2022)

Standard abbreviations
- ISO 4: Geol. J.

Indexing
- CODEN: GELJA8
- ISSN: 0072-1050 (print); 1099-1034 (web)
- OCLC no.: 843976

Links
- Journal homepage; Online access; Online archive

The Geological Journal is a monthly peer-reviewed scientific journal covering all aspects of geology. It is published by Wiley in affiliation with Northwest University and the editors-in-chief are Ian D. Somerville (University College Dublin) and Yunpeng Dong (Northwest University). The journal was established in 1951.

== Abstracting and indexing ==
The journal is abstracted and indexed in:

- Aquatic Sciences and Fisheries Abstracts
- Chemical Abstracts Service
- Current Contents/Physical, Chemical & Earth Sciences
- EBSCO databases
- GEOBASE
- Inspec
- Science Citation Index Expanded
- Scopus
- Zoological Record

According to the Journal Citation Reports, the journal has a 2022 impact factor of 1.8.
