= Zhaggo =

- Town

Tibetan transcription(s)

Chinese transcription(s)
- Interactive map of Zhaggo
- Country: China
- Province: Sichuan
- Prefecture: Garzê Tibetan Autonomous Prefecture
- Time zone: UTC+8 (CST)

Zhaggo (Tibetan: བྲག་འགོ་གྲོང་རྡལ།, Wylie: brag vgo grong rdal; Chinese: 章谷镇; pinyin: Zhānggǔ Zhèn) is a town in the Danba County, Garzê Tibetan Autonomous Prefecture of Sichuan, China.
