= 2014 Kangding earthquake =

Earthquake in China

- Location within Sichuan
- UTC time: 2014-11-22 08:55:26
- ISC event: 605673645
- USGS-ANSS: ComCat
- Local date: 22 November 2014
- Local time: 16:55:25 UTC+8
- Magnitude: 6.3 (CENC) M_{w} 5.9 (USGS)
- Depth: 14.6 km (9.1 mi)
- Epicenter: 30.343°N 101.720°E
- Areas affected: Sichuan, China
- Total damage: 3 houses collapsed, 1 house damaged
- Casualties: 5 died, 54 injured

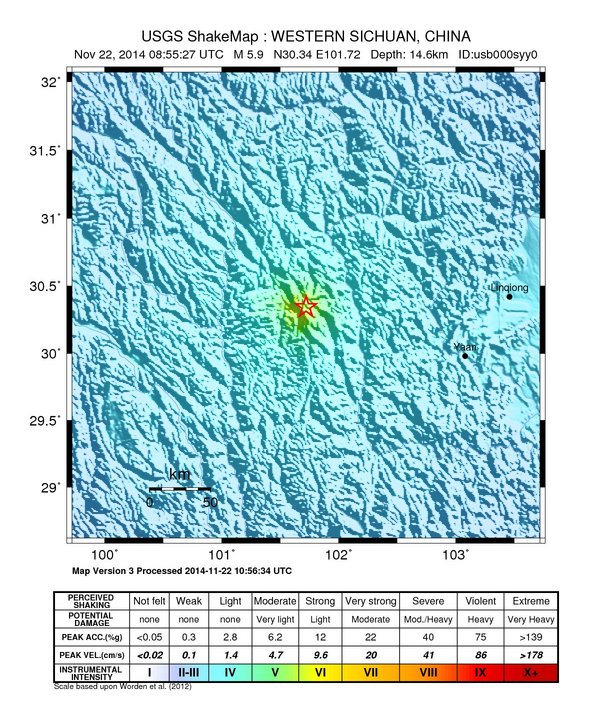
ShakeMap of the earthquake from the United States Geological Survey.

The 2014 Kangding earthquake struck Kangding County, Garzê Tibetan Autonomous Prefecture, Sichuan, China, with a moment magnitude of 5.9 on 22 November. The earthquake killed five and injured 54 people.

== Damage and casualties ==
After the quake, the power and communication have not been interrupted, according to the local officials. As of 20:40 (UTC+8) on November 22, 2014, there is a power outage in five villages of Tagong Township (塔公乡). There is no major damage was reported in the town of Kangding, where CCTV, the official media, video showed residents strolling the town's streets, looking up at the steep surrounding hillsides and talking on their cellphones. About 100 vehicles were trapped by a landslide on a highway connecting Sichuan and Tibet, and Chengdu-Kunming Railway was also halted in the area while workers checked on damage to the line.

As of 19:20 (UTC+8) on November 22, the government received 16 reports about this earthquake from 16 townships. There are three houses collapsed and one house damaged.

== Response ==
Sichuan Province launched the response of prevent disaster after the quake. Ya'an City has sent five ambulances and 30 health care personnel to Kangding at 18:00 (UTC+8) on November 22.

Xi Jinping, General Secretary of the Chinese Communist Party and President of China, said "to emphasized the need for quick action". Li Keqiang, Premier of China, has been response this quake, also said "to emphasized the need for quick action".

== See also ==
- List of earthquakes in 2014
- List of earthquakes in China
- List of earthquakes in Sichuan
