= Haiyuan Fault =

Intracontinental strike-slip fault in Tibet

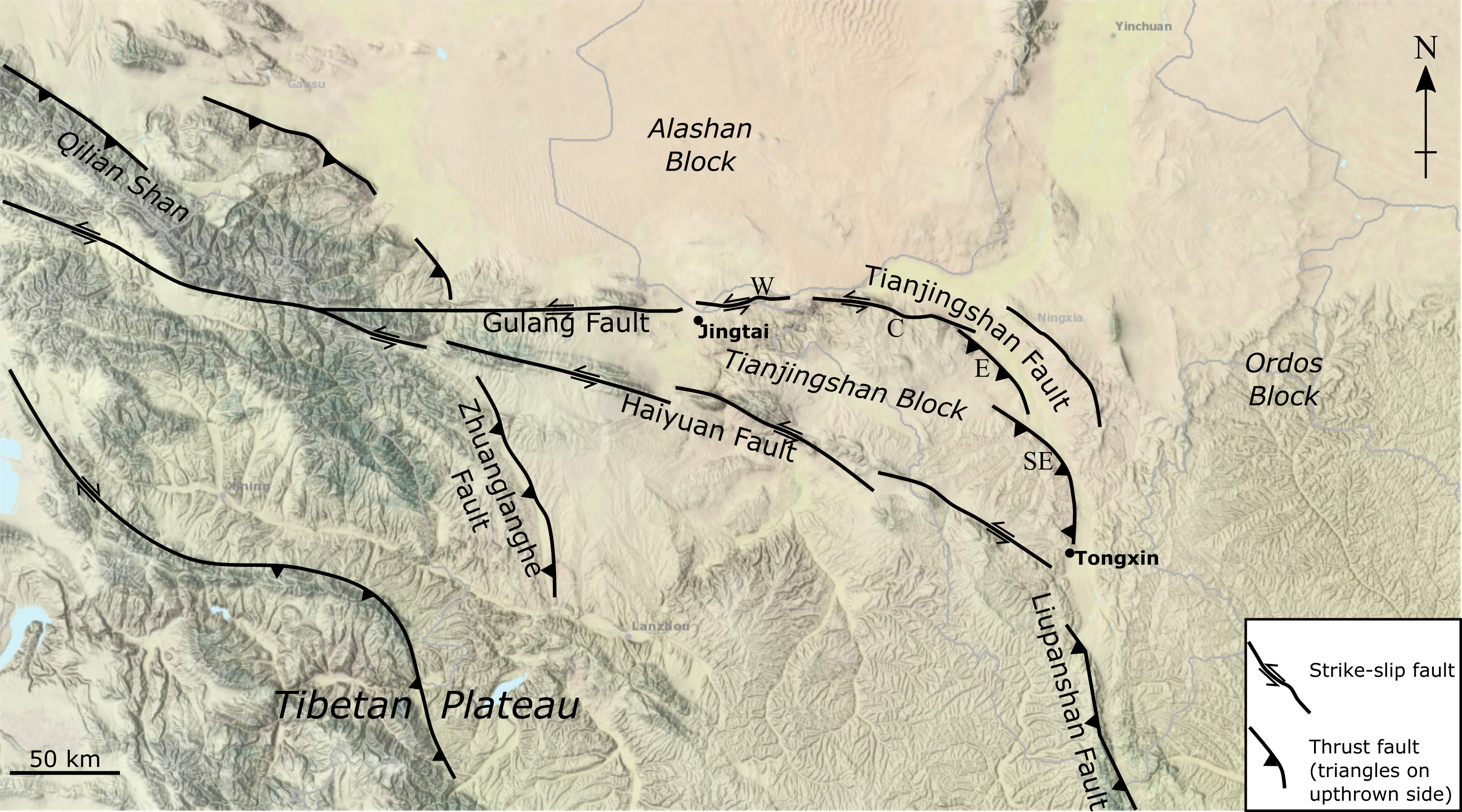
- Location: Tibet
- Country: China

Characteristics
- Length: 1,000 km (620 mi)

Tectonics
- Plate: Eurasian Plate
- Status: Active
- Earthquakes: ~174-374 AD, 1092 AD, 1920, 1927, 2022
- Type: sinistral strike-slip fault

The Haiyuan Fault is a major active intracontinental strike-slip (sinistral) fault in Central Asia.

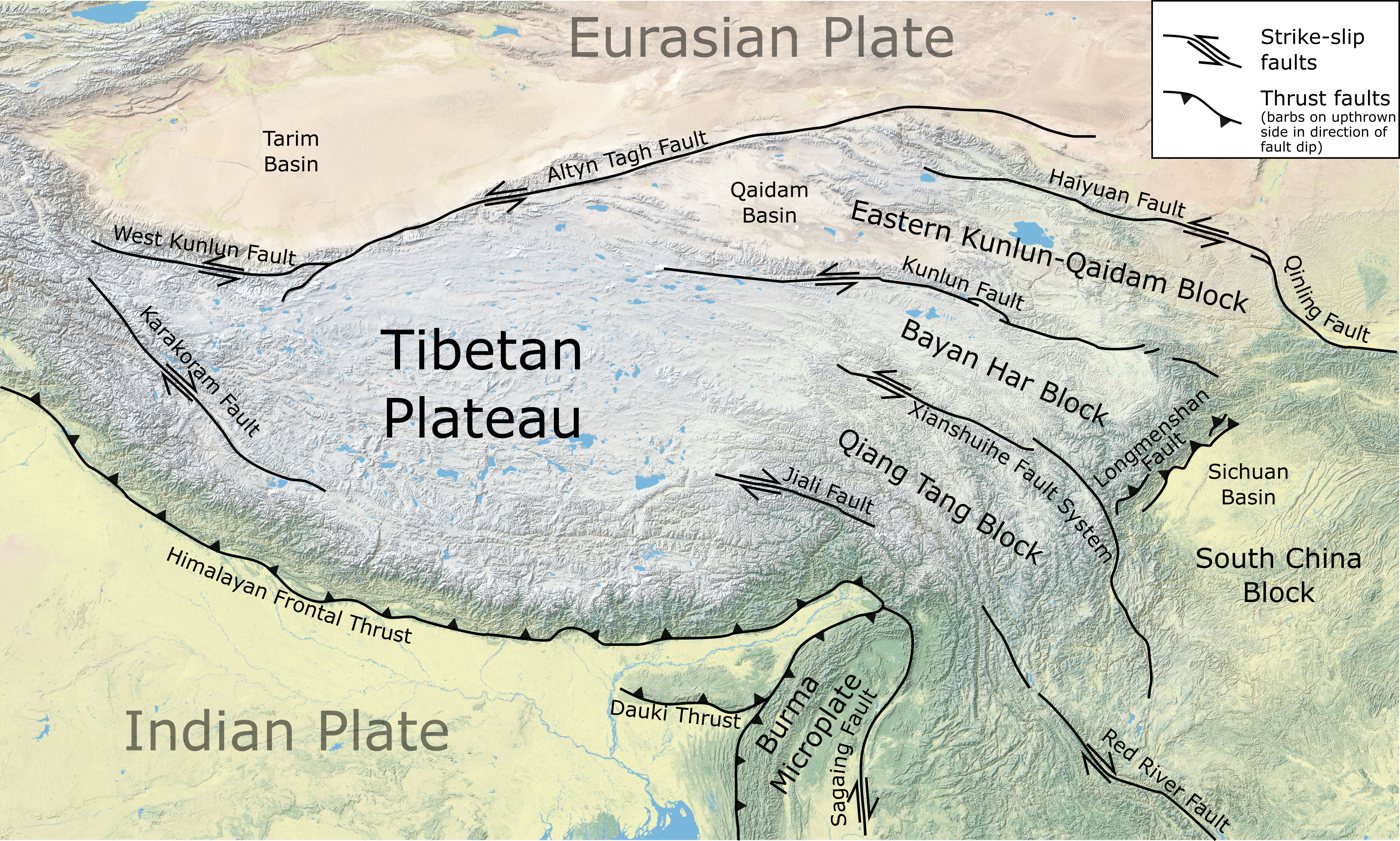
The major fault structures in the Tibetan Plateau, the Haiyuan Fault is located within the Eurasian Plate.

== Tectonic setting ==
The Haiyuan Fault forms part of the northeastern boundary of the Tibetan Plateau, which is an area of continental crust that has been thickened by the ongoing continental collision between the Indian Plate and the Eurasian Plate. The Haiyuan Fault extends for approximately 1,000 km (620 mi) from the central Qilian Shan in the west, to the Liupan Shan, in the east. It is one of the group of structures that accommodates the overall eastward spreading of the plateau, that also includes the Altyn Tagh Fault, Kunlun Fault and the Xianshuihe fault system.

== Geology ==
It is characterized by left-lateral strike-slip motion along its length, the motion transits to thrust at the eastern end, accommodated by the Liupanshan Fault. The average slip rate along the Haiyuan Fault is 3.2–9 mm/yr.

=== Tianzhu seismic gap ===
The Tianzhu seismic gap is a 260 km (160 mi) long, unruptured segment on the western end of the fault. It has not seen any major earthquakes for the past 1,000 years and was identified as a seismic gap. It poses a high risk for the capacity of large earthquakes. An earthquake recurrence period of roughly 1,000 years has been suggested, with the last earthquakes on that section dated at 1092 AD and 174 or 374 AD. Locking depth of the fault range from 7.1–21.8 km (4.4–13.5 mi).

=== Creeping Section ===
At the western end of the 1920 earthquake surface rupture, and between the Tianzhu seismic gap (from 37.11° N, 103.68° E to 37.00° N, 104.15° E) lies a 30–40 km (19–25 mi) section of the fault that displays a phenomenon known as an aseismic creep at shallow depths.

== Seismicity ==
The fault was the source of two very large and destructive earthquakes in 1920 and 1927. Two events in 143 A.D. or 374 A.D. and in 1092 may have been large earthquakes with estimated magnitudes of 8.0 or higher.

=== 1920 ===
On the evening of December 16, 1920, a M7.8–8.5 earthquake struck Haiyuan County, killing over 270,000 people. Shaking intensity reached a maximum of XII (Extreme), the uppermost limit on the Modified Mercalli intensity scale. The fault ruptured for a length of nearly 237 km (147 mi) in this event. Surface ruptures from the earthquake have been well documented and a maximum surface displacement of 10–11 m (33–36 ft) was recorded.

=== 1927 ===
A magnitude 7.7 quake struck Gansu Province on the morning of May 22, 1927, the earthquake occurred on a different segment from the one involved in the 1920 quake. This earthquake caused the deaths of more than 40,000 people, and 200,000 livestock. It is thought to have been produced along a south-dipping thrust fault located north of the Haiyuan Fault strand. This fault has been interpreted to be a branch of the Haiyuan Fault at depth.

=== 1990 ===
On October 20, 1990, a M_{w} 5.8 earthquake ruptured a small section of the fault with a maximum China seismic intensity of VIII. Serious damage was reported along a 27 km (17 mi) section of the fault. The earthquake produced surface fissures and cracks. The ancient walls of Songshan collapsed. No formal geological investigation was conducted although it is believed to have produced a surface rupture for several kilometers. One fatality was reported.

=== 1995 ===
The 1995 Yongden earthquake on July 21, a M_{w} 5.6 earthquake struck near Yongden County, northeast of Lanzhou. It left 14 people killed, 533 injured and 8,860 homeless. At least 11,704 homes were destroyed and a further 5,083 were extensively damaged. Serious damage occurred to road and agricultural infrastructures. Livestock and farmland were destroyed by landslides. A maximum intensity of VII was evaluated. The earthquake was the result of movement along a previously unmapped south–southwest dipping thrust fault.

=== 2022 ===
An M_{w} 6.6 or M_{s} 6.9 earthquake struck Menyuan County in January 2022, causing little damage and few minor injuries. The earthquake was felt with a maximum intensity of IX on the China seismic intensity scale (IX on the Modified Mercalli intensity scale) over a 157 km^{3} area.

It generated a 22 km (14 mi) surface rupture along the Lenglongling segment of the Haiyuan Fault. On-site investigations found up to 2.1 m (6 ft 11 in) of left-lateral strike-slip offsets. The surface rupture also crossed the tunnel of a high-speed railway linking Lanzhou to Ürümqi, causing severe damage to a bridge and the tracks. Modelling of the earthquake suggest it had a maximum coseisic slip of around 3.5 m (11 ft) at a depth of 0–10 km (0.0–6.2 mi) along the rupture.
