= Xindu, Garzê =

- Town

Tibetan transcription(s)

Chinese transcription(s)
- Interactive map of Xindu, Garzê
- Country: China
- Province: Sichuan
- Prefecture: Garzê Tibetan Autonomous Prefecture
- Time zone: UTC+8 (CST)

Xindu (Tibetan: ཤིས་མདོ་གྲོང་རྡལ།, Wylie: shis mdo grong rdal; Chinese: 新都镇; pinyin: Xīndū Zhèn) is a town in the Garzê Tibetan Autonomous Prefecture of Sichuan, China.
