= 1981 Dawu earthquake =

Earthquake in China

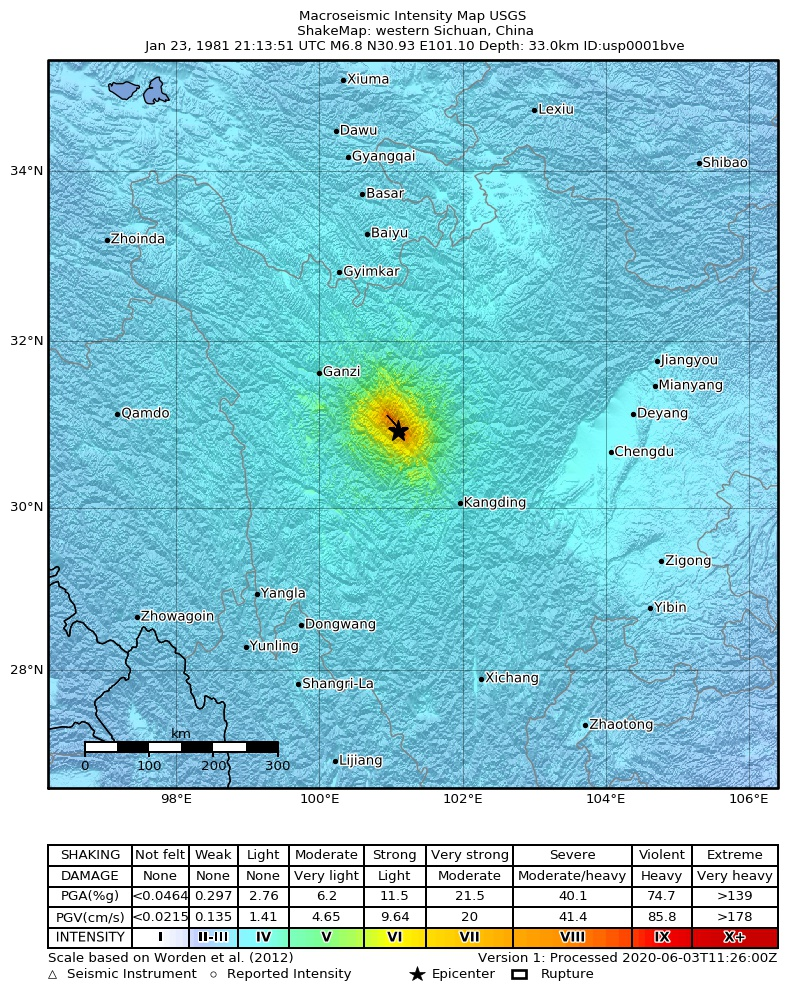
- USGS ShakeMap

- Location within Sichuan
- UTC time: 1981-01-23 21:13:50
- ISC event: 633084
- USGS-ANSS: ComCat
- Local date: January 24, 1981
- Local time: 05:13:50 CST
- Magnitude: 6.8 M_{s}
- Epicenter: 30.93°N 101.10°E
- Type: Strike-slip
- Areas affected: Sichuan, China
- Max. intensity: MMI IX (Violent)
- Casualties: About 150 dead; roughly 300 injured

The 1981 Dawu earthquake occurred on 24 January at 5:13 a.m. CST, in Sichuan, China. Registering a surface-wave magnitude of 6.8, the earthquake killed about 150 people and injured roughly 300 more. It caused comprehensive damage within close range of its epicenter.

== Background ==
China has an extensive history of catastrophic earthquakes that ranges back to 1290. The first verified earthquake took place in Chih-li, killing roughly 100,000 people. The next great earthquake was probably the 1556 Shaanxi earthquake, the most devastating earthquake of all time. Roughly 830,000 were killed by the event. Other earthquakes in 1917, 1918, 1920, 1923, 1925, 1927, 1931, 1932, 1933, 1948, 1950, 1966, 1969, 1970, 1974, 1975, 1976 each killed at least one thousand people. Since 1981, earthquake fatalities have diminished greatly, though have not been stopped. As recently as 2008, an earthquake in Sichuan killed nearly 90,000 people.

== Characteristics ==
The epicenter was pinpointed to Dawu County in Sichuan. Its official magnitude was 6.8 and its surface wave magnitude reached 6.6.

A moderately well controlled focal mechanism indicates that the earthquake was probably a result of left lateral strike-slip faulting on the Daofu fault. The Daofu fault forms part of the Xianshuihe fault system, which experienced a sequence of four earthquakes greater than 6.0 between 1973 and 1982, with each event triggering the next in the sequence by changing the stress state. A 44 km surface rupture has been reported for the 1981 earthquake.

== Damage and casualties ==
The earthquake killed roughly 150 people and 300 or so were injured. Damage was considerable, but limited to a small zone around the area.
