= Coulomb stress transfer =

Geological process relating to earthquakes

Coulomb stress transfer is a seismic-related geological process of stress changes to surrounding material caused by local discrete deformation events. Using mapped displacements of the Earth's surface during earthquakes, the computed Coulomb stress changes suggest that the stress relieved during an earthquake not only dissipates but can also move up and down fault segments, concentrating and promoting subsequent tremors. Importantly, Coulomb stress changes have been applied to earthquake-forecasting models that have been used to assess potential hazards related to earthquake activity.

== Coulomb stress change ==
The Coulomb failure criterion requires that the Coulomb stress exceeds a value σ_{f} defined by the shear stress τ_{B}, normal stress σ_{B}, pore pressure p, and coefficient of friction μ of a failure plane, such that

σ_{f} = τ_{B} – μ(σ_{B} – p)

It is also often assumed that changes in pore fluid pressure induced by changes in stress are proportional to the normal stress change across the fault plane. These effects are incorporated into an effective coefficient of friction μ’, such that

Δσ_{f} = Δτ_{B} – μ’(Δσ_{B})

This simplification allows for the calculation of Coulomb stress changes on a fault plane to be independent of the regional stress field but instead depends on the fault geometry, sense of slip, and coefficient of friction.

The significance of the Coulomb stress changes was discovered when mapped displacements of neighbouring fault movements were used to calculate Coulomb stress changes along faults. Results revealed that the stress relieved on faults during earthquakes did not simply dissipate, but also moved up and down fault segments. Moreover, mapped lobes of increased and decreased Coulomb stress around local faults exhibited increased and decreased rates of seismicity respectively shortly after neighboring earthquakes, but eventually return to their background rate over time.

== Earthquake stress triggering ==
Stress triggering describes the responsive rupturing of faults from increases in Coulomb stress caused by exogenous deformation events. Although neighboring displacements often yield small magnitude stress changes, areas of disturbed Coulomb stress states have been successfully used to explain the spatial distribution of stress triggered aftershock seismicity.

On June 28, 1992, a M7.3 earthquake that struck near Landers, California, was followed (about three hours later) by the M6.5 Big Bear foreshock earthquake 40 km away. Calculated Coulomb stress changes from both of these earthquakes showed a westward lobe of 2.1–2.9 bars of increased Coulomb stress to have resulted from the displacement associated with both earthquakes. Of the roughly 20,000 aftershocks that occurred 25 days after June 28 within a 5 km radius, more than 75% occurred in areas where Coulomb stress had increased and less than 25% occurred in areas where Coulomb stress had dropped.

Another successful case study of earthquake prediction occurred along Turkey's North Anatolian fault system. From 1939 to 1999, the Anatolian fault system had witnessed ten earthquakes of M6.6 or greater. The evolution of the Coulomb stress changes along the North Anatolian fault as a result of these earthquakes showed that 11 of the 13 ruptures occurred in areas of increased Coulomb stress caused by a previous rupture. This method has been also used to predict seismicity around active volcanoes submitted to significant variation of stress in the magma chamber.

== Earthquake prediction ==
Although no official Coulomb stress transfer prediction model is being used by government agencies, geologic surveys often analyze earthquake threats using Coulomb stress theory. As an example, the last of the previous thirteen earthquakes along Turkey's North Anatolian Fault, near the town of Duzce, was successfully predicted by local geologists before the rupture occurred. This allowed for engineers to evacuate unstable structures and limit significant damage. Scientists estimate that the probability of another earthquake along the Anatolian fault system is 62% over the next 30 years and will be located threateningly close to Istanbul.

== Examples of earthquake sequences ==
- 1703 Apennine earthquakes
- 1761 Lisbon earthquake – located on a fault under the Coral Patch Seamount adjacent to the location of the 1755 Lisbon earthquake
- 1783 Calabrian earthquakes
- 1899 Yakutat Bay earthquakes
- 1981 Dawu earthquake – part of a sequence of four along the Xianshuihe fault system
- 2001 Gujarat earthquake – fault reactivation caused by built-up stress from the 1819 Rann of Kutch earthquake
- 2005 Nias–Simeulue earthquake – triggered by the 2004 Indian Ocean earthquake 3 months prior
- 2007 Kuril Islands earthquake – normal faulting from an outer rise area next to where the 2006 Kuril Islands earthquake nucleated
- 2012 Indian Ocean earthquakes
- 2018 Sulawesi earthquake – inferred to have been related to the 1996 Sulawesi earthquake
- 2023 Turkey–Syria earthquakes
- 2026 Kumamoto earthquake – caused by the 2016 Kumamoto earthquakes that happened to the northeast
