= Altyn Tagh fault =

Coordinates: 36°00′N 92°00′E

Altyn Tagh Fault
- Location: China

Characteristics
- Length: ~2,000 km
- Displacement: 475 km

Tectonics
- Plate: Eurasian plate
- Status: Active
- Earthquakes: ~2000-3000 years ago
- Type: Sinistral strike-slip fault
- Age: Eocene-Miocene

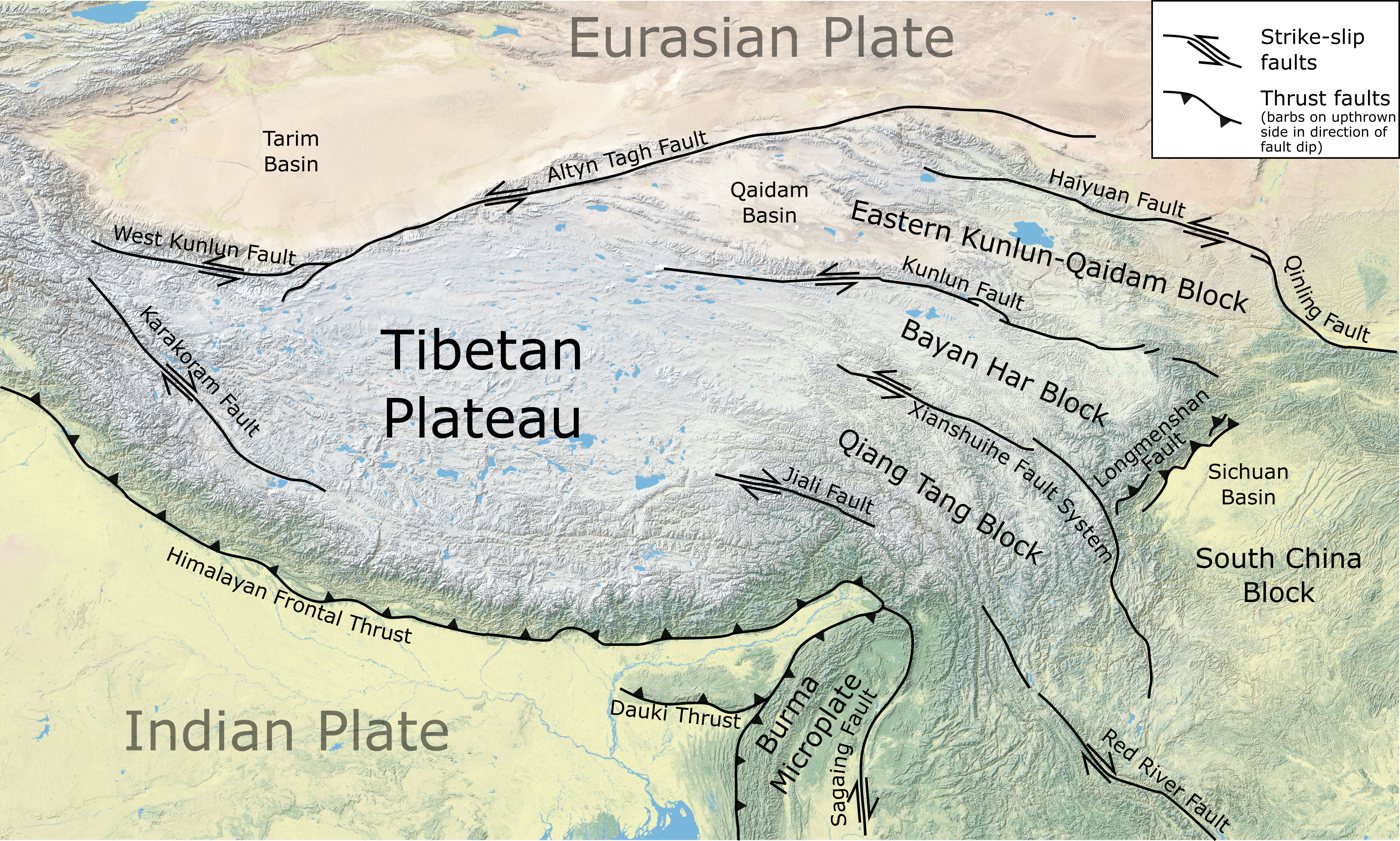
Major fault zones around the Tibetan Plateau showing location of the Altyn Tagh Fault

The Altyn Tagh Fault (ATF) is a 2,000 km long, active, sinistral (left lateral) strike-slip fault that forms the northwestern boundary of the Tibetan Plateau with the Tarim Basin. It is one of the major sinistral strike-slip structures that together help to accommodate the eastward motion of this zone of thickened crust, relative to the Eurasian plate. A total displacement of about ~475 km has been estimated for this fault zone since the middle Oligocene, although the amount of displacement, age of initiation and slip rate are disputed.

== Tectonic setting ==
The Tibetan Plateau is an area of thickened continental crust, a result of the ongoing collision of the Indo-Australian plate with the Eurasian plate. The way in which this zone accommodates the collision remains unclear with two end-member models being proposed. The first regards the crust as being made up of a mosaic of strong blocks separated by weak fault zones, the 'microplate' model. The second regards the deformation as being continuous within the mid to lower crust, the 'continuum' model. The change in width of the deformed zone along the collisional belt, with the narrow zone of western Tibet compared to the main part of the Tibetan Plateau, is explained as either lateral escape to the east along the Altyn Tagh and Karakorum faults in the microplate model or as the effect of the rigid Tarim Basin block causing heterogeneous deformation within a generally weaker lithosphere in the continuum model. The rate of displacement along the major fault zones such as the Altyn Tagh and Kunlun faults compared to the degree of distributed deformation of the intervening crust is critical to discriminating between these two models.

== Geometry ==
The Altyn Tagh Fault extends for at least 1,500 km and possibly for as much as 2,500 km from the West Kunlun thrust zone in the southwest to the edge of the Qilian Mountains in the northeast (and possibly well beyond). It is divided into three main sections: southwestern, central and northeastern. There is one major splay fault, the North Altyn Fault. The main active fault trace of the ATF lies within a zone of secondary structures that is about 100 km wide in the central section.

=== Southwestern section (west of 84°E) ===
The geometry of the southwestern section of the fault zone and how it interacts with the main shortening structures remains unclear. A direct kinematic link to the northward directed thrusts of the western Kunlun seems likely, but this is insufficient to accommodate hundreds of km of displacement on the Altyn Tagh Fault. An alternative suggestion is that the earlier part of the displacement was accommodated by the Tianshuihai backthrust belt.

=== Central section (84°E to 94°E) ===
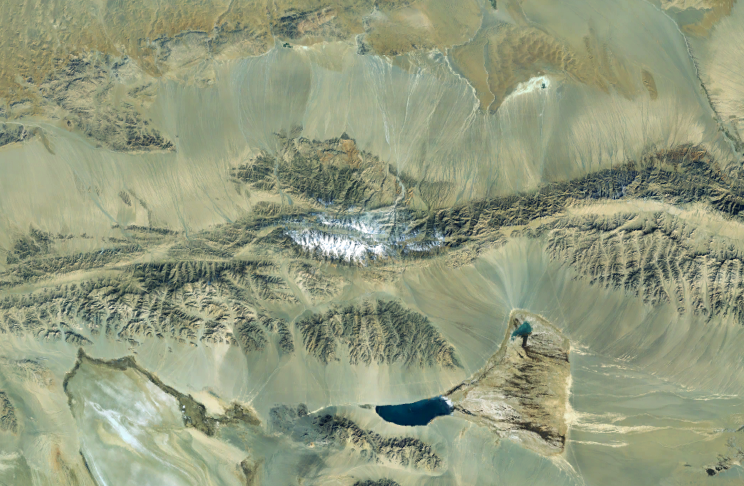
The Aksai restraining bend. The resulting uplifted area, the mountains of Altun Shan, is shown by the extent of snow cover

The central section of the fault zone consists of five slightly en echelon segments, with right-stepping offsets between them, forming four restraining bends. Each of these bends is marked by a topographic high, well above the general elevation of the area, due to the local transpressional deformation. These high points are, from west to east, the Sulamu Tagh (6245 m elevation), the Akato Tagh (~6100 m), the Pingding Shan (4780 m) and the Altun Shan (5830 m).

=== Northeastern section (east of 94°E) ===
The northeastern section of the fault zone shows increasing interaction with WNW-ESE trending structures within the eastern Kunlun Shan and the Qilian Mountains. The estimated displacement rate decreases along the northern section, suggesting that some of the displacement is transferred onto thrust structures along the south side of the Qaidam Basin. Northeast of the Qilian Mountains, a series of five or more splays of the ATF have been identified, with active slip constrained to the post-Cretaceous to pre middle Miocene time interval.

=== North Altyn Fault ===
This fault splays off from the Altyn Tagh Fault at the southwestern end of the Altyn Tagh mountains and runs along the edge of the Altyn Tagh range. It is a dominantly sinistral strike-slip structure, with some subsidiary thrusting. It is thought to extend northeastward from the end of the Altyn Tagh based on effects on drainage and bedrock ridges suggesting a linkage with the Cherchen Fault. It may have formed part of the ATF at an early stage in its development.

=== Cherchen Fault ===
The Cherchen Fault lies within the Tarim Basin and runs parallel to the Altyn Tagh Fault. It is a steep structure that shows no significant vertical offsets in the Tarim Basin and is suspected to be another sinistral strike-slip fault.

== Total displacement ==
The overall displacement along the Altyn Tagh fault has been estimated using various lines of evidence. Measurements of total left-lateral displacement since initiation for the central ATF range from 280 to 500 km on the basis of an offset tectonic terrane boundary of Paleozoic age, a Paleozoic plutonic belt, a Jurassic shoreline, Oligocene and Miocene sediments from inferred sources and reconstructions of areas with distinctive 40Ar/39Ar cooling histories.

== Late Quaternary slip rate ==
Late Quaternary slip rates have been reported along the majority of the length of the Altyn Tagh fault and include measurements from geodetic techniques (e.g., GPS surveys and InSAR), traditional paleoseismic trenching, and on the basis of offset and dated landforms (morphochronology). The majority of these studies have focused on the central portion of the Altyn Tagh fault (85° to 90° E) because the highest slip rates are expected along this portion of the fault.

Slip rates determined from elastic dislocation modeling of measurements from campaign-style GPS surveys at 90° E are 9 ± 5 mm/yr, 9 ± 4 mm/yr, and 11 ± 3 mm/yr. Results from a regional GPS network indicate differences in far-field station of 6–9 mm/yr. At 85°E, a slip rate of 11 ± 5 mm/yr was measured on the basis of elastic dislocation modeling of interferometric synthetic aperture radar (InSAR) measurements.

Morphochronologic investigations, which combine displacement and age measurements of faulted landforms such as terrace risers, alluvial fans, stream channels, and glacial moraines, have been undertaken at seven sites along the central Altyn Tagh fault, including Cherchen He (86.4°E), Kelutelage (86.7°E), Tuzidun (86.7°E), Sulamu Tagh (87.4°E), Yukuang (87.9°E), Keke Qiapu (88.1°E), and Yuemake (88.5°E). The average slip rates reported from these measurements range from 7–27 mm/yr for landforms ranging in age from ~3ka to ~113 ka.

== History ==
The formation of the Altyn Tagh fault has been variously dated as Eocene, mid-Oligocene, and Miocene. There is also evidence that the present fault follows a precursor structure, also a zone of sinistral strike-slip, that dates back to the latest Permian.

== Seismic activity ==
No major earthquakes have been recorded instrumentally along this fault zone. Paleoseismological studies using trenching have determined that 2–3 large earthquakes have occurred in the last 2–3000 years.
