= 2025 Tibet earthquake =

Earthquake in Asia

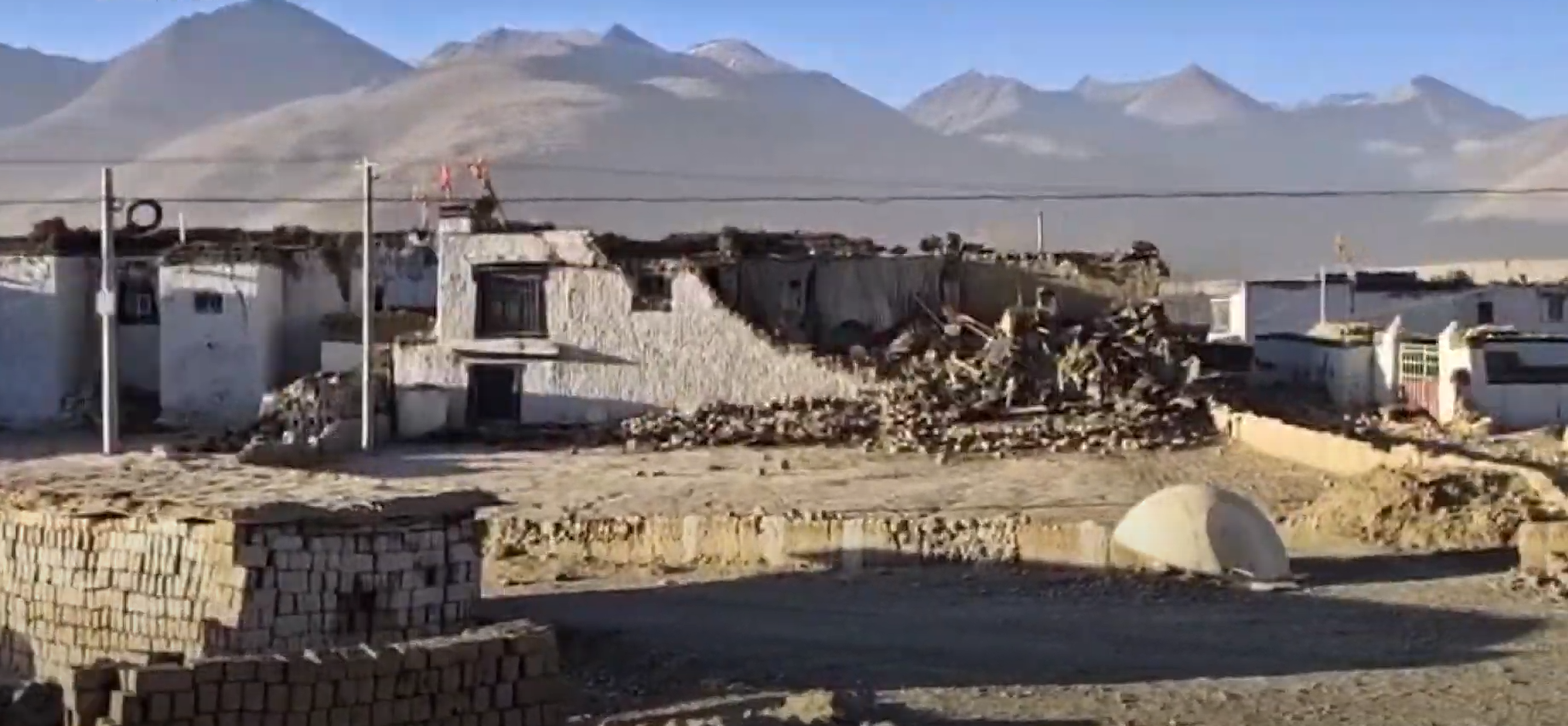
- Collapsed and damaged homes in Tingri County

- Location within China
- UTC time: 2025-01-07 01:05:16
- ISC event: 642702627
- USGS-ANSS: ComCat
- Local date: 7 January 2025
- Local time: 09:05 CST (UTC+8)
- Duration: 24 seconds
- Magnitude: M_{w} 7.1 M_{s} 6.8
- Depth: 10.0 km (6.2 mi)
- Epicenter: 28.639°N 87.361°E
- Type: Normal
- Areas affected: Southwestern China, Nepal and northern India
- Max. intensity: CSIS IX (MMI IX)
- Peak acceleration: 0.419 g
- Foreshocks: mb 4.2
- Aftershocks: 3,614 recorded Strongest: M_{ww} 5.5
- Casualties: 126 fatalities (Chinese government); 134–400 fatalities (Tibetan sources); 351 injuries

On 7 January 2025 at 09:05 CST (UTC+8), an earthquake measuring M_{w} 7.1 struck Tingri County, located in the Shigatse prefecture-level city of the Tibet Autonomous Region of Southwestern China. Between 126 and 400 people were killed (Note: Tibetan sources estimate a higher death toll than officially reported by the Chinese government due to many local sources being prohibited from spreading any information of casualties. See Casualties and Response sections for details.) and 338 were injured in the region. The earthquake also injured 13 people in Nepal and caused minor damage in Northern India. Shaking was felt across South Asia. The earthquake was the largest in China since the Maduo earthquake in May 2021 and the deadliest since at least the Jishishan earthquake in December 2023. It was caused by normal faulting and originated within the continental crust at 10 km (6.2 mi) depth.

== Tectonic setting ==
The Tibetan Plateau attains its high elevation due to crustal thickening caused by the collision of the Indian tectonic plate with the Eurasian plate, creating the Himalayas. Faulting within the plateau is associated with strike-slip and normal mechanisms. The plateau extends in an east–west direction evidenced by north–south striking grabens, strike-slip faulting and GPS data. In the northern region, strike-slip faulting constitutes the dominant style of tectonics while in the south, the dominant tectonic domain is east–west extension on north–south trending normal faults. Seven north–south trending rifts and normal faults were first discovered in southern Tibet during the late 1970s and early 1980s using satellite imagery. They began formation when extension occurred some 4 to 8 million years ago.

The largest earthquakes in Tibet, with magnitudes of 8.0 or similar, occur along strike-slip faults. Normal faulting earthquakes are smaller in magnitudes; in 2008, five normal faulting earthquakes with magnitudes of 5.9 to 7.1 occurred in various locations across the plateau. These earthquakes occurred on faults with dip angles of 40 to 50 degrees and extended to a depth of 10 to 15 km (6.2 to 9.3 mi). A 2010 study in Geophysical Journal International observed within the past 43 years that 85 percent of the seismic moment released during normal faulting earthquakes occurred in areas of more than 4.5 to 5 km (2.8 to 3.1 mi) elevation. This may suggest normal faulting earthquakes are dependent on gravitational potential energy to trigger these ruptures.

Since 1949, 37 earthquakes of M_{s} 5.0–5.9, 7 of M_{s} 6.0–6.9, and 1 of M_{s} 7.0–7.9 have been recorded within 200 km (120 mi) of the epicentre. It was the deadliest earthquake in the immediate area since a M_{s} 6.6 event occurred in Yadong County on 20 November 1980. That earthquake had an epicenter 176 km (109 mi) away and killed 3 people in the county. The 7 January 2025 earthquake was also the largest in the area since a M_{s} 7.1 struck 171 km (106 mi) to the south on 26 April 2015.

== Earthquake ==
USGS ShakeMap illustrating ground motion around the epicentre

The United States Geological Survey noted that the earthquake measured a moment magnitude (M_{w}) of 7.1, while the China Earthquake Networks Center documented its magnitude at M_{s} 6.8. The shock occurred at 10 km (6.2 mi) depth, indicating it occurred within the continental crust that forms the Tibetan Plateau. It was caused by normal faulting with a minor strike-slip component. Focal mechanism solutions indicate that the rupture occurred on a north–south striking fault, dipping moderately to either the east or west. The epicentre was at Tsogo Township in Tingri County, an area with an average altitude of 4,500 m (14,800 ft).

Modelling of the rupture by the United States Geological Survey revealed motion along a north–northeast striking fault dipping west–northwest or north–northwest striking fault dipping east–northeast. In both solutions, co-seismic slip occurred for about 80 km (50 mi) along strike and extended to 20 km (12 mi) depth. The maximum slip in these solutions were 1.6 m (5 ft 3 in) and 1.3 m (4 ft 3 in), respectively. A rupture area of about 80 km (50 mi) x 20 km (12 mi) was estimated, extending from Ngamring County to southern Tingri County near the border with Nepal. Seismologists at the China Earthquake Networks Center said the mainshock originated within the Lhasa terrane, a crustal block that forms part of the plateau.

InSAR analysis of before and after images from the European Space Agency Sentinel 1A satellite shows evidence of subsidence to the west of the surface rupture and uplift to the east. Combined with the observed focal mechanism, these observations confirm that this earthquake was caused by normal faulting on a west-dipping fault. The causative fault has been identified as the Deng Me Cuo Fault.

The China Earthquake Administration evaluated that the entire rupture occurred within 24 seconds, releasing a seismic moment estimated at 4.0469 × 10^{19} Nm. The greatest moment release occurred 14 seconds after the rupture initiated. The rupture propagated bilaterally along a normal fault, but most of it was directed northward. Remote sensing and ground surveys indicated a surface rupture of 25–32 km (16–20 mi) and maximum displacement of 3 m (9.8 ft). About 11 km (6.8 mi) of the rupture was along the eastern shore of Dengme Co Lake, where field surveysors discovered a 100 m (330 ft) wide zone of fissures and some sinistral displacement. The remaining rupture continued towards the north of the lake. The Ministry of Natural Resources projected a 50 km (31 mi) rupture extending to 16 km (9.9 mi) depth by using seismic inversion of InSAR data. Much of the coseismic slip occurred at 1 to 5 km (0.62 to 3.11 mi) depth and a maximum slip of 6 m (20 ft) was Inferred at 1 to 2 km (0.62 to 1.24 mi) depth. In Changsuo Township vertical scarps of 3 m (9.8 ft) were measured along a zone of ruptures nearly 4 km (2.5 mi) long at 5,300 to 5,500 m (17,400 to 18,000 ft) elevation.

In a survey by the China Earthquake Administration, intensity VI or higher on the China seismic intensity scale was felt for more than 23,986 km^{2} (9,261 sq mi) along a general north–south trend. A 411 km^{2} (159 sq mi) area was assigned IX including Changsuo, Quluo, Cuoguo, Nixia and Jiacuo townships. Intensity VIII formed a band around the meizoseismal area for 869 km^{2} (336 sq mi) which encompassed 8 townships. Twenty townships across Tingri, Lhazi, Dinggye, Sakya and Angren counties were within the VII isoseismal band that was assigned to a 5,350 km^{2} (2,070 sq mi) area. At least 3,614 aftershocks followed the mainshock by 14 January.

== Impact ==
=== Casualties ===
The death toll is heavily disputed, with the Government of China providing its current official figure of 126 deaths on 8 January, based on search operations in 27 villages comprising 6,900 people within 20 km (12 mi) of the earthquake epicenter. Due to the lack of revisions, transparency, and censorship by the government, local Tibetans heavily criticized this figure, instead estimating 265 fatalities. Chinese authorities refuted this figure as a rumor and imposed administrative punishment on some locals for spreading "misinformation" online. Voice of America Tibet put the death toll at 134, citing data received from Tibet and confirmed by reliable sources. On 11 January, Radio Free Asia reported more than 400 fatalities, an estimate they cited from staff working at morgues in Tingri and Lhatse counties.

At least 338 people were wounded, including 19 in serious condition. Local officials attributed the casualties to the collapse of poorly constructed traditional buildings. On 8 January, rescuers said an unknown number of people remained missing as Chinese officials had not provided a figure. The following day, officials said that any remaining missing persons would have likely died of hypothermia beneath the rubble of destroyed homes. Fatalities occurred in Tingri, Lhatse and Sa'gya Counties.

=== Damage ===
More than 27,200 buildings were damaged and 3,612 homes collapsed. In some villages, 80 to 90 percent of homes were razed. More than 1,000 homes collapsed in Tingri County, and five sections of national and provincial roads were damaged by landslides, collapses and subsidence. Altogether, 206 villages across 26 townships in five counties were affected. In Dramtso, 100 died, including two nuns due to a convent collapse and 30 more in Gurong village, where all homes were damaged, half of them severely. In Lhatse County, debris covered streets and vehicles, and a hotel was damaged. More than 170 China Mobile stations were disabled by the earthquake, although mobile services were restored nine hours later. Cracks were discovered in five hydropower dams after they were inspected, and three were drained. At one dam in Tingri County, a tilted wall prompted 1,500 residents across six villages to evacuate.

In Nepal, 13 people were injured, including 11 in Bara, and one each from Kavrepalanchok and Kathmandu. Two homes were destroyed, and 12 others and a police station were damaged across the country. Near the base camp of Mount Everest, a climber on the mountain's Nepalese side saw avalanches. In the Samastipur district of Bihar, India, several homes were slightly damaged. In Bhutan, two avalanches occurred above the Bechung glacier on a mountain in Lunana.

The earthquake was widely felt in much of South Asia. In Kathmandu, about 400 km (250 mi) from the epicentre, residents fled their homes. Strong shaking was felt near Mount Everest, including Lobuche and Namche, Thimphu in Bhutan, and the northern Indian states of Bihar, Assam, and West Bengal. Shaking was also felt in Dhaka, Bangladesh and other parts of the country.

On 13 January, two aftershocks measuring M_{s} 4.9 and M_{s} 5.0 caused some houses to collapse in Tingri County.

== Response ==
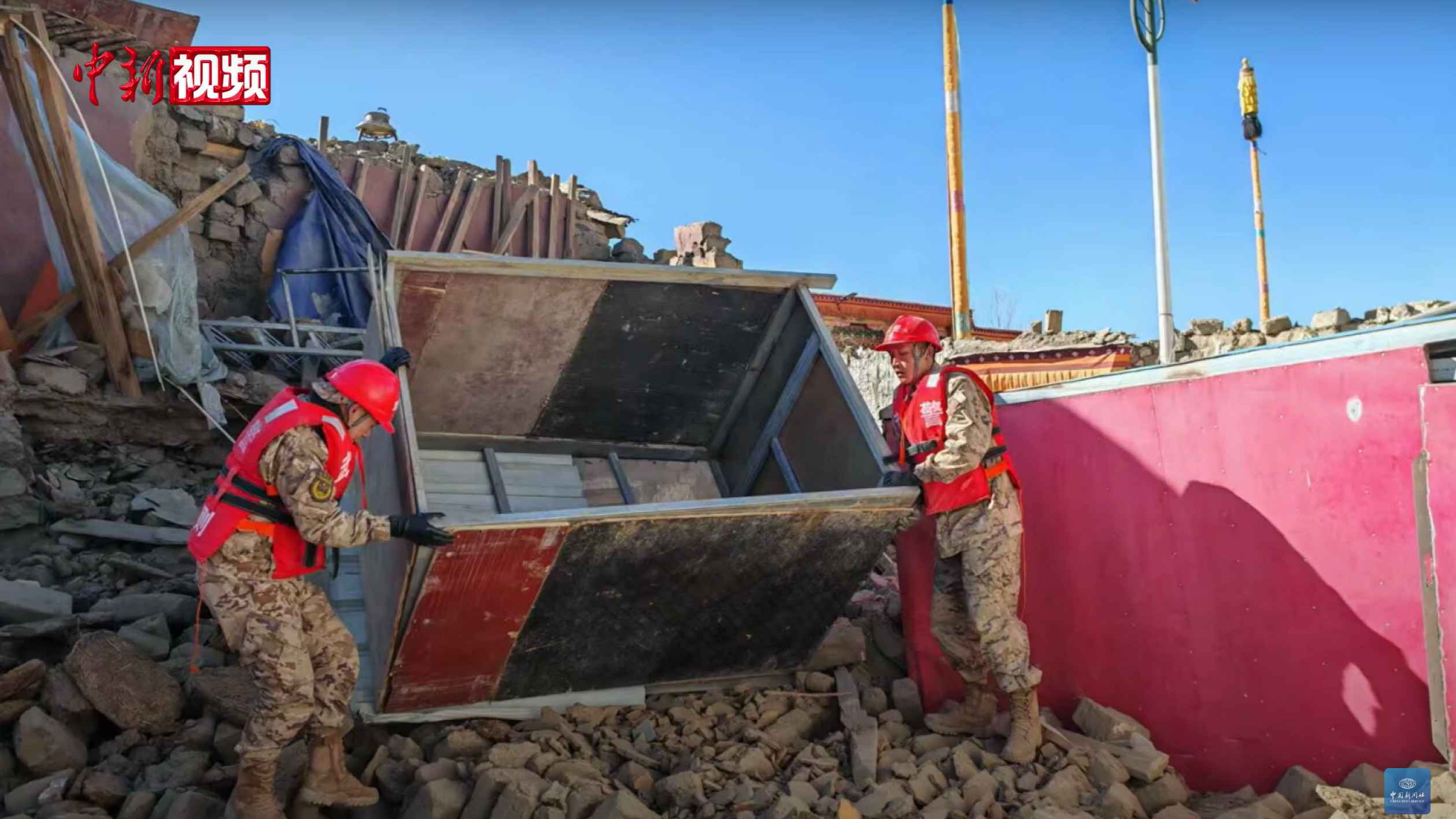
Firefighters and rescuers at the earthquake rescue site in Shigatse

Following the earthquake, more than 14,000 rescue personnel, 340 medical workers, 75 vehicles, four search dogs and 7,030 sets of equipment were dispatched to the epicentre. The China Meteorological Administration issued a level-three emergency alert for the area. To prevent further casualties during potential aftershocks, residents were evacuated. Local officials also allocated resources from the transport, water and village administrative departments to aid in rescue efforts. The State Council's Earthquake Relief Command and the Ministry of Emergency Management, in conjunction with the National Food and Strategic Reserves Administration, distributed 22,000 units of centralised relief supplies, including cotton tents, cotton coats, quilts, and folding beds, as well as specialised relief materials for high-cold and high-altitude regions to the affected areas. The national air force also participated in rescue efforts and sent drones to the area. Air cargo, medical services, ground forces, and helicopters of the Western Theater Command Air Force were deployed.

Temperatures in the area at the time of the earthquake were estimated to have been −8 °C (18 °F), and were expected to fall to −16 °C (3 °F) by night. The Western Theater Command of the People's Liberation Army was also mobilised to assist in relief efforts. The China Center for Resources Satellite Data and Application deployed eight satellites to monitor the area. The Mount Qomolangma scenic area was temporarily closed and 530 visitors were evacuated.

Xi Jinping, the General Secretary of the Chinese Communist Party, "ordered all-out rescue efforts". He urged the relevant bodies to treat the injured, repair damaged infrastructure, and relocate those displaced. The Chinese government said it would allocate 100 million yuan ($13.6 million) for disaster relief. In Nepal, security forces were deployed to areas affected by the earthquake.

At 14:00 on 7 January, 30 officers and soldiers from the People's Armed Police Tibet Corps arrived in the earthquake-affected region of Shigatse, while 359 other officers and soldiers hastened to the disaster zone. By the evening, China Central Television reported that more than 400 people were rescued, 14 housing areas were established, and at least 30,400 were relocated. All damaged roads were also reopened. The initial consignment of over 5,800 cotton tents, garments, quilts, and other central relief supplies has reached the earthquake-affected regions of Tingri County, while the remaining more than 16,000 central relief items arrived in the disaster-impacted areas on 8 January. More than 748,000 tonnes of food aid were also delivered.

On 9 January, authorities concluded the first round of the search while prioritizing the displaced, which grew to 61,500 people. Missing numbers were expected but unknown, but experts believed that the chances of survival for those still trapped in the high-elevation and harsh environment were very slim after 48 hours due to hypothermia. The second round of the search was initiated on 9 January. Authorities opened the La'ang Reservoir in Changsuo Township in Tingri County as a precaution, resulting in the evacuation of 1,500 people from six villages downstream. By 31 January, 7,733 makeshift houses and 9,941 tents had been built to house 47,787 affected residents.

== Reactions ==
The 11th Panchen Lama, Gyaincain Norbu, held a donation drive with around 900 monks from Tashi Lhunpo Monastery in Shigatse that raised nearly 1.5 million yuan ($208,660). Pieces of AI-generated images circulated on Chinese social media, and one netizen from Qinghai was placed in administrative detention for spreading AI image misinformation.

The 14th Dalai Lama, Tibet's exiled spiritual leader, said he was "deeply saddened" over the earthquake and offered prayers for the victims. He held a memorial service for the victims in India's Karnataka state on 9 January, while members of the Tibetan community also held a candle-light vigil in Dharamsala.

== See also ==
- List of earthquakes in 2025
- List of earthquakes in China
- List of earthquakes in Nepal
- 2008 Damxung earthquake
