= List of earthquakes in China =

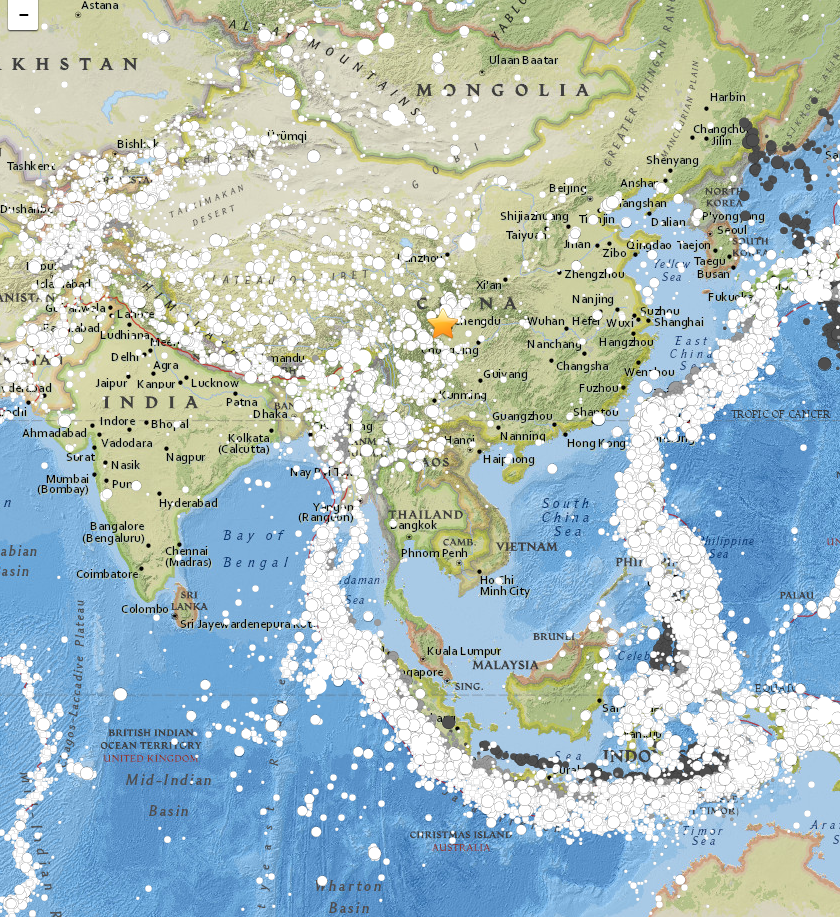
Earthquakes with a magnitude 4.5 and over (1900–2015). The yellow star is the 2008 Sichuan earthquake.

This is a list of earthquakes in China, part of the series of lists of disasters in China. Earthquakes in the Loess plateau where residents lived in yaodong caves tended to have big casualties, including the 1303 Hongdong and 1920 Haiyuan earthquakes. The most recent earthquake with a death toll of more than a thousand was the 2010 Yushu earthquake, which killed 2,968.

The collision of India with the rest of Asia has led to seismic activity throughout Western China, particularly in Tibet and the Yunnan, Xinjiang, Sichuan, Gansu and Qinghai provinces. However, these regions in comparison with Eastern China have a low population density. These areas also in general have poorer transport and building codes. Throughout China, poor building codes increases the damage and loss of life from earthquakes. The northern regions of Eastern China are not as seismically active as the western areas of the country, but earthquakes are still possible in this area.

Earthquake prediction was popular between 1966 and 1976, which overlapped with the Cultural Revolution. This reached its height with the successful prediction of the 1975 Haicheng earthquake. This earthquake had a prominent series of foreshocks and authorities who were eager to issue a warning. However very few earthquakes have both these criteria. The unpredictable and devastating 1976 Tangshan earthquake led to a reduction in the popularity of earthquake prediction in China.

== Earthquakes ==
Date	Article	Coord	Location	Mag	Deaths	Description
c. 1920 BC	Jishi Gorge outburst flood	35°N 102°E	Qinghai / Gansu			
512-05-21	512 Shaanxi earthquake	38.9°N 112.8°E	Dai County, Shaanxi	7.5 M_{s}	5,310 (estimate)	
1038-01-09	1038 Dingxiang earthquake	38.40°N 112.92°E	Dingxiang County, Shaanxi	7.25 M_{s}	32,300	
1290-09-27	1290 Zhili earthquake	41.5°N 119.3°E	Ningcheng County, Inner Mongolia	6.8 M_{s}	100,000	
1303-09-25	1303 Hongdong earthquake	36.3°N 111.7°E	Shaanxi	8.0 M_{L}	270,000	Taiyuan and Pingyang were leveled.
1337-09-08	1337 Huailai earthquake	40.4°N 115.7°E	Hebei, Beijing	6.5 M_{s}		.
1536-03-20	1536 Xichang earthquake	28.1°N 102.1°E	Sichuan	7.5	thousands	
1556-01-23	1556 Shaanxi earthquake	34.50°N 109.30°E	Shaanxi	8.0 - 8.3 M_{w}	100,000+	Population decreased by additional 730,000 due to emigration, plagues, and famine.
1604-12-29	1604 Quanzhou earthquake	23.54°N 117.24°E	Fujian	8.0 - 8.3 M_{w}	Unknown	Largest earthquake in southern China
1605-07-13	1605 Guangdong earthquake	19.9°N 110.5°E	Guangdong	7.5 M_{s}	several thousand	
1622-10-25	1622 North Guyuan earthquake	36.5°N 106.3°E	Ningxia	7.2 M_{w}	12,000	
1626-06-28	1626 Lingqiu earthquake	39.4°N 114.2°E	Shaanxi	7.0 M_{s}	>5,200	
1668-07-25	1668 Tancheng earthquake	34.30°N 118.60°E	Tancheng County, Shandong	7.7 M_{w} or 8.5 M_{w}	50,000	Largest seismic event ever recorded in history in eastern China.
1679-09-02	1679 Sanhe-Pinggu earthquake	40°00′N 116°59′E	Hebei, Beijing	8.0 M_{w}	45,500	
1695-05-18	1695 Linfen earthquake	36.0°N 111.5°E	Linfen	7.8 M_{s}	52,600	
1709-10-14	1709 Zhongwei earthquake	37.4°N 105.3°E	Ningxia	7.5 M_{s}	2,032	
1718-06-19	1718 Tongwei–Gansu earthquake	35.0°N 105.2°E	Gansu	7.5 M_{s}	75,000	
1733-08-02	1733 Dongchuan earthquake	26.2°N 103.1°E	Yunnan	7.75 M_{s}	thousands	
1738-12-23	1738 Dangjiang earthquake	33.3°N 96.6°E	Qinghai	7.6 M_{s}	336	
1739-01-04	1739 Yinchuan–Pingluo earthquake	38.9°N 106.5°E	Ningxia	8.0 M_{s}	50,000	
1786-06-01	1786 Kangding-Luding earthquake	29.9°N 102.0°E	Sichuan	7.75 M_{L}	100,000+	The earthquake triggered a landslide that formed an artificial mud dam which blocked the Dadu River. Ten days later, this dam was breached resulting in a catastrophic mudslide flooding event.
1815-10-23	1815 Pinglu earthquake	34.8°N 111.2°E	Shanxi	6.8 M_{s}	13,000	
1830-11-10	1830 Cixian earthquake	36.4°N 114.2°E	Hebei	7.4 M_{w}	7,477	
1833-09-06	1833 Kunming earthquake	25°24′N 103°00′E	Yunnan	8.0 M_{w}	6,000	
1850-09-12	1850 Xichang earthquake	27.8°N 102.3°E	Sichuan	7.6–7.9 M_{w}	20,650	
1870-04-11	1870 Batang earthquake	30.0°N 99.1°E	Sichuan	7.3 M_{w}	5,000	
1879-07-01	1879 Gansu earthquake	33.2°N 104.7°E	Gansu	8.0 M_{s}	22,000	
1902-08-22	1902 Turkestan earthquake	40.0°N 77.0°E	Xinjiang	7.7 M_{w}	2,500-20,000	
1906-12-22	1906 Manasi earthquake	44.3°N 85.6°E	Xinjiang	8.0 M_{w}	280	
1912-12-21	1913 Eshan earthquake	24.26°N 102.83°E	Eshan, Yunnan	6.8 M_{w}	942+	
1918-02-13	1918 Shantou earthquake	23.54°N 117.24°E	Shantou, Guangdong	7.2 M_{w}	1,000+	
1920-12-16	1920 Haiyuan earthquake	36.50°N 105.70°E	Haiyuan County, Ningxia	7.8 M_{L}	265,000	
1923-03-24	1923 Renda earthquake	31.295°N 100.750°E	Luhuo County, Sichuan	7.0 M_{s}	4,800	
1925-03-16	1925 Dali earthquake	25.7°N 100.4°E	Dali, Yunnan	7.0 M_{s}	5,000	
1927-05-23	1927 Gulang earthquake	37.39°N 102.31°E	Gulang County, Gansu	7.6 M_{w}	40,900	
1931-08-10	1931 Fuyun earthquake	47.1°N 89.8°E	Fuyun County, Xinjiang	8.0 M_{w}	10,000	
1932-12-25	1932 Changma earthquake	39.7°N 96.7°E	Gansu	7.6 M_{s}	275	
1933-08-25	1933 Diexi earthquake	32.0°N 103.7°E	Mao County, Sichuan	7.5 M_{S}	9,000	
1937-07-31	1937 Heze earthquakes	35.269°N 115.190°E	Mudan District, Shandong	6.9 M_{S}	3,252+	
1950-08-15	1950 Assam–Tibet earthquake	28.36°N 96.45°E	Zayü County, Tibet	8.6 M_{w}	4,000	Largest seismic event ever recorded in China and largest known seismic event on land. 3,300 deaths in Chinese-claimed territories
1952-08-18	1952 Damxung earthquake	30°38′53″N 91°36′4″E	Damxung, Tibet	7.5 M_{w}	54	
1955-04-14	1955 Kangding earthquake	31.295°N 100.750°E	Sichuan	7.1 M_{w}		
1955-09-23	1955 Yuzha earthquake	26.60°N 101.80°E	Yunnan	6.8 M_{S}	728	
1966-03-08	1966 Xingtai earthquakes	37°04′N 114°29′E	Hebei	6.8 M_{w}	8,064	
1969-07-26	1969 Yangjiang earthquake	21.61°N 111.83°E	Yangjiang, Guangdong	6.4 M_{w}	3,000	
1970-01-04	1970 Tonghai earthquake	24.19°N 102.54°E	Tonghai County, Yunnan	7.1 M_{w}	15,621	
1973-02-06	1973 Luhuo earthquake	31.398°N 100.581°E	Luhuo County, Sichuan	7.5 M_{S}	2,175	
1974-05-10	1974 Zhaotong earthquake	28.2°N 104.0°E	Zhaotong, Yunnan	6.8	20,000	
1975-02-04	1975 Haicheng earthquake	40.66°N 122.68°E	Haicheng, Liaoning	7.4 M_{w}	2,041	one of the few earthquakes to be successfully predicted throughout history
1976-05-29	1976 Longling earthquake	24.49°N 98.96°E	Yunnan	6.9 M_{S} 7.0 M_{S}	98	Doublet earthquake
1976-07-27	1976 Tangshan earthquake	39.63°N 118.10°E	Tangshan, Hebei	7.5 M_{w}	300,000+	Deadliest earthquake in Chinese history. Among the top disasters in China by death toll.
1976-08-16	1976 Songpan-Pingwu earthquake	32.69°N 104.2°E	Sichuan	7.2 M_{S}	41	Earthquake swarm
1981-01-23	1981 Dawu earthquake	30.93°N 101.10°E	Sichuan	6.8 M_{L}	150	
1988-11-06	1988 Lancang–Gengma earthquakes	22.789°N 99.611°E	Yunnan	7.6 M_{s} 7.2 M_{s}	939	Occurred near the border with Shan State, Myanmar. Doublet earthquake
1990-04-26	1990 Gonghe earthquake	35.986°N 100.245°E	Qinghai	7.0 M_{S}	126	
1996-02-03	1996 Lijiang earthquake	27.30°N 100.29°E	Yunnan	7.0 M_{S}	309	
2000-01-14	2000 Yunnan earthquake	25.61°N 101.06°E	Yunnan	5.9 M_{w}	7	
2001-02-23	2001 Sichuan earthquake	29.513°N 101.129°E	Sichuan	5.6 M_{w}	3	
2001-11-14	2001 Kunlun earthquake	36.12°N 90.54°E	Qinghai	7.8 M_{w}	0	
2003-02-24	2003 Bachu earthquake	39.61°N 77.24°E	Maralbexi (Bachu) County, Xinjiang	6.3 M_{w}	261	
2003-12-01	2003 Zhaosu earthquake	42.905°N 80.515°E	Zhaosu County, Xinjiang	6.0 M_{w}	10	
2005-11-26	2005 Ruichang earthquake	29.657°N 115.717°E	Ruichang, Jiangxi	5.2 M_{w}	14	
2006-07-22	2006 Yanjin earthquake	27.992°N 104.215°E	Yunnan	5.2 M_{w}	22	Moderate damage
2008-05-12	2008 Sichuan earthquake	31.021°N 103.367°E	Wenchuan County, Sichuan	7.9 M_{w}	87,587	18th deadliest earthquake of all time
2008-08-21	2008 Yingjiang earthquakes	24.9°N 97.8°E	Yunnan	6.0M_{w}	5	
2008-08-30	2008 Panzhihua earthquake	26.2°N 101.9°E	Sichuan	5.7 M_{w}	41	
2008-10-06	2008 Damxung earthquake	29.45°N 90.187°E	Damxung County, Tibet	6.4 M_{w}	10	
2010-04-14	2010 Yushu earthquake	33.3°N 96.7°E	Yushu, Qinghai	6.9 M_{w}	2,698	270 missing
2011-03-10	2011 Yunnan earthquake	24.710°N 97.994°E	Yunnan	5.4 M_{w}	26	
2012-09-07	2012 Yunnan earthquakes	27.582°N 103.990°E	Yiliang County, Yunnan	5.6 M_{w}	81	
2013-03-03	2013 Yunnan earthquakes	25.919°N 99.725°E	Dali, Yunnan	5.5 M_{w}	0	2,500 houses were damaged
2013-04-20	2013 Ya'an earthquake	30.284°N 102.956°E	Lushan County, Sichuan	6.9 M_{w}	196	21 missing
2013-07-22	2013 Dingxi earthquake	34.5°N 104.2°E	Min County, Gansu	5.9 M_{w}	95	Magnitude M(s)6.6 according to CENC.
2013-08-31	2013 Yunnan earthquake	28.220°N 99.343°E	Deqen, Yunnan	5.8 M_{w}	5	
2014-05-24	2014 Yingjiang earthquake	25.0°N 97.8°E	Yingjiang County, Yunnan	5.6 M_{w}	0	9,412 homes were destroyed.
2014-08-03	2014 Ludian earthquake	27.245°N 103.427°E	Ludian County, Yunnan	6.1 M_{w}	617	112 missing
2017-08-08	2017 Jiuzhaigou earthquake	33.20°N 103.82°E	Jiuzhaigou County, Sichuan	6.5 M_{w}	29	Landslides
2019-06-17	2019 Sichuan earthquake	28.405°N 104.957°E	Changning County, Sichuan	5.8 M_{w}	13	20,000 houses were damaged
2020-01-19	2020 Kashgar earthquake	39.835°N 77.108°E	Jiashi County, Xinjiang	6.0 M_{w}	1	2 injured, 1,000 houses damaged
2020-05-18	2020 Qiaojia earthquake	27.266°N 103.288°E	Qiaojia County, Yunnan	5.1 M_{w}	4	24 injured, extensive damage
2021-05-21	2021 Dali earthquake	25.761°N 100.008°E	Dali, Yunnan	6.1 M_{w}	3	32 injured, 12,882 houses damaged
2021-05-22	2021 Maduo earthquake	34.586°N 98.255°E	Madoi, Qinghai	7.3 M_{w}	20	19 people injured (official), 20 dead 300 injured (unofficial)
2021-08-16	2021 Luxian earthquake	29.194°N 105.374°E	Lu, Sichuan	5.4 M_{w}	3	146 injured, 60,000 evacuated
2022-01-07	2022 Menyuan earthquake	37.811°N 101.275°E	Menyuan, Qinghai	6.6 M_{w}	0	Limited damage, 9 injured
2022-06-01	2022 Ya'an earthquake	30.416°N 102.989°E	Lushan County, Sichuan	5.9 M_{w}	4	
2022-09-05	2022 Luding earthquake	29.726°N 102.279°E	Kangding, Sichuan	6.6 M_{w}	93	30 missing, 423 injured
2023-12-18	2023 Jishishan earthquake	35.743°N 102.827°E	Jishishan, Gansu	5.9 M_{w}	151	982 injured
2024-01-22	2024 Uqturpan earthquake	41.269°N 78.649°E	Uqturpan County, Xinjiang	7.0 M_{w}	3	74 injured
2025-01-07	2025 Tibet earthquake	28.639°N 87.361°E	Tingri County, Shigatse	7.1 M_{w}	126	351 injured
2026-05-18	2026 Liuzhou earthquakes	24.38°N 109.26°E	Liuzhou, Guangxi	5.1 M_{w}	2	6 injured
2026-10-22	2026 Nagqu earthquake	32.380°N 93.780°E	Nagqu, Tibet	7.0 M_{w}	16	54 injured
Note: The inclusion criteria for adding events are based on WikiProject Earthquakes' notability guideline that was developed for stand alone articles. The principles described also apply to lists. In summary, only damaging, injurious, or deadly events should be recorded.

M_{L} = Richter scale
M_{w} = Moment magnitude
mb = Body wave magnitude
M_{s} = Surface-wave magnitude

== Gallery ==
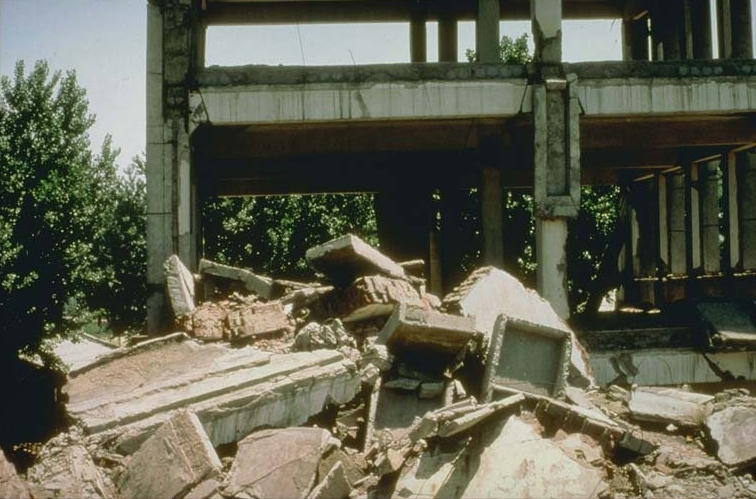
1976 Tangshan earthquake

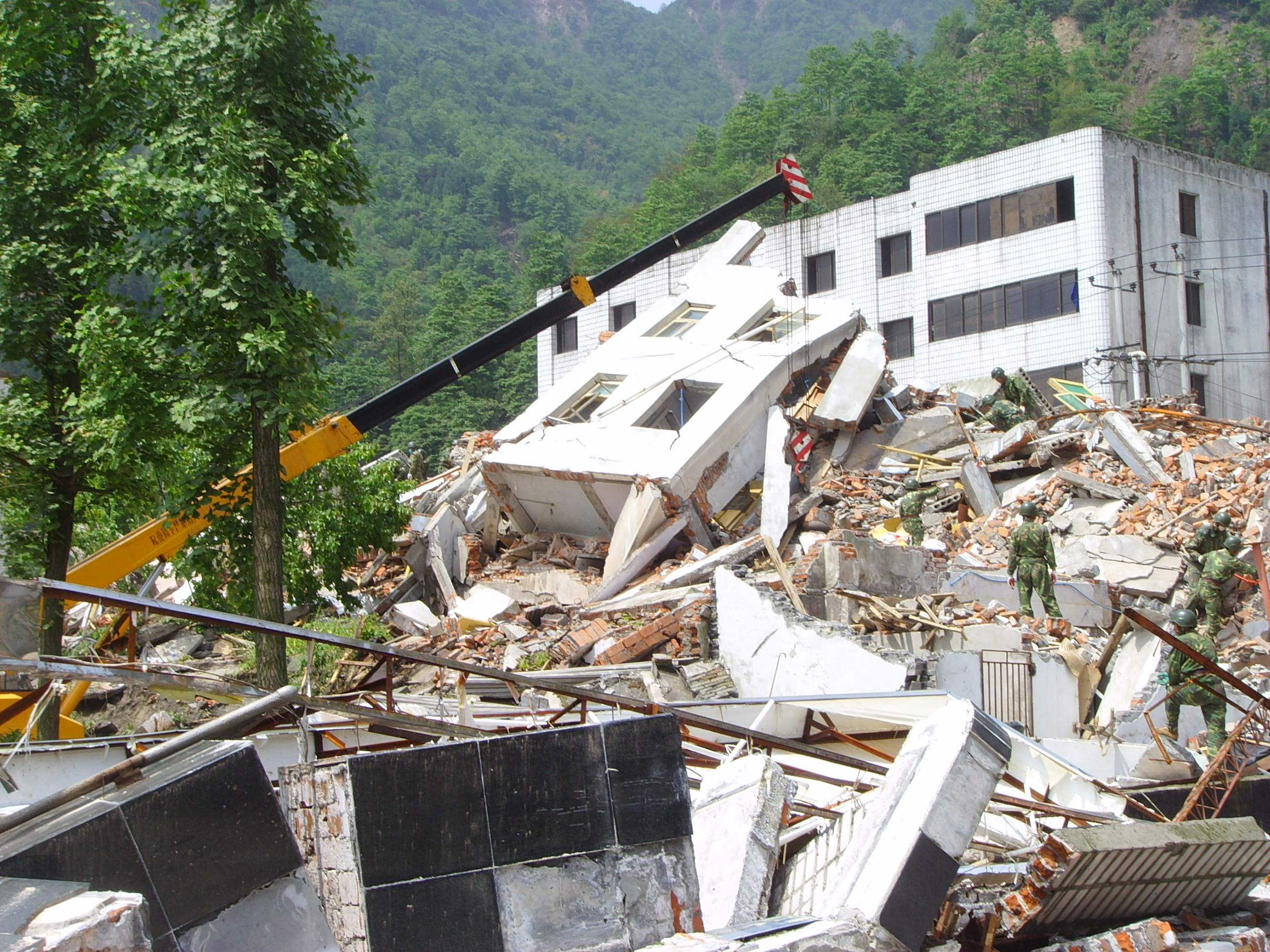
2008 Sichuan earthquake

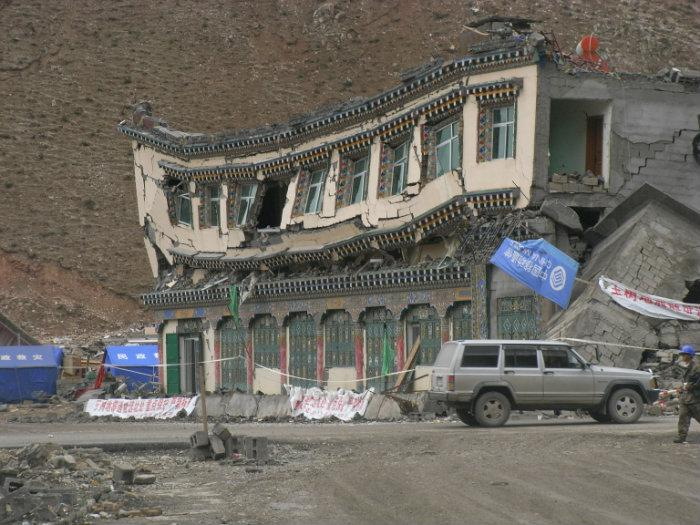
2010 Yushu earthquake

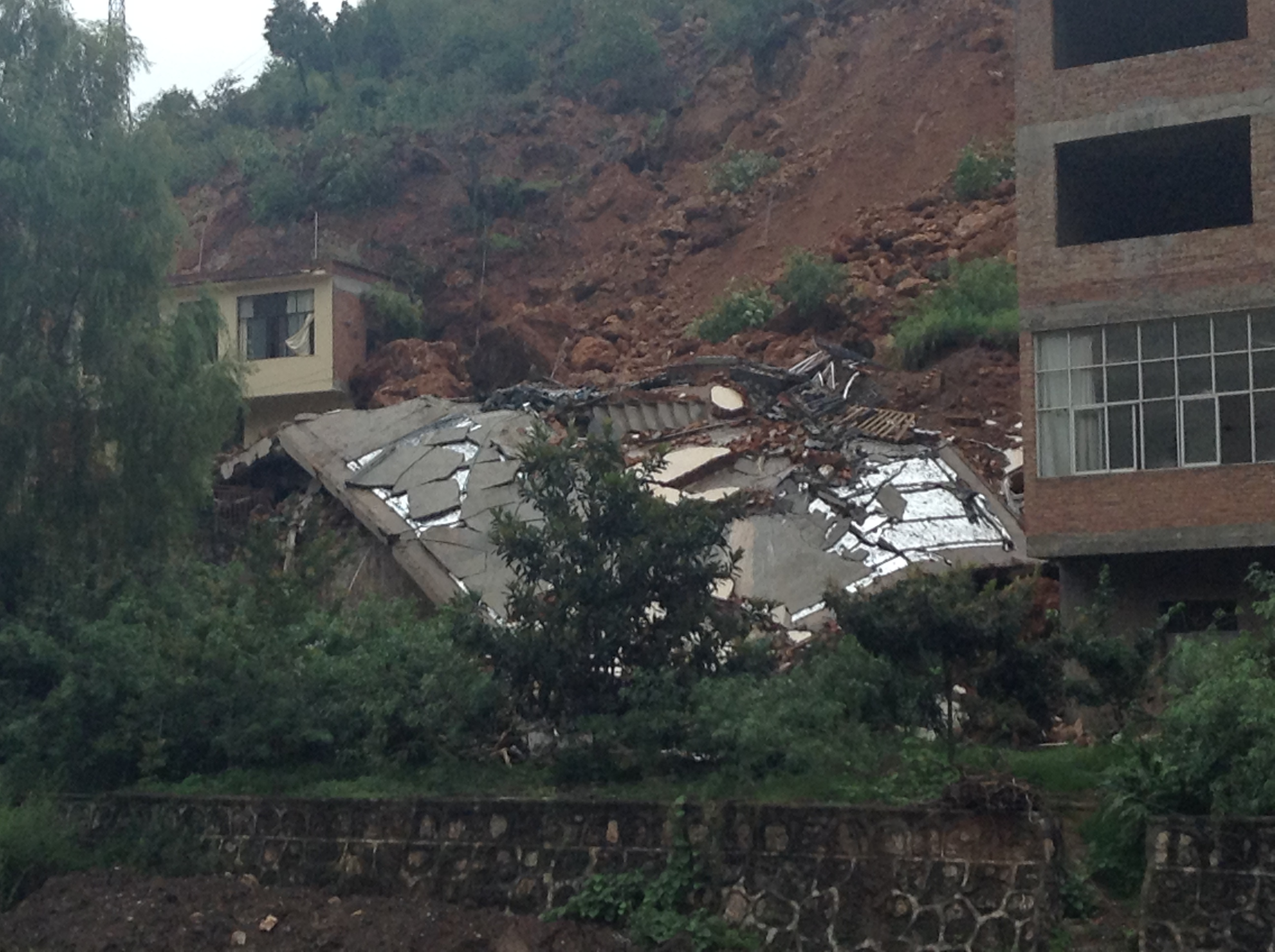
2014 Ludian earthquake

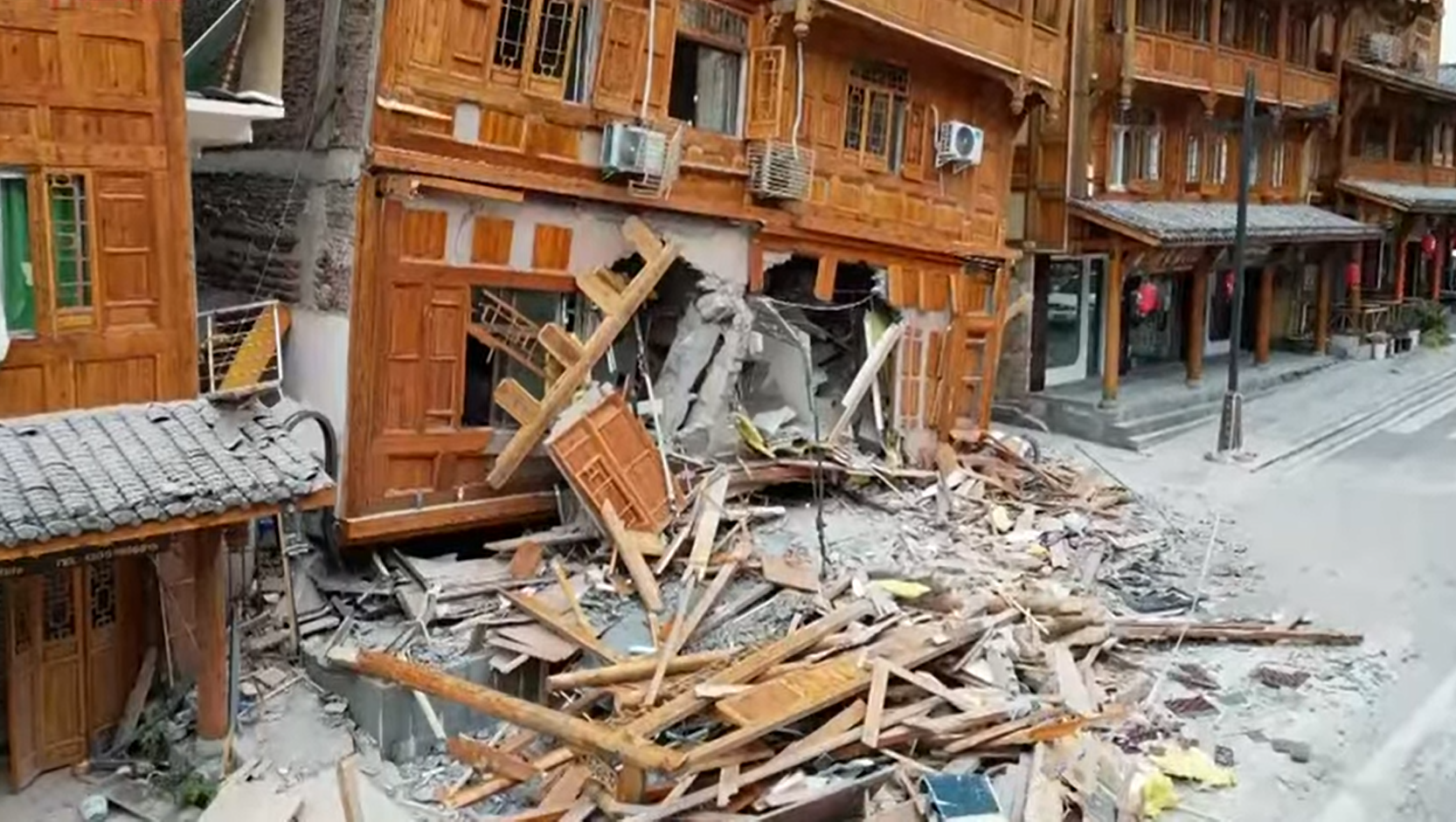
2022 Luding earthquake

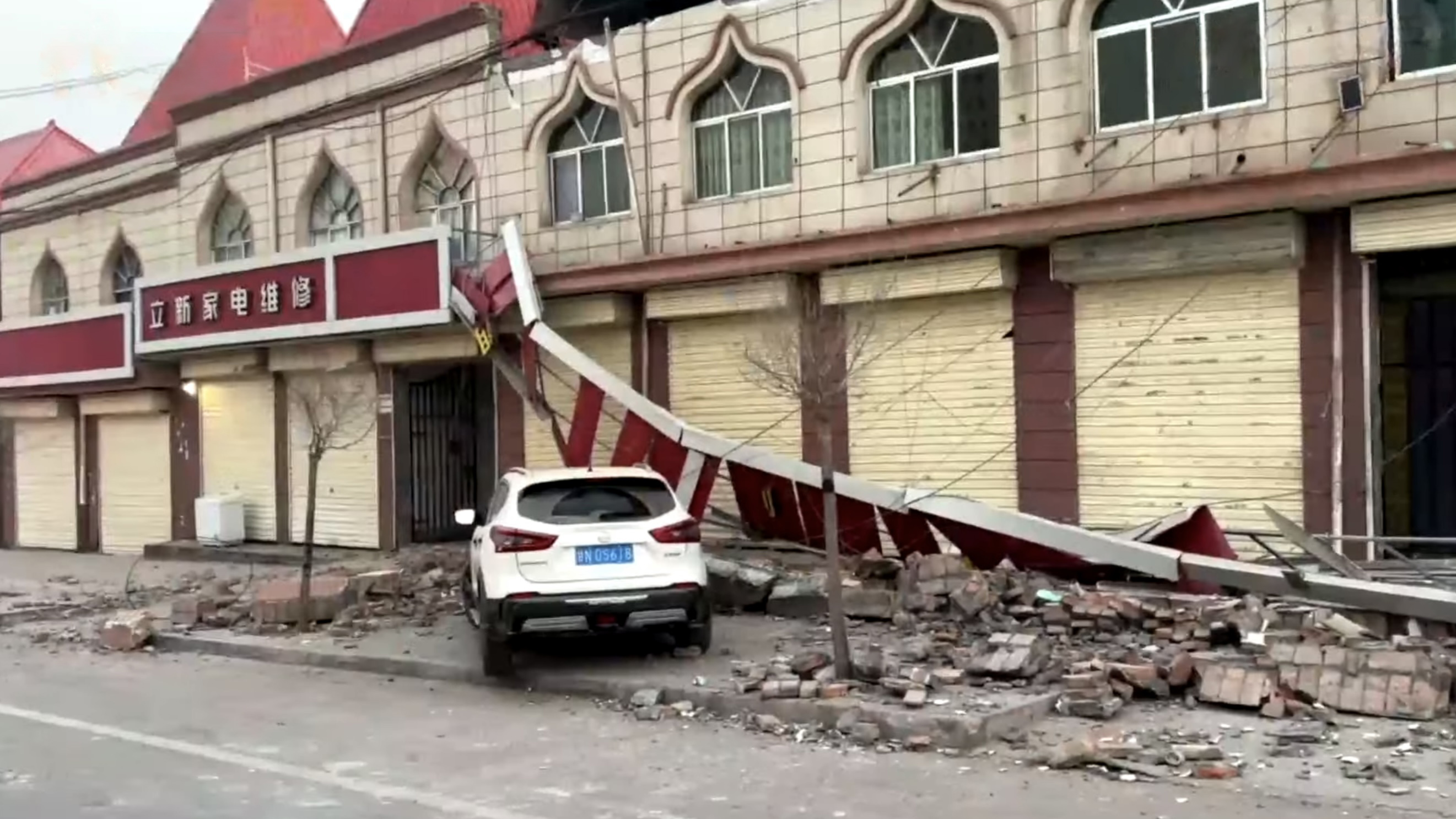
2023 Jishishan earthquake

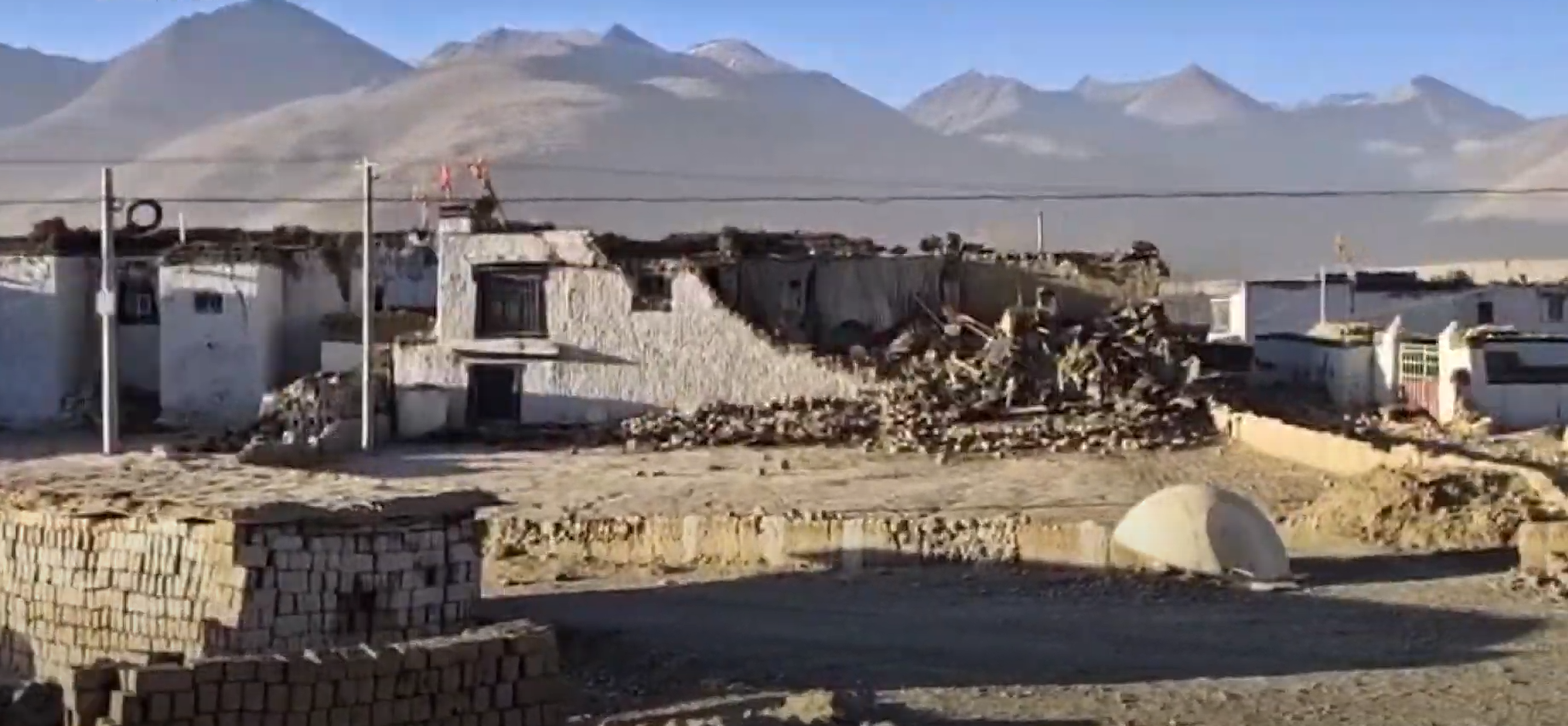
2025 Tibet earthquake

== See also ==
- List of disasters in China by death toll
- Geology of China
- List of earthquakes in Sichuan
- List of earthquakes in Taiwan
- List of earthquakes in Yunnan
