= 2021 Luxian earthquake =

Earthquake in China

- Location within Sichuan Location within China
- UTC time: 2021-09-15 20:33:31
- ISC event: 621079013
- USGS-ANSS: ComCat
- Local date: 16 September 2021
- Local time: 04:33 (CST)
- Magnitude: 5.4 M_{w} 6.0 M_{s}
- Depth: 7.5 km (4.7 mi)
- Epicenter: 29.194°N 105.374°E
- Type: Reverse fault
- Areas affected: Lu County, Sichuan, China
- Total damage: $250 million USD
- Max. intensity: CSIS VIII
- Casualties: 3 dead, 146 injured

The 2021 Luxian earthquake was a damaging seismic event occurring in the early hours of September 16 at 04:33 China Standard Time. The surface-wave magnitude (M_{s}) 6.0 or moment magnitude (M_{w}) 5.4 earthquake struck at a shallow depth of 7.5 km and severe shaking in an area of 4,000 square kilometers was assigned a maximum intensity of VIII on the China seismic intensity scale. Three people were killed and 146 injured when the earthquake struck Lu County, Luzhou, Sichuan Province. At least 36,800 buildings were affected, 7,800 of them seriously damaged or completely destroyed, causing about a quarter of a billion dollars' worth of damage.

== Tectonic setting ==
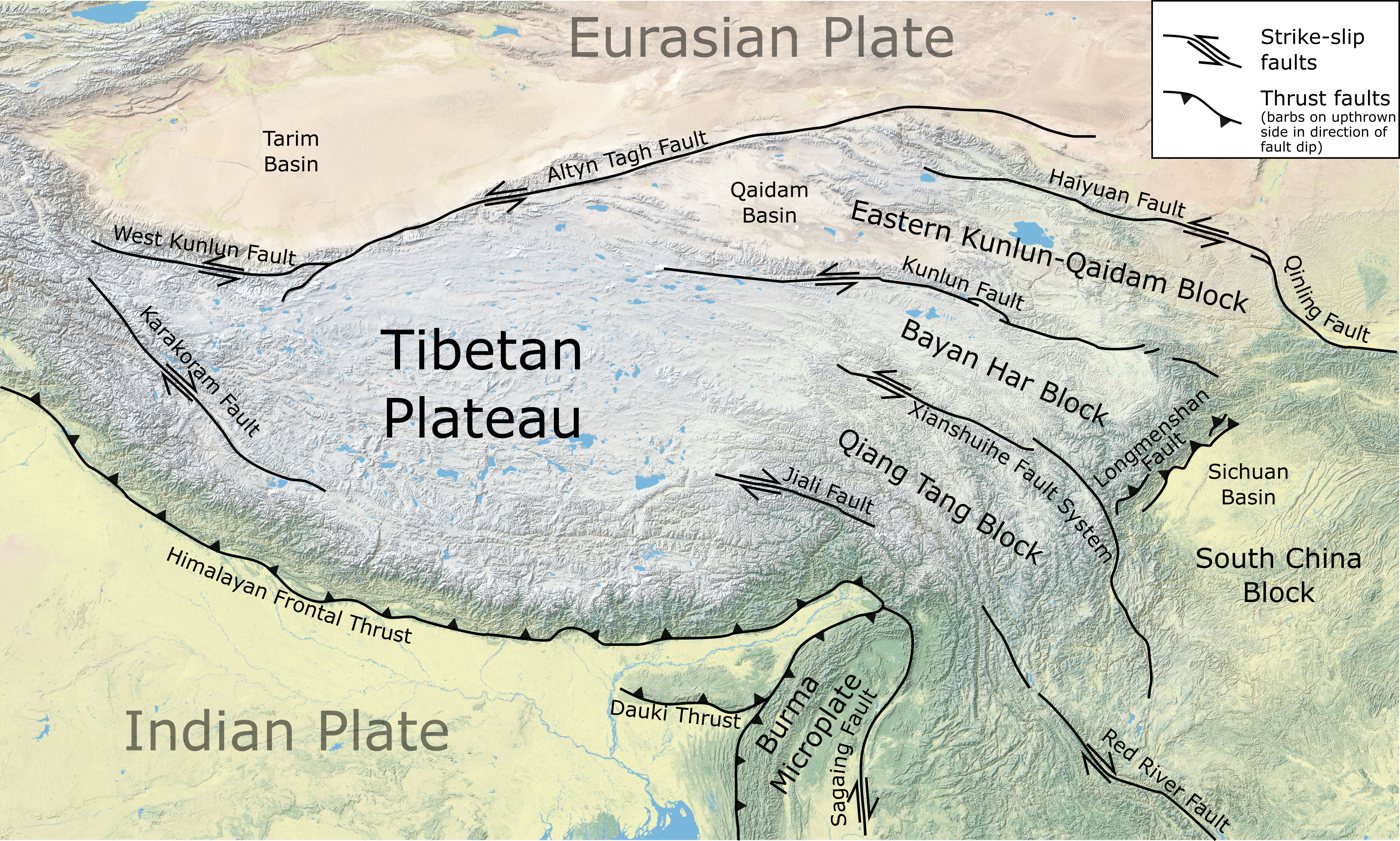
A map of the India-Asia deformation zone with active faults in the region.

The active plate tectonics of the Sichuan Basin is dominated by the north–south continental collision of the Indian plate and Eurasian plate. As the Indian plate collides along a convergent plate boundary known as the Main Himalayan Thrust, it being of continental crust does not subduct, rather it plows into the Eurasian plate. This process severely deforms the Eurasian plate, uplifting the crust, forming the Tibetan Plateau. The force of the Indian plate converging pushes the Tibetan Plateau east, towards the Sichuan Basin, forming another zone of collision. This collision and resulting crustal deformation of the Eurasian plate is accommodated by the Xianshuihe fault system, Kunlun Fault, Altyn Tagh fault, and Longmenshan Fault. The presence of active faults in Sichuan makes the region vulnerable to damaging earthquakes. The deadly 2008 Sichuan earthquake occurred due to a thrust fault rupture on the Longmenshan Fault.

== Earthquake ==
The China Earthquake Networks Center placed the epicenter of the quake in Lu County, Sichuan and recorded its magnitude at M_{s} 6.0. Meanwhile, the China Earthquake Administration (CEA) placed the M_{w} magnitude at 5.3. The United States Geological Survey (USGS) recorded the event at M_{w} 5.4 or mb5.9. A maximum seismic intensity of VIII was assigned Sichuan Earthquake Administration and CEA. It was felt with weaker intensities by residents as far as Chengdu.

The focal mechanism solution by both the USGS and CEA indicated shallow reverse faulting at a depth of 7.5 or 6 km. A fault plane with a northwest–southeast striking structure due to northeast–southwest compression within the Eurasian plate. An official at the Sichuan Seismological Station said the earthquake did not occur on the same fault as the 2008 event, adding that it was on the Huayingshan Fault Zone. The Huayingshan Fault Zone is much longer than the Longmenshan Fault, at 600 km in length, and is one of the largest faults in the Sichuan Basin. The fault has a northeast strike and dip at angles of 30° to 70°. The fault has a slip sense of sinistral strike-slip and thrust.

== Impact ==
The earthquake caused the collapse of over 1,400 houses, severely damaged 6,400 houses, and slightly damaged 29,000 houses. The majority of the homes damaged were old and of poor construction quality. Newer buildings withstood the tremor better as they were improved after the 2008 Sichuan earthquake, which killed nearly 90,000 and left over 18,000 missing. The quake damaged a warehouse in Lu County which led to the loss of 150 tons of liquor.

Power outages were caused by the earthquake which disrupted power supplies and affected at least 20,000 homes. Telecommunication services ceased due to damage at 106 facilities and broken cables. Three high-speed rail services were temporarily suspended at Lu County as a result. The collapse of many homes in Lu County severely damaged a number of gas pipelines, affecting 678 families. Damage was reported at 42 reserviors, 10 embankments, 32 irrigation projects, and nine water supply centers.

A small landslide occurred at Yuchan Mountain, partially burying the road along its slopes. Officials at the Chengdu University of Technology said there is a low risk of landslides occurring in the affected areas.

=== Casualties ===
The collapse of prefabricated buildings resulted in the deaths of two individuals. The first victim was an elderly man in his 70s who died after bricks fell onto him in his home. Another woman died when the prefabricated panels of her home fell on her. A third death was confirmed the following day as a woman in her 70s. Another 146 people were treated for injuries, at least three of them were in critical condition. Over 70,000 people were evacuated for medical treatment or temporary housing.

== Response ==
Within five seconds of detection by seismic instruments, the earthquake early warning system issued a warning via radio, television, and other means of broadcast. Apps like Sina Weibo and Alipay also provided advanced warning to users several seconds before shaking could be felt.

More than 7,400 armed police and firefighters, 304 vehicles, and 95 rescue equipment such as patrol boats, and excavators were dispatched by Lu County to carry out rescue and relief works. The Luxian No.2 Middle School and Jiuquhe Park were used to temporarily facilitate the relocation of affected residents. Some 2,500 tents, 20,700 folding beds, 20,600 blankets and over 10,000 household items were provided to survivors. The Sichuan government 50 million yuan in allocation to disaster relief efforts, temporary shelter, patient transportation and resettlement and medical treatment.

== See also ==
- List of earthquakes in 2021
- List of earthquakes in China
- List of earthquakes in Sichuan
