= 1604 Quanzhou earthquake =

Magnitude 8 earthquake off Fujian, China

- Location within Fujian Location within China
- Local date: December 29, 1604
- Magnitude: M_{w} 8.1
- Depth: 5–10 km (3.1–6.2 mi)
- Epicenter: 23.54°N 117.24°E
- Areas affected: Ming dynasty
- Max. intensity: MMI IX (Violent)
- Tsunami: Unlikely
- Casualties: "Several"

The 1604 Quanzhou earthquake was an extremely large seismic event that occurred in the Taiwan Strait, off the coast of Fujian Province, near Quanzhou during the Ming dynasty. According to modern-day calculations, the earthquake had a moment magnitude of 8.1 M_{w}. It is unknown how many casualties resulted from the quake, but major damage was reported.

== Tectonic setting ==
The coast of Fujian Province, along the Taiwan Strait, is a tectonically stable part of the Eurasian Plate, therefore experience relatively low seismic activity. The area forms part of the passive margin between the continental crust of the South China Craton and the oceanic crust of the South China Sea. Within the stable South China Craton, there are three zones of higher earthquake activity, one of which is the Southeast China Coast seismic zone running through Guangdong and Fujian. This zone follows the South China Maritime Fold Belt, which formed during a subduction event during the Late Jurassic to Early Cretaceous epochs. The area is currently in a compressive stress regime with the maximum horizontal stress orientated northwest-southeast. This results from a combination of the continuing collision between the Indian and Eurasian Plates and the subduction of the Philippine Sea Plate.

== Earthquake ==
The earthquake was associated with the Bingai Fault System of the Southeast China Coast seismic zone. The Binhai Fault System, also known as the Littoral Fault System runs offshore in a north-northeast orientation for a total length of 500 km. Movement along the fault occurs in a right-lateral strike-slip fashion, although there is a small thrust component in it. The fault was the source of large earthquakes in 1185, 1574, 1600, 1906, and most recently the 1918 Shantou earthquake.

By modelling the earthquake and comparing the simulated seismic intensities against historical descriptions of the event, the moment magnitude of the quake is estimated at 8.1 M_{w}. The model estimates a maximum coseismic slip of 16–20 meters along with the Bingai Fault System. The rupture zone along the fault is estimated to be 250 km by 20 km.

== Impact ==
Two foreshocks occurred on December 22 and 28 in Anhai and Hui'an County, respectively. The main shock on 29 December in the evening caused serious damage in the Minnan region. At least 22 counties across Fujian, Jiangxi, and Zhejiang suffered extensive destruction. The quake was felt 1,000 km away in Anhui, Jiangsu, Shanghai, Hubei, Hunan, Guangdong, and Guangxi. The maximum intensity near the coast has been evaluated to be IX (Destructive) on the China seismic intensity scale. Intensity VII (Very strong) was felt over an area of 20,669 km^{2}.

In Quanzhou, land slumping occurred, carrying many homes and shops away. Many roads, defensive wall, bridges and temples were destroyed. Liquefaction caused water and sand to erupt from the ground. Two rafters at the east pagoda of the Kaiyuan Temple, and eight at the southeast were destroyed. Severe damage also occurred on the Luoyang Bridge. Sulfur gases, sand and water was emitted from Mount Qingyuan.

At Putian, sections of the defensive walls toppled. Tall buildings nearly collapsed while shorter homes were heavily damaged. In Yangwei, Xiakedi and Ligang, extensive fissuring occurred, with water and sand erupting. The battlements on the city walls of Nan'an fell. Severe damage was also reported in Haicheng, Fuzhou, Pinghe, Changtai, Shangyu, and Wenzhou.

== See also ==
- List of earthquakes in China
