= 2026 Liuzhou earthquakes =

Earthquakes in Liuzhou, China

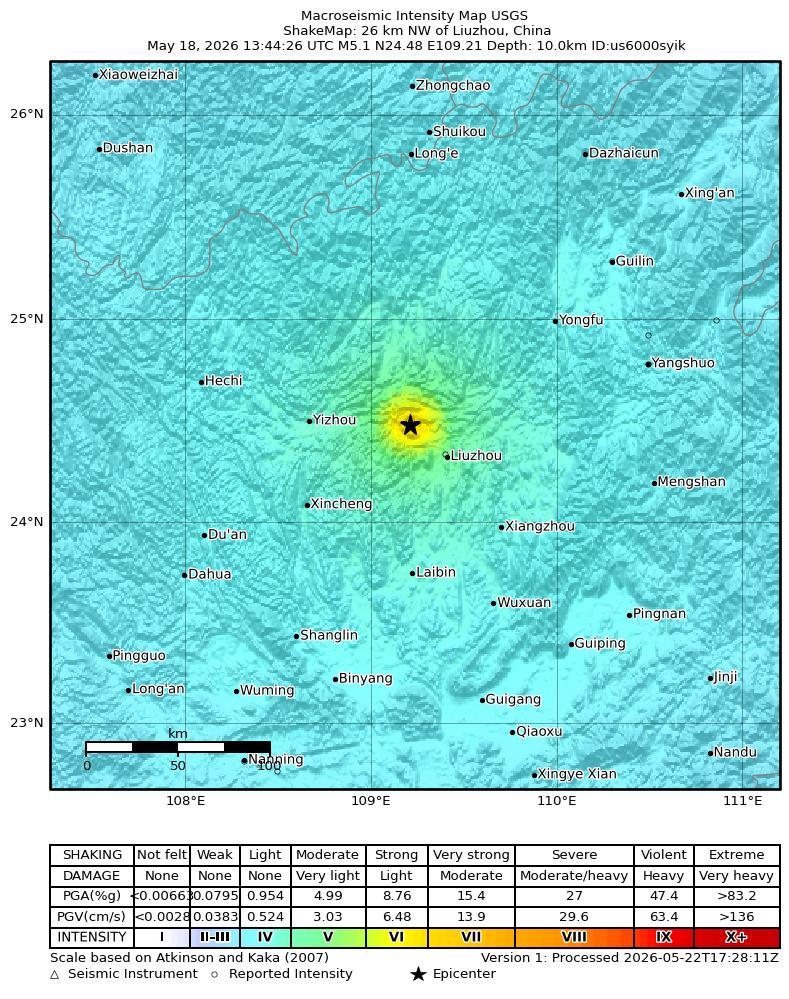
- USGS ShakeMap of the second mainshock
- UTC time: 2026-05-17 16:21:06; 2026-05-18 13:44:26
- ISC event: 645730761; 645731958
- USGS-ANSS: ComCat; ComCat
- Local date: May 18, 2026; 5 months ago
- Local time: 00:21:06 CST; 21:44:26 CST
- Magnitude: M_{w} 5.0–5.2; M_{w} 5.1–5.2
- Depth: 10.0 km (6.2 mi)
- Epicenter: 24.38°N 109.26°E; 24.37°N 109.26°E
- Fault: Baipeng fault
- Type: Reverse
- Areas affected: Liuzhou, Guangxi, China
- Total damage: 987 homes and buildings severely damaged or destroyed
- Max. intensity: CSIS VII (MMI VII)
- Aftershocks: 59+
- Casualties: 2 deaths, 6 injuries

On 18 May 2026, two doublet earthquakes measuring M_{ww} 5.0 and 5.1 (both measuring 5.2 according to the China Earthquake Administration) struck Liuzhou, Guangxi, China. Two people were killed, six others were injured and nearly 1,000 structures were badly damaged or destroyed by both events.

== Earthquakes ==
Both earthquakes were located in Liujiang District of Liuzhou, were centered only 2 km (1.2 mi) apart, and had a depth of 10 km (6.2 mi), according to the United States Geological Survey (USGS). The China Earthquake Administration (CEA) reported that both earthquakes measured M_{w} 5.2 and were less than 8 km (5.0 mi) deep. The quakes were the largest to strike the area in 331 years. The mainshock had a maximum intensity of VII in the China seismic intensity scale (CSIS) covering an area of 2 km^{2}, while an area of 356 km^{2} was covered by intensity VI. The earthquake's isoseismal pattern was oriented in a north-northeast direction, with an estimated major axis of about 27 km (17 mi) and a minor axis of about 16 km (9.9 mi). According to USGS, the second mainshock had a maximum Modified Mercalli intensity (MMI) of VII (Very strong), which was felt by an estimated 9,000 people; MMI VI-VII (Strong-Very strong) was estimated in Liujiang District while MMI V (Moderate) was felt in Liuzhou's city centre. Tremors were also felt in Guilin, Nanning, Guigang, Wuzhou and as far away as Hong Kong and parts of northern Vietnam, including the capital Hanoi. The USGS issued an orange alert for economic losses in the second mainshock, but issued a green alert for estimated fatalities.

Following the first of the two mainshocks, the China Earthquake Networks Center (CENC) conducted an analysis of the event and preliminarily determined that it resulted from reverse faulting. Researchers stated that the earthquakes occurred near the Hechi–Yizhou–Liucheng fault system, a thrust-dominated fault zone characterized by historically weak and infrequent seismic activity, where previous studies estimated a maximum potential earthquake magnitude of approximately 5.5. China Daily, however, citing the Guangxi Earthquake Agency, reported that the quake occurred as a result of movement of the Baipeng fault, about 3 km (1.9 mi) from the epicenter. According to the CENC, only one earthquake of magnitude 5.0 or greater had occurred within 100 km (62 mi) of the epicenter since 1900. Experts later suggested that the sequence was more consistent with a "doublet earthquake swarm with foreshocks" rather than a typical earthquake swarm, as the two mainshocks occurred within the same day.

The mainshocks were preceded by several foreshocks on 17 May, making residents more vigilant and leaving them out of danger. As of 21 May, a total of 59 aftershocks had been recorded near Liuzhou.

== Impact ==
A Level III emergency response was activated. A married couple were killed by a collapsing house and at least five people were injured by the first mainshock. A 91-year old man was initially reported missing but was later rescued from the rubble of a collapsed building. At least 16 homes were destroyed, 970 others were severely damaged, sinkholes appeared and a landslide blocked a road in Liuzhou. Over 7,000 people were displaced by the first mainshock.

The second earthquake at 21:44 CST slightly injured one person, caused one house to collapse, damaged several others and triggered rockfalls.

== See also ==
- List of earthquakes in 2026
- List of earthquakes in China
- 1936 Lingshan earthquake – 1936 earthquake in southern China
- 1969 Yangjiang earthquake – Earthquake in Guangdong, China
- 2005 Ruichang earthquake – Earthquake in China
