= 2020 Kashgar earthquake =

Earthquake affecting Xinjiang, China

- Location within Southern Xinjiang
- UTC time: 2020-01-19 13:27:56
- ISC event: 617194918
- USGS-ANSS: ComCat
- Local date: January 19, 2020
- Local time: 21:27:56
- Magnitude: 6.0 M_{w} 6.4 M_{s}
- Depth: 5.6 km (3.5 mi)
- Epicenter: 39.835°N 77.108°E
- Type: Reverse
- Areas affected: Xinjiang, China
- Total damage: CN¥ 1.62 billion (US$236 million)
- Max. intensity: MMI VIII (Severe) CSIS VIII
- Casualties: 1 dead, 2 injured

The 2020 Kashgar earthquake, also known as the Jiashi earthquake occurred on 19 January 2020 at 21:27:56 China Standard Time in Xinjiang Province, China. According to the United States Geological Survey, the earthquake had a moment magnitude of 6.0 and a surface-wave magnitude of 6.4 according to the China Earthquake Network Center. It struck at a shallow depth of 5.6 km according to the USGS while the CENC has the figure at 16 km. Local emergency management agencies said the earthquake damaged more than 1,000 homes and businesses in the nearby populated towns and villages. One person is known to have died while two other children were injured.

== Tectonic setting ==
Northern Xinjiang lies at the northernmost extreme zone of continental deformation as a result of the ongoing collision between India and Eurasia. The epicenter region of the 2020 Kashgar earthquake lies along the Kalpin (Kepingtage or Kalpingtag) fold and thrust belt, which has folded and uplifted strata to form the Chinese Tian Shan mountains. This fold and thrust belt is located at the southern foot of the Chinese Tien Shan range and is 300 km long while being 75 km wide. It consists of a series of anticlines, three low-angle thrust faults and an underlying décollement. These faults and the décollement aid in the subduction of the Tarim Basin.

The fold and thrust belt is seismically active and is the source of many moderately large to major events with focal depths of between 15 km to 32 km. Historically, the region has hosted many large magnitude 6.0+ earthquakes, but their destructive capabilities were limited due to the sparse population density. The largest event ever recorded was the 1902 Turkestan earthquake, with an estimated moment magnitude of 7.7. It had an epicenter very close to that of the 2020 event and is thought to have ruptured the decollément. This earthquake killed anywhere between 5,000 and 20,000 people in nearby Kashgar. Another earthquake in 1996 resulted in the death of at least 24 individuals and damaged more than 15,300 homes. The magnitude 6.3 earthquake in 2003 has an epicenter just south of where the 2020 earthquake was. It killed some 216 people and left 4,000 injured. It also collapsed more than 71,000 and damaged at least 41,000 others.

The slip rate along the shallow frontal part of the Kalping fold and thrust belt has been measured at 1 to 2 mm/yr or just one-fourth the rate of subduction of the Tarim basin. This differs from most zones of convergence where the outermost thrust results in the greatest deformation and accommodates the most slip. Because much of the geological deformation and activity is not at the outer thrusts, the faults are moving at much slower rates. While the faults of the Kalping fold and thrust belt are active and seismogenic, much of the décollement is not due to the lack of friction. It instead displays aseismic creep at depth.

== Earthquake ==
According to the United States Geological Survey, the earthquake ruptured with a shallow focal depth of 5.6 km at the foothills of the Tien Shan mountains. The epicenter of the earthquake is located in close proximity to the G3012 Turpan–Hotan Expressway, or 104 km east northeast of the city of Kashgar.

The China Earthquake Network Center stated that the earthquake registered 6.4 M_{s} on the Chinese surface-wave magnitude scale. A hypocenter depth of 16 km was estimated.

The mainshock was followed by a number of aftershocks, the largest measuring M_{w} 5.0 or M_{s} 5.2. According to the China Earthquake Administration, ten aftershocks were measured with magnitudes greater than 3.0, in the range of 4.3 to 5.0. A strong M_{w} 5.3 foreshock occurred on January 17 with an epicenter south southeast of the mainshock epicenter.

=== Characteristics ===
Focal mechanism solutions provided by the USGS show that the earthquake occurred as the result of shallow reverse faulting, with a small strike-slip component. Source models using InSAR data show the earthquake involved slippage on the flat portion of a listric fault without rupturing to the surface. Rupture geometry reveals a 34 km by 12 km zone of slip on the fault at a depth of between 5–7 km. The maximum slip caused by the earthquake is estimated to be 0.29 meters at a depth of 6.3 km. The epicenter of this earthquake is said to have been at the southern margin of the Kalpin fold and thrust belt, where the Tian Shan meets the Tarim Basin. Calculating the Coulomb stress transfer caused by the earthquake demonstrates the increased risk of seismic hazard in the region. With the lack of aftershocks and the pattern of historic seismicity in the region, another large earthquake may occur in the future.

A more recent analysis of the event reveals that this occurred beneath the shallow décollement, consistent with earlier earthquakes in 1997, 1998, and 2003. By relocating the hypocenter, a different focal depth was found, 15–18 km beneath the fold and thrust belt. It is thought to involve a rupture on a much deeper and older fault structure.

== Impact ==
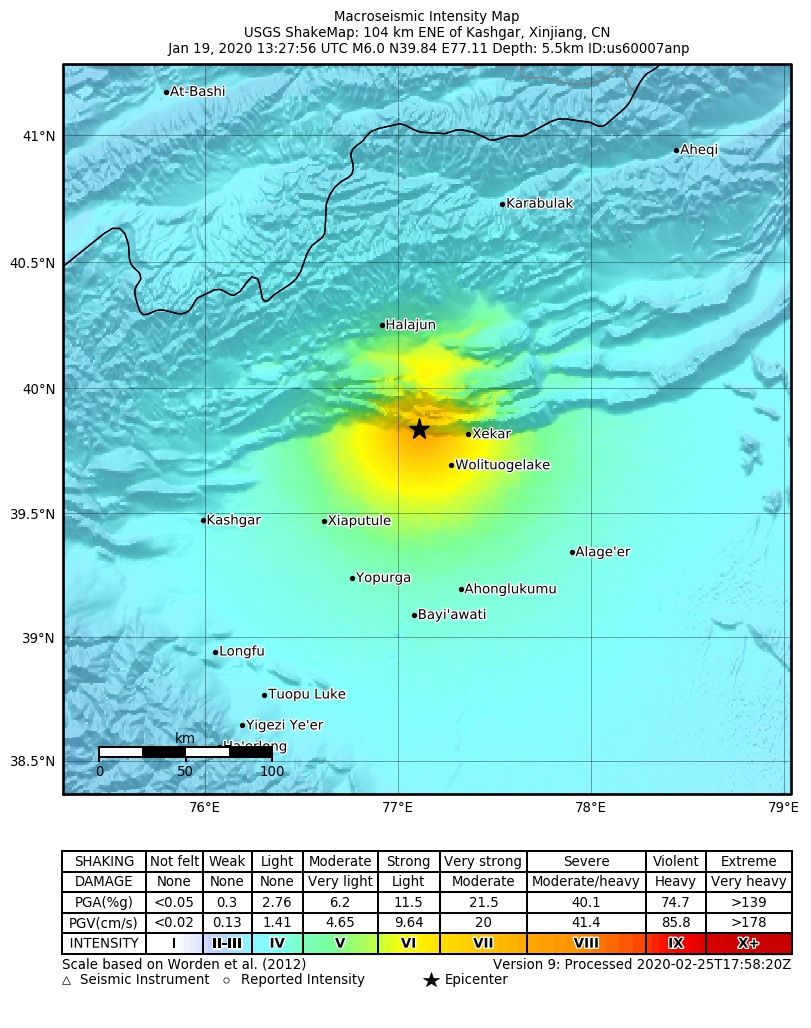
A USGS ShakeMap of the Mw6.0 earthquake in Xinjiang.

The earthquake had a maximum intensity of VIII on the Mercalli intensity scale and China seismic intensity scale. According to a local villager in Guleruk Township, Jiashi County who survived the earthquake, it was described as violent and "like thunder", adding that the shaking lasted for 20 to 30 seconds.

One person was seriously injured and was reported deceased later. Local media then reported that "many" people also sustained light injuries due to the earthquake. This claim was later specified to just two individuals suffering minor injuries and one person dying. The Xinjiang Railway Department immediately suspended 9 passenger trains from operating in the affected area. Damage from the earthquake amounted to CN¥ 1.62 billion (US$236 million).

Local emergency workers inspected some 206 homes and found eight total collapses, 122 with collapsed walls and 68 with partially cracked or fallen walls. Four self-constructed shops totally collapsed in the earthquake and 52 other homes had moderate damage. Another 955 homes sustained light damage. A 1.1 km and 5.6 km-long wall also collapsed due to the quake. Roads including a major highway and transmission lines were severely compromised by the temblor as well.

== See also ==
- List of earthquakes in 2020
- List of earthquakes in China
