= 1739 Yinchuan–Pingluo earthquake =

Earthquake near Shizuishan, China

- Location within China
- UTC time: 18:00
- Local date: January 3, 1739
- Magnitude: 7.1–7.6 M_{w}
- Epicenter: 38.9°N 106.5°E
- Type: Normal; Intraplate
- Areas affected: Qing Empire (now China)
- Max. intensity: MMI XI (Extreme); CSIS XII
- Foreshocks: None
- Aftershocks: Yes
- Casualties: 50,000 dead

The 1739 Yinchuan–Pingluo earthquake (simplified Chinese: 银川-平罗地震; traditional Chinese: 銀川-平羅地震; pinyin: Yínchuān-píng luó dìzhèn) rocked the northern Ningxia Hui Autonomous Region on January 3 with an epicenter in the prefecture-level city Shizuishan. The estimated magnitude 7.1–7.6 earthquake had a maximum intensity of XI on the Mercalli intensity scale, and killed about 50,000 residents and officials. It was widely felt; perceived in Shanxi, Shaanxi and Hebei provinces. Aftershocks persisted for more than two years with the largest being a 5.5 on February 13 that same year.

== Tectonic setting ==
Although northern China is nowhere near the boundaries of tectonic plates, the region is straddled with faults and there are ongoing deformation. Ningxia lies in a complex transition zone of compression at the northeastern Tibetan Plateau to extension, horst and graben features in the Ordos Plateau. To the south, the massive strike-slip Haiyuan Fault comes in and becomes a group of reverse faults.

The Yinchuan graben is a 50 km (31 mi) × 160 km (99 mi) block of crust at the northern tip of Ningxia, bounded by several north–south striking normal faults. Two of these faults are the Helanshan Piedmont Fault Zone (East Helanshan Fault) to the western boundary of the graben, and the Huang He (Yellow River) Fault to the east. Their slip rate is 2–3 mm (0.079–0.118 in) per year. The East Helanshan Fault is the root fault of two more blind faults; the Luhuatai and Yinchuan-Pingluo faults form within the block. Seismic imaging shows that the East Helanshan Fault converge with the Huanghe Fault at 30 km (19 mi) depth. The East Helanshan and Yinchuan–Pingluo intersects to become one fault at a depth of 30 km (19 mi). The Helanshan Mountains separated the western side of the graben from the Alxa Desert while the Ordos Plateau is to the east. The extension rate of the Yinchuan graben is believed to be 2.9 ± 1 mm (0.114 ± 0.039 in) per year. The graben has accumulated up to 7 km (4.3 mi) of sediments from the late Eocene.

At its southern tip, the Sanguankou and Niushoushan faults, together with other northwest–southeast trending faults, form the south boundary of the block. At the north end of the block, the Zhengyiguan Fault, a dextral strike-slip fault runs through the Helanshan Mountains.

Two inferred earthquakes of M_{w} 6.5 occurred in the area in 1143 and 1477, and an M_{w} 6.0 in 1921 would be the most recent major activity in the graben. The average recurrence interval for large earthquakes like that of 1739 in the region is about 1,500–2,000 years.

== Earthquake ==
The estimated magnitude was in the range of M_{w} 7.1–7.6. Early studies gave the event a magnitude of 8.0 based on historical documentation of shaking, making it among the largest normal faulting intraplate earthquakes. Continental intraplate normal earthquake with magnitudes larger than M_{w} 7.0 are uncommon. The source fault was determined to be the East Helanshan Fault which ruptured for 88 km (55 mi). An estimated maximum slip has been suggested at 10–13 km (6.2–8.1 mi). Fault scarps known as the Suyukou scarps were discovered along the trace of the East Helanshan Fault preserved in alluvial fans for 16.5 km (10.3 mi). Some of these were as high as 11 m (36 ft), but they were not from one single event; multiple earlier earthquakes were identified from the scarp. The maximum height of the scarp created by the earthquake was 5.1 m (17 ft), with an average of 3.0 m (9.8 ft). Another set of scarps known as the Hongguozigou scarps 65 km (40 mi) away from the Suyukou scarp was traced for 3.5 km (2.2 mi). It was a near vertical wall 2.7 m (8 ft 10 in) high, with a dextral offset of 3 m (9.8 ft).

However, another research placed the source fault as the Huanghe Fault. This fault is mostly buried under sediments, and is on opposite sides of the graben, parallel to the East Helanshan Fault. It extends over 120 km (75 mi), with much of its fault scarps eroded away, buried under several meters of sediment.

Strong shaking from the earthquake was inferred to be along the trace of the Yinchuan–Pingluo and Huanghe faults, where buildings in the area were almost totally destroyed, while along the East Helanshan and Luhuatai faults, many buildings were still standing with slight damage. The Shuang Towers, 15 stories high, and build near the Suyukou scarps did not collapse during the quake of 1739, but towers in Yinchuan City, closer to the Huanghe Fault were totally destroyed. These damage patterns has been inferred that the strongest shaking intensities were on the eastern side if the graben, where the Huanghe and Yinchuan–Pingluo faults are close to the surface. It was previously thought that The Great Wall which runs through Ningxia was offset by a surface rupture was instead built on a pre-existing fault scarp of the Helanshan Piedmont Fault Zone, not formed by the earthquake of 1739. The fault scarp was dated at 2370 and 2060 BP; much older than the wall itself which was built in the early 16th century.

== Effects ==
The strongest shaking from the earthquake were in Yinchuan and Pingluo, where maximum intensity of XII was determined on the Chinese seismic intensity scale, and XI on the Mercalli intensity scale. In this region of intensity, the earthquake collapsed most houses, temples, offices, and a city wall 10 m (33 ft) tall and 6 m (20 ft) wide. Ground fissures up to a meter wide, and 100 m (330 ft) long, and great subsidence were accounted in historical records. In Yinchuan, there were over 15,300 people killed. The city was completely levelled, and blazing fires burned all the way through the night as many canals were destroyed, shutting off the flow of water. The ground opened for more than 100 m (330 ft), where sand and black water erupted.

== See also ==
- List of earthquakes in China
- List of historical earthquakes
