= 1038 Dingxiang earthquake =

Earthquake in China

- Location within China
- Local date: January 9, 1038
- Magnitude: M_{s} 7.25
- Epicenter: 38.4°N 112.92°E
- Areas affected: China
- Max. intensity: CSIS X
- Casualties: 32,300 dead

The 1038 Dingxiang earthquake devastated present-day Shanxi Province, northern China on 9 January. At least 32,300 people died across the province when the M_{s} 7.25 earthquake struck Dingxiang and Xinxian counties. In Xinzhou, about 19,742 people died and 5,655 were injured. More than 50,000 livestock also perished. About 759 were killed in Guoxian County and in present-day Taiyuan, 1,890 people died.

== Geology ==
The Xizhoushan Fault Zone, a strike-slip fault system within the Shanxi Rift System, may have been responsible for the earthquake. Field studies indicate at least three earthquakes occurred along the fault during the Holocene with the most recent event possibly being the 1038 earthquake. This fault delineates the Xizhoushan Mountains and Xinding basin within the rift system. Estimates of the right-lateral slip rate range from 5.86–5.22 mm (0.231–0.206 in) per year to as low as 2 mm (0.079 in) per year during the Holocene. At least 60 km (37 mi) of surface rupture along the fault was associated with the earthquake. Triggering of earthquakes in the rift system may have been due to the combined effects of coulomb stress transfer and long-term tectonic stress. In the case of the 1038 event, it was promoted by stress transfer from a previous M_{s} 7.5 earthquake in 512 AD. This may have in turn promoted the M_{s} 6.5 earthquake near Taiyuan in 1102.

== See also ==
- List of earthquakes in China
- List of historical earthquakes
