= 2008 Panzhihua earthquake =

Earthquake in Sichuan, China

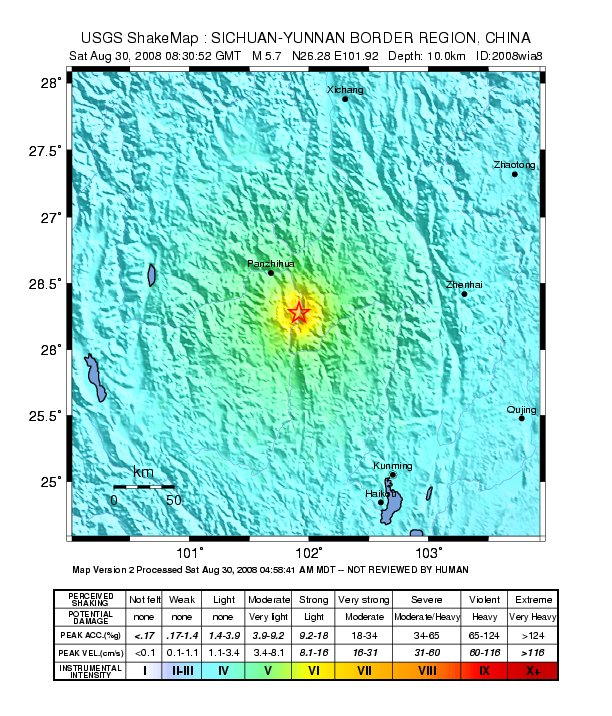
- UTC time: 2008-08-30 08:30:54
- ISC event: 13392944
- USGS-ANSS: ComCat
- Local date: August 30, 2008
- Local time: 16:30:54 CST
- Magnitude: 6.1 M_{s} (CEA); 6.0 M_{w} (USGS)
- Depth: 11.0 km (6.8 mi)
- Epicenter: 26.0°N 101.9°E (Renhe (Chinese: 仁和), Panzhihua, Sichuan)
- Areas affected: China
- Max. intensity: CSIS VIII
- Aftershocks: 439
- Casualties: 43 dead, 589 injured

The 2008 Panzhihua earthquake struck southern Sichuan province, China on August 30 at 16:30:50.5 China Standard Time with a surface-wave magnitude of 6.1, or 6.0 M_{w}. It is also cited as the Renhe-Huili earthquake, especially in SCEA reports and early CEA reports. It was not an aftershock of the Sichuan earthquake that occurred several months prior. With more than 400 aftershocks, it caused over 40 deaths, the collapse of 10,000 homes and damage to other infrastructure in the provinces of Sichuan and Yunnan. The maximum liedu was VIII (Heavily damaging).

== Earthquake ==
According to the China Earthquake Administration (CEA) and Sichuan Earthquake Administration (SCEA), the (M_{s}) 6.1 shock struck southern Sichuan province, China on August 30, 2008, at 16:30:50.5 China Standard Time (CST – 0730 UTC). The United States Geological Survey (USGS) reported it at (M_{w}) 6.0.

The earthquake's epicenter was located at 26.2°N 101.9°E, in the Renhe District of Panzhihua, Sichuan, which is 50 km southeast of the city center. The epicenter is 60 km from Huili County in Liangshan Yi Autonomous Prefecture, Sichuan, 30 km from Yongren County and 55 km from Yuanmou County in neighboring Yunnan province.

Whereas the Sichuan earthquake two and half months earlier in the same province continues to invoke aftershocks even after August 30, the Panzhihua earthquake was not one of them because it occurred on a different fault.

=== Impact ===
By September 5, authorities confirmed 43 deaths (37 in Sichuan, 6 in Yunnan) and 589 injuries. CEA also reported the collapse of 10,000 homes, and damage had occurred to 190,000 more. Considerable damage to highways, bridges, and reservoirs were reported.

=== Intensity ===
The seismic intensity map published by SCEA shows a maximum liedu of VIII on the China seismic intensity scale (CSIS), somewhat equivalent to VIII (Heavily damaging) on EMS-94 from which CSIS drew reference. The area affected by liedu VIII earthquakes covered a north–south oriented oval of 628 km^{2} centered around the epicenter, 39 km long and 19 km wide, including 28 km^{2} in Yunnan province. The total area of liedu VI (Slightly damaging) and above is 9,634 km^{2}, of which 6,265 km^{2} are in Sichuan.

=== Aftershocks ===
A M_{s} 5.6 aftershock (5.5 M_{w} according to USGS) struck the same location on August 31, 2008, at 16:31:09.6 CST (08:31 UTC), causing at least two additional deaths.

By midnight CST September 1, there had been 439 aftershocks including the M5.6 one and two more exceeding M4.0.

Incidentally, a M_{s} 3.0 earthquake very close to the main quake's epicenter preceded the main quake by 2 hours 15 minutes.

== Response ==
Although the quake-stricken area is relatively low in population, reported at 118/km^{2}, early casualties and property damage were significant. Within two hours, the CEA invoked its Level III emergency response protocol for disaster relief. 8,000 troops and para-militia were deployed to the disaster area.

== See also ==
- 2008 Sichuan earthquake
