= 1955 Yuzha earthquake =

September 1955 earthquake in Sichuan, China

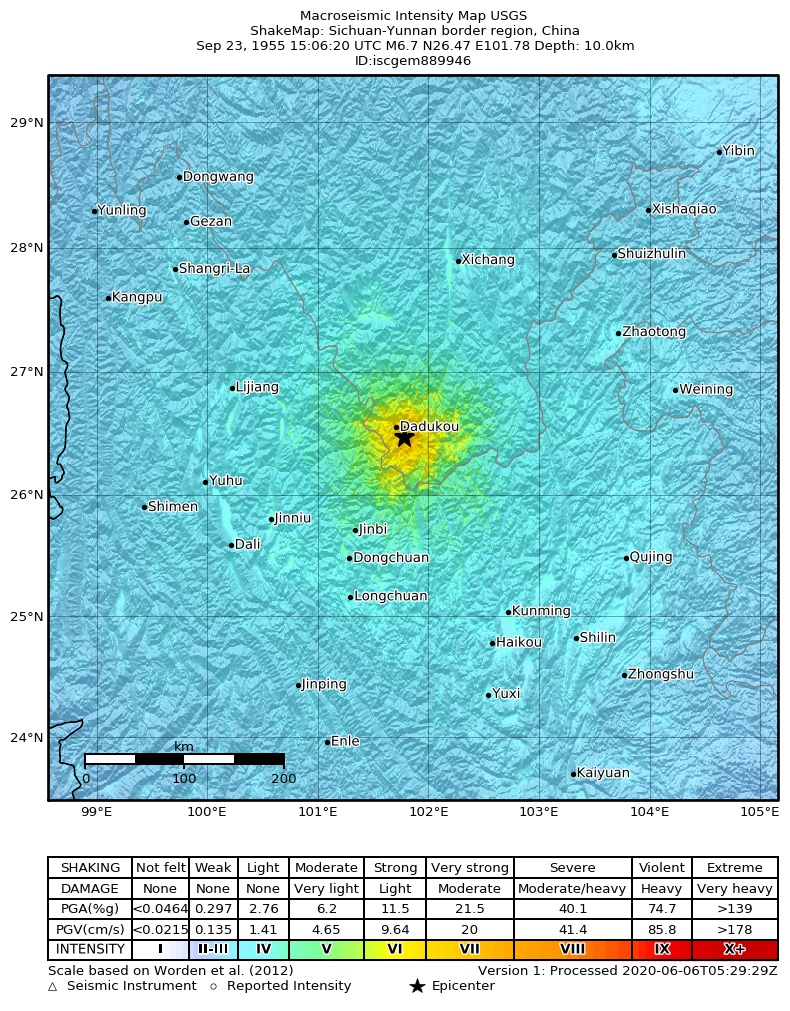
- USGS ShakeMap

- Location within Sichuan
- UTC time: 1955-09-23 15:06:20
- ISC event: 889946
- USGS-ANSS: ComCat
- Local date: September 23, 1955
- Local time: 23:06:20
- Magnitude: M_{s} 6.8
- Depth: 10 km (6.2 mi)
- Epicenter: 26.60°N 101.80°E
- Areas affected: China
- Max. intensity: MMI IX (Violent)
- Casualties: 728 dead, 1547 injured

The 1955 Yuzha earthquake (1955年鱼鲊地震) occurred on September 23, 1955, at 15:06 UTC (23:06 local time). The epicenter was located in the area around Lazha (拉鲊), Dalongtan (大龙潭) Township, Renhe District, Panzhihua and Yuzha (鱼鲊) Township, Huili County. Lazha then belonged to Yongren County, Yunnan and now within Sichuan. Yuzha then belonged to Huili County, Sichuan as it still does. The earthquake had a magnitude of M_{s} 6.8.

728 people were reported dead and 1547 injured in the earthquake. More than 15000 rooms collapsed. Eight people died and seven houses collapsed in the Xigeda (昔格达) Village. Cracks ranging from 10 to 70 cm in width and 100 to 1,500 m in length occurred on hillsides and ridges. Landslides were observed along both banks of the Jinsha River. Many villages on both banks of the Jinsha River were destroyed. Rivers and springs dried up, and many new springs appeared. Changes of water level in wells and ditches were reported. Many villages on both banks of the Jinsha River were destroyed. Along the Jinsha River and its surrounding gullies, large quantities of rocks broke, fell, and dammed up the gullies. In the Jinsha River, waves surged 1 m high. The maximum intensity reached MM IX. The shaking could be felt as far as about 400 km away.

The Xigeda-Yuanmou fault (昔格达—元谋断裂带), about 270 km long, is the seismogenic structure of this earthquake. From the distribution of the isoseismals of this earthquake, it was suggested that there is a three-layered structure. There is a rupture layer, and there are two complete rock layers located in both sides of the rupture layer. The rupture layer is the place where the stress was concentrated and released and has the role of reflecting the seismic wave propagation.

== See also ==
- List of earthquakes in 1955
- List of earthquakes in China
