= Seismic site effects =

Environmental effects on seismic waves

Seismic site effects are related to the amplification of seismic waves in superficial geological layers. The surface ground motion may be strongly amplified if the geological conditions are unfavorable (e.g. sediments). Therefore, the study of local site effects is an important part of the assessment of strong ground motions, seismic hazard and engineering seismology in general. Damage due to an earthquake may thus be aggravated as in the case of the 1985 Mexico City earthquake. For alluvial basins, we may shake a bowl of jelly to model the phenomenon at a small scale.

This article defines site effects first, presents the 1985 Mexico City earthquake, describes the theoretical analysis of the phenomenon (through mechanical waves) and details several research results on seismic site effects in Caracas.

== Definition of the phenomenon ==
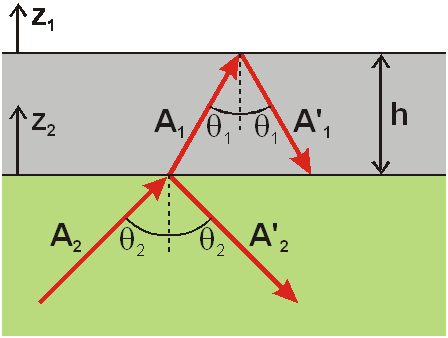
Fig.1 : Seismic site effects / wave amplification in a horizontal layer (SH-waves): various wavefields.

When propagating, the seismic waves are reflected and refracted at the interface between the various geological layers (Fig.1).

The example of Figure 1 depicts the seismic wave amplification in horizontal geological layers. We consider a homogeneous elastic half-space (in green) over which an elastic alluvial layer of constant thickness $h$ is located (in gray). A shear wave ($SH$) of amplitude $A_2$ reaches the interface between the half-space and the alluvial layer with an incidence $\theta_2$. It thus generates:

- a reflected wave in the half-space with amplitude $A_2^'$ and incidence $\theta_2$
- a refracted wave in the superficial layer with amplitude $A_1$ and incidence $\theta_1$

The refracted wave originates a reflected wave when reaching the free surface; its amplitude and incidence are denoted $A_1^'$ and $\theta_1$ respectively. This latter wave will be reflected and refracted several times at the base and the top of the surficial layer. If the layer is softer than the half-space, the surface motion amplitude can be larger than $A_2$ thus leading to the amplification of seismic waves or seismic site effects. When the geological interfaces are not horizontal, it also possible to study seismic site effects by considering the basin effects due to the complex geometry of the alluvial filling For small inclinations of the subsurface layers and/or low impedance contrasts, the assumption of horizontal layering (i.e. the 1D assumption) can still be used to predict site response.

In this article, we propose several examples of seismic site effects (observed or simulated during large earthquakes) as well as a theoretical analysis of the amplification phenomenon.

== Example: site effects in Mexico City (1985) ==
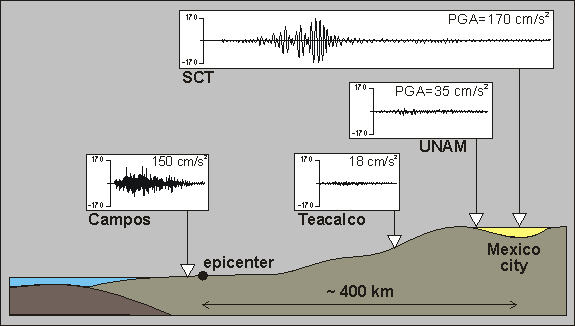
Fig.2 : Site effects in Mexico city: recordings from the 1985 earthquake

Seismic site effects have been first evidenced during the 1985 Mexico City earthquake. The earthquake epicenter was located along the Pacific Coast (several hundreds kilometers from Mexico-City), the seismic shaking was however extremely strong leading to very large damages.

Figure 2 displays the recordings performed at different distances from the epicenter during the earthquake sequence. The acceleration amplitude measured at different distances changes drastically:

- Campos station: this station is located very close to the epicenter and recorded a maximum acceleration of $150~cm/s^2$,
- Teacalco station: this station is located at more than 200 km from the epicenter and recorded a much lower acceleration (about $18~cm/s^2$). This amplitude decay is due to the wave attenuation during

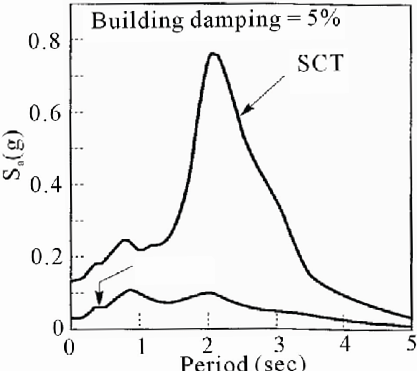
Figure 2a: The effect of the resonance: the natural frequency of the upper geological bed of the modern area of Mexico City (SCT) is 0.5Hz (period of 2 seconds), that's why the PGA reached its maximum amplitude at the same period. The lower curve is the UNAM spectral accelerations.

the propagation process: geometrical attenuation due to the expansion of the wavefront and material (or intrinsic) attenuation due to the energy dissipation within the medium (e.g. grains friction),

- UNAM station: this station is located at more than 300 km from the epicenter and recorded a maximum acceleration of $35~cm/s^2$, larger than that recorded at the Teacalco station,
- SCT station: this station is located in Mexico City at approximately 400 km from the epicenter and recorded a very strong maximum acceleration (about $170~cm/s^2$).

We may notice that the acceleration amplitude strongly decreases first and then increases when the seismic waves reach the alluvial deposit on which Mexico City has been founded.

Figure 2a: Shows the effect of resonance: The thickness of the upper geological bed of the modern area of Mexico City is 40 m. The velocity of the shear waves through that layer is 80 m/sec. It means that the natural frequency of that formation is 0.5 Hz (period of 2 seconds). When the shear waves of the same frequency arrived to that area, the resonance was responsible for that huge seismic site effect.

== Theoretical analysis of seismic site effects: horizontal layering ==
In case of horizontal soil layering (constant thickness, cf Fig.1), we may analyze seismic site effects theoretically. One considers a shear wave ($SH$) (i.e. polarized perpendicularly to the figure) reflected and refracted wave at the interface between both media and reflected at the free surface.

Considering Fig.1, we may analyze the propagation of the various waves in the sedimentary layer ($i=1$) and in the half-space ($i=2$). Assuming both media as linear elastic and writing the continuity conditions at the interface (displacement and traction) as well as the free surface conditions, we may determine the spectral ratio $\bar{T}(\omega)$ between the surface motion and the motion at the top of the half-space without any sedimentary layer:

$\bar{T}(\omega)=\frac{2A_1}{2A_2}=\frac{1}{\cos k_{z_1}h+i\bar{\chi}\sin k_{z_1}h}$

where $k_{z_1}=\frac{\omega \theta_i}{V_{S_i}}$ ; $\bar{\chi}=\sqrt{\frac{\mu_1\rho_1}{\mu_2\rho_2}}\frac{\cos\theta_1}{\cos\theta_2}$ and :

- $h$ is the layer thickness,
- $\theta_i$ is the wave incidence in layer $i$,
- $\rho_i$ is the mass density in layer $i$,
- $\mu_i$ is the shear modulus in layer $i$,
- $k_{z_1}$ is the vertical wave number in layer 1,
- $V_{S_i}=\sqrt{\frac{\mu_i}{\rho_i}}$ is the shear wave velocity.

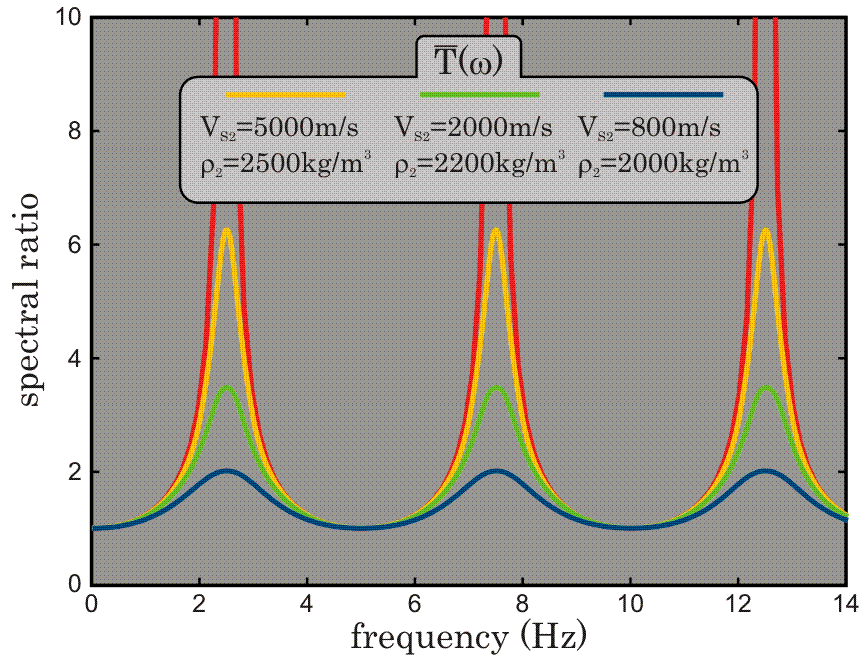
Fig. 3: Seismic site effects in a single sedimentary layer (SH waves): spectral ratio for various layer/bedrock velocity ratios

Fig.3 displays the variations of the spectral ratio $\bar{T}$ with respect to frequency for different mechanical features of the half-space (with $V_{S_1}=200~m/s$ for the sedimentary layer). We notice that the motion amplification may be very strong at certain frequencies. The amplification level depends on the velocity contrast $\bar{\chi}$ and takes the following maximum values:

- $|\bar{T}_{max}|=2$ for $V_{S_2}=800~m/s$ (blue curve),
- $|\bar{T}_{max}|\simeq 3.5$ for $V_{S_2}=2000~m/s$ (green curve),
- $|\bar{T}_{max}|\simeq 6$ for $V_{S_2}=5000~m/s$ (yellow curve).

The red curve corresponds to a large velocity contrast between the layer and the half-space ($\bar{\chi}\gg 1$); the amplification is thus very large. As displayed in Fig.3, the maximum amplification is reached at certain frequencies corresponding to the resonance of the sedimentary layer. The fundamental frequency of the layer (or 1st resonance frequency) may be easily calculated under the form: $f_0=\frac{V_{S_1}}{4h}$. The fundamental mode thus corresponds to a quarter wavelength resonance. The "quarter wavelength" approach can be used to estimate site amplifications due to the impedance contrast.

When the sedimentary layers are not horizontal (e.g. sedimentary basin), the analysis is more complex since surface waves generated by the lateral heterogeneities (e.g. basin edges) should be accounted for. In such cases, it is possible to perform empirical studies but also theoretical analyses for simple geometries or numerical simulations for more complex cases.

== Seismic site effects in sedimentary basins: the case of Caracas ==
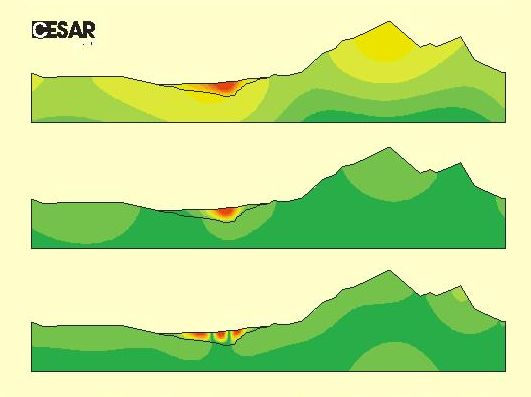
Fig.4: Seismic site effects in Caracas (BEM simulations in the frequency domain).

In sedimentary basins, site effects also lead to the generation of surface waves at the basin edges. This phenomenon may significantly strengthen the amplification of the seismic motion. The aggravation of the amplification level when compared to the case of horizontal layering may be up to a factor of 5 or 10. It depends on the velocity contrast between the layers and the geometry of the basin. Such phenomena are named basin effects and we may consider the analogy with the vibrations in a bowl of jelly.

The theoretical analysis of site effects in canyons or semi-circular sedimentary basins has been performed through semi-analytical methods in the early 80's. Recent numerical simulations allowed the analysis of site effects in ellipsoidal sedimentary basins. Depending on the basin geometry, the aggravation of site effects is different from that of the horizontally layered case.

When the mechanical properties of the sedimentary basin are known, we may simulate site effects numerically. Figure 4 depicts the amplification phenomenon for the city of Caracas. The amplification level of a plane wave ($SH$) is computed by the Boundary Element Method in the frequency domain. Each color map displays the amplification level $A_0$ at a given frequency $f_0$ :

- top: $f_0=0.3Hz ~;~ A_0=2.53$. Site effects due to the topography clearly occur at the top of the hill (right). Nevertheless, site effects due to the sedimentary basin lead to a larger amplification.
- middle: $f_0=0.4Hz ~;~ A_0=8.83$. Topographical site effects are negligible when compared to that due to the basin (4 times larger than at 0.3 Hz).
- bottom: $f_0=0.6Hz ~;~ A_0=7.11$. Site effects in the basin are of the same order than at 0.4 Hz but we notice a much shorter wavelength.

Numerous geological sites have been investigated by various researchers for weak earthquakes as well as for strong ones (cf synthesis). In the latter case, it is necessary to account for the nonlinear behavior of the soil under large loading or even the soil liquefaction which may lead to the soil failure.

== See also ==
- Earthquakes
- Earthquake engineering
- Plate tectonics
- Seismic hazard
- Seismic intensity scales
- Seismic magnitude scales
- Seismic risk
- Seismic waves
- Seismology
- Near-surface geophysics
