= 1952 Damxung earthquake =

Earthquake in China

- Location within Tibet
- UTC time: 1952-08-17 16:02:14
- ISC event: 893286
- USGS-ANSS: ComCat
- Local date: August 18, 1952
- Local time: 00:02:14
- Magnitude: 7.5 M_{w}
- Depth: 25 km (16 mi)
- Epicenter: 30°38′53″N 91°36′4″E
- Areas affected: China
- Max. intensity: MMI X (Extreme)
- Casualties: 54+

The 1952 Damxung earthquake struck Tibet with moment magnitude of 7.5 in the early morning hours of August 18. The epicenter was located in the Nyenchen Tanglha Mountains in Damxung County, Lhasa Prefecture, Tibet, People's Republic of China. There was significant damage in Damxung (Dangquka) and nearby Nagqu County. It was felt in Lhasa, over 100 km (62 mi) to the south.

The earthquake damaged Reting Monastery and 54 people died at Reting (Razheng) and Tangmu. The total number of fatalities is unknown.

Damxung County suffered another significant earthquake in 2008, further southwest parallel to the Nyenchen Tanglha Mountains.
