= Qomolangma National Park =

National park in Tibet, China

Coordinates: 28.1°N 86.8°E

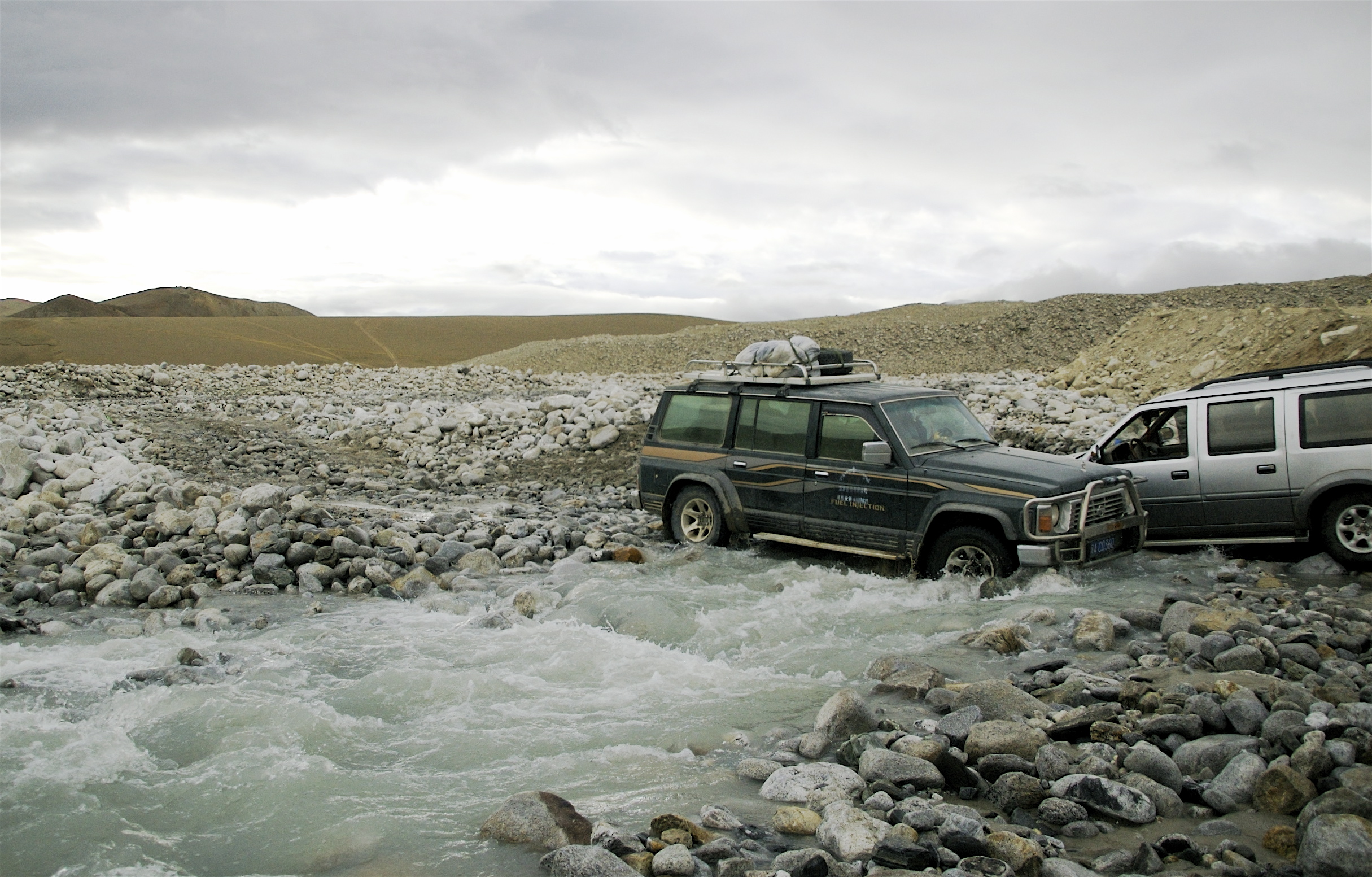
A part of the Qomolangma (Mount Everest) trail

Qomolangma National Park (Chinese: 珠穆朗玛国家公园) is a national park located in Xigazê Prefecture, Tibet Autonomous Region, China, and bordering Nepal. Qomolangma is the Tibetan word for Mount Everest, the northern part of which lies in the park.

Qomolangma National Nature Preserve was founded in 1988 and was deemed by Guinness World Records to be the world's highest nature preserve. In 1993, the State Council of China raised its status and reclassified it as a national park. Officially opened in 2012, the park occupies 78,000 square kilometres (30,000 sq mi).

== Mountains ==
Five of the fourteen "eight-thousander" (over 8000 m/26,000 feet high) mountains in the world lie at least partially within the park:

- Everest at 8,848.86 metres (29,031.7 ft)
- Lhotse at 8,516 metres (27,940 ft)
- Makalu at 8,485 metres (27,838 ft)
- Cho Oyu at 8,201 metres (26,906 ft)
- Shishapangma at 8,027 metres (26,335 ft).

There are two Everest base camps used by mountaineers for their ascents, as well as hikers: the more-popular South Base Camp on the Nepal side of the mountain and the lesser-known North Base Camp in the park.

== Flora and fauna ==
In 2004, Qomolangma was designated a UNESCO Biosphere Reserve. It is home to:

- the snow leopard
- the Himalayan tahr, a species related to sheep and goats
- Picea smithiana, a species of evergreen tree
- Pinus roxburghii, a species of pine tree

"According to preliminary [UNESCO] statistics, the Reserve is now home to 491 terrestrial vertebrate species in 93 families and 30 orders, among which there are 9 amphibian species in 4 families and 1 order, 11 reptile species in 4 families and 1 order, 390 bird species in 62 families and 18 orders, accounting for more than 80% of the known bird species in Tibet, and 82 mammal species in 23 families and 10 orders, an increase of 29 species compared with the initial record. The number of higher plant species increased by 202 from 2,348 species to 2,550 species."

== Population ==
As of 2016, there were 4 counties, 31 towns and 292 administrative villages within the park, with a population of 97,705 distributed as follows:

- 14,708 living in Gyirong County
- 56,102 in Tingri County
- 9456 in Dinggyê County
- 16,819 in Nyalam County

== Tourism ==
The number of visitors to the area rose from 13,374 in 2008 to 73,000 in 2012, according to figures provided by the Dingri county tourism bureau. In 2008, the zone received 2,698 foreign tourists, but by 2010 a record 18,700 foreigners visited the area, the highest number for five years. From just 1 January to 20 May 20 2024, around 136,000 tourists visited the "Mount Qomolangma scenic spot".
