= 2008 Damxung earthquake =

Earthquake in Xizang, China

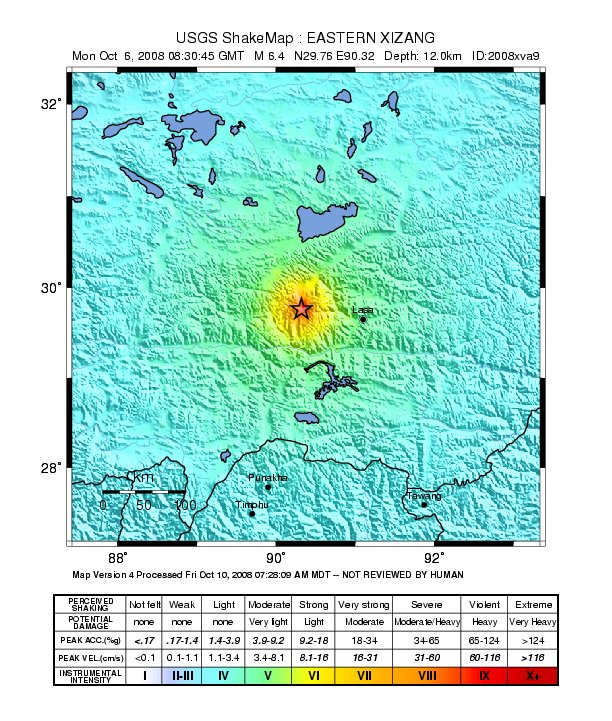
- UTC time: 2008-10-06 08:30:45
- ISC event: 13396168
- USGS-ANSS: ComCat
- Local date: October 6, 2008
- Local time: 16:30:45 CST
- Magnitude: 6.4 M_{w}
- Depth: 10 km (6.2 mi)
- Epicenter: 29°45′32.4″N 90°18′7.2″E
- Type: Normal
- Areas affected: China
- Max. intensity: MMI VII (Very strong)
- Casualties: 10 deaths 11 serious injuries

The 2008 Damxung earthquake hit Damxung County, Tibet Autonomous Region, west of Lhasa, in the People's Republic of China around 16:30 China Standard Time on October 6. The Chinese state media reported that the earthquake caused 10 deaths as of October 7. Three aftershocks above magnitude 5 followed.

The 2008 Damxung earthquake struck further southwest than the similar 1952 Damxung earthquake.

== See also ==
- List of earthquakes in 2008
- List of earthquakes in China
