= Mount Qingyuan =

Mountain and national park in Fujian, China

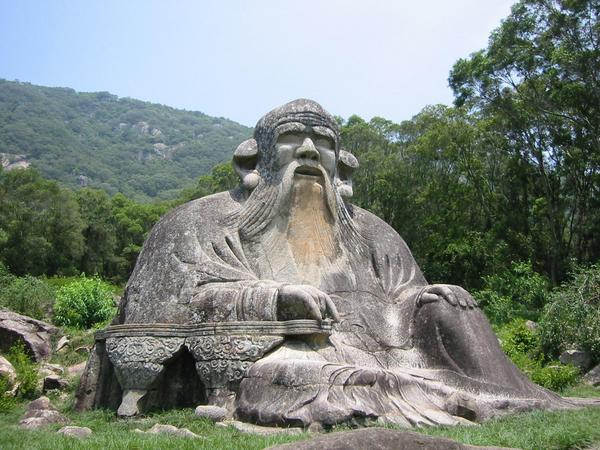
- Stone statue of Laozi at the foot of Mount Qingyuan

Highest point
- Elevation: 498 m (1,634 ft)
- Coordinates: 24°57′17″N 118°36′29″E

Geography
- Location within Fujian
- Location: near Quanzhou, Fujian, China

Jiuri Mountain Wind-Praying Inscriptions
UNESCO World Heritage Site
- Interactive map of Jiuri Mountain Wind-Praying Inscriptions
- Location: China
- Part of: Quanzhou: Emporium of the World in Song-Yuan China
- Criteria: Cultural: (iv)
- Reference: 1561
- Inscription: 2021 (44th Session)

Mount Qingyuan (Chinese: 清源山; pinyin: Qīngyuán Shān; Tâi-lô: Tshing-guân Suann) is a mountain and national park protecting it, Fujian Province, located in the East China region of China.

== Geography ==
The mountain is located about 3 km (1.9 mi) from Quanzhou city. The summit is 498 m (1,634 ft) above sea level.

=== National park ===
Mount Qingyuan National Park protects a total area of 62 km^{2} (24 sq mi). It includes three major scenic features, the namesake Mount Qingyuan, and Mount Ling and Mount Jiuri.

== History ==
Mount Qingyuan has been famous since the Tang dynasty of Imperial China. The earliest mention of Mount Qingyuan is from around 221–207 BCE. Rapid development of Mount Qingyuan began in 618–1279 CE, and reached its peak during 1297 to 1911.

The centuries of development on Mount Qingyuan has imprinted various important historical and cultural artifacts. Such examples include nine huge Taoist and Buddhist stone sculptures, 600 stone inscriptions, and 3 granite stones. This includes the "Four Superlatives": the stone statue of Laozi; the stone statues of Buddha for Three Lives; the holy Islamic tombs; and the "pray for wind stone" inscriptions. The site also contains the shrine of Master Honyi.

The statue of Laozi is famed as being the largest stone carving of him made during the Song dynasty. It is a Major Historical and Cultural Site Protected at the National Level; and measures 8.01m in length, 6.85m in width, and 5.63m in height, occupying an area of 55 square metres.

In 2021, the wind-praying inscriptions on Mount Jiuri were inscribed on the UNESCO World Heritage List because of its medieval religious importance and its testimony to the global maritime trade that centered on Quanzhou in the Song and Yuan dynasties.

== See also ==
- Mountains of Fujian
- Mountains of China
