= Seismic intensity scales =

Intensity of ground shaking during an earthquake

Seismic intensity scales categorize the intensity or severity of ground shaking (quaking) at a given location, such as resulting from an earthquake. They are distinguished from seismic magnitude scales, which measure the magnitude or overall strength of an earthquake, which may, or perhaps may not, cause perceptible shaking.

Intensity scales are based on the observed effects of the shaking, such as the degree to which people or animals were alarmed, and the extent and severity of damage to different kinds of structures or natural features. The maximal intensity observed, and the extent of the area where shaking was felt (see isoseismal map, below), can be used to estimate the location and magnitude of the source earthquake; this is especially useful for historical earthquakes where there is no instrumental record.

== Ground shaking ==
Ground shaking can be caused in various ways (volcanic tremors, avalanches, large explosions, etc.), but shaking intense enough to cause damage is usually due to rupturing of the Earth's crust known as earthquakes. The intensity of shaking depends on several factors:

- The "size" or strength of the source event, such as measured by various seismic magnitude scales.
- The type of seismic wave generated, and its orientation.
- The depth of the event.
- The distance from the source event.
- Site response due to local geology

Site response is especially important as certain conditions, such as unconsolidated sediments in a basin, can amplify ground motions as much as ten times.

Isoseismal map for the 1968 Illinois earthquake, showing the extent of different levels of shaking. The irregularity of areas is due to ground conditions and the underlying geology.

Where an earthquake is not recorded on seismographs, an isoseismal map showing the intensities felt at different areas can be used to estimate the location and magnitude of the quake. Such maps are also useful for estimating the shaking intensity, and thereby the likely level of damage to be expected from a future earthquake of similar magnitude. In Japan, this kind of information is used when an earthquake occurs to anticipate the severity of damage to be expected in different areas.

The intensity of local ground-shaking depends on several factors besides the magnitude of the earthquake, one of the most important being soil conditions. For instance, thick layers of soft soil (such as fill) can amplify seismic waves, often at a considerable distance from the source. At the same time, sedimentary basins will often resonate, increasing the duration of shaking. This is why, in the 1989 Loma Prieta earthquake, the Marina district of San Francisco was one of the most damaged areas, though it was nearly 100 kilometres (60 mi) from the epicenter. Geological structures were also significant, such as where seismic waves passing under the south end of San Francisco Bay reflected off the base of the Earth's crust towards San Francisco and Oakland. A similar effect channeled seismic waves between the other major faults in the area.

== History ==
The first simple classification of earthquake intensity was devised by Domenico Pignataro in the 1780s. The first recognizable intensity scale in the modern sense of the word was drawn up by the German mathematician Peter Caspar Nikolaus Egen in 1828. However, the first modern mapping of earthquake intensity was made by Robert Mallet, an Irish engineer who was sent by Imperial College, London, to research the December 1857 Basilicata earthquake, also known as The Great Neapolitan Earthquake of 1857. The first widely adopted intensity scale, the 10-grade Rossi–Forel scale, was introduced in the late 19th century. In 1902, Italian seismologist Giuseppe Mercalli, created the Mercalli Scale, a new 12-grade scale. Significant improvements were achieved, mainly by Charles Francis Richter during the 1950s, when (1) a correlation was found between seismic intensity and the Peak ground acceleration (PGA; see the equation that Richter found for California). and (2) a definition of the strength of the buildings and their subdivision into groups (called type of buildings) was made. Then, the seismic intensity was evaluated based on the degree of damage to a given type of structure. That gave the Mercalli Scale, as well as the European MSK-64 scale that followed, a quantitative element representing the vulnerability of the building's type. Since then, that scale has been called the Modified Mercalli intensity scale (MMS) and the evaluations of the seismic intensities are more reliable.

In addition, more intensity scales have been developed and are used in different parts of the world:

Country/Region	Seismic intensity scale used
China	Liedu scale (GB/T 17742–1999)
Europe	European macroseismic scale (EMS-98)
Hong Kong	Modified Mercalli scale (MM)
India	Medvedev–Sponheuer–Karnik scale
Indonesia	Modified Mercalli scale (MM)
Israel	Medvedev–Sponheuer–Karnik scale (MSK-64)
Japan	JMA Seismic Intensity Scale
Kazakhstan	Medvedev–Sponheuer–Karnik scale (MSK-64)
Philippines	PHIVOLCS earthquake intensity scale (PEIS)
Russia	Medvedev–Sponheuer–Karnik scale (MSK-64)
Taiwan	Central Weather Administration seismic intensity scale
United States	Modified Mercalli scale (MM)

== See also ==
- Earthquake engineering
- Peak ground acceleration
- Seismic performance
- Spectral acceleration

== Sources ==
- Alexander, David (1993), Natural Disasters (1 ed.), Springer Science+Business Media, ISBN 978-0-412-04741-1.
- Bolt, Bruce A. (1988), Earthquakes (2 ed.), W. H. Freeman and Company, ISBN 978-0716718741.
- Bolt, Bruce A. (1993), Earthquakes and geological discovery, Scientific American Library, ISBN 0-7167-5040-6.
- Bormann, P.; Wendt, S.; Di Giacomo, D. (2013), "Chapter 3: Seismic Sources and Source Parameters", in Bormann (ed.), New Manual of Seismological Observatory Practice 2 (NMSOP-2), doi:10.2312/GFZ.NMSOP-2_ch3, archived from the original (PDF) on 2019-08-04.
- Doi, K. (2010), "Operational Procedures of Contributing Agencies" (PDF), Bulletin of the International Seismological Centre, 47 (7–12): 25, ISSN 2309-236X, archived from the original (PDF) on 2022-01-20. Also available here (sections renumbered).
- Lapajne, Janez (1984), "The MSK-78 intensity scale and seismic risk", Engineering Geology, 20 (1–2): 105–112, doi:10.1016/0013-7952(84)90047-4.
- Mallet, Robert (1862), Great Neapolitan Earthquake of 1857: The First Principles of Observational Seismology as Developed in the Report to the Royal Society of London of the Expedition Made by Command of the Society Into the Interior of the Kingdom of Naples, to Investigate the Circumstances of the Great Earthquake of December 1857, vol. 1, Chapman & Hall.
- Richter, Charles F. (1958), Elementary Seismology (1 ed.), London & San Francisco: W. H. Freeman and Company.
