= China Earthquake Networks Center =

Institution under the China Earthquake Administration

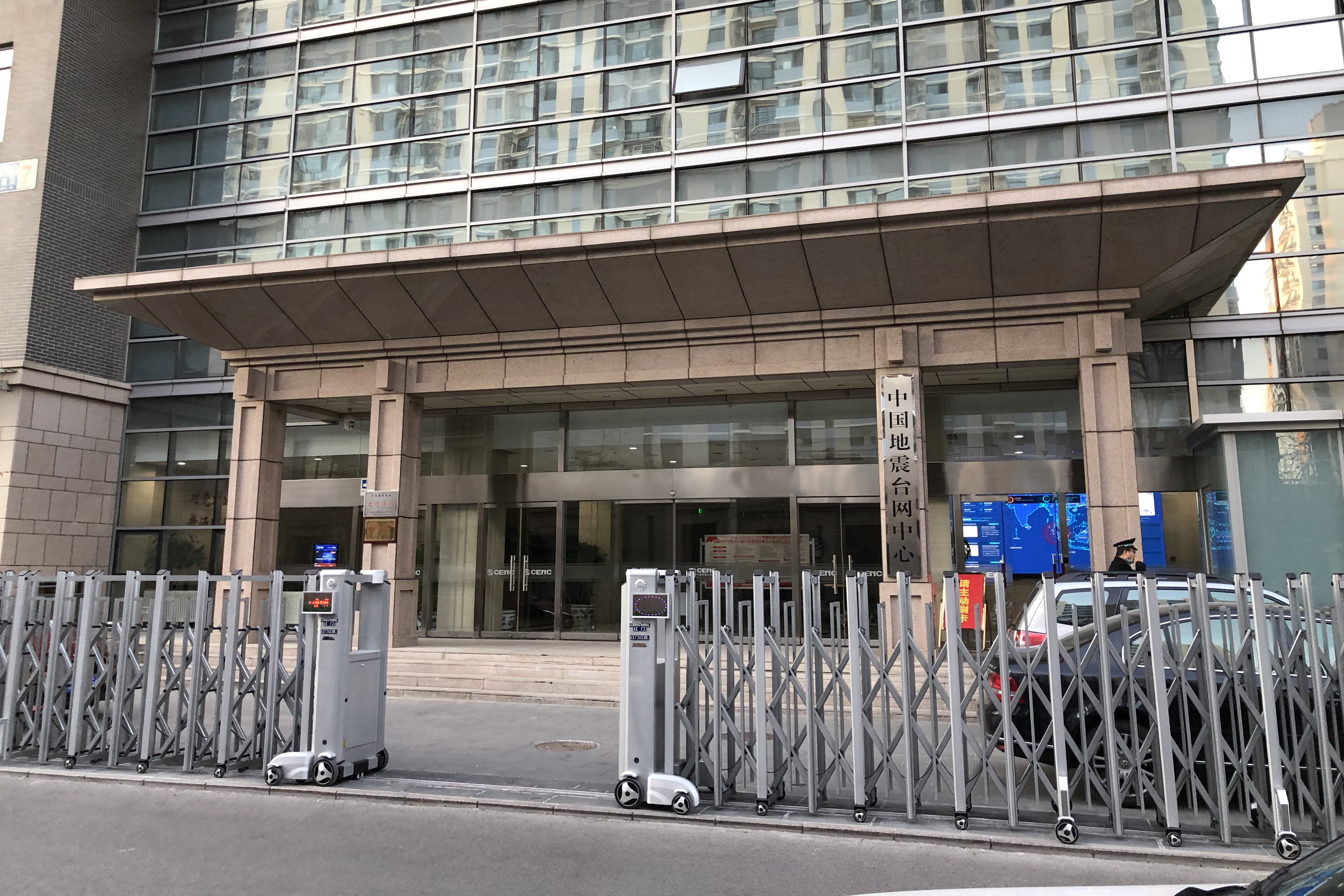
CENC headquarters in Beijing, December 2020.

The China Earthquake Networks Center (CENC; Chinese: 中国地震台网中心; pinyin: Zhōngguó dìzhèn tái wǎng zhōngxīn) is an institution under the China Earthquake Administration. Established on October 18, 2004, it is one of the most important hubs of China's earthquake disaster reduction network and the basis of information for the international community. It is responsible for the operational guidance and management of the national seismic network, short-term earthquake prediction, earthquake data collection, report processing, scientific journal management, seismological construction, technological research and operations for emergency response and relief including the State Council of the People's Republic of China's earthquake relief headquarters.
