= China seismic intensity scale =

Earthquake intensity scale

The China seismic intensity scale (CSIS) is a national standard of the People's Republic of China used to measure seismic intensity. Similar to the EMS-92 on which CSIS drew reference, seismic impacts are classified into 12 degrees of intensity, or liedu (Chinese: 烈度; pinyin: lièdù; lit. 'degrees of violence') in Roman numerals from I for insensible to XII for landscape reshaping.

The scale was initially formalized by the China Earthquake Administration (CEA) in 1980 and is therefore often referred to by its original title as "China Seismic Intensity Scale (1980)". It was later revised, and adopted as national standard (Guobiao) series GB/T 17742-1999 by the National Quality and Technology Supervision Administration (now the General Administration of Quality Supervision, Inspection, and Quarantine of P.R.C., AQSIQ) in 1999. The standard was set for revision not long before the 2008 Sichuan earthquake.The current scale is based from national standard GB/T 17742-2020 published in 2020 and implemented in 2021.

== Liedu scale ==
Unlike the magnitude scales that objectively estimate the released seismic energy, liedu denotes how strongly an earthquake affects a specific place. It is determined by a combination of subjective evaluations (such as human senses and building damage) and objective kinetic measures. Building damage is further specified with a combination of descriptive qualifiers and a numeric evaluation process.

The following is an unofficial translation of the Appendix I of GB/T 17742-1999.

China Seismic Intensity Table
Intensity	Sensations of people on the ground	Degree of building damage		Other seismic phenomena	Horizontal motion on the ground	
Intensity	Sensations of people on the ground	Seismic phenomena	Mean damage index	Other seismic phenomena	Peak acceleration m/s^{2}	Peak velocity m/s
I	Insensible				0.018 (<0.0257)	0.00121 (<0.00177)
II	Sensible by very few still people indoors				0.0369 (0.0258-0.0528)	0.00259 (0.00178-0.00381)
III	Sensible by a few still people indoors	Doors and windows slightly rattle		Suspended objects slightly move	0.0757 (0.0529-0.108)	0.00558 (0.00382-0.00819)
IV	Sensible by most people indoors and a few people outdoors, a few people wake up from sleep	Doors and windows rattle		Suspended objects clearly sway; vessels rattle	0.155 (0.109-0.222)	0.0120 (0.00820-0.0176)
V	Generally sensible by people indoors and sensible by most people outdoors, most people wake up from sleep	Doors, windows, roofs, and building frames shake and rattle; dust falls; tiny cracks appear in plaster; some roof tiles fall; very few roof-top chimneys drop bricks		Unstable objects rock or flip over	0.319 (0.223–0.456)	0.0259 (0.0117–0.0380)
VI	Most people are unable to stand stably, a few people flee outdoors in fright	Damage—cracks appear on walls, roof tiles fall, some roof-top chimneys crack or fall	0–0.10	Cracks appear in river banks and soft soil; saturated sand layers occasionally burst with sand and water; some standalone brick chimneys slightly crack	0.653 (0.457–0.936)	0.0557 (0.0381–0.0817)
VII	The large majority of people flee outdoors in fright, sensible by bicycle riders, sensible by people in moving motor vehicles	Slight destruction— local destruction, cracking, may continue to be used with minor repairs or without repair	0.11– 0.30	River banks collapse; saturated sand layers frequently burst with sand and water, and there are more cracks in soft soil; the large majority of standalone brick chimneys are moderately destroyed	1.35 (0.937-1.94)	0.120 (0.0818-0.176)
VIII	Most people rock and shake, walking is difficult	Moderate destruction— structural destruction, continued usage requires repair	0.31– 0.50	Cracks also appear in hard dry soils; the large majority of standalone brick chimneys are severely destroyed; treetops bend and break; building destruction causes casualties in humans and livestock	2.79 (1.95-4.01)	0.258 (0.177-0.378)
IX	Moving people fall	Severe destruction— severe structural destruction, localized collapse, repairs are difficult	0.51– 0.70	Many cracks appear in hard dry soils; cracks and dislocations may appear in bedrock; landslides and collapses are frequent; many standalone brick chimneys collapse	5.77 (4.02–8.30)	0.555 (0.379–0.814)
X	Bicycle riders will fall, people in an unstable state will fall away from their original positions, there is a sense of being thrown upward	The large majority collapse	0.71– 0.90	Landslides and earthquake fractures appear; arch bridges founded on bedrock are destroyed; the large majority of standalone brick chimneys break or collapse from their bases	11.9 (8.31–17.2)	1.19 (0.815–1.75)
XI		Generally collapse	0.91– 1.00	Earthquake fractures extend a long way; many landslides	24.7 (17.3-35.5)	2.57 (1.76-3.77)
XII				Drastic change in landscape, mountains, and rivers	>35.5	>3.77

Notes about qualifiers: "very few" is less than 10%; "few" is 10%–50%; "most" is 50%–70%; "large majority" is 70%–90%; "generally" is above 90%.

== Applications ==
Historic local seismic intensity is an important reference in quakeproofing existing and future buildings. The national standard Code for Seismic Design of Buildings (GB 500011-2001), published in 2001 and partially revised shortly after the 2008 Sichuan earthquake, includes a list of intensities that each building in designated cities is expected to resist.

== See also ==
- Seismic intensity scales
- Seismic magnitude scales
- Seismic engineering
