= 2021 Dali earthquake =

Earthquake in China

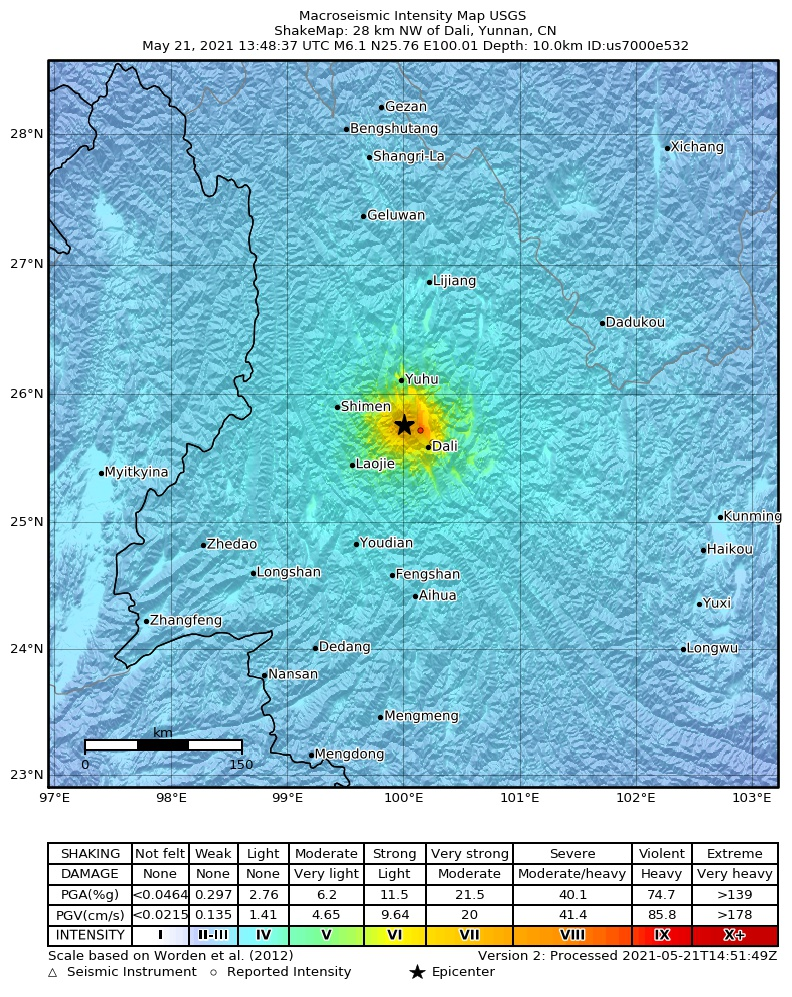
- UTC time: 2021-05-21 13:48:37
- ISC event: 625916004
- USGS-ANSS: ComCat
- Local date: 2021-05-21
- Local time: 21:48 (China Standard Time)
- Magnitude: 6.1 M_{w}
- Depth: 10.0 km (6.2 mi)
- Epicenter: 25.761°N 100.008°E
- Fault: Red River Fault
- Type: Strike-slip
- Areas affected: Dali City, Yunnan, China
- Total damage: ¥3.32 billion (US$516 million)
- Max. intensity: CSIS VIII MMI IX (Violent)
- Foreshocks: M_{w} 5.2
- Aftershocks: 27 above M_{w}4.0 (Strongest is 5.1 M_{w})
- Casualties: 3 dead, 32 injured

On May 21, 2021, a 6.1 magnitude earthquake struck the Dali City, Yunnan, China, at a depth of 10.0 km. Three people died during the quake, while another 32 were injured. The earthquake was referred by the Chinese media as the 5.21 earthquake or 2021 Yangbi earthquake.

== Tectonic setting ==
Yunnan lies at the southeastern boundary of the Tibetan Plateau where strike-slip faults accommodate crustal rotation resulting from deformation caused by the ongoing collision between the Indian Plate and the Eurasian Plate which formed the Himalayas and the Tibetan Plateau. The presence of active faults make the region prone to moderate to large earthquakes. Major events in Yunnan Province have occurred in 1833, 1974, 1976, 1988 and 2014. The nearest active faults in Dali City are the Xiaojiang Fault and Red River Fault. The Red River Fault caused two deadly earthquakes in 1925 near Dali and another in 1970 in Tonghai county.

== Earthquake ==
The earthquake was the result of strike-slip faulting at a shallow depth. It had a maximum intensity of IX (Violent) on the Mercalli intensity scale. According to the United States Geological Survey (USGS), the earthquake had a moment magnitude of 6.1 while the China Earthquake Networks Center (CENC) and China Earthquake Administration (CEA) measured the earthquake at 6.4 on the surface-wave magnitude scale. The depth of focus is reported to be 10 km by the USGS and 8 km by the CEA.

Several hours later, an unrelated Mw 7.3 earthquake struck Southern Qinghai province that was felt in the area.

== Casualties ==
Two fatalities were reported in Yangbi County while another three suffered serious injuries. One of the victims, a truck driver, was killed as a result of a rockfall while another woman in a trapped vehicle had leg injuries. A total of 26 people in the county were injured. In Yongping County, the earthquake killed one person, and left another injured. A 28th injury was reported in Dali City. On May 22, a press release said the number of people injured was brought to 32, with seven in serious condition. Five of the seven who are seriously injured suffered trauma to the head and chest, as well as bone fractures.

== Damage ==
The earthquake damaged some 12,882 homes in Yangbi County. Total damage of the earthquake reached ¥3.32 billion (US$516 million).

== See also ==
- List of earthquakes in 2021
- List of earthquakes in China
- List of earthquakes in Yunnan
- 1925 Dali earthquake
