= Tianhuaban Dam =

- Location within China
- Country: China
- Location: Ludian/Qiaojia Counties, Zhaotong, Yunnan Province
- Coordinates: 27°1′41.12″N 103°17′26.67″E
- Purpose: Power
- Status: Operational
- Construction began: 2006
- Opening date: 2011; 15 years ago

Dam and spillways
- Type of dam: Arch, roller-compacted concrete
- Impounds: Niulan River
- Height: 113 m (371 ft)
- Length: 160 m (520 ft)

Reservoir
- Total capacity: 65,700,000 m^{3} (53,300 acre⋅ft)
- Surface area: 2.2 km^{2} (0.85 mi^{2})
- Normal elevation: 1,071 m (3,514 ft)

Tianhuaban Hydropower Station
- Coordinates: 27°2′52.91″N 103°16′28.82″E
- Operator: Yunnan Dianneng Niulan Jiang Hydropower Development Limited
- Commission date: 2011
- Type: Conventional, diversion
- Turbines: 2 x 90 MW Francis-type
- Installed capacity: 180 MW

The Tianhuaban Dam is an arch dam on the Niulan River, a tributary of the Jinsha River. It straddles the border of Ludian and Qiaojia Counties in Yunnan Province, China. The primary purpose of the dam is hydroelectric power generation and it supports a 180 MW power station. In September 2006, construction on the dam's river diversion tunnels commenced. The first two of 90 MW Francis turbine-generator sets was commissioned in February 2011, the second in March of the same year. Water from the reservoir is diverted to a power station about 2.5 km (1.6 mi) downstream on the right bank of the river.

== See also ==
- List of dams and reservoirs in China
- List of tallest dams in China
