= List of earthquakes in Yunnan =

This is a list of earthquakes that have occurred in or have affected Yunnan Province in China.

== Major earthquakes (≥Magnitude 7.0) ==
Date	Location	Magnitude	Deaths	Event name/notes
1499	Yiliang County, Kunming	Unk.	Tens of thousands	Aftershocks continued for 10 months
4 January 1500	Yiliang County, Kunming	Unk.	Tens of thousands	Maximum MMI IX (Violent). Many homes and government buildings collapsed.
6 September 1833	Songming County, Kunming	8.0 M_{s}	6,000	1833 Kunming earthquake
16 March 1925	Binchuan County, Dali City	7.0 M_{s}	5,000	1925 Dali earthquake
26 December 1941	Myanmar–China border region	7.2 M_{w}	6+	Maximum intensity VIII (Severe).
5 January 1970	Tonghai County, Kunming	7.1 M_{w}	15,000+	1970 Tonghai earthquake
10 May 1974	Zhaotong, Zhaoyang District	7.1 M_{s}	20,000	1974 Zhaotong earthquake
29 May 1976	Longling County, Myanmar–China border region	6.9 M_{s}	98	1976 Longling earthquake
29 May 1976	Longling County, Myanmar–China border region	7.0 M_{s}	98	1976 Longling earthquake
6 November 1988	Lancang and Gengma County, Myanmar–China border region	7.7 M_{w}	939	1988 Lancang–Gengma earthquakes
6 November 1988	Lancang and Gengma County, Myanmar–China border region	7.2 M_{s}	939	1988 Lancang–Gengma earthquakes

== Major earthquakes (Magnitude 6.0–6.9) ==
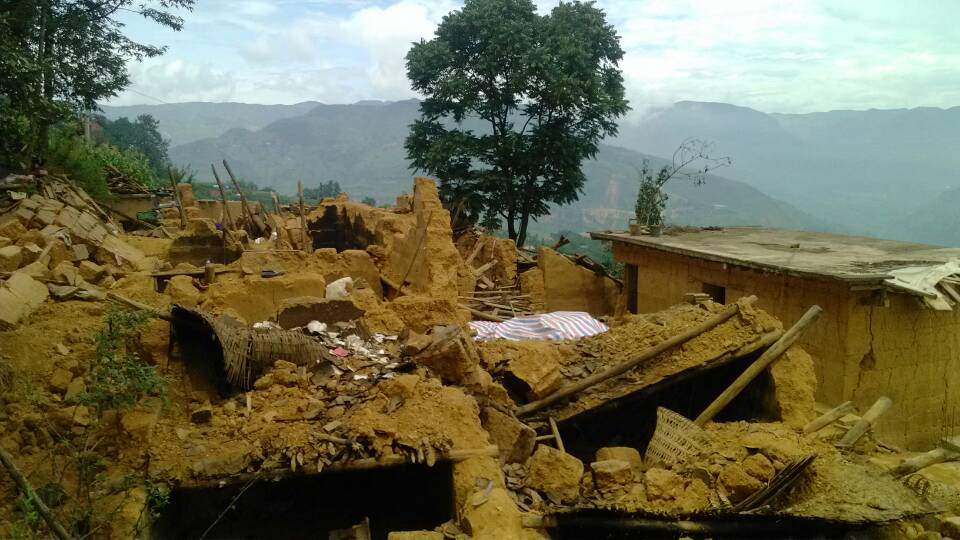
Damage caused by the 2014 Ludian earthquake.

Date	Location	Magnitude	Deaths	Event name/notes
21 December 1913	Eshan County	6.7 M_{w}	942–1,900	1913 Eshan earthquake
30 July 1917	Daguan County	6.8 M_{s}	1,800	Maximum intensity IX (Violent).
12 January 1934	Shiping County	6.0 M_{s}	1	Maximum MMI VIII (Severe).
31 January 1942	China–Laos border region	6.3 M_{w}	90	Hundreds of livestocks killed.
27 June 1948	Jianchuan County	6.8 M_{s}	110	VIII (Severe). At least 100 farm animals killed.
21 December 1951	Jianchuan County	6.3 M_{s}	423	Maximum intensity IX. At least 29,890 homes damaged or destroyed.
23 September 1955	Panzhihua, Sichuan	6.7 M_{w}	728	1955 Yuzha earthquake
5 February 1966	Dongchuan District	6.5 M_{s}	306	Severe damage. Maximum intensity IX.
11 July 1995	Shan State, Myanmar	6.8 M_{w}	11	1995 Myanmar–China earthquake
23 October 1995	Wuding County	6.2 M_{w}	81	1995 Wuding earthquake
3 February 1996	Lijiang, Gucheng District	6.6 M_{w}	322	1996 Lijiang earthquake
21 July 2003	Dayao County	6.1 M_{w}	16	2003 Dayao earthquake
21 August 2008	Yingjiang County, Myanmar–China border region	6.0 M_{w}	5	2008 Yingjiang earthquakes
30 August 2008	Panzhihua, Sichuan–Yunnan border region	6.0 M_{w}	41	2008 Panzhihua earthquake
3 August 2014	11 km west of Wenping, Ludian County	6.2 M_{w}	617	2014 Ludian earthquake
7 October 2014	23 km west southwest of Weiyuan	6.1 M_{w}	1	2014 Jinggu earthquake
21 May 2021	28 km northwest of Dali	6.1 M_{w}	3	2021 Dali earthquake

== Moderately large earthquakes (≤Magnitude 5.9) ==
Date	Location	Magnitude	Deaths	Event name/notes
24 March 1494	Qujing	5.5 M_{s}	3	At least 200 homes destroyed.
18 April 1985	Luquan County	5.8 M_{w}	22	1985 Luquan earthquake
31 January 1993	Dayao County	5.2 M_{w}	2	Minor damage in Dayao County.
19 November 1998	Sichuan–Yunnan border	5.6 M_{wc}	5	1998 Ninglang earthquake
15 January 2000	Yao'an County	5.9 M_{w}	7	2000 Yunnan earthquake
27 October 2001	Yongsheng County	5.5 M_{w}	1	At least 220 people injured and 3,400 buildings were destroyed in Yongsheng.
10 August 2004	Ludian County	5.4 M_{wc}	4	Up to 600 injured; 200 in serious condition and 120,000 people homeless. At least 18,556 homes destroyed, 65,601 homes damaged and 22 reservoirs damaged.
22 July 2006	Yanjin County	4.9 M_{wc}	22	2006 Yanjin earthquake
9 July 2009	Yao'an County	5.7 M_{wc}	1	2009 Yunnan earthquake
10 March 2011	Yingjiang County, Myanmar–China border region	5.5 M_{wc}	26	2011 Yunnan earthquake
7 September 2012	Yiliang County, Sichuan–Yunnan–Guizhou region	5.5 M_{wc}	81	2012 Yiliang earthquakes
7 September 2012	Yiliang County, Sichuan–Yunnan–Guizhou region	5.3 M_{wc}	81	2012 Yiliang earthquakes
24 May 2014	27 km north northwest of Pingyuan, Yingjiang County	5.6 M_{w}	0	2014 Yingjiang earthquake
18 May 2020	42 km west of Zhaotong, Qiaojia County	5.1 M_{w}	4	2020 Qiaojia earthquake
2 January 2022	98 km east of Shangri-La, Ninglang County	5.4 M_{w}	0	At least 22 people injured and homes were damaged in Ninglang County.

== See also ==
- List of earthquakes in China
- List of earthquakes in Myanmar
- List of earthquakes in Sichuan
- Geology of China
