= 1988 Lancang–Gengma earthquakes =

Major earthquakes in the Myanmar–China border region

- Location within China Location within Yunnan
- UTC time: 1988-11-06 13:03:19; 1988-11-06 13:15:43
- ISC event: 419867; 419869
- USGS-ANSS: ComCat; ComCat
- Local date: 6 November 1988
- Local time: 21:03; 21:15
- Magnitude: M_{w} 7.0; M_{w} 6.9
- Depth: 18 km (11 mi); 15 km (9.3 mi)
- Epicenter: China–Myanmar border region 22.789°N 99.611°E
- Fault: Lancang–Gengma Fault Zone
- Type: Strike-slip
- Areas affected: China, Myanmar and Thailand
- Total damage: CN¥ 2.05 billion
- Max. intensity: CSIS IX, CSIS X
- Aftershocks: 600+
- Casualties: 748–939 dead, 7,700 injured

On 6 November 1988, two earthquakes struck Lancang and Gengma counties, Yunnan, near the China–Myanmar border. The first earthquake measured moment magnitude (M_{w}) 7.0, occurring at 21:03 CST. Twelve minutes later, a M_{w} 6.9 earthquake occurred about 60 km (37 mi) to north–northwest. They were caused by movement along the Lancang–Gengma Fault Zone, a 210 km (130 mi) long right-lateral strike-slip fault. Both earthquakes generated oblique-normal surface ruptures with larger displacements reported following the second event.

These earthquakes were assigned a maximum China seismic intensity of IX and X, respectively. Between 748 and 939 people were killed; more than 7,700 were injured, and damage was estimated at CN¥ 2.05 billion. An additional 267,000 people were left homeless. Moderately large aftershocks continued to rock the region, causing additional casualties and damage. During initial recovery efforts, supplies had to be airlifted because landslides blocked roads to the affected areas. Several thousand soldiers participated in providing relief. The Chinese government made an appeal for international assistance.

== Tectonic setting ==
A simplified diagram of bookshelf-style faulting

Situated between the Sagaing and Red River faults, the Shan Plateau contains a network of left- and right-lateral strike-slip faults that accommodate crustal rotation and extrusion of the Sunda Block and deformation caused by the India–Asia continental collision. This tectonically active zone extends across China, Myanmar, Laos, Thailand, and Vietnam, measuring 700 km (430 mi) long and 400 km (250 mi) wide. The regional tectonics are driven by the relative motion between two major right-lateral structures; the Sagaing Fault, a transform boundary between the Burma and Sunda plates, and the Red River Fault of southwest China. Movement between the two major structures divides the crust between them into clockwise-rotating blocks, forming a "bookshelf faulting" zone. Left-lateral faults run roughly perpendicular to the strike of the Sagaing and Red River faults, along the boundaries of these blocks. Meanwhile, right-lateral structures within these blocks occur along pre-existing fractures with strikes that are parallel to the two dominant faults.

The left-lateral fault systems are dominant; following an east–northeast or east–west trend for several hundred kilometers. The longest runs for about 370 km (230 mi) in the southern plateau. These faults exhibit obvious left-lateral displacements in rivers such as the Mekong and Salween and their tributaries. Some of these faults produce "hairpin" shape offsets suggesting the faults may have been left-lateral before reversing slip about 5 to 20 million years ago. The right-lateral structures are less dominant, and follow a north- to north-northwest or northwest strike. They can be divided into two systems; the western faults run subparallel to the Sagaing Fault while the northeast runs subparallel to the Red River Fault. The longest of these are the 400 km (250 mi) Wuliang Shan Fault Zone located southwest of the Red River and the 500 km (310 mi) Kyaukkyan Fault east of the Sagaing Fault. The earthquakes of 1988 were the result of slip along a dextral fault zone. Consequently, many earthquakes in the region such as in 1912, 1913, 1923, 1925, 1935, 1941, 1950, 1970, 1971, 1976, 1983, 1988, 1995, 2007 and 2011 are caused by strike-slip faulting on one of these fault zones.

== Earthquakes ==
The first earthquake measuring M_{w} 7.0 occurred at 21:03 CST on 6 November with an epicenter 21.7 km (13.5 mi) east–southeast of Zhutang in Lancang County, near the Myanmar–China border. Twelve minutes later, at 21:15 CST, a M_{w} 6.9 earthquake struck 63 kilometres (39 mi) north–northwest of the first. The mainshock was caused by right-lateral strike-slip faulting at a shallow depth.

These earthquakes originated along the Lancang Fault Zone (also known as the Lancang–Gengma Fault Zone), a 210 km (130 mi) long right-lateral strike-slip fault trending north–northwest. The northern segment comprise a single strand while southern section features a complex network of individual branches. A 1997 geologic map showed that the fault was a left-lateral fault based on a batholith displaced 30 km (19 mi) by the fault. However, geomorphic features indicate this slip direction recently reversed, becoming a right-lateral fault. The total right-lateral displacement in the Nanguo River valley was estimated at 17 km (11 mi). An average slip rate of about 3.4 mm (0.13 in) per year was derived by assuming right-lateral slip initiated 5 million years ago, near the upper-bound rate derived from geodetic data (0–4 mm (0.00–0.16 in) per year).

The Lancang–Gengma Fault Zone comprise the northern Gengma–Hanmuba segment and southern Lancang–Nanliu segment. The Muga–Heihe and Xiaoheijiang faults intersect these segments to form geometric seismic barriers. The first event initiated on the Lancang–Nanliu segment where it intersects the northwest-trending Muga–Heihe Fault, rupturing bilaterally, 38 km (24 mi) northwest and 32 km (20 mi) southeast, for about 19 seconds at a velocity of 2 km (1.2 mi) per second. The second earthquake, likely triggered by the first, occurred 60 km (37 mi) northwest. A seismic rupture barrier between both segments may have stopped the northwest-propagating rupture of the first event, but was later breached, causing the second earthquake on the Gengma–Hanmuba Fault. This event initiated at the intersection with the east–west trending Xiaoheijiang Fault.

=== Surface rupture ===
The first earthquake generated a surface-rupture zone about 35 km (22 mi) long and 2–3 km (1.2–1.9 mi) across. It comprised four generally continuous linear zones of extensional ground fractures and fault scarps. Each individual strand were several hundred metres to 6 km (3.7 mi) long. In the central rupture zone, along the western bank of the Heihe River, three northwest trending left-stepped fault scarps, each more than a hundred meters long, cut across the Carboniferous shale and Quaternary alluvium of a small ridge. A maximum vertical offset of 1.5 m (4 ft 11 in) and right-lateral offset of 1.4 m (4 ft 7 in) was associated with the first event. The southern segment cuts through limestone, measuring 300 m (980 ft) long, 3–5 m (9.8–16.4 ft) wide and forming a fissure 3 m (9.8 ft) deep.

The second earthquake was associated with a separate 24 km (15 mi) long rupture. A 5 km (3.1 mi) long rupture developed on the eastern flank of Mount Meilengshan, where it produced a maximum throw of 3.5 m (11 ft) and right-lateral slip of 3 m (9.8 ft). Along the northern Xiaoheijiang River bank, on the southeastern ridge of Mount Meilengshan, the fault cuts through limestone, displacing the western block upwards and eastern block downwards. At the top of the ridge, a tree was severed and displaced 0.9 m (2 ft 11 in) laterally and 0.52 m (1 ft 8 in) vertically.

=== Aftershocks ===
By 20 December, over 600 aftershocks greater than M_{s} 3.0 were recorded by the Kunming Telemetered Seismic Network. Three of the largest had M_{s} of 6.1, 6.3 and 6.7 on 15, 27 and 30 November, respectively. The aftershock distribution aligned with the north–northwest trending fault responsible for the earthquakes. Some caused additional damage and injuries. A M_{w} 5.6 aftershock on 7 May 1989 killed 1 and injured 91 others.

=== Intensity ===
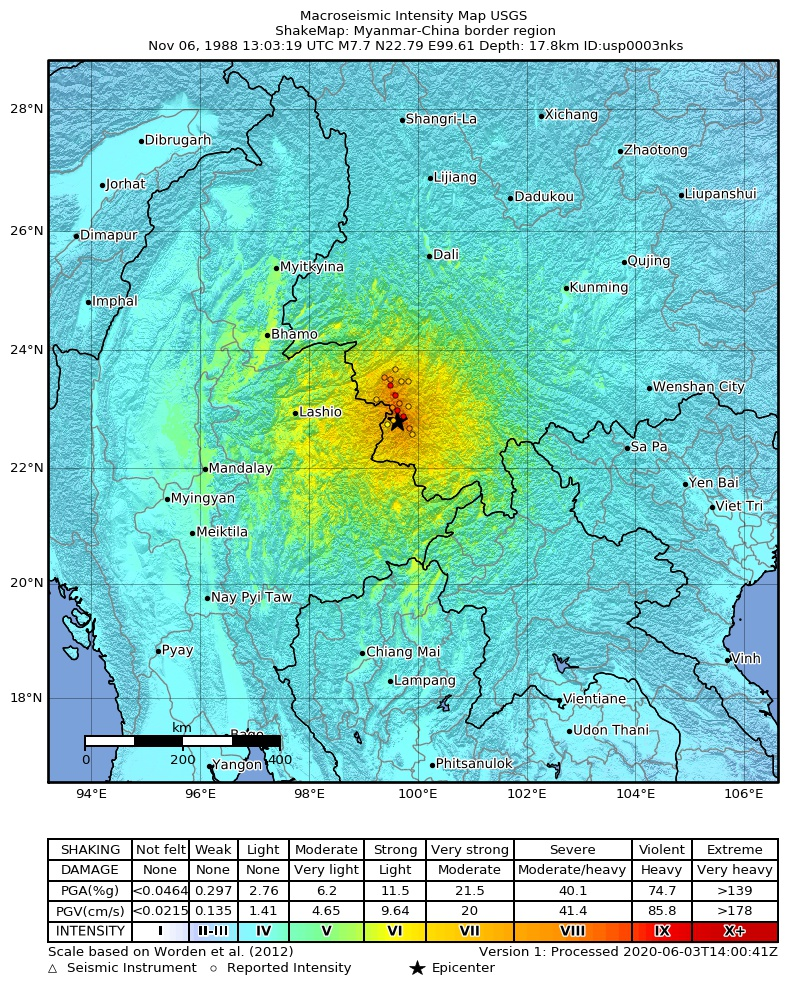
Strong ground motion map for the first mainshock

A combined isoseismal map for both earthquakes was published in Acta Seismologica Sinica in 1992. The isoseismal lines were generally elliptical-shaped with a northwest–southeast trend. For the first event, a maximum intensity of IX was assigned to a 36 km (22 mi) by 6 km (3.7 mi) area based on liquefaction along a river. Wood and bamboo walls collapsed, as did subterranean buildings in the area. The intensity VIII zone encompassed the intensity IX zone. There, many adobe and wooden-framed buildings were damaged.

For the second event, a 12 km (7.5 mi) by 2–4 km (1.2–2.5 mi) area around the epicenter was assigned intensity X. Rockfalls occurred on the eastern slopes of Mount Meilengshan while two landslides occurred along the Xiaoheijiang Fault: one 1,000 m (3,300 ft) by 900 m (3,000 ft) and the other 900 m (3,000 ft) by 720 m (2,360 ft). At six villages and towns within the intensity IX zone, (Note: Mangwong, Mengsheng, Yanglong, Tuanjie, Yanshai and Bangduo) brick and reinforced concrete buildings collapsed.

Intensity VII effects were reported in settlements further away (Note: Langcang, Cangyuan, Shangyun, Dalaba, and Shuangjiang) and in parts of Myanmar. The map combines the intensity VII felt area in both events, encompassing 3,020 km^{2} (1,170 sq mi). In this zone, damage was limited to fallen tiles, dislodged plaster and small cracks in walls while adobe buildings were cracked. The ground motion in Chiang Mai, Chiang Rai and tall buildings of Bangkok were assigned V–VI (Moderate–Strong) on the Modified Mercalli intensity scale.

== Damage and casualties ==
On 8 November, China's State Seismology Bureau placed the number of dead at 18 while Xinhua reported 37 deaths. The Peoples’ Central Broadcasting Station and Radio Beijing, citing a reporter, said about 600 people were killed or injured, with many from the village of Shanmato which was obliterated, though this initial report was not independently verified. At the time of the earthquakes, the population of Lancang and Gengma counties were 237,000 and 81,000, respectively. The civil affairs ministry's Disaster Relief Office said poor communication network made assessing the casualties difficult.

On 9 November, officials placed the death toll at 938. However the state-run evening news said 600 people died and 578 were injured while its English-language counterpart put the toll at 900. Later, Chinese officials lowered the number of dead to 730, rescinding the higher figure. They said the higher figure was not officially announced but United Nations agencies obtained it via the civil affairs ministry and it was widely reported. The International Disasters Data Base listed 939 deaths. It was regarded as China's "worst earthquake in more than a decade".

The Yunnan Provincial Earthquake Bureau said 748 people died; at least 7,700 people seriously injured; over 3 million affected and 267,000 homeless. The death toll could have been higher had these earthquakes struck near a city; additionally, many residents were outdoors at the time, which prevented more deaths. In Lancang County, at least 607 people died including 279 deaths in the town of Zhanmapo.

Heavy damage and causalties were reported in 17 counties; many homes, roads and communication lines in Lancang and Mengliang counties were destroyed. An estimated 200,000 buildings including 144,000 houses were destroyed; another 934,000 buildings were damaged. About 1,000 schools, 98 clinics and 29 reservoirs were also destroyed. Many homes constructed of wood and mud, collapsed, killing their inhabitants. Rockslides with a total accumulated volume of 1,000,000 m^{3} (35,000,000 cu ft) damaged highways and blocked rivers, halting water transportation. The total cost of damage was estimated at CN¥ 2.05 billion.

Some buildings did not suffer heavy damage because of improved designs or seismic retrofitting. Among them, a cinema and an apartment which were strengthened to survive intensity VIII–IX conditions were undamaged. In Thailand, damage was reported in Chiang Rai. In Bangkok, people on high-rise buildings felt weak shaking. The highest floors of the 27-story Charn Issara Tower swayed for a few minutes. The earthquakes were also felt in Laos, Vietnam and Bangladesh.

== Response ==
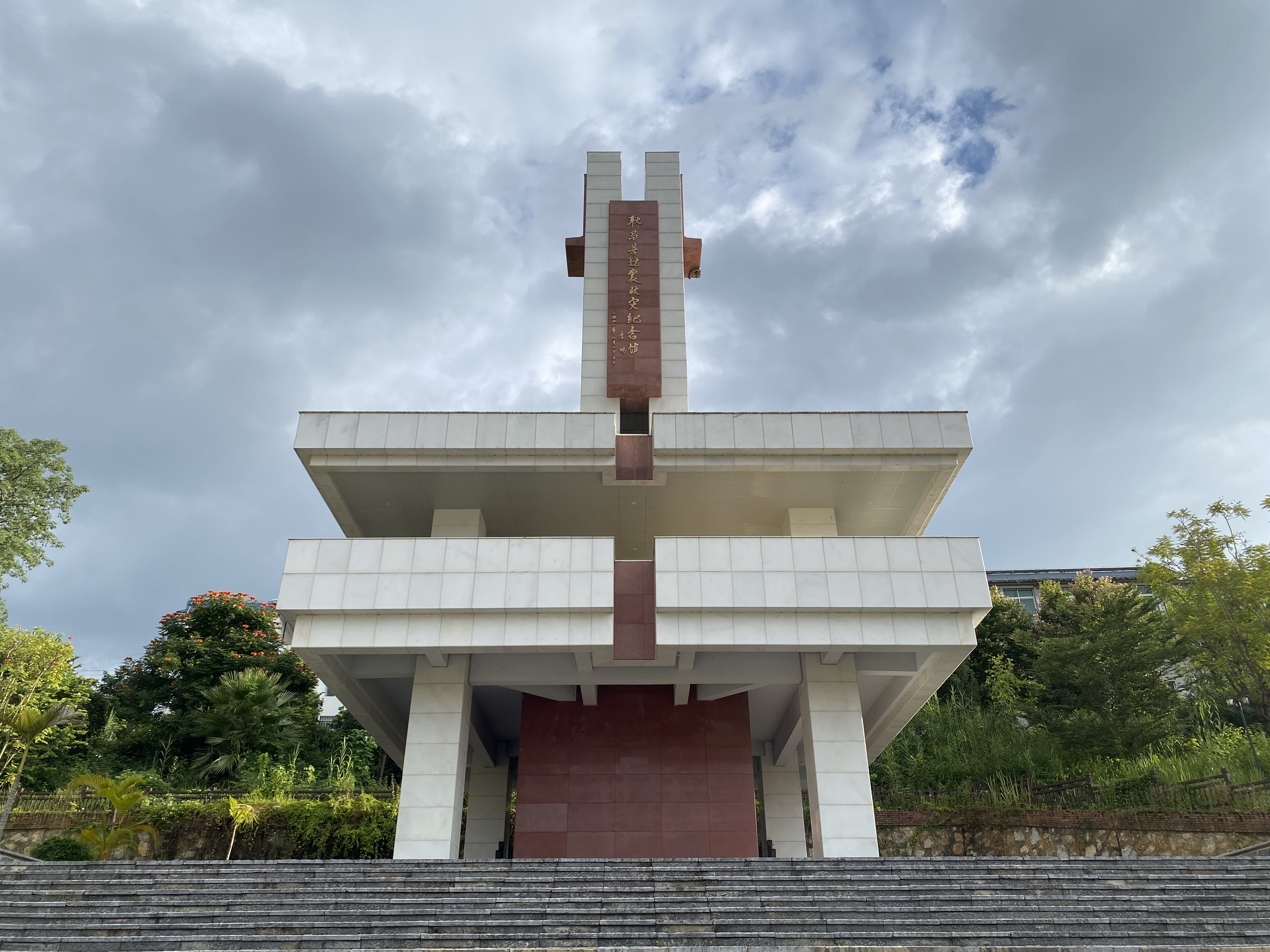
Gengma County earthquake relief monument

The Yunnan government ordered medical and relief supplies be airlifted to the affected areas as landslides blocked off roads. The governor of Yunnan Province, He Zhiqiang, along with several medical doctors travelled to the region. Military rescue and medical personnel reached the affected villages on 8 November. The convoy comprised 30 military trucks which joined several thousand soldiers who were already in the region assisting those affected. Chinese officials appealed for international assistance, with the World Food Programme and United Nations Development Programme saying that authorities were open to aid. These agencies also said that plastic sheets for shelter, medicine and food were needed.

At a press conference following the earthquakes, officials disclosed that the 1970 Tonghai earthquake killed 10,000 people. Knowledge about the 1970 earthquake was never immediately revealed as it occurred during the Cultural Revolution. In the early decades of China's political history, natural disasters and accidents would not be publicly disclosed unless foreign nationals were involved, but started being publicized several years ago.

== See also ==
- List of earthquakes in 1988
- List of earthquakes in China
- List of earthquakes in Myanmar
- List of earthquakes in Yunnan
- List of earthquakes in Thailand
