= 2020 Qiaojia earthquake =

Earthquake in China

- UTC time: 2020-05-18 13:48:00
- ISC event: 618292349
- USGS-ANSS: ComCat
- Local date: May 18, 2020
- Local time: 9:48 p.m. CST
- Magnitude: M_{w} 5.1
- Depth: 10.0 km (6.2 mi)
- Epicenter: 27.266°N 103.288°W
- Areas affected: Yunnan
- Total damage: 101 million yuan (US$14.2 million)
- Max. intensity: MMI VI (Strong)
- Landslides: 167
- Aftershocks: 1 (as of 5/19/20)
- Casualties: 4 dead, 24 injured

The 2020 Qiaojia earthquake (Chinese: 2020年巧家地震) occurred in Yunnan, China, 42 km west of Zhaotong on May 18, 21:48 local time (2020-05-18 13:48 UTC). The moment magnitude 5.1 quake occurred at a depth of 10 km. Various buildings were damaged, and one house collapsed in Zhaoyang District. Four people were killed while 24 people were injured.

== Tectonic setting ==
The lateral spreading of the thickened crust of the Tibetan Plateau, caused by the ongoing collision between the Indian plate and the Eurasian plate, has led to the presence of many active fault zones within the Sichuan-Yunnan region. The largest of these is the Xianshuihe fault system (XFS), a major left-lateral strike-slip structure. This fault system divides into two main strands, the Anninghe-Zemuhe and Daliangshan faults. Near where these two strands rejoin to the south, a SW–NE trending right lateral fault zone is developed on the eastern side of the XFS, the Zhaotong–Ludian fault. The XFS has been the location of many large and damaging earthquakes, such as the 1981 Dawu and 2010 Yushu earthquakes. In 2014 a major earthquake occurred close to the trace of the Zhaotong-Ludian Fault.

== Earthquake ==
The measured magnitude was 5.1 M_{w} with a hypocentral depth of 10 km. The earthquake's focal mechanism showed strike-slip on one of two nodal planes orientated 170° and 263°. The NNW-SSE trending solution matches best with the elongation of isoseismal lines in a 160° direction and the trend of aftershocks within the first 24 hours after the event in a 175° direction. The causative fault has been identified as the Xiaohe-Baogunao Fault based on its orientation and proximity to the epicentre and the area affected by co-seismic landslides. Based on the distribution of aftershocks, the 2014 Ludian earthquake has also been explained by movement along another part of this fault zone.

== Damage ==
There was significant damage to parts of Xiaohe Township in Qiaojia County, with some houses collapsed. Landslides along several roads had to be cleared. Ten telecom base stations were put out of action, but half that number were repaired by the following day. Four deaths were reported, with a further 24 people being injured. Firefighters and a mining rescue team were sent from Zhaotong City to the affected area, with 16 townships being visited by rescuers. Damage of the earthquake amounted to 101 million yuan (US$14.2 million).

The earthquake shaking triggered a large number of landslides on the slopes of the surrounding hills. 167 separate landslides were mapped, with the largest having an area of 8,345 m^{2}. The total estimated volume of all the landslides was 2.97 million m^{3}.

== See also ==
- List of earthquakes in 2020
- List of earthquakes in Yunnan
