= 1995 Myanmar–China earthquake =

Earthquake in Southeast Asia

1995 Menglian earthquake
- Location within Myanmar
- UTC time: 1995-07-11 21:46:39
- ISC event: 93325
- USGS-ANSS: ComCat
- Local date: 12 July 1995
- Magnitude: 7.3 M_{s} 6.8 M_{w}
- Depth: 12.5 km (7.8 mi) (USGS); 9.0 km (5.6 mi) (CEA)
- Epicenter: 21.966°N 99.196°E
- Areas affected: Myanmar, China & Thailand
- Total damage: US$36.1 million
- Max. intensity: MMI VIII (Severe) CSIS VIII
- Landslides: Yes
- Foreshocks: 6.2 M_{L} & 5.5 M_{L}
- Aftershocks: Yes
- Casualties: 11 dead, 136 injured

The 1995 Menglian earthquake or Myanmar–China earthquake occurred on 12 July at 05:46 local time in the Myanmar–China border region. The earthquake had an epicenter on the Myanmar side of the border, located in the mountainous region of Shan State. It registered 7.3 on the Chinese surface-wave magnitude scale (M_{s}) and 6.8 on the moment magnitude scale (M_{w}). With a maximum Mercalli intensity assigned at VIII, it killed 11 people and left another 136 injured. Over 100,000 homes in both countries were destroyed and 42,000 seriously damaged. Some damage to structures were also reported in Chiang Mai and Chiang Rai, Thailand. The low death toll from this earthquake was attributed to an early warning issued prior to it happening. Precursor events including foreshocks and some seismic anomalies led to an evacuation of the area before the mainshock struck. It is thought to be one of the few successfully predicted earthquakes in history.

== Tectonic setting ==
The Shan Plateau which encompass Yunnan and Shan State is crisscrossed by strike-slip structures to accommodate crustal rotation of the Sunda Block and deformation as a result of the India-Asia collision where the Indian plate is underthrusted beneath the Eurasian plate. The Shan Plateau formed by uplift along the Shan Scarp Fault Zone, an inactive shear zone and reverse or thrust fault along its western base. Located east of the Shan Scarp Fault is the active Sagaing Fault, a dextral transform fault that separates the Burma plate from the Sunda plate. At the northern boundary of the Shan Plateau lies the Red River Fault, an active 1,000 km-long dextral fault. Bookshelf-style faulting as a result of shear deformation between the Red River and Sagaing faults have resulted in predominantly right-lateral strike-slip faulting within the Shan Plateau.

== Earthquake ==
The earthquake occurred as a result of dextral strike-slip faulting at a shallow depth in the Shan Plateau. It ruptured a previously unmapped northwest–southeast striking strike-slip structure not far from the faults involved in the 1988 Lancang–Gengma earthquakes. Strike-slip faulting within the Shan Plateau are the result of "bookshelf-style" faulting, caused by crustal deformation as it is situated between the Sagaing Fault and Red River Fault. The 1995 earthquake may have been triggered by increased coulomb stress transfer from the 1988 earthquake.

Modelling of the earthquake suggest most of the displacements in the southeastern rupture zone occurred at depths of 0–6 km (0.0–3.7 mi). The greatest slip was detected at 4 km (2.5 mi) beneath the surface, having moved by 1.9 m (6 ft 3 in). In the northwestern rupture, the fault had a maximum slip of 2.5 m (8 ft 2 in) detected at 5 km (3.1 mi) depth. Rupture was also detected on the surface. The total length of the northwestern and southeastern rupture is approximately 38 km (24 mi).

=== Foreshocks and aftershocks ===
In the days leading up to the mainshock in this earthquake sequence, there was a series of foreshocks. The largest of which measured 5.5 and 6.2 on the Richter scale (M_{L}). According to the Yunnan Seismic Network Center, in the 100 days after the M_{s} 7.3 mainshock, some 872 aftershocks were recorded with a magnitude greater than 2.0 M_{L}. Most of the aftershocks were recorded within the first 100 days after the earthquake. The aftershocks only released 4% of the total energy released during the mainshock.

The United States Geological Survey recorded the largest foreshocks at 5.9 M_{w} and 5.0 mb. Three additional foreshocks had magnitudes of 4.9 or 4.7. The 5.9 M_{w} foreshock caused some damage in Menglian County and was felt in Thailand.

=== Prediction ===
Between 19 September 1994 and 12 May 1995, a cluster of earthquakes measuring 4.7 M_{s} or greater was detected on the Myanmar-China border region. Seismologists also detected strange anomalies in the seismological parameters in that region. Changes to water levels in Shidian County were also interpreted as signs of a large earthquake.

After the 6.2 M_{L} foreshock on July 10, the Yunnan Seismological Bureau dispatched a team to the region closest to the epicenter. A meeting was also conducted and seismologists concluded that a mainshock of magnitude of ~7.0 should strike. An evacuation order was recommended by scientists from the Yunnan Provincial Earthquake Administration after the forecast. Less than 30 hours after that forecast, the mainshock struck.

=== Intensity ===
The area with the greatest shaking intensity was in Myanmar. In Yunnan Province, the earthquake was strongly felt over an area 10,400 km^{2} (4,000 sq mi). The districts and prefectures in Yunnan that were affected included the Simao District, Linxiang District and Xishuangbanna Dai Autonomous Prefecture. Thirty-nine townships and 2,242 villages across five counties; Menglian, Ximeng, Lancang, Cangyuan and Menghai were located within the earthquake zone, impacting an estimated 127,420 households housing 577,188 people.

Intensity VIII on the China seismic intensity scale covered an area of 110 km^{2} in Yunnan. Many brick and wood constructed walls of residential buildings suffered large cracks. Structural deformation to roof trusses and some building collapses occurred within this intensity zone. North-east and northwest-trending fissures up to 2 m (6 ft 7 in) wide were reported. These fissures ran for approximately 2 km. Some minor landslides were also observed.

The zone of intensity VII extended north at Wenggake of Ximeng County, Menglian County in the east and Lalei in the south for an area of 1,580 km^{2} (610 sq mi). Many brick and wood constructed homes in this zone were severely cracked. Many walls were either badly damaged or had totally collapsed. Some roof shingles on homes also suffered major damage during the tremor.

Intensity VI zone covered a 10,400 km^{2} (4,000 sq mi) area, from extends to Nuoliang in Cangyuan County in the north, Fubang in Lancang County in the east, and Daluo in Menghai County in the south. Most masonry and wooden buildings had minor damage such as small cracks in the walls. Minimal damage on roof shingles on most structures in the zone. Overall, most structures had limited damage because they were well retrofitted and constructed with seismic codes in place after the 1988 earthquakes.

== Aftermath ==
A preliminary report by the UN Department of Humanitarian Affairs on July 12 said two women died of heart attacks while 36 individuals were injured, two of them seriously. Nineteen buildings were destroyed while many schools, factories and public infrastructures were damaged. A team of scientists were assigned to survey the area but could not reach the affected area due to road damage.

In Chiang Rai, Thailand, the earthquake damaged a major electrical generator, cutting power. The Government of Thailand also ordered that dams reserviors and bridges be inspected for damage.

According to an estimate by Xinhua news agency on July 19, the total damage caused by earthquake was US$36 million. At least 329 schools, 143 hospitals, 200,000 homes, 165 government offices and more than 500 factories and military bases in Menglian, Ximeng, Lancang and Cangyuan counties were significantly damaged by the quake. The death toll was also revised to 11 while the number of injured rose to 136. A further 600,000 people were impacted by the quake as well.

After the mainshock struck, the Yunnan Seismological Bureau immediately entered a state of emergency, establishing headquarters and sending more scientists to Menglian to plan disaster assessments, inspections, surveillance, and send reports. The National Earthquake Administration and the People's Government of Yunnan Province formally praised the Yunnan Seismological Bureau for the prediction of the earthquake, resulting in a minimal loss of life.

== See also ==
- List of earthquakes in 1995
- List of earthquakes in Myanmar
- List of earthquakes in China
- List of earthquakes in Yunnan
