= 1913 Eshan earthquake =

Earthquake in Yunnan, China

- Location within Yunnan
- UTC time: 1913-12-21 15:37:56
- ISC event
- USGS-ANSS: ComCat
- Local date: 21 December 1913
- Magnitude: M_{w} 6.8
- Depth: 15 km (9 mi)
- Epicenter: 24.264°N 102.827°E
- Type: Strike-slip
- Areas affected: Yunnan, China
- Max. intensity: MMI IX (Violent)
- Casualties: 942–1,900 fatalities

The 1913 Eshan earthquake struck China's Yunnan Province on 21 December with a moment magnitude of 6.8 and maximum Mercalli intensity of IX (Violent). The shock devastated Eshan County; at least 942 people died and thousands of homes were destroyed. The earthquake ruptured along a section of the strike-slip Qujiang Fault.

== Tectonic setting ==
Major earthquakes in eastern Yunnan and the border with Sichuan are associated with the north–south striking Xiaojiang Fault; the west–northwest striking Zemuhe Fault to its north; and the northwest trending Qujiang–Shiping Fault. Some of these faults, including the Red River Fault, represent the boundaries of tectonic blocks within both provinces. The Qujiang–Shiping Fault comprises two fault segments (north and south) with a total length of 120 km (75 mi) that strikes northwest to west–northwest and eventually east–west at its southern part. Its slip mechanism comprises right-lateral strike-slip with a notable thrust component. The region is one of the most seismically active zone in Yunnan.

== Earthquake ==
The Qujiang Fault runs northeast and parallel to the much longer Red River Fault, striking northwest–west-northwest. Three ≥M7.0 earthquakes, including the 1913 earthquake, occurred on this fault in 1599 and 1970. The 1970 earthquake measuring M_{s} 7.7 caused a 60 km (37 mi) surface rupture. The northwestern Qujiang Fault ruptured during the 1913 earthquake while its southeastern portion was associated with the earthquake in 1970.

== Impact ==
More than 18,000 homes were destroyed and the earthquake affected a 3,000 km^{2} (1,200 sq mi) area. When the earthquake struck, the region was experiencing heavy snowfall which caused many survivors to die from freezing and starvation. A plague further added to the suffering on top of the lack of food and clothes. Looting was also taking place. In Eshan County, at least 942 people died while the death toll may be as high as 1,900. Another 112 people were also injured. Eighty to ninety percent of residential homes were demolished; all schools, temples and government buildings were also destroyed. Many bridges and city walls were also razed. On agricultural land, large cracks opened, erupting sand and water. Many people reportedly fall into these cracks. In Tonghai, several structures collapsed. Nine people died and 1,000 homes were destroyed in villages. One person died in Hexi; an 8 m (26 ft) section of parapet collapsed; many homes and government buildings also toppled. Sixteen people died in Yuxi; old houses in the county were also destroyed. In Xinping, the room of a government office collapsed and killed three. Landslides affected a 2,839 km^{2} (1,096 sq mi) area.

== See also ==
- List of earthquakes in 1913
- List of earthquakes in China
- List of earthquakes in Yunnan
