= 1976 Longling earthquake =

1976 earthquake sequence in the Yunnan-Myanmar border region

- Location within China
- UTC time: 1976-05-29 12:23:20
- 1976-05-29 14:00:22
- ISC event: 714808
- 714811
- USGS-ANSS: ComCat
- ComCat
- Local date: 29 May 1976
- Local time: 20:23:20
- 22:00:22
- Magnitude: 6.7 M_{w}, 7.0 M_{s}
- 6.6 M_{w}, 6.9 M_{s}
- Epicenter: 24.49°N 98.96°E; 24.54°N 98.72°E
- Areas affected: Longling County, Yunnan
- Max. intensity: MMI X (Extreme)
- Landslides: yes
- Casualties: 98 fatalities, 2,442 injuries

The 1976 Longling earthquake in Yunnan Province, People's Republic of China, was a doublet earthquake, with two main shocks striking just east of Longling at 12:23:20 and 14:00:22 UTC (20:23 and 22:00 local time). The magnitudes were estimated at 6.7 and 6.6, respectively, on the M_{w}^{(GCMT)} scale, and 6.9 and 7.0 on the M_{s} scale; Chinese sources put these at 7.4 and 7.3 on the M_{s7} scale. The region is noted for the quantity and intensity of its earthquakes, and the complexity of its tectonics, which are closely related to the collision between the Indian and Eurasian tectonic plates.

No one died in the Longling county town. Loss in the 9 counties in Baoshan, Lincang and Dehong were 98 deaths, 451 severe injuries and 1,991 light injuries. 420,000 buildings collapsed in an area of 1883 square kilometers.

== Geology ==
Yunnan is a mountainous region lying east of Tibet, and north of the Red River Fault that strikes southeast along the Red River into North Vietnam and the South China Sea. The Red River fault is deep – some believe it may reach the lithosphere – and forms a major tectonic boundary that separates Indochina from the South China block.

The seismotectonics of Yunnan and the adjacent areas is driven by the collision of the Indian plate with the Eurasian plate. This has uplifted the Tibetan Plateau (and the Himalaya Mountains) and forced it eastwards, pushing the South China Block and Indochina towards the westward subducting Philippine Sea plate and creating various extensional structures. All of this has created a complicated geological structure with many faults, which in western Yunnan has allowed heat and fluids from the subducting Indian plate to rise into the upper crust, creating the Tengchong volcanic field to the north of Longling and the Longling fault (location of the first event), and west of the Nu River and Nu River fault (location of the second event). It appears that igneous intrusions have weakened the bedrock in this area, which has led to uneven accumulations of stress, which caused the earthquake.

== See also ==
- 1976 Songpan–Pingwu earthquake (August 16–23)
- 1976 Tangshan earthquake (July 28)
- 1988 Lancang–Gengma earthquakes
- List of earthquakes in 1976
- List of earthquakes in China
- List of earthquakes in Yunnan

== Sources ==
- ANSS, "Yunnan 1976a: M 6.9 – Myanmar-China border region", Comprehensive Catalog, U.S. Geological Survey
- ANSS, "Yunnan 1976b: M 7.0 – Myanmar-China border region", Comprehensive Catalog, U.S. Geological Survey
- International Seismological Centre, ISC-EHB Bulletin, Thatcham, United Kingdom
- Kusky, Timothy M.; Windley, B. F.; Zhai, M.-G. (2007), Zhai, M.-G.; Windley, B. F.; Kusky, T. M.; Meng, Q. R. (eds.), "Tectonic evolution of the North China Block: from orogen to craton to orogen" (PDF), Mesozoic Sub-Continental Lithospheric Thinning Under Eastern Asia, Special Publications 280, vol. 280, no. 1, Geological Society, pp. 1–34, Bibcode:2007GSLSP.280....1K, doi:10.1144/SP280.1, S2CID 129902429.
- Lei, Jianshe; Zhao, Dapeng; Su, Youjin (2009), "Insight into the origin of the Tengchong intraplate volcano and seismotectonics in southwest China from local and teleseismic data" (PDF), Journal of Geophysical Research, 114 (B05302): B05302, Bibcode:2009JGRB..114.5302L, doi:10.1029/2008JB005881.
- "Short-term prediction of the 7.2-magnitude earthquake of Songpan and Pingwu in Sichuan Province in 1976", Sichuan Earthquake Administration, archived from the original on 2018-10-14.
- Wang, Chun-Yong; Chan, W. Winston; Mooney, Walter D. (2003), "Three-dimensional velocity structure of crust and upper mantle in southwestern China and its tectonic implications" (PDF), Journal of Geophysical Research, 108 (B9): 2442, Bibcode:2003JGRB..108.2442W, doi:10.1029/2002JB001973.
- Wang, Jin-nan; Wang, Yang-long; An, Xiao-wen; Yang, Xiang-dong; Chang, Zu-feng (2006), "Activity of the faults in the 1976 Longling M 7.3, 7.4 earthquake area", Journal of Seismological Research, 29: 366–372, archived from the original on 2018-10-11 (in Chinese with English abstract).
- Xu, Yi; Yang, Xiatao; Li, Zhiwei; Liu, Jianhua (20 June 2012), "Seismic structure of the Tengchong volcanic area southwest China from local earthquake tomography", Journal of Volcanology and Geothermal Research, 239–240: 83–91, Bibcode:2012JVGR..239...83X, doi:10.1016/j.jvolgeores.2012.06.017, S2CID 34644263.
- Chorography Codification Committee of Yunnan; Yunnan Earthquake Administration (1999). 云南省志·卷三 地震志 [Annals of Yunnan, Volume 3, Earthquake] (in Chinese). Kunming: Yunnan People's Publishing House. ISBN 7-222-02829-3.
