= Tuogu Mosque =

Mosque in Ludian, Yunnan, China

- 拖姑清真寺
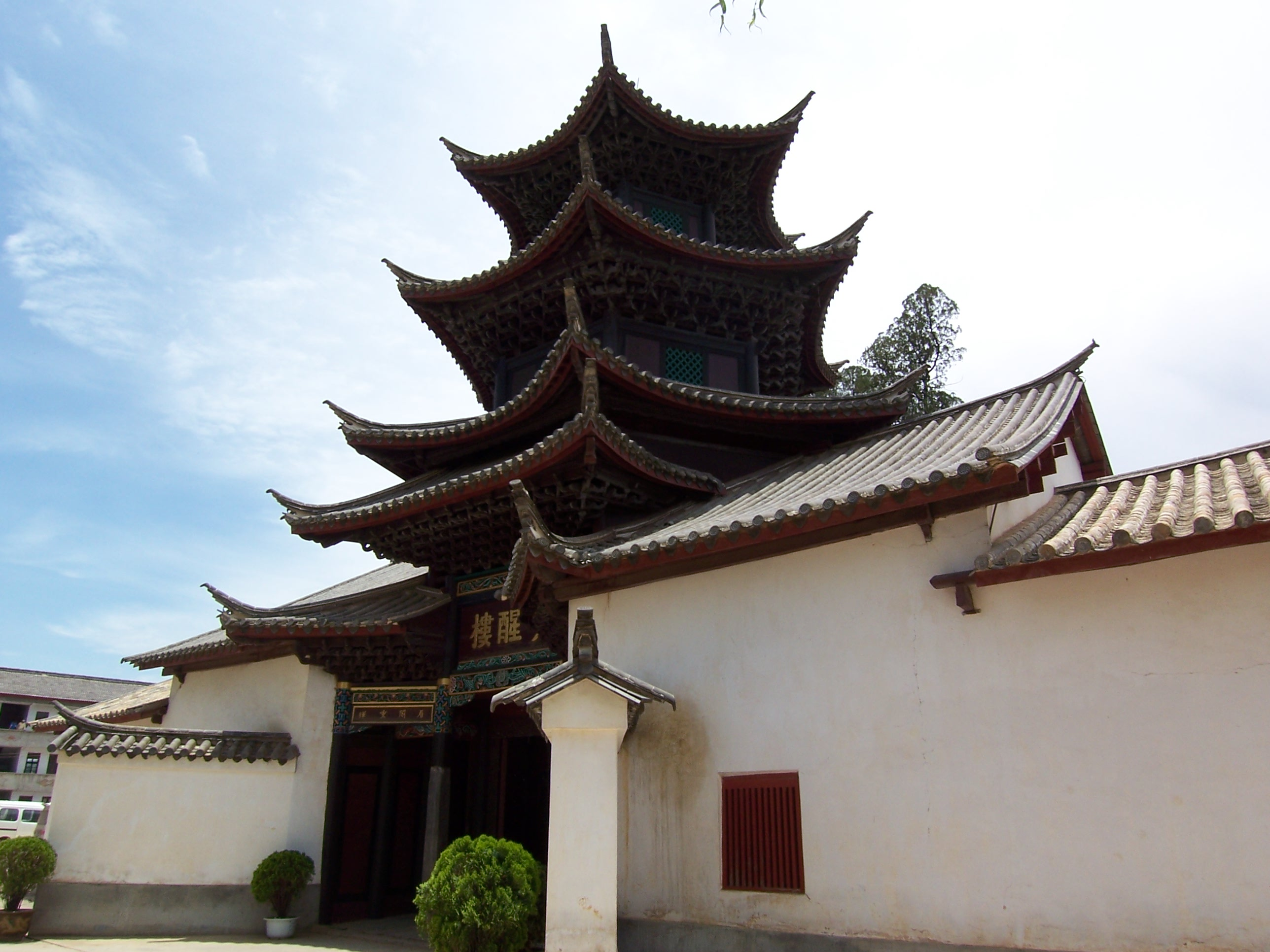

- Location of the mosque in Yunnan

Religion
- Affiliation: Sunni Islam
- Ecclesiastical or organisational status: Mosque
- Leadership: Hai Benjiang (海本江)
- Status: Active

Location
- Location: Taoyuan Hui Ethnic Township, Ludian County, Yunnan
- Country: China
- Interactive map of Tuogu Mosque
- Coordinates: 27°10′41″N 103°36′48″E

Architecture
- Type: Mosque
- Style: Chinese
- Founder: Ma Lincan, Ma Linchi
- Completed: 1730

Chinese name
- Chinese: 拖姑清真寺
Transcriptions
Standard Mandarin
- Hanyu Pinyin: Tuōgū Qīngzhēn Sì

The Tuogu Mosque (Chinese: 拖姑清真寺; pinyin: Tuōgū Qīngzhēn Sì) is a mosque located in Taoyuan Hui Ethnic Township, Ludian County, in the Yunnan province of China. It is a provincial level cultural heritage in Yunnan.

== Name ==
The word Tuogu is a transliteration in Yi language, it means "a beautiful place".

== Overview ==
The Tuogu Mosque was built by the donation of Qing dynasty military officers Ma Lincan (马麟灿) and Ma Linchi (马麟炽) in 1730.

The mosque covers 4,000 square metres (43,000 sq ft). The extant structure is based on the Qing dynasty building principles and retains the traditional architectural style. The extant buildings include the main hall, tower of Huanxing (唤醒楼), hall of Wujuan (无倦堂), back pavilion (后亭), and Zhaobi (照壁).

The main hall is 15 metres (49 ft) wide, 18 metres (59 ft) deep and 13 metres (43 ft) high. The hall is supported by 36 columns. There is a plaque under the eaves: 快乐天堂 ("Happy Paradise").

The tower of Huanxing is a Chinese tower with five stories. There is a plaque under the eaves in the center hall: 普慈万有 ("Puci Wanyou")

== See also ==
- Islam in China
- List of mosques in China
