= Chongxi =

Chongxi may refer to:

- Chongxi (1032–1055), reign period of Emperor Xingzong of Liao
- Chongxi, Yunnan, a town in Qiaojia County, Yunnan, China
- Chongxi Pagoda, in Zhaoqing, Guangdong, China
