= 1925 Dali earthquake =

Violent earthquake in Yunnan Province, China

- Location within Yunnan
- UTC time: 1925-03-16 14:42:17
- ISC event: 910412
- USGS-ANSS: ComCat
- Local date: 16 March 1925
- Local time: 22:42
- Magnitude: 7.0 M_{s}^{(NGDC)} 6.9 M_{s}^{(ISC-GEM)}
- Depth: 26 km (16 mi)
- Epicenter: 25.7°N 100.4°E
- Areas affected: Yunnan, Republic of China
- Max. intensity: MMI IX (Violent)
- Casualties: 5,000 dead

The 1925 Dali earthquake occurred at 14:42 UTC on 16 March. It had an estimated magnitude of 7.0 on the surface-wave magnitude scale and a maximum perceived intensity of at least IX (Violent) on the Mercalli intensity scale. It had an epicenter in the province of Yunnan in southern China and killed an estimated 5,000 people.

== Tectonic setting ==
Yunnan lies in a tectonically complex zone affected by the broad zone of deformation associated with the ongoing collision between the Indian plate and the Eurasian plate. A rhomb-shaped fault-bounded block, known as the Sichuan-Yunnan Block, is recognised that is bounded by the active left-lateral strike-slip faults of the Xianshuihe fault system and the currently right lateral Red River Fault and Jinshajiang Fault.

== Earthquake ==
The earthquake was caused by movement on the northwestern part of the Red River Fault.

The area affected by shaking of at least intensity VII was nearly 5,000 square kilometres.

== Damage ==
The city of Dali was severely damaged. 76,000 homes were destroyed either by the shaking or subsequent fires. The city walls were badly affected, locally collapsing completely, with battlements devastated and two of the gate towers destroyed. 3,600 people were killed in the city, with a further 7,200 injured. 5,000 livestock were also killed. In Fengyi, thousands of houses were destroyed and over 1,200 people died, with a further 550 injured. In Midu County, 159 people died and 165 were injured. In Binchuan County, over 800 people died and more than 500 were injured. There were also deaths in Dengchuan, Xiangyun and Weishan.

== See also ==
- List of earthquakes in 1925
- List of earthquakes in China
- List of earthquakes in Yunnan
- 2021 Dali earthquake
