= 2007 Yunnan earthquake =

Earthquake in Yunnan, China

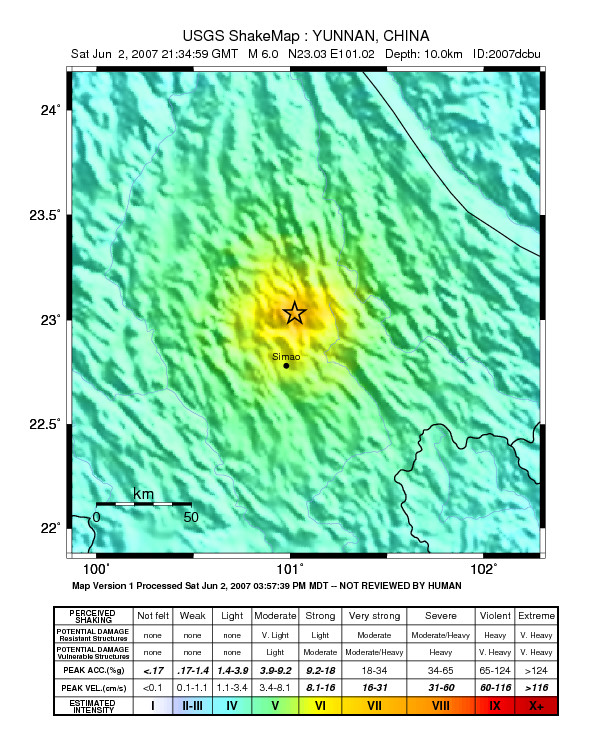
- USGS ShakeMap
- UTC time: 2007-06-02 21:34:57
- ISC event: 12670637
- USGS-ANSS: ComCat
- Local date: 3 June 2007
- Local time: 5:34 a.m. CST
- Duration: 14 seconds
- Magnitude: M_{wb} 6.1
- Depth: 5.0 kilometres (3.1 mi)
- Epicenter: 23°01′40.8″N 101°03′07.2″E
- Fault: Wuliangshan
- Type: Strike-slip
- Areas affected: Ning'er, Yunnan, China
- Total damage: CN¥ 2.5 billion (US$310 million)
- Max. intensity: MMI VIII (Severe)
- Tsunami: No
- Landslides: Yes
- Aftershocks: 1,422
- Casualties: 3 fatalities, 562 injuries

On 3 June 2007 at around 5:34 a.m. CST, a M_{wb} 6.1 earthquake struck Ning'er in Yunnan, China. The epicenter was located 119 kilometres (74 mi) from the city of Jinghong. Three people were killed and 562 others were injured. More than 90,000 homes collapsed while 270,000 more sustained damage. The earthquake is among the strongest to ever strike the county.

== Earthquake ==
The earthquake struck about 119 kilometres (74 mi) NNE of Jinghong. According to the United States Geological Survey (USGS), the earthquake was measured at M_{wb} 6.1 with a depth of 5.0 kilometres (3.1 mi), while the China Earthquake Administration (CEA) measured the magnitude as 6.4. The shaking duration was about 14 seconds. An estimated 2,542,898 people felt MMI VIII (Severe) shaking in Pu'er City, with shaking being felt as far away as Lancang Lahu Autonomous County. Experts closely monitored the situation. The earthquake received coverage as far as the United States.

=== Aftershocks ===
The Ning'er County Earthquake Bureau recorded at least 1,778 aftershocks, some causing widespread damage and multiple injuries.

== Impact ==
Three people were killed and at least 562 others were injured. Among the dead was a 4-year-old boy who was killed when his house collapsed. His mother was rescued. At least 30 people suffered serious injuries in Ning'er County. More than 90,000 homes collapsed and over 270,000 more damaged. 447 roads sustained severe damage. Pipes were also damaged, cutting off water supplies, and though electricity was still on in some areas, shops and schools were closed. No fires were reported. 1 million people were affected by the earthquake, with around 180,000 evacuations being carried out. Tens of thousands of Ning'er residents were forced to sleep in the open during hot temperatures.

== Responses ==
The provincial civil affairs department sent 2,000 tents, 2,000 quilts and 2,000 items of clothes to Ning'er. The Ministry of Civil Affairs sent a working group to the area and allotted 5,000 tents from Guangxi. The Red Cross Society of China and its Yunnan branch sent a batch of relief supplies worth 500,000 yuan (65,000 U.S. dollars), including tents, quilts, food and medicines. Habitat For Humanity assisted 50 families to rebuild their homes. Rescue officials from the China Earthquake Administration were dispatched to help local search and rescue efforts. Premier Wen Jiabao visited the affected residents.

== See also ==
- List of earthquakes in 2007
- List of earthquakes in China
- List of earthquakes in Yunnan
