= Tengchong volcanic field =

Volcanic field in Yunnan, China

Tengchong Volcanic Field
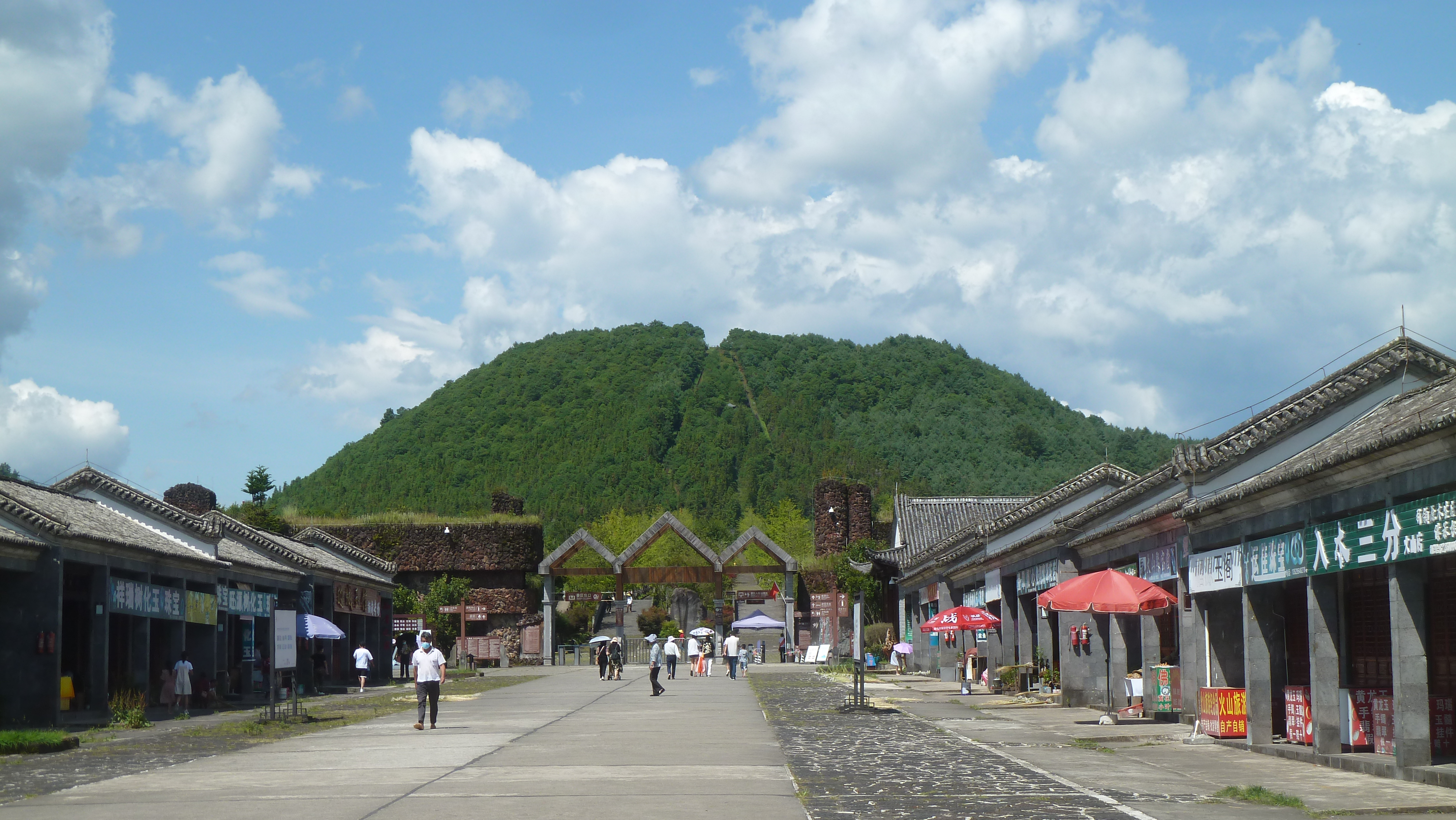
- Path leading to entrance of Volcano Scenic Area of Tengchong Volcanic Geothermal National Geological Park, Yunnan, China.

Highest point
- Elevation: 2,865 m (9,400 ft)
- Coordinates: 25°23′53″N 98°29′30″E

Naming
- Native name: 腾冲火山带 (Chinese)

Geography
- Location within Yunnan
- Location: Baoshan, Yunnan, China

Geology
- Last eruption: 5750 BCE

The Tengchong Volcanic Field (TVF) is a Cenozoic volcanic field located in the southeastern margin of the Tibetan Plateau around 40 km from the Chinese border with Myanmar. The TVF is uniquely the only region affected by Quaternary volcanism that is part of the Himalayan Geothermal Belt caused by the Indo-Asian continent-continent collision. The TVF is characterized by hydrothermal activity and large-scale eruptions last recorded in 1609 CE. Although the volcanoes themselves are considered extinct, several geothermal fields geographically linked to the TVF are still highly active. Evidence for geothermal activity can be linked to several prevalent active hot springs located predominantly within the vicinity of the volcanoes in the TVF.

Holocene eruptions occurred predominantly in the three largest volcanoes in the TVF, named the Dayingshan, Ma'anshan and Heikongshan, the highest of which (Dayingshan) reaches 2865 meters above sea level. The volcanoes are distributed in a string-like pattern clustered from north to south in the middle on the Tengchong basin and are characterized by post-collisional high-potassium calc-alkaline series eruptions. The TVF provides unique geographical and geological knowledge, as understanding the geological processes of its creation provides insight into aspects such as the history of volcanism during the Quaternary Era in the region and as well as compositional information of its source and crustal assimilates.

The TVF can be visited in the Tengchong Volcanic Geothermal National Geological Park.`

== Geology ==
=== General overview and history ===
The volcanic field is located geographically in China but geologically is more closely related to Southeast Asia's volcano zones. The TVF is a product of one of the most important events that transpired in the Cenozoic Era, the Indo-Asian continent-continent collision, which occurred c. 59 Ma. The result of the collision was the uplift of the Tibetan Plateau along with Asian continent acidification (the release of CO_{2} due to volcanic activity), global climate change, tectonism, and volcanic activity associated with the TVF. Prior to this continent collision during the Paleozoic, the Tengchong block was located along the Indian margin of the supercontinent Gondwana. High-resolution tomographic data revealed evidence for an eastward underthrusting of the Indian continental lithosphere into the asthenospheric mantle underneath the TVF. This indicates that, prior to the continent collision, the Tengchong block along with the West Burma block overlaid the subducted Neo-Tethyan oceanic lithosphere.

There are a total of 68 volcanoes, all of which are pyroclastic cones, and around 25 of these still bear recognizable craters and cones. In addition to the volcanoes, there are 58 hot springs in the TVF, all derived from the Quaternary Era. The volcanoes in the TVF are typically concentrated in clusters along a string-like north-south pattern. Of the 68 volcanoes, there are three that are still considered active today based on their measured geothermal activity. These volcanoes are Maanshan (Saddle Peak), Heikonshan (Black Emptied Peak), and Dayinshan; Dayingshan is the oldest of the three and last erupted in 1609 CE, documented by Chinese geographer Xu Xiake (1587–1641). The crust averages 40 kilometres (25 mi) thick in the TVF, whereas to the north and south, the crust is measured to be on average 55 to 60 kilometres (34 to 37 mi) thick. The lithosphere-asthenosphere boundary is roughly 80 kilometres (50 mi) deep in the TVF and 100 to 120 kilometres (62 to 75 mi) deep in the surrounding regions.

=== Petrology and petrogenesis ===
The TVF is predominantly composed of volcanic rocks that follow a high-potassium calc-alkaline (HKCA) suite formed by post-collisional continent subduction of the Indian slab and regional extension. The rocks found in this region are basalt, dacite, welded tuff, basaltic trachyandesite, and trachyandesite. These rocks were extruded out as lava flows and pyroclastic material. The origin of the rocks present in the TVF can be categorized into three eruption stages, deduced by K-Ar dating:

1. basalt and olivine basalt forming during the late Miocene to Pliocene (5.5–4.0 Ma and 3.8–0.9 Ma),
2. acid rocks (silicic igneous rocks) forming in the Pleistocene (0.8–0.1 Ma), and
3. basalt and intermediate-acid rocks form during the late Pleistocene to Holocene (0.1–0.01 Ma).

The largest rock distribution in the TVF is characterized by the rocks formed during the Pleistocene (2), indicating that volcanic activity was greatest during this phase.

Andesitic lavas comprise the most recent volcanic rocks. The basement rocks are dominantly composed of Precambrian metamorphic rocks underlain by sedimentary and igneous rocks including limestones, sandstones, mudstones, and granitoids followed by volcanic-sedimentary sequences. As eruptions progressed with time, the MgO content in the volcanic rocks decreases, whereas the K_{2}O content increases. Chemical variations in HKCA suite exist due to derived petrological variations in the rocks. This includes partial melting of an enriched primitive-mantle-derived magma source by subducted clay-rich sediments, which formed the trachybasalts (volcanic rock with a composition between trachyte and basalt). This was followed by mantle-derived magmas forming the trachyandesites and basaltic trachyandesites originating from the lower crust through assimilation-fractional crystallization (a process by which magma crystallizes with the addition of crustal material inside the magma chamber or conduit).

=== Structure ===
The TVF is located near the intersection of several faults and thrusts. It rests on the Tengchong block, which is simply an extension of the southern Tibetan Plateau. The Tengchong block is bounded by the Sagaing Shear Zone and the Tsangpo Suture to the west, the north–south-trending strike-slip Jinsha-Red River Fault and the dextral strike-slip Gaoligong shear zone to the East, and the Ruili fault to the southeast. Within the TVF, the India-Asian continent collision created a fault system that consists of predominantly north–south-trending strike-slip faults. The strike-slip fault system within the nuclei of the Tengchong block includes the major faults such as the Longchuanjinang Fault, the Binlanghinag Fault and Dayingjiang Fault.

=== Current geothermal activity ===
The Rehai Geothermal Field (RGF) is the largest and most active geothermal field in the TVF. A low-velocity zone indicated by seismic surveys and a highly conductive body recorded by magnetic surveys underlie recent volcanoes located in the RGF, providing evidence of an active crustal magma chamber. In addition, the seismic data indicates that the magma chamber beneath the TVF is unstable, which indicates a potential risk for future eruptions. Present-day hydrothermal activity best characterized by the hot springs in the TVF are fueled by heat generated from below the RGF.

== Magma-derived CO_{2} emissions ==
The TVF is a contributor to global climate change. Emissions of CO_{2} have been calculated to be around 4.48×10^{6} t/y to 7.05×10^{6} t/y of total flux outgassing. These emissions have a measurable role in global climate change because of two main counter-acting reasons. The uplift of the TVF sequesters carbon because soil production is faster atop mountain ranges, and soil removes carbon dioxide from the atmosphere by trapping atmospheric carbon dioxide in limestone. However, in contrast, syn-collisional volcanism, post-collisional volcanism, subduction-zone metamorphism, and present-day hydrothermal activity in the TVF results in augmented levels of global carbon by releasing it as atmospheric carbon dioxide.

== Eruptions ==
=== 13642 BP ===
An eruption occurred at the end of the Late Pleistocene that has been dated to 13642±84 cal yr BP, or around 11692 BC.

=== 5750 BCE ===
This was the last confirmed large-scale eruption of the Tengchong volcanic field. It produced basaltic and andesitic lavas.

=== 1609 CE ===
A possible explosive eruption may have occurred at this time as well as an earthquake swarm, though reports are few and uncertain.

== Tengchong Volcanic Geothermal National Geological Park ==
The Tengchong Volcanic Geothermal National Geological Park (Chinese: 腾冲地热火山国家公园; pinyin: Téngchōng dìrè huǒshān guójiā gōngyuán) is a national park in China that features the Tengchong volcanic field and several of its other features. The park's main entrance is at the base of the three largest extinct volcanic cones (which are in close proximity with each other). The volcanoes are covered in vegetation and visitors can take hiking trails up to their summits. There is also a geologic museum near the main entrance. Another volcanic feature, the Rehai geothermal field, is the central tourist attraction of the park. It features hot springs, fumaroles, geysers, and extensive limestone terraces as well as hiking paths with views of the features.

== See also ==
- List of volcanoes in China
