= Qiaojia County =

Coordinates: 26°55′12″N 102°55′48″E

Qiaojia County 巧家县
- County
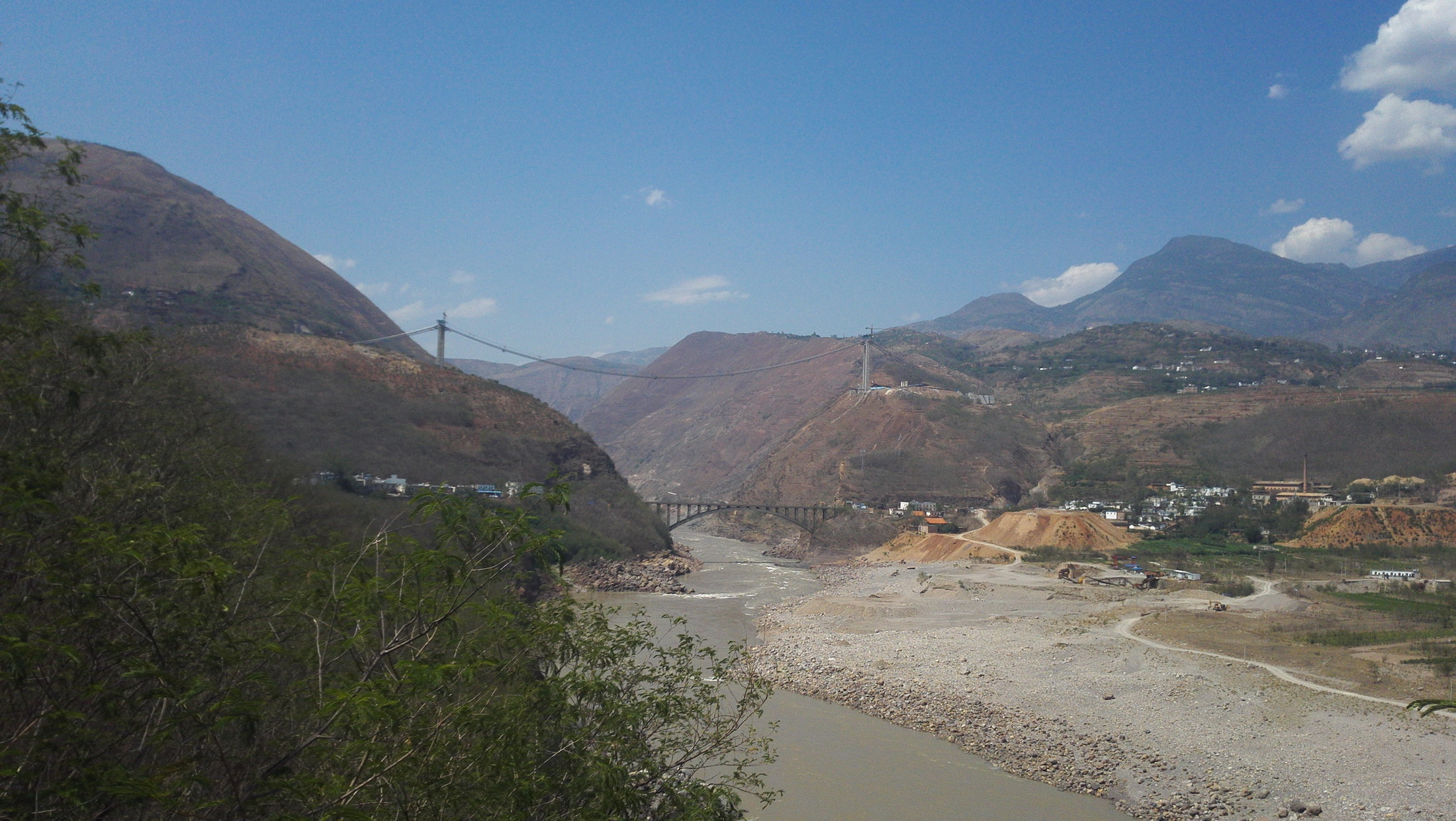

- Location of Qiaojia County (red) and Zhaotong Prefecture (pink) within Yunnan province of China
- Country: People's Republic of China
- Province: Yunnan
- Prefecture-level city: Zhaotong

Area
  - County: 3,245 km^{2} (1,253 sq mi)
- Elevation: 900 m (3,000 ft)
- Highest elevation (Dianyaoshan): 4,041.6 m (13,260 ft)
- Lowest elevation (Xiluodu reservoir): 600 m (2,000 ft)

Population (2019)
  - County: 625,000
  - Density: 193/km^{2} (499/sq mi)
  - Urban: 175,700
- Time zone: UTC+8 (CST)
- Postal code: 654600
- Area code: 0870
- Website: www.qiaojia.gov.cn

Qiaojia County (Chinese: 巧家县; pinyin: Qiǎojiā Xiàn) is a county in the northeast of Yunnan province, China, bordering Sichuan province to the north and west. The population was 625,000 in 2019, 33,200 of whom belonged to ethnic minorities. It is both the southernmost and westernmost county-level division of Zhaotong City and located entirely on the right bank of the Jinsha River. The river valleys of Qiaojia are some of the lowest points in Yunnan province, at around 900 meters. The name of the county literally means 'City of industrious artisans'.

The county is noted for being the site of the Baihetan Dam, located 40 km from the county seat. Construction of the dam required resettlement of 44,919 Qiaojia residents.

Qiaojia is located at the junction of several geological faults. It was hit by a magnitude 5.0 earthquake in 2020, and also affected by the 2014 Ludian earthquake.

== Geography ==
Qiaojia County is located in the northeast of Yunnan and in the southwest of Zhaotong. It borders Huize County to the east, Dongchuan District to the south, Huidong County and Ningnan County of Sichuan to the west, Butuo County and Jinyang County of Sichuan to the north, and Ludian County and Zhaoyang District across the Niulan River to the northeast.

== Administrative divisions ==
The county government is seated in Baihetan town. Qiaojia is subdivided into the town and township level divisions:

12 towns

- Baihetan (白鹤滩镇)
- Yaoshan (药山镇)
- Dazhai (大寨镇)
- Maozu (茂租镇)
- Dongping (东坪镇)
- Xiaohe (小河镇)
- Xindian (新店镇)
- Laodian (老店镇)
- Mashu (马树镇)
- Chongxi (崇溪镇)
- Menggu (蒙姑镇)
- Jintang (金塘镇)

4 townships

- Hongshan (红山乡)
- Baogunao (包谷垴乡)
- Zhongzhai (中寨乡)
- Lufang (巧家县)

== Climate ==
Climate data for Qiaojia, elevation 894 m (2,933 ft), (1991–2020 normals, extremes 1981–2010)
Month	Jan	Feb	Mar	Apr	May	Jun	Jul	Aug	Sep	Oct	Nov	Dec	Year
Record high °C (°F)	30.4 (86.7)	33.7 (92.7)	38.6 (101.5)	40.8 (105.4)	44.7 (112.5)	42.5 (108.5)	40.7 (105.3)	39.4 (102.9)	39.1 (102.4)	36.1 (97.0)	34.6 (94.3)	31.3 (88.3)	44.7 (112.5)
Mean daily maximum °C (°F)	19.2 (66.6)	23.2 (73.8)	28.3 (82.9)	31.8 (89.2)	32.8 (91.0)	31.8 (89.2)	32.0 (89.6)	32.2 (90.0)	28.9 (84.0)	25.2 (77.4)	23.3 (73.9)	19.1 (66.4)	27.3 (81.2)
Daily mean °C (°F)	12.6 (54.7)	16.3 (61.3)	20.8 (69.4)	24.6 (76.3)	26.2 (79.2)	26.1 (79.0)	26.6 (79.9)	26.4 (79.5)	23.7 (74.7)	20.2 (68.4)	17.2 (63.0)	13.1 (55.6)	21.2 (70.1)
Mean daily minimum °C (°F)	8.3 (46.9)	11.3 (52.3)	15.4 (59.7)	19.3 (66.7)	21.4 (70.5)	22.2 (72.0)	23.0 (73.4)	22.7 (72.9)	20.3 (68.5)	17.0 (62.6)	13.2 (55.8)	9.3 (48.7)	17.0 (62.5)
Record low °C (°F)	−0.3 (31.5)	0.1 (32.2)	4.2 (39.6)	7.8 (46.0)	9.4 (48.9)	14.5 (58.1)	17.3 (63.1)	16.6 (61.9)	11.9 (53.4)	8.3 (46.9)	3.4 (38.1)	0.1 (32.2)	−0.3 (31.5)
Average precipitation mm (inches)	14.2 (0.56)	11.4 (0.45)	17.9 (0.70)	23.8 (0.94)	68.2 (2.69)	192.7 (7.59)	164.1 (6.46)	123.6 (4.87)	123.6 (4.87)	88.3 (3.48)	19.3 (0.76)	5.7 (0.22)	852.8 (33.59)
Average precipitation days (≥ 0.1 mm)	3.4	3.3	4.6	6.5	10.7	16.7	17.2	14.4	14.2	12.9	4.9	2.7	111.5
Average snowy days	0.6	0.3	0	0	0	0	0	0	0	0	0	0.2	1.1
Average relative humidity (%)	51	43	39	41	50	68	73	71	74	72	62	57	58
Mean monthly sunshine hours	198.8	199.4	229.5	230.7	199.6	131.4	137.8	154.0	115.2	125.7	176.0	181.5	2,079.6
Percentage possible sunshine	60	63	61	60	48	32	33	38	32	36	55	56	48
Source: China Meteorological Administration

== See also ==
- Qiaojia Pine
- Baihetan Dam
