= 1833 Kunming earthquake =

Magnitude 8 earthquake that struck Kunming in Yunnan, China on September 6, 1833

- Location within Yunnan
- Local date: September 6, 1833
- Magnitude: 8.0 M_{w}
- Epicenter: 25°24′N 103°00′E
- Fault: Xiaojiang Fault
- Areas affected: Kunming, China
- Casualties: 6,000 dead and 80,000 displaced

The 1833 Kunming earthquake was an 8.0 M_{w} earthquake that struck the provincial capital Kunming in Yunnan, China on September 6, 1833. The earthquake had its epicenter along the Xiaojiang Fault near the town of Songming, approximately 50 km (31 mi) northeast of Kunming's city centre. The earthquake destroyed mosques, homes and other buildings in Kunming and the nearby countryside. More than 6,000 people died as a result of the earthquake and another 80,000 were displaced. The local governor at the time provided relief to the region and used the event to strengthen his administration in the province. The 1833 Kunming earthquake was the largest magnitude earthquake in Yunnan's recorded history.

== See also ==
- List of earthquakes in Yunnan
- List of earthquakes in China
