= Chongxi, Yunnan =

Chongxi 崇溪镇
- Town
- Location in Yunnan
- Coordinates: 26°51′36″N 103°7′50″E
- Country: People's Republic of China
- Province: Yunnan
- Prefecture-level city: Zhaotong
- County: Qiaojia County
- Time zone: UTC+8 (China Standard)

Chongxi (Chinese: 崇溪; pinyin: Chóngxī) is a town under the administration of Qiaojia County, Yunnan, China. As of 2020, it administers Chongxi Residential Community and the following 11 villages:

- Beifeng Village (背风村)
- Yangpeng Village (羊棚村)
- Gangou Village (干沟村)
- Anjuka Village (安居卡村)
- Gonghe Village (共和村)
- Laowu Village (老屋村)
- Mahong Village (马洪村)
- Heyu Village (河玉村)
- Huashan Village (花山村)
- Nantuan Village (南团村)
- Baimu Village (柏木村)
