= 1998 Ninglang earthquake =

Earthquake in China

- Location within China
- UTC time: 1998-11-19 11:38:14
- ISC event: 1324800
- USGS-ANSS: ComCat
- Local date: November 19, 1998
- Local time: 19:38:14 CST
- Magnitude: M_{s} 6.2
- Depth: 10 km (6.2 mi)
- Epicenter: 27.27°N 101.03°E
- Areas affected: China
- Casualties: 5 dead

The 1998 Ninglang earthquake (1998年宁蒗地震) occurred on November 19 at 19:38 local time. The epicenter was near the border between the provinces of Sichuan and Yunnan, China. The United States Geological Survey stated that the epicenter was located in the Sichuan Province, while the China Earthquake Data Center provided a different location in Lanniqing Township (烂泥箐乡), Ninglang, Yunnan Province. The magnitude of the earthquake was put at M_{s} 6.2 and it caused five deaths, with 208 seriously injured in Yunnan and 20 people seriously injured in Sichuan. Building damage was reported in Ninglang, Yunnan and Yanyuan, Sichuan. A dammed lake was formed by a landslide in the Lanniqing Township.

The earthquake occurred around the time of New Year Festival of the Yi people. The lowest temperature in the mountainous area of Ninglang had dropped to about 0 °C at night. Around 30,000 people lived outside. The local government distributed tents and blankets in the earthquake stricken areas. The Japanese government provided 200,000 US dollars.

The focal mechanism was of right-lateral strike-slip faulting in the NNW direction. The earthquake was preceded by prominent foreshocks, the largest of which occurred on October 2 at 12:49 UTC (20:49 local time) with a magnitude of M_{s} 5.3. The aftershocks were distributed in a belt in the NW direction. Underground water anomalies were recorded before the earthquake.
