= 2014 Ludian earthquake =

6.1 magnitude earthquake in Yunnan, China

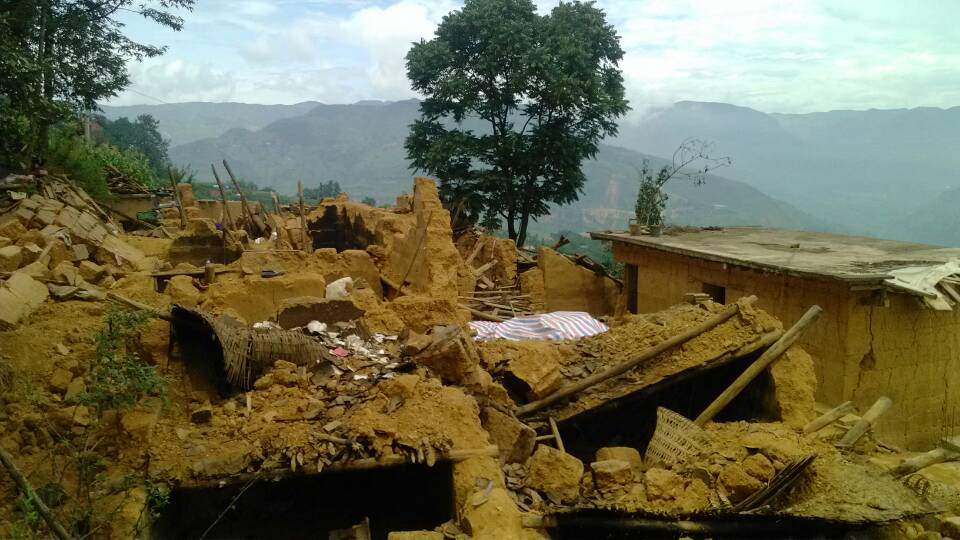
- The town of Zhoujiaping after the earthquake

- Location within Yunnan
- UTC time: 2014-08-03 08:30:13
- ISC event: 605131010
- USGS-ANSS: ComCat
- Local date: 3 August 2014
- Local time: 16:30:13 CST (UTC+8)
- Magnitude: 6.5 M_{L} 6.2 M_{w}
- Depth: 12.0 km (7.5 mi)
- Epicenter: 27.245°N 103.427°E
- Areas affected: Yunnan, China: Ludian County; Huize County; Qiaojia County
- Total damage: $9.91 billion
- Max. intensity: MMI VII (Very strong)
- Casualties: 615 dead, 3,143 injured, 112 missing

The 2014 Ludian earthquake struck Ludian County, Yunnan, China, with a moment magnitude of 6.2 on 3 August. The earthquake killed at least 615 people, injuring at least 2,400 others. At least 114 people remained missing. Over 12,000 houses collapsed and 30,000 were damaged. According to the United States Geological Survey, the earthquake occurred 29 km (18 mi) west-southwest of Zhaotong city at 16:30 local time (08:30 UTC).

== Tectonic setting ==
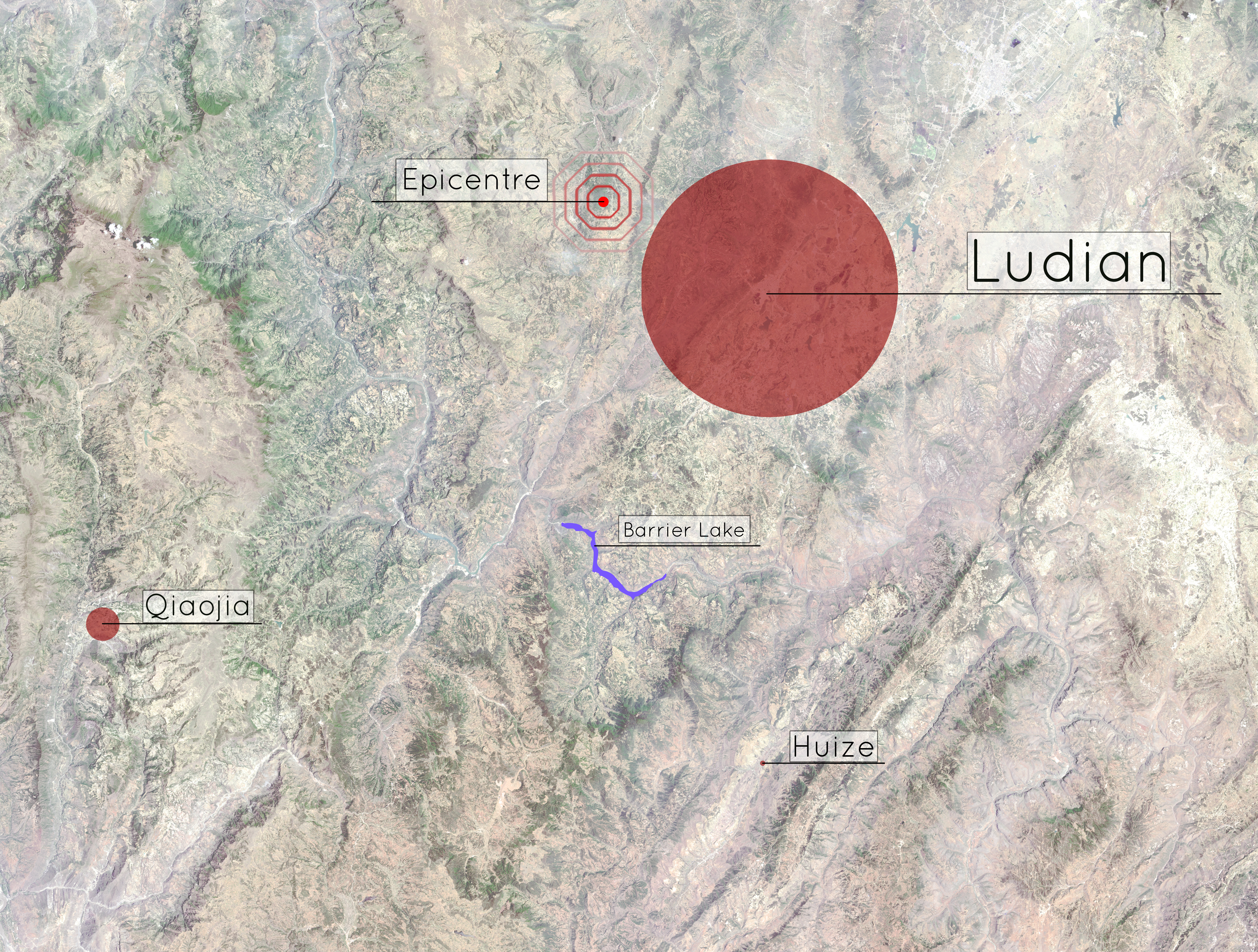
Satellite image of the immediate area affected by the Ludian earthquake. Size of red circles represent number of deceased per county.

The earthquake occurred at 16:30, Beijing time (08:30 UTC), on 3 August 2014. American geological surveys indicated that the epicenter was 29 km (18 mi) WSW of Zhaotong city at a depth of 10.0 km (6.2 mi), in the quake-prone province of Yunnan in southwestern China, about 18 km (11 mi) from Zhaotong. It was especially felt in the province of Yunnan, and less in the provinces of Guizhou and Sichuan.

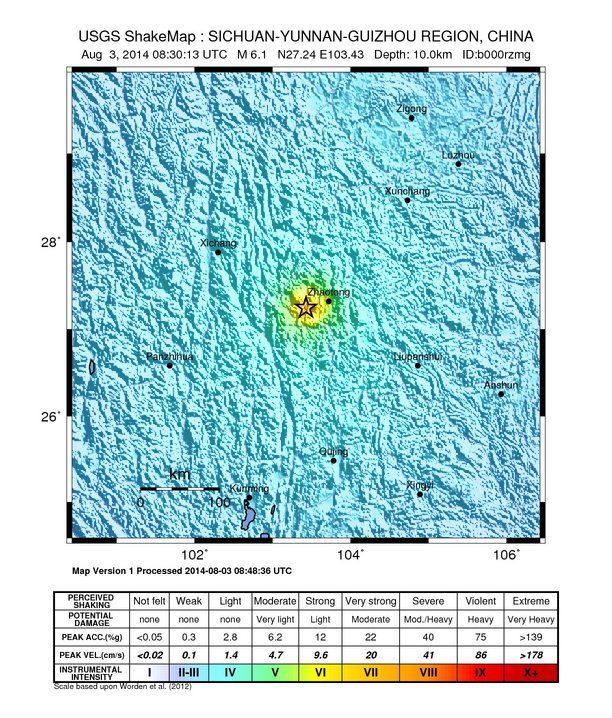
ShakeMap of the earthquake from the United States Geological Survey.

The magnitude of the earthquake was 6.1 on the moment magnitude scale, with an intensity of up to VII (Very strong) on the Mercalli intensity scale. The quake was the result of a strike-slip fault, whose fault plane has a southwest–northeast strike.

Seismicity in this region of southeast Asia is the direct result of the orogenic activity of the Himalayan mountain belt. Due to the complex interaction between the Eurasian plate and Indo-Australian plate from Afghanistan in the west to Burma and China in the east, many shallow sub-surface faults are present in both southwest China and neighbouring Myanmar.

=== Recent earthquakes ===
This particular part of Yunnan Province was struck by the M_{w} 6.3 Burma earthquake in 2003. Similar events have occurred in recent years due to strike-slip faulting in the nearby vicinity, such as the M_{w}7.7 1988 Lancang earthquake, the 2006 Yunnan earthquake of magnitude 5.0, which killed 19 people, the largest of recent times, the M_{w} 7.9 2008 Sichuan earthquake, which killed over 69,000 people, the M_{w} 6.9 2011 Shan earthquake, and more recently, the 2012 Yunnan earthquakes, which was the result of reverse faulting and not strike-slip faulting like the Ludian earthquake, killing 81 people and injuring 821 others.

== Damage and casualties ==
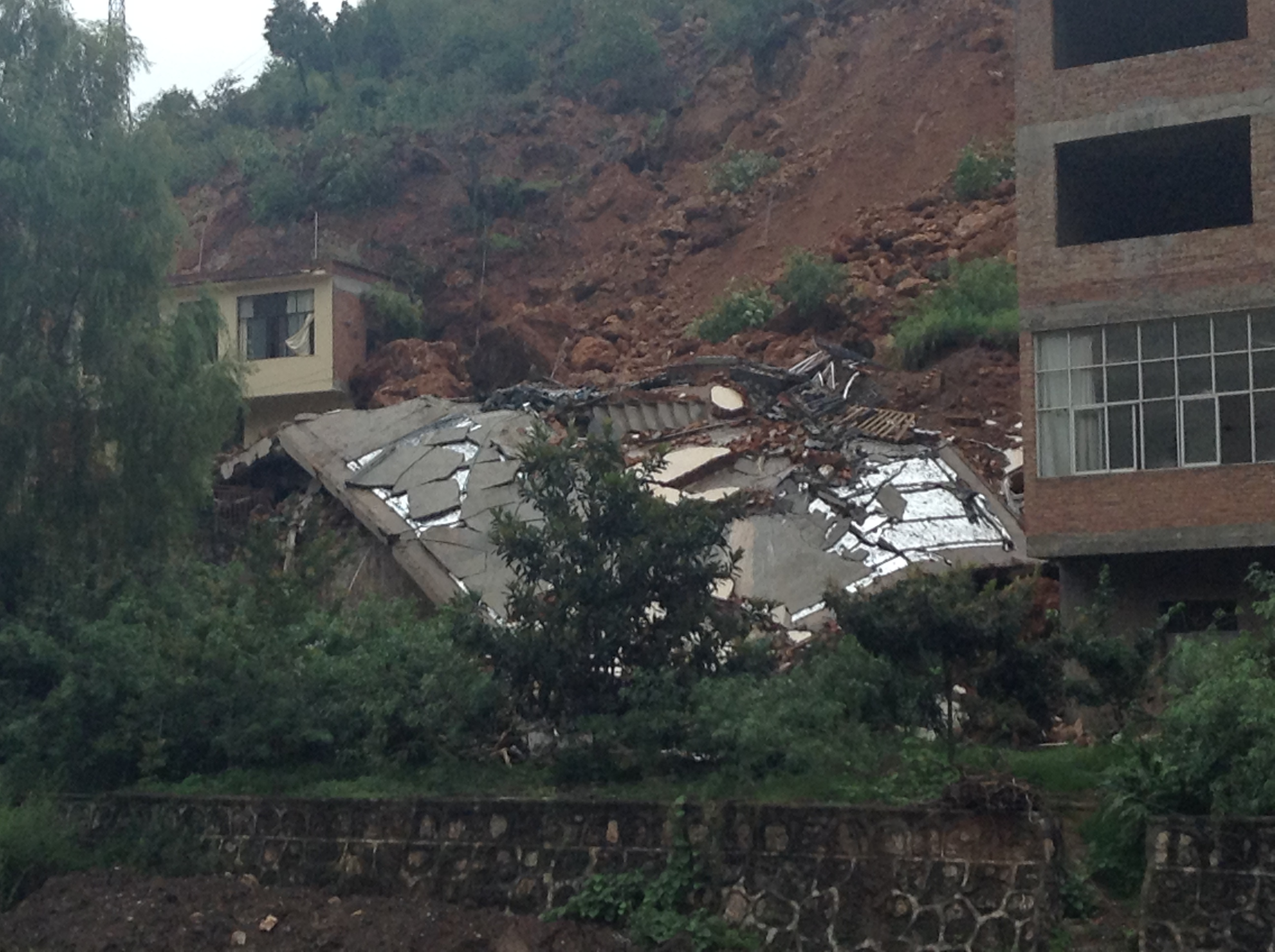
Longtoushan Town (龙头山镇) after the earthquake

Casualties	Ludian	Qiaojia	Zhaoyang	Huize	Total
Deaths	526 (As of 8 August 7:00 UTC)	78 (As of 8 August 7:00 UTC)	1 (As of 8 August 7:00 UTC)	12 (As of 8 August 7:00 UTC)	617 (As of 8 August 7:00 UTC)
Injured	1,713 (As of 5 August 6:30 UTC)	290 (As of 5 August 6:30 UTC)	?	370 (As of 5 August 6:30 UTC)	3,143 (As of 8 August 7:00 UTC)
Missing	109 (As of 8 August 7:00 UTC)	3 (As of 8 August 7:00 UTC)	0	0	112 (As of 8 August 7:00 UTC)

The earthquake caused significant damage in the immediate vicinity of the epicenter, principally in the city of Zhaotong, where power outages and significant structural damage were reported. Chinese authorities announced that the quake left at least 391 dead, and over 1,801 injured.

According to the South China Morning Post, the tremor was felt in nearby towns, including the capital of Yunnan, Kunming, also in Chongqing, Leshan and Chengdu in the neighboring province of Sichuan. Road access to Longquan Village (龙泉村) of Longtoushan Town (龙头山镇), Ludian County, was blocked, where buildings collapsed. In Ludian, it was reported that around 12,000 homes had collapsed, many of them being aged brick structures.

== Aftershocks ==
From 3 August 6 UTC until 21 UTC, 9 aftershocks of M 3.0 or higher were recorded by the China Seismic Bureau. The largest aftershock measured M 4.2.

Number	Date	(° N)	(°E)	Focal depth (km)	Magnitude	Location	Earthquake time (BJT)
1	3 August 2014	27.1	103.3	12	6.5	Ludian County, Zhaotong City, Yunnan Province	16:03:10
2	3 August 2014	27.1	103.4	5	3.3	Ludian County, Zhaotong City, Yunnan Province	16:45:18
3	3 August 2014	27.1	103.4	5	3.1	Ludian County, Zhaotong City, Yunnan Province	18:12:41
4	3 August 2014	27.1	103.4	9	3.1	Ludian County, Zhaotong City, Yunnan Province	18:34:00
5	3 August 2014	27.1	103.4	5	4	Ludian County, Zhaotong City, Yunnan Province	19:07:20
6	3 August 2014	27	103.4	8	3.1	Ludian County, Zhaotong City, Yunnan Province	19:46:31
7	3 August 2014	27.1	103.4	5	4.1	Ludian County, Zhaotong City, Yunnan Province	21:47:07
8	3 August 2014	27.1	103.3	11	4.1	Ludian County, Zhaotong City, Yunnan Province	22:28:29
9	4 August 2014	27.1	103.4	5	4.2	Ludian County, Zhaotong City, Yunnan Province	3:30:31
10	4 August 2014	27.1	103.4	5	3.1	Ludian County, Zhaotong City, Yunnan Province	7:06:10

== Response and relief ==
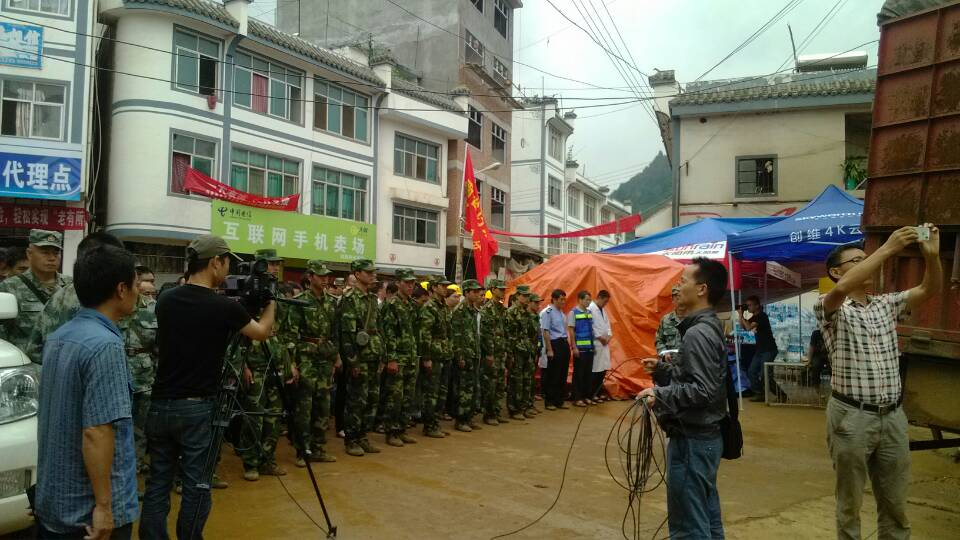
Mourning held on 8 August 2014 in Baogunao (包谷垴乡) for victims of the Ludian earthquake

The Chinese government sent a 30-man team to the epicentre region immediately after the earthquake struck, as well as 2,000 tents, 3,000 folding beds, 3,000 quilts, and 3,000 coats to provide shelter for the displaced and homeless. The majority of the injured were transported to safe areas.

Chinese Premier Li Keqiang, who flew to the epicenter on the morning of 4 August, sent a joint working group to investigate and assist the locals in the rescue.

== Donations ==
As of 17:00 (UTC+8) on 15 August 2014, Yunnan Province received ¥536 million in donated money and ¥50 million in donated goods. The donations came from a wide array of government groups and privately owned companies.

== See also ==
- List of earthquakes in Yunnan
- List of earthquakes in China
- List of earthquakes in 2014
