= 1970 Tonghai earthquake =

1970 earthquake in southwest China and northern Vietnam

- Location within Yunnan
- UTC time: 1970-01-04 17:00:41
- ISC event: 799712
- USGS-ANSS: ComCat
- Local date: 5 January 1970
- Local time: 01:00:41
- Magnitude: 7.1 M_{w}
- Depth: 11 km (6.8 mi)
- Epicenter: 24.19°N 102.54°E
- Type: Strike-slip
- Areas affected: People's Republic of China
- Total damage: Between USD 5 to 25 million
- Max. intensity: MMI X (Extreme)
- Casualties: 10,000–15,621 dead 26,783 injured

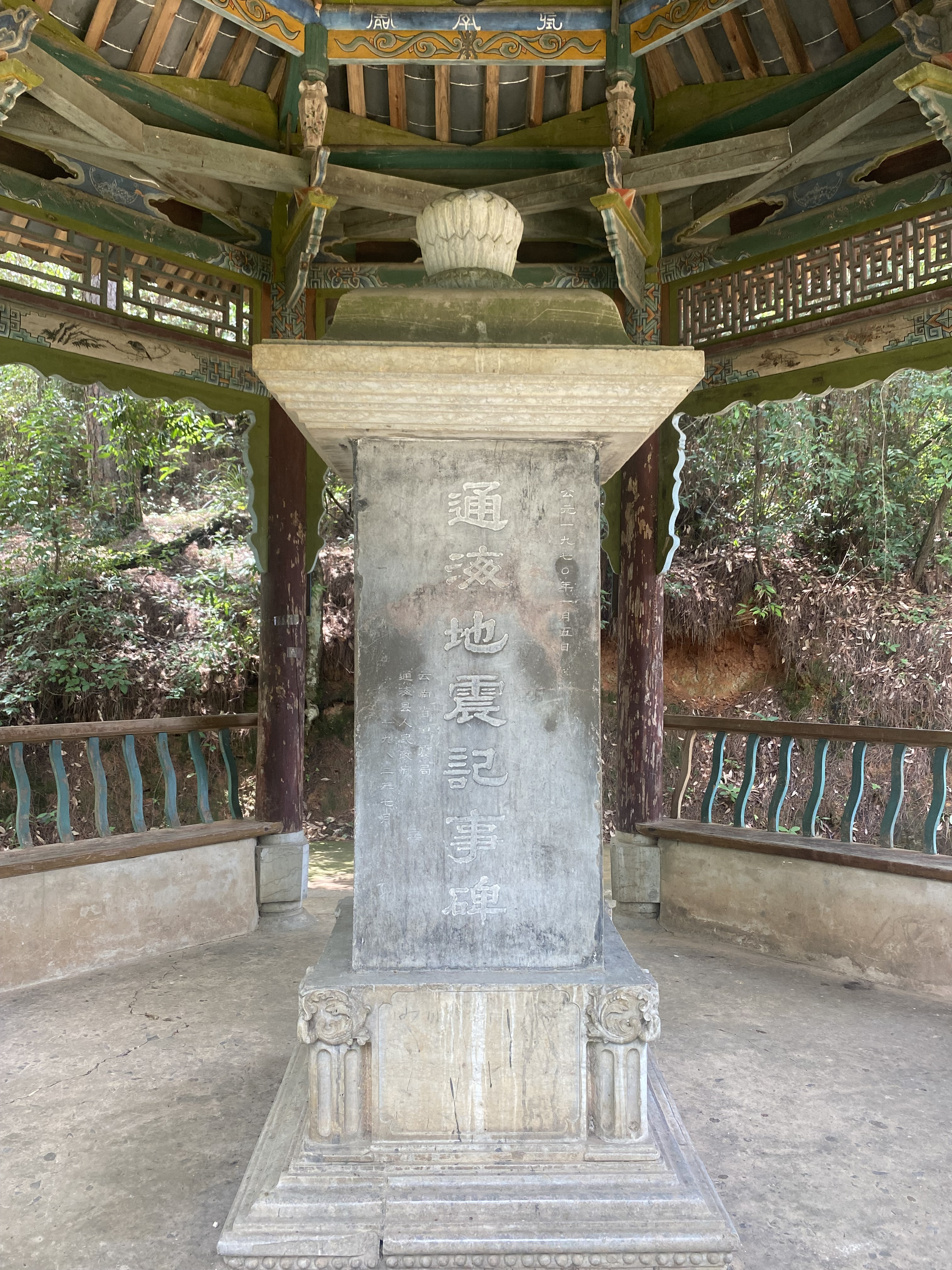
Tonghai Earthquake Memorial Monument, erected at Fengyi Pavilion of Xiushan Park

An earthquake occurred in Tonghai, Yunnan province, China at 01:00:41 local time on 5 January 1970 with a moment magnitude of 7.1 and a maximum Mercalli intensity of X (Extreme). The strike-slip rupture originated on the Red River Fault, which had not experienced an earthquake above magnitude 7 since 1700. At least 10,000 people were killed, making it one of the deadliest in its decade. The tremor caused between US$5 and $25 million in damage, (Note: This would cost roughly US$41 million to US$207 million in 2024.) felt over an area of 8,781 km^{2} (3,390 sq mi). In Hanoi, North Vietnam, almost 483 km (300 mi) from the epicenter, victims left their homes as the rupture rumbled through the city.

Occurring during the height of the Cultural Revolution, it was not widely publicized by the Chinese government for well over a decade. The amount of aid and finances distributed was described by the Beijing Morning Post as "pathetically small". Much of the aid provided to survivors was in "spiritual" form, including Mao Zedong badges and condolence letters. Nevertheless, the earthquake was among the first to be studied over a long term by the Chinese government. It was cited as one of the reasons behind creating the largest earthquake monitoring system in China, 25 years later.

== Background and tectonics ==
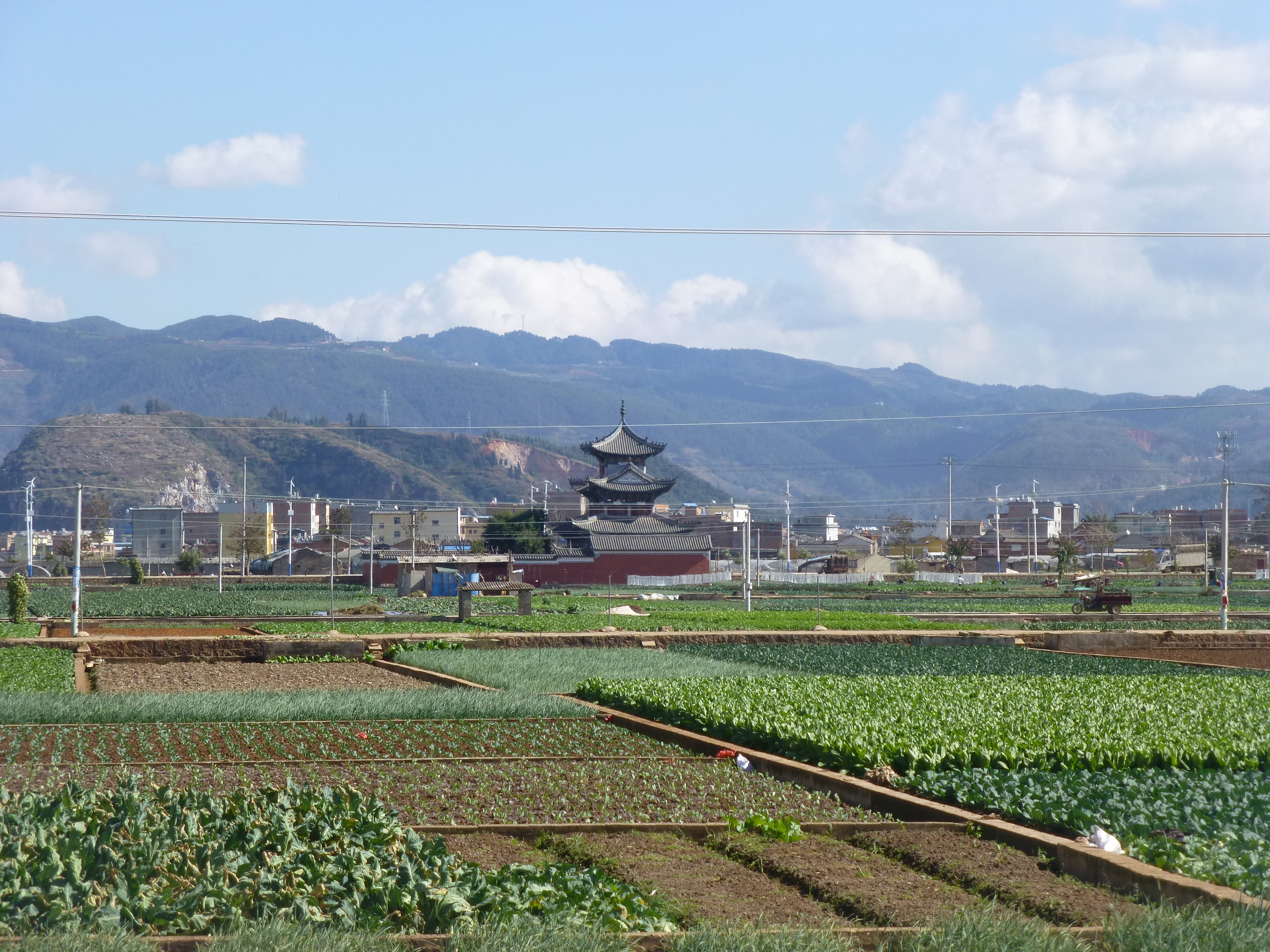
Fertile plains around Qilu Lake in Tonghai County

Yunnan, the epicentral region, is one of the more seismically active Chinese provinces. The earliest earthquake recorded there was in the 9th century; however, moderate to strong ones have been observed since the 15th century. Since the 9th century, 32 earthquakes with a magnitude of 7 or greater have occurred in the province. Shallow strike-slip faulting is a characteristic of Yunnan quakes.

Earthquakes in southwestern Yunnan, such as the 1970 Tonghai event, are less frequent than in other parts of the province. The Red River Fault, the fault on which this quake is alleged to have occurred, has lacked seismological activity as a whole. Red River temblors generally rise at high angles, as shown in a 1962 Ministry of Geology report. Marking in sedimentary rocks indicate that several large earthquakes formed on the fault during the Pleistocene and Holocene epochs. Until this quake, no earthquake above magnitude 7.0 on the Richter scale had occurred on this fault since about 1700, and the fault was believed to be "dead". Since the 1970 Tonghai rupture, it is believed that the Red River fault is instead experiencing a long seismic gap similar to that of the Japan Median Tectonic Line, on which no major temblor has formed since 700 but produced massive ones during the Holocene epoch.

== Damage and casualties ==
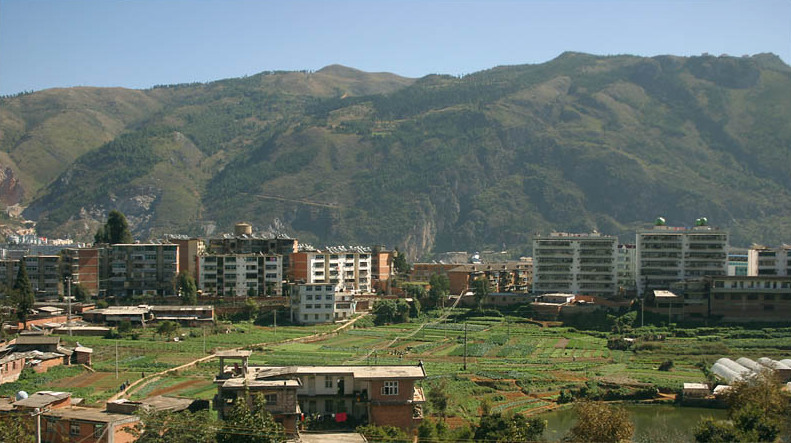
The city of Gejiu was 97 km (60 mi) from the epicenter

The epicenter of the quake was about 121 km (75 mi) southwest of Kunming and 97 km (60 mi) northwest of Gejiu; this area was mainly a tobacco-growing region. Effects of the rupture were felt over an area of 8,781 km^{2} (3,390 sq mi). In Hanoi, North Vietnam, almost 483 km (300 mi) from the epicenter, victims left their homes as the rupture rumbled through the city.

The earthquake measured 7.1 on the moment magnitude scale. It may have killed more than 15,000 people, making it the third deadliest in China during the 20th century, and injured an additional 26,783. The tremor caused between US$5 to $25 million in damage. A Reuters news report, the only one in the immediate aftermath, mentioned the recording of a "severe" quake by Hong Kong's Royal Observatory and cited an unconfirmed report that it might have destroyed part of Kunming. It caused 50 km (31 mi) of visible surface faulting on the Tonghai Fault. There was a maximum horizontal offset of 2.5 m (8 ft) and vertical offset of about 0.5 m (1.5 ft). As a result of inversion techniques, scientists were able to decide that several events comprised the surface faulting. This further confirmed that the earthquake, along with a later earthquake in Yunnan in 1973, corresponded to a fault within the area.

== Aftermath ==
=== Scientific study ===
The earthquake was among the first to be studied over a long term by the Chinese government. More than 40 Chinese seismologists, engineers, and geologists visited the disaster zone to conduct research into the cause and damage of the earthquake; some spending as much as a year collecting soil samples and recording other primary research evidence for future study. Such data was collected over a broad area of almost 1,400 towns within the area.

=== Reaction ===
According to the Reuters report, the survivors came together to "fight against the disaster". Much of the aid provided to survivors was in "spiritual" form. The Chinese government sent tens of thousands of Quotations from Chairman Mao Zedong books and badges in his honor to victims as part of the relief effort, and survivors also received 14,350 sympathy letters. However, the amount of aid and finances distributed was described by the Beijing Morning Post 30 years later as "pathetically small."

The details of the earthquake were not widely publicized by Chinese authorities until about 18 years after its occurrence. In China's first decades of Communist rule, its policy was to not disclose natural disasters or accidents unless foreigners were injured. While the Chinese official press had not released a comprehensive report, Reuters and the Royal Hong Kong Observatory both released information soon after the disaster. At the time of the quake, Xinhua News Agency briefly mentioned a smaller magnitude quake but did not provide information on damage or casualties.

On 19 November 1988, nearly 19 years later, Chen Zhangli of the State Seismology Bureau, speaking at a news conference for another earthquake that had recently occurred, estimated the death toll of the 1970 quake to be 10,000. He did not give a reason why his government had not previously disclosed this knowledge. Government officials from China released a different estimate in 2000, putting the death toll at 15,621. China published the estimate after a memorial service for survivors and relatives was held in Yuxi on 5 January. A Yuxi Seismology Bureau official noted that the information had been classified for "political reasons" and the death toll estimate had been known among bureaucrats as early as 1997.

Twenty-five years after the earthquake, the largest earthquake-monitoring network nationally was established in Yunnan. It set up earthquake offices in every county to prepare for another large rupture. The 1970 Tonghai earthquake was cited as one of the reasons behind creating the monitoring system.

== See also ==
- List of earthquakes in 1970
- List of earthquakes in Yunnan
- List of earthquakes in China

== Bibliography ==
- Allen, C. R.; A. R. Gillespie; Han Yuan; Kerry E. Sieh; Zhang Buchun; Zhu Chengnan (June 1984). "Red River and associated faults, Yunnan Province, China; Quaternary geology, slip rates, and seismic hazard". Geological Society of America Bulletin. 95 (6): 686–700. Bibcode:1984GSAB...95..686A. doi:10.1130/0016-7606(1984)95<686:RRAAFY>2.0.CO;2. Archived from the original on 16 October 2015.
- Chen, Wai-Fah; Charles Scawthorn (2002). Earthquake Engineering Handbook. CRC Press. ISBN 978-0-8493-0068-4.
- Hu, Yu-Xian; Shih Chi Liu; Weimin Dong (1996). Earthquake Engineering. Taylor & Francis. ISBN 978-0-419-20590-6.
- Zschau, Jochen; Andreas N. Küppers (2003). Early Warning Systems for Natural Disaster Reduction. Springer. ISBN 978-3-540-67962-2.
