= Ludian County =

Ludian County 鲁甸县
- County
- Location of Ludian County (red) and Zhaotong City (pink) within Yunnan province

- Location of the seat in Yunnan
- Coordinates: 27°11′15″N 103°33′27″E
- Country: People's Republic of China
- Province: Yunnan
- Prefecture-level city: Zhaotong

Area
  - Total: 1,487 km^{2} (574 sq mi)

Population (2010)
  - Total: 429,791
  - Density: 289.0/km^{2} (748.6/sq mi)
- Postal code: 657100
- Area code: 0870
- Website: www.ludian.gov.cn

Ludian County (simplified Chinese: 鲁甸县; traditional Chinese: 魯甸縣; pinyin: Lǔdiàn Xiàn) is a county under the administration of the prefecture-level city of Zhaotong, it lies in the north east of Yunnan Province, China, and shares land borders with Guizhou Province. The west and east of the county are high terrains, and the middle is low and flat. Agriculture and smelting industry make the greatest contribution to its economy.

== History ==
From 135 BC (under the reign of Emperor Wu of Han), Ludian was put under the administration of Zhuti County (朱提縣), Zhuti Commandery. In 584, the county area became part of Kaibian county, Gongzhou Prefecture. In 754, the Tang Empire fought a war with Nanzhao, the Ludian area was annexed to Wumeng Tribe of Nanzhao. During the Song dynasty period, it was administrated by Kingdom of Dali. In 1273 during the Yuan dynasty, Wumeng Pacification Bureau was established, and the Ludian area belonged to Wumeng Circle, carrying out Military Garrison system. A lot of Han and Hui population entered this area during the Ming dynasty. Under the reign of Yongzheng Emperor, the forced implementation of new land measures aroused rebellion in Wumeng area. After the rebellion was quelled, Wumeng was put under control of Yunnan. In 1731 the Ludian Subprefecture was established, and an earth wall was built around it.

In 1913 the subprefecture became a county, a county council was established, and during the following decades the towns and districts expanded. In July 1931 the government started to build the first road through the county. In 1940 the new county seat Kaihuajie was built, and in October 1943 Taoyuan Reservoir was constructed. In November 1949 the People's Liberation Army occupied Ludian, five months later the people's government was established. It launched Campaign to Suppress Counterrevolutionaries and Land reform from 1951. In the end of 1968 the Revolutionary Committee was established, in February 1975 the Primary Power Station in Shaba River was built. From the 1980s the agriculture in Ludian developed quickly. From 1982 to 1985, the first soil survey, land resources survey and cultural relics survey were conducted. In August 2014 the county was struck by the 2014 Ludian earthquake which killed over 600 people.

== Geography ==
The county area lies on the eastern margin of Lüzhi River – Xiaojiang River North-South Tectonic Belt, its main structure is northeastward. The north–south trending structure only occupies the northwest part of the county. Luomakou structural belt has a great influence on the development of geological structure in Ludian area, the geographical position for the belt is east longitude 103°8′ - 103°43′, north latitude 26°50′ - 27°20′. The belt consists of several fault zones and fold structures, Ludian Basin and Baoshan Basin locates at this area.

Alpine gorge landform is common in the county area, due to intensive erosion by Niulan River and its tributary Shaba River. Only Zhaolu Basin in the east of the county, Longshu Basin in the north, and karst landscapes in the south are relatively flat. The terrain descends from west to the east, although Niulan River coastal region is an exception. The highest place is the top of Wulianfeng Mountain, in the altitude of more than 2,500 meters. The lower step is in the north and central region of the county, with an elevation of about 2,200 meters. The third area's elevation is about 1,950 meters (Taoyuan, Ciyuan and Wenping Basin), it's more suitable for developing agriculture because of its fertile soil. Main peaks in Ludian include Mount Dahei, Mount Xiaohei, Mount Jilong, Mount Guludapo, Mount Gangouliangzi, Mount Huoganliangzi, Mount Maomao, Mount Dafo, Mount Sanguozhuang and Mount Aluboliangzi.

Niulan River flows through the south and west part of the county. Its tributaries include Shaba River, Longquan River, Heishi River, Yuanjia River and Kelang River. Zhaolu River and Taoyuan River flow into Sayu River in northeastern Ludian. The mean annual precipitation is 1,015.50 millimeters, the yearly runoff amount is 563 million cubic metres. Ludian has a groundwater storage of 171 million cubic metres, 98 percent of which are spring water. Most springs concentrated in Niulan River Valley. Lujia Dragon Pool is the main source for drinking water at the county seat. There are two major hot springs, Gantian Hot Spring and Yinchang Hot Spring.

Ludian lies in the north of Yunnan–Guizhou Plateau, has a low latitude upland monsoon climate. There is no significant temperature difference between the four seasons. From November to April of the next year is dry season, and from May to October is wet season, when more climatic disasters happen.

=== Climate ===
Climate data for Ludian, elevation 1,952 m (6,404 ft), (1991–2020 normals, extremes 1981–2010)
Month	Jan	Feb	Mar	Apr	May	Jun	Jul	Aug	Sep	Oct	Nov	Dec	Year
Record high °C (°F)	24.3 (75.7)	25.0 (77.0)	29.9 (85.8)	30.5 (86.9)	32.9 (91.2)	32.8 (91.0)	32.7 (90.9)	32.2 (90.0)	33.1 (91.6)	28.0 (82.4)	24.7 (76.5)	25.5 (77.9)	33.1 (91.6)
Mean daily maximum °C (°F)	10.6 (51.1)	13.7 (56.7)	18.2 (64.8)	21.9 (71.4)	23.6 (74.5)	24.4 (75.9)	25.7 (78.3)	25.5 (77.9)	22.7 (72.9)	18.1 (64.6)	15.7 (60.3)	11.1 (52.0)	19.3 (66.7)
Daily mean °C (°F)	3.1 (37.6)	5.8 (42.4)	9.7 (49.5)	13.9 (57.0)	16.7 (62.1)	18.7 (65.7)	20.1 (68.2)	19.6 (67.3)	16.8 (62.2)	12.6 (54.7)	8.8 (47.8)	4.0 (39.2)	12.5 (54.5)
Mean daily minimum °C (°F)	−1.2 (29.8)	0.9 (33.6)	4.3 (39.7)	8.6 (47.5)	12.0 (53.6)	15.0 (59.0)	16.3 (61.3)	15.7 (60.3)	13.2 (55.8)	9.5 (49.1)	4.7 (40.5)	0.2 (32.4)	8.3 (46.9)
Record low °C (°F)	−7.8 (18.0)	−9.7 (14.5)	−6.9 (19.6)	−1.5 (29.3)	0.5 (32.9)	7.5 (45.5)	9.0 (48.2)	6.8 (44.2)	2.8 (37.0)	−0.6 (30.9)	−6 (21)	−11 (12)	−11 (12)
Average precipitation mm (inches)	15.2 (0.60)	14.9 (0.59)	23.7 (0.93)	34.1 (1.34)	70.5 (2.78)	160.8 (6.33)	188.2 (7.41)	145.0 (5.71)	105.5 (4.15)	72.7 (2.86)	19.2 (0.76)	8.8 (0.35)	858.6 (33.81)
Average precipitation days (≥ 0.1 mm)	7.8	7.8	8.7	9.9	13.5	18.5	17.7	17.0	15.8	16.2	8.0	8.5	149.4
Average snowy days	7.3	5.4	2.0	0.2	0	0	0	0	0	0	1.0	4.7	20.6
Average relative humidity (%)	74	69	66	66	70	77	79	79	81	82	78	78	75
Mean monthly sunshine hours	135.9	149.8	192.0	201.8	182.6	139.8	157.8	166.1	133.2	103.2	131.7	118.8	1,812.7
Percentage possible sunshine	41	47	51	52	44	34	38	41	36	29	41	37	41
Source: China Meteorological Administration

== Administrative divisions ==
Ludian County has 10 towns and 2 ethnic townships.

10 towns

- Wenping (文屏镇)
- Shuimo (水磨镇)
- Longtoushan (龙头山镇)
- Xiaozhai (小寨镇)
- Jiangdi (江底镇)
- Huode Hong (火德红镇)
- Longshu (龙树镇)
- Xinjie (新街镇)
- Suoshan (梭山镇)
- Lehong (乐红镇)

2 ethnic townships

- Taoyuan Hui (桃源回族乡)
- Ciyuan Hui (茨院回族乡)

== Demographics ==
Ludian had a registered population of 429,791 in 2010, among them 28,134 were non-agricultural. Among the resident population, 204,595 were males and 186,059 were females. The population sex ratio was 109.96, higher than the average of Yunnan province, and still kept growing. More than 80 percent of the county's populace was Han, 16.6 percent Hui, 2.4 percent Yi, 0.1 percent Miao. There were 13 minority groups living in the county.

== Economy ==
Corn, rice, buckwheat, wheat, beans, potatoes are main food crops produced in Ludian. In 2014 there is 200 thousand acres of corn planted in Ludian. The corm plant Amorphophallus albus has been introduced to Ludian these years, in 2014 its planting area was 7500 acres. Peanut, sesame, Perilla frutescens, sunflower, ramie, hemp, sugarcane, local tobacco are main economic crops planted in Ludian before 1949, after 1950 exotic tobacco became dominant in this area. In 2013, about 67.3 acres of tobacco were planted. Animal husbandry in Ludian largely relies on domestic pigs, bovini, horses, caprids, chickens and ducks, local animal varieties in the county include Wujin pig, Zhaotong cattle, Yanjin buffalo, Weixin buffalo, Wumeng horse, Zhaotong goat, Zhaotong sheep and Ludian chicken. In 2013, the total output value of agriculture was 1,526.58 million yuan, with 170610 tonnes of grain production and 27834 tonnes of meat production.

Most enterprises lie in Ludian Industrial Park, which was established in July 2003. Until the end of 2013, 42 enterprises had entered the park, among which ten had an industrial output of more than ten thousand yuan: Haolong Cement Plant, Xingyu Company, Kunhua Chemical Industry Company, Lishi Company, Power Supply Company, Wanlong Chemical Industry Company, Huodehong Mining Plant, Lehong Mining Plant, Haolong Commercial Concrete Co., Ltd., Yunnan Hongsheng Tower Industrial Co., Ltd. In 2013 Ludian had an industrial output of 4,582.99 million yuan, smelting, nonferrous metal mining, cement manufacturing and food manufacturing played an important role.

The 2014 earthquake had caused a total economic loss of more than 2,000 million yuan.

== Transport ==
In ancient times Ludian was a courier station on the Tea Horse Road. There was a five-chi road built in the Qin dynasty. By the end of 2007, there was one national highway of 19 kilometers (China National Highway 213), two provincial roads of 108 kilometers, eight county and town level roads of 289.3 kilometers in Ludian. six passenger stations provided transport lines to Zhaotong and Kunming. In Jiangdi town there were four major bridges: one iron chain bridge (built in the Qing dynasty), one steel girder bridge (built in Republican era), one double arch bridge (built in 1970s) and one highway bridge (built in 2007).

== Natural and historical sites ==
Major places of interest in Ludian include Yanchishan Tourism Area, Tuogu Mosque, Lemachang Ancient Silver Deposit Site and Neolithic Site in Machang Village. Yanchishan is two kilometers south the county seat, has a water area of 1,250 acres, provides tourists area for swimming, fishing and other entertainment forms. Tuogu Mosque was built in 1730, occupies an area of 4,000 square meters, locates about 10 kilometers east of the county seat. It is a Historical and Cultural Site Protected at the Provincial Level. Lemachang Ancient Silver Deposit Site is a Historical and Cultural Site Protected at the City Level, locates 42 kilometers southwest of the county seat. From the Han dynasty Lemachang has been a major producing area of Zhuti Silver, a kind of high quality silver. During the reign of Qianlong Emperor and Jiaqing Emperor, there were more than 100 thousands miners, they could produce more than 500,000 taels of silver every year. The Neolithic Site in Machang was first discovered in 1962, located about five kilometers east of the county seat, has an area of more than 100 thousands square meters. The thickness of its cultural layer is 1.3 meters. Broken pottery pieces unearthed there are mostly belong to grey pottery, and some belong to red pottery.
