= Red River Fault =

Seismic fault in China and Vietnam

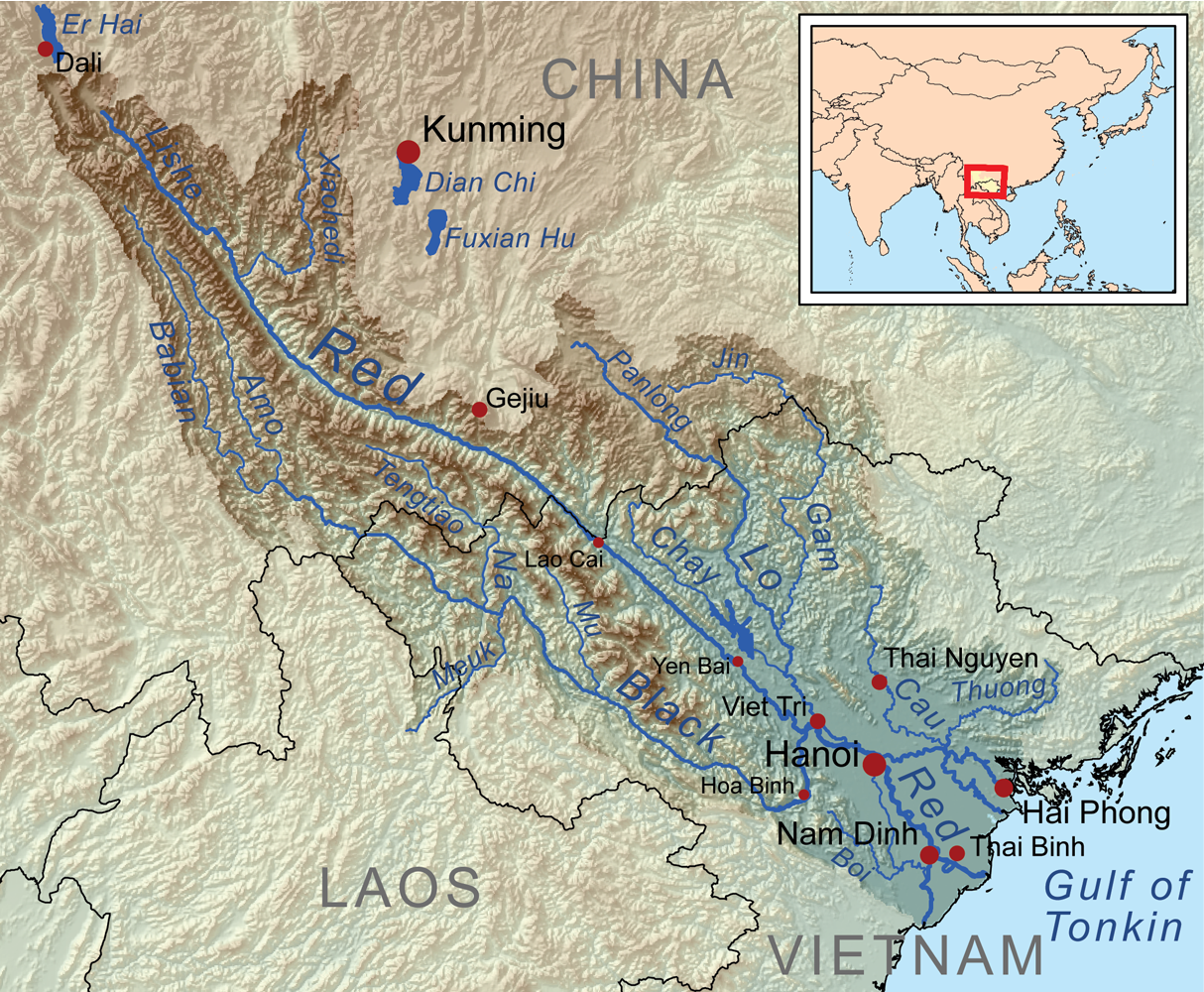
Topographic map showing the Red River and fault

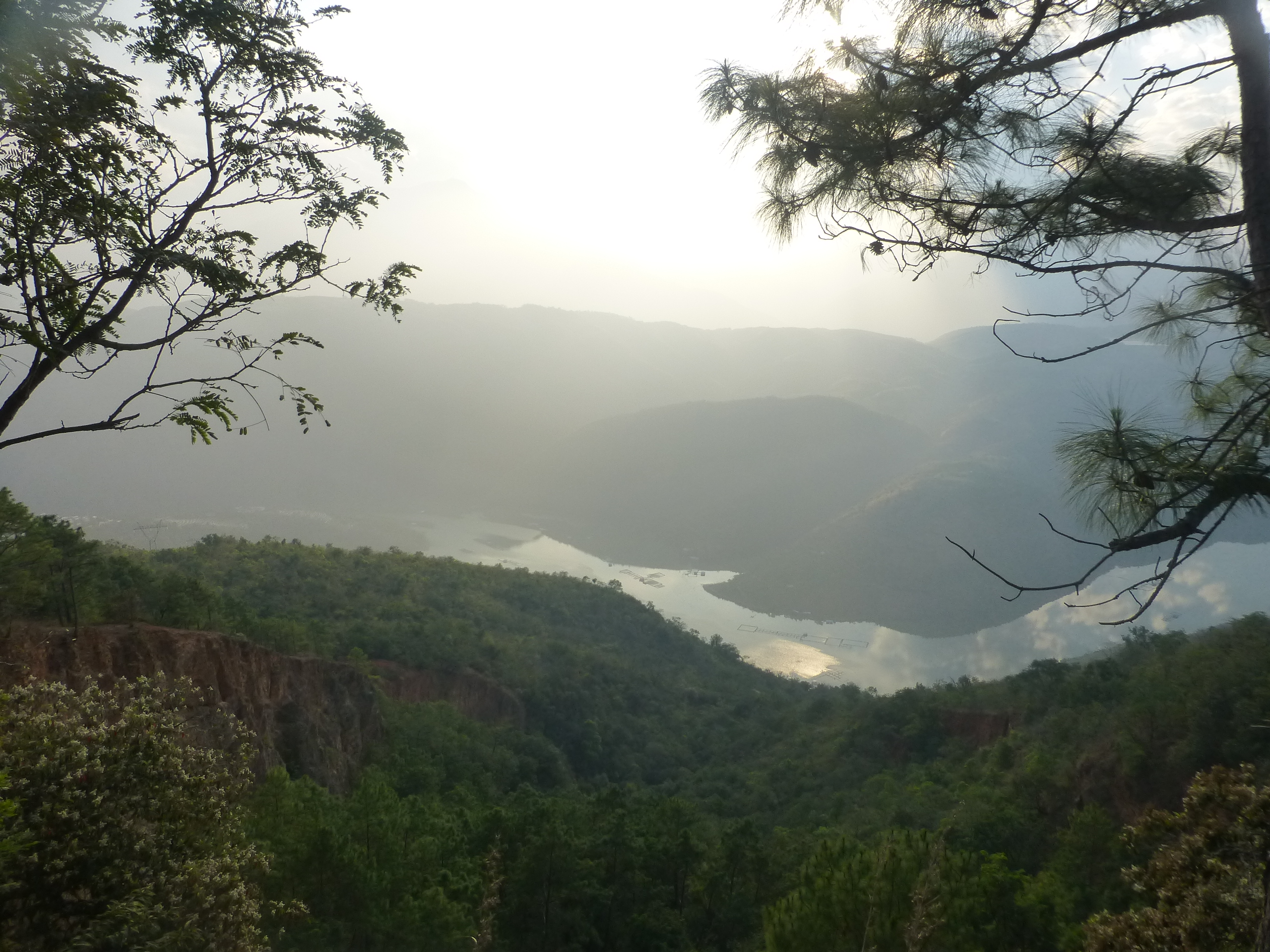
The Red River (Nansha Reservoir) seen from the slope of its deep valley, south of Potou Township, Jianshui County

The Red River Fault or Song Hong Fault (Vietnamese: Đới Đứt Gãy Sông Hồng) is a major fault in Yunnan, China and Vietnam which accommodates continental China's (Yangtze plate) southward movement. It is coupled with that of the Sagaing Fault in Burma, which accommodates the Indian plate's northward movement, with the land (Indochina) in between faulted and twisted clockwise. It was responsible for the 1970 Tonghai earthquake.

It is named after the Red River which runs through the valley eroded along the fault trace.

The Red River Fault was a sinistral strike-slip shear zone until Miocene times when it became reactivated as a brittle dextral strike-slip fault.

== See also ==
- 1970 Tonghai earthquake
- 1925 Dali earthquake
- 2021 Dali earthquake
