= 1976 earthquake =

1976 earthquake may refer to:

== Earthquake geological events ==
- 1976 Bali earthquake
- 1976 Çaldıran–Muradiye earthquake (Turkey)
- 1976 Friuli earthquake (Italy)
- 1976 Guatemala earthquake
- 1976 Moro Gulf earthquake (Philippines) (great, tsunami)
- 1976 Papua earthquake (Indonesia)
- 1976 Songpan–Pingwu earthquake (China)
- 1976 Tangshan earthquake (China) (great), also known as the "Great Tangshan earthquake"

== Sports ==
- 1976 San Jose Earthquakes season, a year involved for the professional soccer club San Jose Earthquakes (1974–88)
