= Memorial Wall =

A memorial wall is a wall typically engraved to commemorate a number of people with something in common (e.g., from one country or place) killed in a single conflict, violent event, or disaster, often with names.

Memorial Walls include:

- Many memorial walls without specific names in places such as crematoriums and synagogues
- Memorial Wall of Royal Australian Air Force Memorial
- Memorial Stadium (Baltimore)#Memorial wall (US)
- Budapest Ghetto § Memorial Wall
- Canadian National Vimy Memorial (France)
- CIA Memorial Wall (US)
- Memorial Wall of Cenotaph War Memorial, Colombo (Sri Lanka)
- DIA Memorial Wall (US)
- FDNY memorial wall (New York City, US)
- Korean War Memorial Wall (disambiguation)
- Korean War Memorial Wall (Canada)
- Walls of Kranji War Memorial (Singapore)
- Memorial for the Disappeared (Chile)
- Piccadilly, Warwickshire#Miners Memorial Wall (England)
- Tangshan Earthquake Memorial Wall (China)
- Veterans Memorial Wall (US)
- Vietnam Veterans Memorial (US)
  - The Moving Wall, replica of Vietnam Veterans Memorial
