= List of earthquakes in 1976 =

Earthquakes in 1976
Approximate epicenters of the earthquakes in 1976
- 4.0–5.9 magnitude
- 6.0–6.9 magnitude
- 7.0–7.9 magnitude
- 8.0+ magnitude
- Strongest: New Zealand, Kermadec Islands, January 14; Philippines, Mindanao, August 16 (both Magnitude 8.0)
- Deadliest: China, Hebei Province (Magnitude 7.5), July 27, 242,769 deaths
- Total fatalities: 286,873

Number by magnitude
- 9.0+: 0
- 8.0–8.9: 2
- 7.0–7.9: 12
- 6.0–6.9: 59
- 5.0–5.9: 1,665
- 4.0–4.9: 2,544

This is a list of earthquakes in 1976. Only earthquakes of magnitude 6 or above are included, unless they result in damage and/or casualties, or are notable for some other reason. All dates are listed according to UTC time. Maximum intensities are indicated on the Mercalli intensity scale and are sourced from United States Geological Survey (USGS) ShakeMap data. The main point of note from this year was the devastation seen across the globe from several catastrophic events. Several countries experienced their worst ever natural disasters. Chronologically, Guatemala in February suffered 23,000 deaths. Indonesia in June had an earthquake causing 6,000 deaths. China in July had officially 242,000 deaths from the 1976 Tangshan earthquake. This was the worst toll from an earthquake for over 400 years. Shortly afterwards the Philippines had 8,000 fatalities. Towards the year end Turkey had an event resulting in 5,000 deaths. Although not as devastating Italy had nearly 1,000 deaths in May with subsequent aftershocks causing further destruction.

== By death toll ==
Rank	Death toll	Magnitude	Location	MMI	Depth (km)	Date
1	242,769	7.5	China, Hebei Province	XI (Extreme)	23.0	July 27
2	23,000	7.5	Guatemala, Izabal Department	IX (Violent)	5.0	February 4
3	8,000	8.0	Philippines, Mindanao	VIII (Severe)	33.0	August 16
4	6,000	7.1	Indonesia, Papua (province)	VII (Very strong)	33.0	June 25
5	5,000	7.3	Turkey, Van Province	X (Extreme)	36.0	November 24
6	978	6.5	Italy, Fruili Venezia Giulia	X (Extreme)	9.0	May 6
7	573	6.5	Indonesia, Bali	VII (Very strong)	40.0	July 14
8	133	7.1	Indonesia, Papua (province)	VIII (Severe)	33.0	October 29
= 9	101	6.9	China, Yunnan	IX (Violent)	8.0	May 29
= 9	101	7.0	China, Yunnan	IX (Violent)	10.0	May 29
= 9	101	7.4	China, Hebei Province	IX (Violent)	26.0	July 28
10	49	5.6	Afghanistan, Balkh Province	VIII (Severe)	33.0	March 19
11	17	6.2	Iran, South Khorasan province	VIII (Severe)	13.0	November 7
12	11	6.0	Italy, Friuli-Venezia Giulia	IX (Violent)	10.0	September 15
13	10	6.7	Ecuador, Esmeraldas Province	VIII (Severe)	9.0	April 9

Listed are earthquakes with at least 10 dead.

== By magnitude ==
Rank	Magnitude	Death toll	Location	MMI	Depth (km)	Date
= 1	8.0	0	New Zealand, Kermadec Islands	VII (Very strong)	33.0	January 14
= 1	8.0	8,000	Philippines, Mindanao	VIII (Severe)	33.0	August 16
= 2	7.5	23,000	Guatemala, Izabel Department	VIII (Severe)	5.0	February 4
= 2	7.5	242,769	China, Hebei Province	XI (Extreme)	23.0	July 27
3	7.4	101	China, Hebei Province	IX (Violent)	26.0	July 28
4	7.3	5,000	Turkey, Van Province	X (Extreme)	36.0	November 24
= 5	7.1	6,000	Indonesia, Papua (province)	VII (Very strong)	33.0	June 25
= 5	7.1	133	Indonesia, Papua (province)	VIII (Severe)	33.0	October 29
= 6	7.0	0	Soviet Union, Kuril Islands, Russia	VIII (Severe)	41.0	January 21
= 6	7.0	0	Soviet Union, Bukhara Region, Uzbekistan	IX (Violent)	33.0	April 8
= 6	7.0	0	Soviet Union, Bukhara Region, Uzbekistan	X (Extreme)	10.0	May 17
= 6	7.0	101	China, Yunnan	IX (Violent)	10.0	May 29
= 6	7.0	0	Indonesia, Sumatra	VI (Strong)	33.0	June 20
= 6	7.0	5	Panama	IX (Violent)	3.0	July 11

Listed are earthquakes with at least 7.0 magnitude.

== By month ==
=== January ===
January
- Strongest: 7.9 M_{w} New Zealand
- Total fatalities: 0

Number by magnitude
- 8.0–8.9: 0
- 7.0–7.9: 3
- 6.0–6.9: 15
- 5.0–5.9: 235
- 4.0–4.9: 306

Date	Country and location	M_{w}	Depth (km)	MMI	Notes	Casualties	
Date	Country and location	M_{w}	Depth (km)	MMI	Notes	Dead	Injured
1	New Zealand, Kermadec Islands	7.3	42.5				
6	Soviet Union, Kamchatka Krai	6.1	35.0				
6	Soviet Union, Kamchatka Krai	6.3	29.1				
7	Soviet Union, Kamchatka Krai	6.4	30.6				
9	New Hebrides	6.3	172.1	IV			
13	Iceland, Northeastern Region, 37 km (23 mi) ENE of Norðurþing	6.4	10.0	IX	Some buildings damaged at Kópasker and three homes evacuated. Several bridges also damaged in the area.		
14	New Zealand, Kermadec Islands	7.8	45.0	VIII	Some damage reported.		
14	New Zealand, Kermadec Islands	7.9	45.0	VII	Tsunami reported and some damage on Raoul Island.		
14	New Zealand, Kermadec Islands	6.2	25.0				
14	New Zealand, Kermadec Islands	6.4	25.0				
15	New Zealand, Kermadec Islands	6.1	25.0				
18	Norway, Svalbard and Jan Mayen	6.3	15.0				
21	Russian SFSR, Kuril Islands	7.2	41.3	VI			
21	Russian SFSR, Kamchatka Krai	6.3	27.5	V			
22	Russian SFSR, Kuril Islands	6.1	35.9				
22	Indonesia, East Nusa Tenggara	6.7	614.1				
24	New Zealand, Kermadec Islands	6.2	60.0				
24	Russian SFSR, Kuril Islands	6.5	34.7				
27	New Zealand, Kermadec Islands	6.1	20.0				

=== February ===
February
- Strongest: 7.5 M_{w} Guatemala
- Deadliest: 7.5 M_{w} Guatemala; 23,000 deaths
- Total fatalities: 23,000

Number by magnitude
- 8.0–8.9: 0
- 7.0–7.9: 1
- 6.0–6.9: 2
- 5.0–5.9: 128
- 4.0–4.9: 189

Date	Country and location	M_{w}	Depth (km)	MMI	Notes	Casualties	
Date	Country and location	M_{w}	Depth (km)	MMI	Notes	Dead	Injured
4	Guatemala, Izabal 7 km (4.3 mi) north of Los Amates	7.5	5.0	IX	Further information: 1976 Guatemala earthquake	23,000	76,000
6	Papua New Guinea, Madang Province	6.0	37.0	VI			
15	Philippines, northeast of Samar	6.1	33.0				

=== March ===
March
- Strongest: 6.8 M_{w} New Zealand
- Deadliest: 5.9 M_{w} Afghanistan; 49 deaths
- Total fatalities: 55

Number by magnitude
- 8.0–8.9: 0
- 7.0–7.9: 0
- 6.0–6.9: 5
- 5.0–5.9: 119
- 4.0–4.9: 193

Date	Country and location	M_{w}	Depth (km)	MMI	Notes	Casualties	
Date	Country and location	M_{w}	Depth (km)	MMI	Notes	Dead	Injured
3	Indonesia, north of Flores	6.0	30.0	V			
4	New Hebrides, Vanuatu	6.4	90.0	VI			
8	United Kingdom, Santa Cruz Islands, Solomon Islands	6.1	47.0				
13	Papua New Guinea, west of Bougainville Island	6.1	50.0	V			
13	Guatemala, Chimaltenango Department	5.9	10.0	VII	Aftershock of February 4 event; 4 people were killed and 50 were injured.	4	50
19	Afghanistan, Balkh Province	5.9	20.0	VIII	At least 49 people dead, 59 injured and 20,000 homeless. More than 1,130 homes destroyed, 559 damaged and rockslides in the Kholm and Tashkurgan area.	49	59
24	New Zealand, Kermadec Islands	7.0	50.0		Aftershock of January 14 event.		
25	Turkey, Ardahan Province	5.2	15.0	VI	Two people were killed and 6 were injured. Some damage was reported.	2	6

=== April ===
April
- Strongest: 7.0 M_{w} Soviet Union, Uzbekistan
- Deadliest: 6.7 M_{w} Ecuador; 10 deaths
- Total fatalities: 14

Number by magnitude
- 8.0–8.9: 0
- 7.0–7.9: 1
- 6.0–6.9: 5
- 5.0–5.9: 95
- 4.0–4.9: 204

Date	Country and location	M_{w}	Depth (km)	MMI	Notes	Casualties	
Date	Country and location	M_{w}	Depth (km)	MMI	Notes	Dead	Injured
6	Papua New Guinea, north of New Britain	6.4	21.0	VI			
8	Soviet Union, Bukhara Region, Uzbekistan	7.0	33.0	IX	Doublet earthquake along with later event on May 17. Major damage was reported.		
8	Soviet Union, Bukhara Region, Uzbekistan	6.2	33.0	VIII	Aftershock.		
9	Ecuador, Esmeraldas Province	6.7	9.0	VIII	10 people died and property damages were around $4 million (1976 rate).	10	
10	Papua New Guinea, west of Bougainville Island	6.0	54.0	IV			
22	Iran, Fars province	6.0	24.0	VII			
29	Turkey, Ardahan Province	5.5	44.0	VII	4 people were killed and some damage was caused.	4	

=== May ===
May
- Strongest: 7.0 M_{w} 2 events.
- Deadliest: 6.5 M_{w} Italy; 990 deaths
- Total fatalities: 1,091

Number by magnitude
- 8.0–8.9: 0
- 7.0–7.9: 2
- 6.0–6.9: 7
- 5.0–5.9: 122
- 4.0–4.9: 230

Date	Country and location	M_{w}	Depth (km)	MMI	Notes	Casualties	
Date	Country and location	M_{w}	Depth (km)	MMI	Notes	Dead	Injured
4	New Zealand, South Island	6.6	19.0	VII			
5	New Zealand, Kermadec Islands	6.8	35.0		Aftershock of January 14 event.		
6	Italy, Friuli-Venezia Giulia	6.5	9.0	X	The 1976 Friuli earthquake caused 978 deaths and 1,700 injuries. Major property damage was caused. Costs were $3.6 billion (1976 rate).	990	1,700
11	Greece, Ionian Sea	6.4	33.0	V			
15	Peru, Junin Region	6.6	33.0	VII			
17	Soviet Union, Bukhara Region, Uzbekistan	7.0	10.0	X	Doublet earthquake along with event on April 8. Property damage costs were $85 million (1976 rate).		
29	China, Yunnan	6.9	8.0	rowspan="2"| Doublet earthquake. At least 101 people were killed and major damage was caused.	101		
29	China, Yunnan	7.0	10.0	IX	101		
31	China, Yunnan	6.2	14.0	VII	Aftershock.		

=== June ===
June
- Strongest: 7.1 M_{w} Indonesia
- Deadliest: 7.1 M_{w} Indonesia; 6,000 deaths
- Total fatalities: 6,000

Number by magnitude
- 8.0–8.9: 0
- 7.0–7.9: 2
- 6.0–6.9: 6
- 5.0–5.9: 130
- 4.0–4.9: 200

Date	Country and location	M_{w}	Depth (km)	MMI	Notes	Casualties	
Date	Country and location	M_{w}	Depth (km)	MMI	Notes	Dead	Injured
3	Papua New Guinea, southeast of New Ireland (island)	6.2	88.0	VI			
5	United Kingdom, Solomon Islands	6.2	61.0	V			
7	Philippines, east of Catanduanes	6.4	33.0	V			
7	Mexico, Guerrero	6.4	45.0	VI	Some damage was caused.		
17	Italy, Friuli-Venezia Giulia	6.1	24.0	VII	Aftershock of May 6 event.		
20	Indonesia, off the west coast of northern Sumatra	7.0	33.0	VI			
25	Indonesia, Papua (province)	7.1	33.0	VII	The 1976 Papua earthquake caused in total 6,000 deaths. Major damage was caused.	6,000	
26	Indonesia, Talaud Islands	6.5	33.0	VIII			

=== July ===
July
- Strongest: 7.5 M_{w} China
- Deadliest: 7.5 M_{w} China; 242,769 deaths
- Total fatalities: 243,347

Number by magnitude
- 8.0–8.9: 0
- 7.0–7.9: 3
- 6.0–6.9: 7
- 5.0–5.9: 149
- 4.0–4.9: 271

Date	Country and location	M_{w}	Depth (km)	MMI	Notes	Casualties	
Date	Country and location	M_{w}	Depth (km)	MMI	Notes	Dead	Injured
11	Panama, off the south coast	6.7	22.0	VIII	Foreshock. Some damage was caused.		
11	Panama, off the south coast	7.0	3.0	IX	5 people were killed and 7 were injured. Further damage was reported.	5	7
14	Indonesia, Bali	6.5	40.0	VII	The 1976 Bali earthquake caused 573 deaths. Another 4,755 people were injured. Damage costs were $195 million (1976 rate).	573	4,755
17	Papua New Guinea, New Ireland (island)	6.6	53.0	VII			
21	China, Yunnan	6.3	9.0	VII	Aftershock of May 29 event.		
26	Malaysia, Sabah	6.2	33.0	VII	The 1976 Sabah earthquake resulted in some damage.		
27	China, Hebei	7.5	23.0	XI	This was the deadliest event of the 20th century, and one of the deadliest events of all time. Deadliest event of 1976. The 1976 Tangshan earthquake struck causing devastation to the area. 242,769 people died according to official information. Around 799,000 were hurt. Property damage was extensive with costs reaching $5.6 billion (1976 rate).	242,769	799,000
28	China, Hebei	7.4	26.0	IX	Aftershock resulted in at least 101 more deaths. Many homes collapsed.	101	
28	New Hebrides, Vanuatu	6.0	5.0	VI			
28	Soviet Union, Gorno-Badakhshan Autonomous Region, Tajikistan	6.1	50.0	V			
28	Soviet Union, Chechnya, Russia	6.1	21.0	VII			

=== August ===
August
- Strongest: 8.0 M_{w} Philippines
- Deadliest: 8.0 M_{w} Philippines; 8,000 deaths
- Total fatalities: 8,005

Number by magnitude
- 8.0–8.9: 1
- 7.0–7.9: 0
- 6.0–6.9: 7
- 5.0–5.9: 150
- 4.0–4.9: 214

Date	Country and location	M_{w}	Depth (km)	MMI	Notes	Casualties	
Date	Country and location	M_{w}	Depth (km)	MMI	Notes	Dead	Injured
2	New Hebrides, Vanuatu	6.9	52.0	VI			
12	Burma, Kachin State	6.4	27.0	VI			
16	China, Sichuan	6.9	16.0	VII	1976 Songpan-Pingwu earthquake.		
16	Philippines, off the south coast of Mindanao	8.0	33.0	VIII	Largest event of 1976. The 1976 Moro Gulf earthquake caused extensive destruction mostly through a tsunami which followed the shaking. In total 8,000 people were killed and 10,000 were hurt. Damages of $134 million (1976 rate) were caused.	8,000	10,000
17	Philippines, off the northeast coast of Mindanao	6.0	34.0	V			
17	Philippines, off the south coast of Mindanao	6.8	22.0	IX	The strong aftershock caused at least 1 additional death and further damage.	1	
19	Turkey, Denizli Province	5.0	3.0	VIII	4 people were killed and 50 injured. 1,800 homes were damaged.	4	50
21	China, Sichuan	6.4	33.0	VI	Aftershock of August 16 event.		
23	China, Sichuan	6.7	33.0	VII	Aftershock of August 16 event.		

=== September ===
September
- Strongest: 6.5 M_{w} New Zealand
- Deadliest: 6.0 M_{w} Italy; 11 deaths
- Total fatalities: 16

Number by magnitude
- 8.0–8.9: 0
- 7.0–7.9: 0
- 6.0–6.9: 3
- 5.0–5.9: 156
- 4.0–4.9: 198

Date	Country and location	M_{w}	Depth (km)	MMI	Notes	Casualties	
Date	Country and location	M_{w}	Depth (km)	MMI	Notes	Dead	Injured
11	Italy, Friuli-Venezia Giulia	5.5	16.0	VII	Aftershock of May 6 event. 5 people died and at least 51 were injured. Some damage was caused.	5	51
15	Italy, Friuli-Venezia Giulia	6.0	10.0	IX	Aftershock of May 6 event. Another 11 people were killed and at least 51 were injured. Some damage was caused.	11	51
15	Italy, Friuli-Venezia Giulia	5.9	17.0	IX	Aftershock of May 6 event. At least 51 people were injured and further damage was reported.		51
29	Philippines, Mindanao	6.0	41.0	VI	Aftershock of August 16 event.		
30	New Zealand, Kermadec Islands	6.5	32.0				

=== October ===
October
- Strongest: 7.1 M_{w} Indonesia
- Deadliest: 7.1 M_{w} Indonesia; 133 deaths
- Total fatalities: 133

Number by magnitude
- 8.0–8.9: 0
- 7.0–7.9: 1
- 6.0–6.9: 1
- 5.0–5.9: 126
- 4.0–4.9: 182

Date	Country and location	M_{w}	Depth (km)	MMI	Notes	Casualties	
Date	Country and location	M_{w}	Depth (km)	MMI	Notes	Dead	Injured
12	United Kingdom, Solomon Islands	6.0	106.0	IV			
25	Soviet Union, Estonian Soviet Socialist Republic	4.5	33.0	V	The Osmussaar earthquake is the largest ever recorded in Estonia. Some damage was caused.		
29	Indonesia, Papua (province)	7.1	33.0	VIII	133 deaths were caused. Some homes sustained damage.	133	

=== November ===
November
- Strongest: 7.3 M_{w} Turkey
- Deadliest: 7.3 M_{w} Turkey; 5,000 deaths
- Total fatalities: 5,018

Number by magnitude
- 8.0–8.9: 0
- 7.0–7.9: 1
- 6.0–6.9: 10
- 5.0–5.9: 116
- 4.0–4.9: 159

Date	Country and location	M_{w}	Depth (km)	MMI	Notes	Casualties	
Date	Country and location	M_{w}	Depth (km)	MMI	Notes	Dead	Injured
6	China, Sichuan	6.5	33.0	VII			
7	Iran, South Khorasan province	6.2	13.0	VIII	17 people were killed and major damage was caused.	17	
7	Philippines, Mindanao	6.8	60.0	VII			
8	Japan, off the east coast of Honshu	6.0	38.0				
15	China, Tianjin	6.3	15.0	VII	Aftershock of July 27 event.		
18	United Kingdom, Solomon Islands	6.5	33.0	VI			
18	Indonesia, Papua (province)	6.3	33.0	IX			
22	Philippines, off the south coast of Mindanao	6.0	60.0	IV	Aftershock of August 16 event.		
24	Turkey, Van Province	7.3	36.0	X	The 1976 Çaldıran–Muradiye earthquake caused 5,000 deaths and at least 101 injuries. $60 million (1976 rate) in property destruction was caused.	5,000	101
26	United States, off the coast of northern California	6.3	41.8	V			
27	Afghanistan, Badakhshan Province	6.1	190.0	V	Some damage was reported.		
30	Chile, Tarapaca Region	6.5	82.0	VIII	1 person died with a further 13 injured. Some damage was reported.	1	13

=== December ===
December
- Strongest: 6.7 M_{w} Canada
- Deadliest: 5.2 M_{w} South Africa; 4 deaths
- Total fatalities: 4

Number by magnitude
- 8.0–8.9: 0
- 7.0–7.9: 0
- 6.0–6.9: 1
- 5.0–5.9: 139
- 4.0–4.9: 198

Date	Country and location	M_{w}	Depth (km)	MMI	Notes	Casualties	
Date	Country and location	M_{w}	Depth (km)	MMI	Notes	Dead	Injured
8	South Africa, Orange Free State (province)	5.2	33.0	VII	4 people died and another 36 sustained injuries. Some damage was caused.	4	36
20	Canada, west of Vancouver Island	6.7	10.0				
