= Korean War Memorial Wall =

Korean War Memorial Wall may refer to:

- Korean War Memorial Wall (Canada), the Memorial Wall in Brampton, Ontario, Canada
- Korean War Memorial Wall (U.S.), the Memorial Wall in the Korean War Veterans Memorial, Washington, D.C., United States
