= 1976 Bali earthquake =

Earthquake in Indonesia

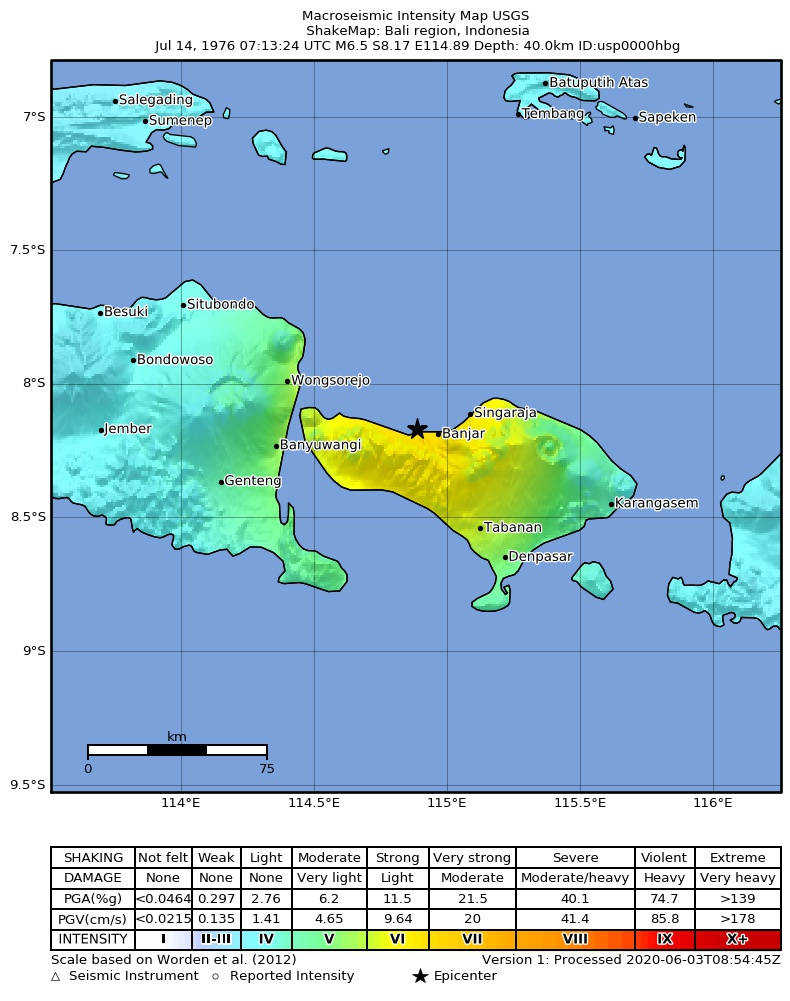
- USGS ShakeMap intensity

- Location within Bali
- UTC time: 1976-07-14 07:13:24
- ISC event: 711163
- USGS-ANSS: ComCat
- Local date: July 14, 1976
- Local time: 15:13
- Magnitude: 6.5 M_{s}
- Depth: 25.4 km (16 mi)
- Epicenter: 8.227°S 114.775°E
- Areas affected: Bali, Indonesia
- Total damage: US$195 million
- Max. intensity: MMI IX (Violent)
- Landslides: Many
- Casualties: 573 killed 4750+ injured

The 1976 Bali earthquake occurred at 15:13 local time on 14 July with a surface-wave magnitude of 6.5. The shock occurred 5 kilometres (3.1 mi) south of the Bali Sea coast of the Buleleng Regency, and about 65 kilometres (40 mi) northwest of Denpasar. Up to ninety percent of houses in Buleleng Regency were seriously damaged or destroyed and the Seririt sub-district was almost completely destroyed, where a school building collapsed and trapped at least 200 students. 573 people are believed to have died; at least 544 in Buleleng Regency, 24 in Jembrana and 5 in Tabanan. Four thousand more suffered injuries and an estimated 450,000 were left temporarily homeless.

== Tectonic setting ==
The island of Bali forms part of the Sunda Arc, which formed above the convergent boundary where the Australian plate is subducting beneath the Sunda plate. The rate of convergence across the line of the Sunda–Java Trench is 7.5 cm per year. Eastwards from Bali, the Sunda Arc is also being thrust over the Bali and Flores back-arc basins on a series of south-dipping thrusts. Focal mechanisms for earthquakes near Bali are dominantly thrust sense on both the subduction interface and the system of thrust faults to the north.

A previous earthquake of 6.6 M_{s} southeast of Bali on 21 January 1917 had caused 1500 casualties on the island. A subsequent earthquake of 6.5 M_{s} southeast of Karangasem Regency on 18 December 1979 caused 27 deaths on the island and displaced a similar number of people as the 1976 event.

== Earthquake ==
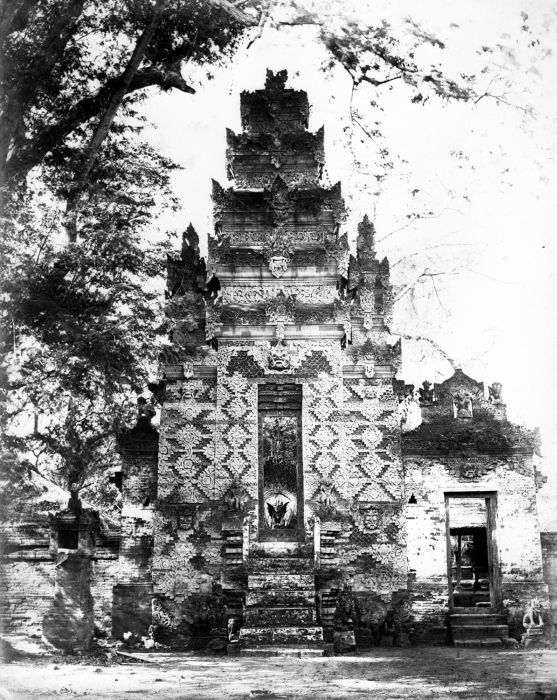
A Hindu temple in Buleleng before 1930.

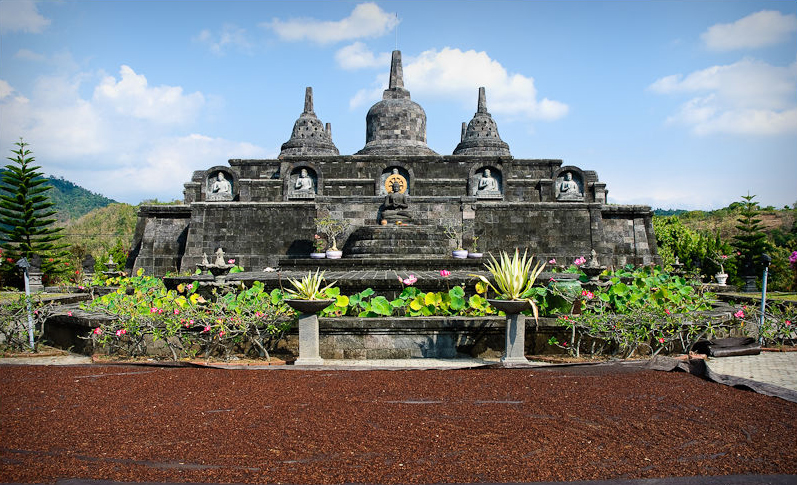
The Braham Arama Vihara Buddhist monastery was heavily damaged and later repaired.

According to the United States Geological Survey (USGS), the 14 July shock occurred 915 km (569 mi) east-southeast of Jakarta at a depth of 25.4 km (15.8 mi) although the hypocenter may actually have been as deep as 40 km (25 mi). The main shock lasted for a duration of nearly a minute. Several fumaroles reportedly formed in the Yeh Kuning sub-district of Jembrana and released sulfurous fumes. The Jakarta Geophysical Service initially believed the epicenter to be in the Bali Strait, some 25 km (16 mi) west of the location observed by the USGS. A subsequent shock of 5.9 M_{s} occurred at 18:23 local time on 14 July a short distance north, although the hypocenter was at a more shallow 16.3 km (10.1 mi).

== Damage ==
According to data from the 1971 census, over nine hundred thousand people resided in the three regencies of the island that suffered significant structural damage and fatalities as a result of the shock; Buleleng, Jembrana and Tabanan. At least 85,500 dwellings and 226 schools were destroyed within the three regencies, in addition to serious damage to 86 government offices, 29 health facilities, 7 markets, and dozens of religious sites. The epicenter was only a few kilometers north of Seririt, a town with a population between forty and fifty thousand people and at that time the 3rd most populous in Bali. Early reports by Reuters described Seririt as being 'flattened' and that '[sic] almost all the buildings in the town and bridges collapsed'.

In the first few days, international media focused in particular on the plight of up to 200 school children who were reportedly trapped by the collapse of a single school building within Seririt town; the bodies of ten children were recovered on the day of the main shock, and another six bodies were reportedly recovered in following days. More than 60 students died in the collapse of this particular school, however the exact name of the school remains unclear.

The only Buddhist monastery in Bali, the Brahma Vihara Arama in Banjar village 4 km (2.5 mi) from Seririt, was severely damaged.

Damage to infrastructure in Busung Biu and other mountainous sub-districts meant that personnel of a Singapore Armed Forces (SAF) Medical Relief mission had to trek into mountain towns by foot, carrying supplies by hand. During the mission, the Singaporean team reportedly experienced three further damaging tremors.

Although Seririt and rural sub-districts of Buleleng were most severely affected, a 60-bed hospital in the town of Negara was also completely destroyed. The Taman Ujung historic site in Karangasem was also extensively damaged, exacerbating damage already caused by earthquakes associated with the volcanic eruption of Mount Agung in 1963. It was felt in the Kuta and Denpasar areas, but only minor damage resulted.

== Relief effort ==
Indonesian Red Cross and Red Crescent (IRCS) and local government joint relief activity, led by the governor of Bali and operated from a provincial relief control center, largely met the emergency needs of the victims within four days. In-country contributions, both in cash and in kind, amounted to more than US$900,000.

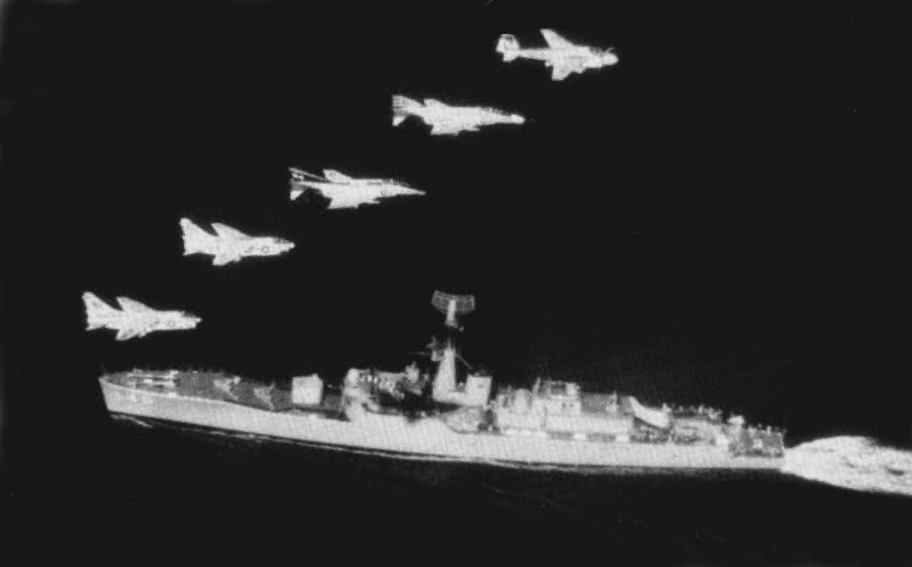
HMAS Parramatta in 1974

The armed forces of two nations, Australia and Singapore, dispatched direct humanitarian relief missions in response to damage caused by the temblor.

The Australian Embassy in Jakarta dispatched a team to Bali, including a consular official, to determine whether any Australian tourists were killed or injured. The team included an aid official to determine Australian aid requirements.

On 17 July, the Australian destroyer escort HMAS Parramatta was diverted to the affected region from its planned destination, Singapore, to assist with medical personnel and stores, and to provide food and trained personnel. On the same day, the Australian Minister for Foreign Affairs announced the donation of A$35,000 to the Government of Indonesia for use in assisting victims of the Balinese and Irian Jayan events. At least 250 Royal Australian Navy personnel provided assistance to victims within Seririt sub-district, including fixing electrical infrastructure and restoring power to the damaged town. Two first aid posts were also established in neighboring villages and 150 were treated.

On 19 July, the Ambassador of the United States to Indonesia exercised his disaster relief authority and purchased $6,000 worth of lanterns and sleep mats for distribution by Cooperative for Assistance and Relief Everywhere (CARE).

On 22 July, the Government of Indonesia passed a request to the United States for blankets, tents, and cots. The Office of U.S. Foreign Disaster Assistance created a fund worth over $200,000 to provide 1,000 blankets, 570 tents, and 310 cots to the Balinese relief effort from its stockpile in Singapore. USAID also co-financed a $240,000 grant to CARE to assist in the reconstruction of one thousand low cost houses in the following months.

On 27 July, a SAF Medical Relief mission of 20 personnel arrived in Bali with 3,500 kg (7,700 lb) of medical supplies and equipment. The team worked alongside medical teams from the IRCS and the University of Bandang and Diponegoro. Before returning to Singapore on 15 August, the SAF mission provided medical consultation, treatment and immunization to over three thousand victims.

Recorded deaths by date (Source: Disaster in Bali caused by Earthquake, 1976)
Date	Buleleng	Jembrana	Tabanan	Total
14 July	–	8	–	8
16 July	200	20	3	223
17 July	416	21	4	441
19 July	513	–	–	513
20 July	532	23	–	555
23 July	544	–	–	544
26 July	544	24	5	573

== See also ==
- List of earthquakes in 1976
- List of earthquakes in Indonesia
