= 1976 Tangshan earthquake =

Mw 7.6 earthquake in Hebei, China

- 唐山大地震
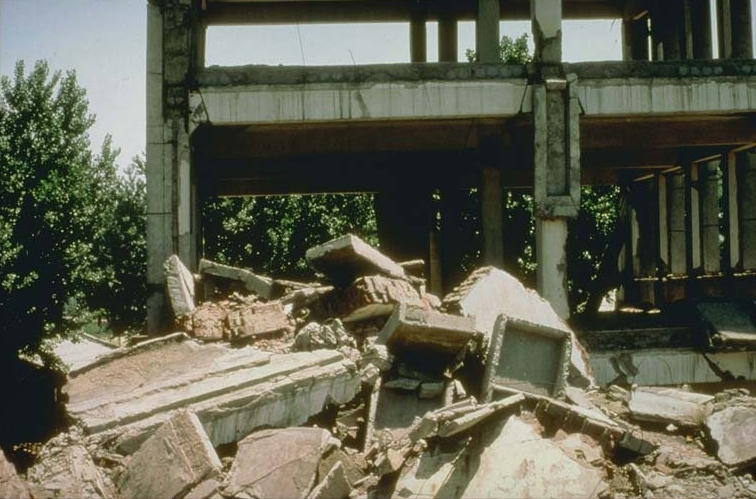

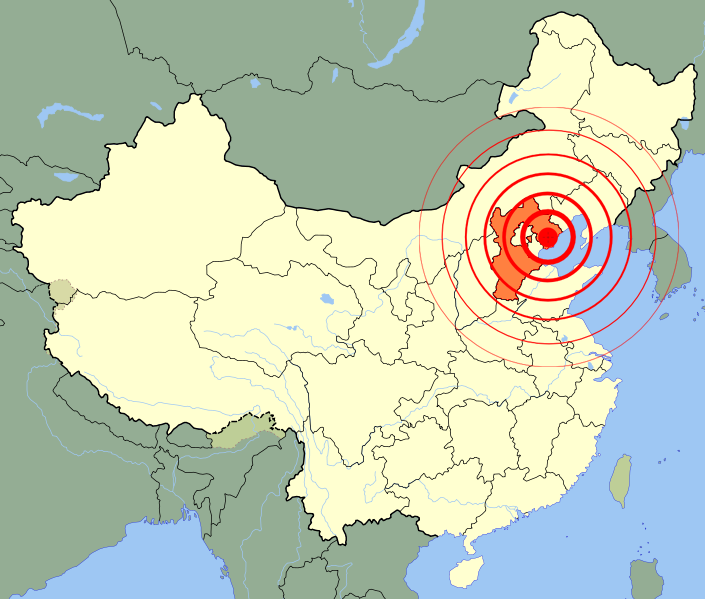
- UTC time: Doublet earthquake: A: 1976-07-27 19:42:55; B: 1976-07-28 10:45:36
- ISC event: A: 711732; B: 711773
- USGS-ANSS: A: ComCat; B: ComCat
- Local date: 28 July 1976
- Local time: Peking time: A: 03:42:55; B: 18:45:36
- Magnitude: A: 7.6 M_{w}; 7.6 M_{s}; B: 7.0 M_{w}; 7.4 M_{s}
- Depth: A: 12.2 km B: 16.7 km
- Epicenter: 39.63°N 118.10°E 39.72°N 118.44°E
- Areas affected: Hebei, People's Republic of China
- Total damage: CNY 10 billion
- Max. intensity: MMI XI (Extreme)
- Casualties: 242,469 dead (Note: See the table on #Death toll)

The 1976 Tangshan earthquake (Chinese: 唐山大地震; pinyin: Tángshān dà dìzhèn; lit. 'Great Tangshan earthquake (Note: Also known as "Great Tangshan earthquake" in English sources, e.g. the voluminous work edited by Housner & He (2002).)') occurred at 19:42:55 UTC on 27 July (03:42:55, 28 July local time). The maximum intensity of the M_{w} 7.6 earthquake around Tangshan, Hebei, China, was XI (Extreme) on the Mercalli scale. In minutes, 85 percent of the buildings in Tangshan collapsed or were rendered unusable, all services failed, and most of the highway and railway bridges collapsed or were seriously damaged. The official count stated 242,469 deaths, while historians accepted at least 300,000 died, making it the deadliest earthquake in recorded history (excluding the famine deaths from the 1556 Shaanxi earthquake) and one of the worst disasters in China by death toll.

== Tectonic setting ==
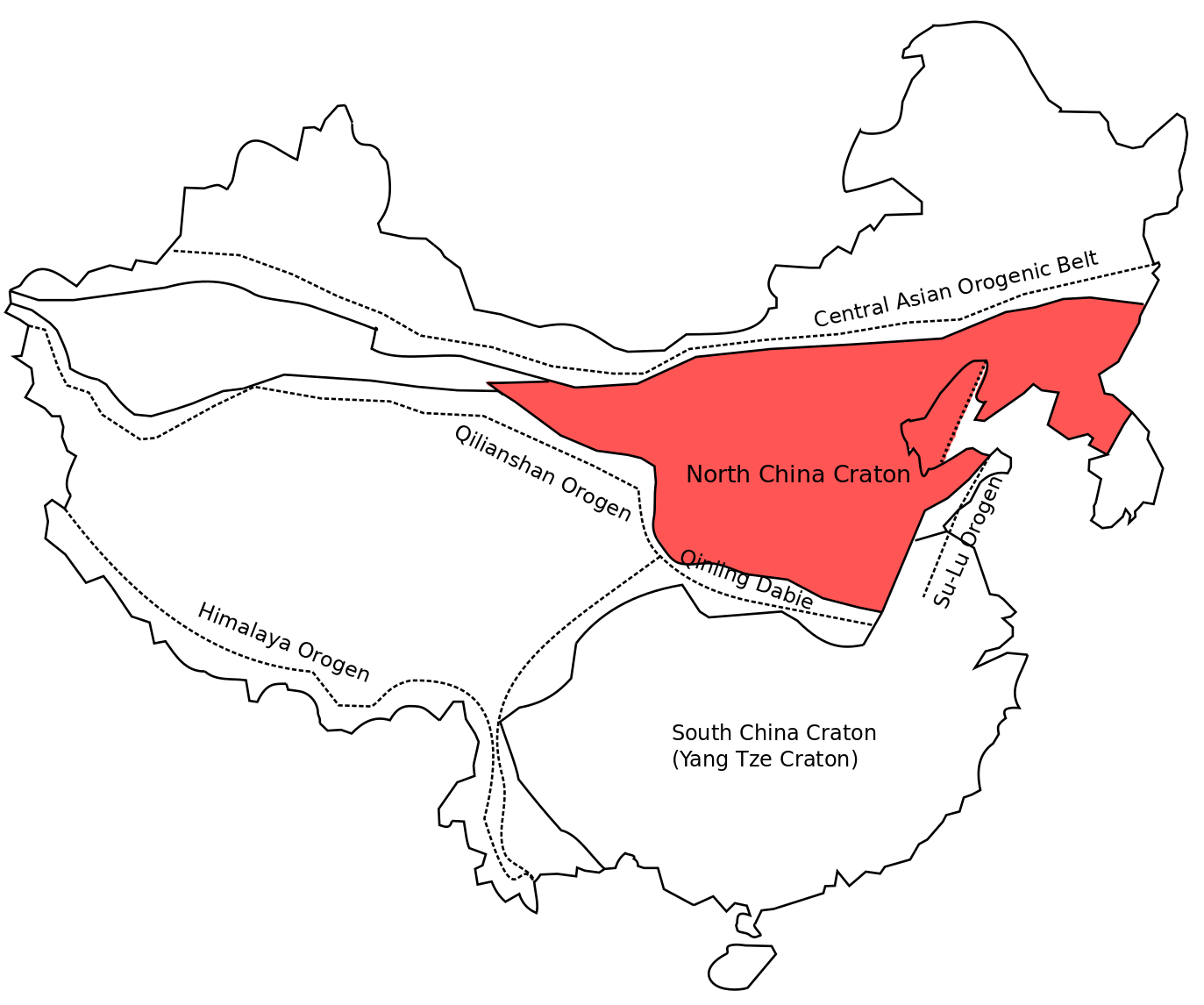
Tectonic elements surrounding the North China Craton on which Tangshan lies.

Tangshan lies at the northern edge of the Beijing-Tianjin-Tangshan Plain, an alluvial plain that stretches from Beijing to the Sea of Bohai. This plain – the northeastern corner of the great North China Plain – is where sediments eroded from the Yanshan mountains to the north have filled in the ancient Sea of Bohai, with Tangshan near where the shore was about 4,000 years ago. To the south these sediments have formed a layer of weak soils as much as 3 kilometres (1.9 mi) thick. At Tangshan and northward these sediments are thinner where the underlying strata crops out to form isolated hills. This underlying strata is a thick —typically 10 kilometres (6.2 mi) — layer of mainly sedimentary strata such as limestone and sandstone, with large deposits of coal. Tangshan is located particularly over a northeast oriented syncline, a fold in the sedimentary strata that has brought massive deposits of coal close enough to the surface to be mined. In this area the overlying alluvium varies in thickness from several meters to around 600 metres (2,000 ft).

Underlying all this is the ancient bedrock of different kinds of metamorphic rock (such as schist, gneiss, quartzite, granulite, etc.) that form the Eastern Block of the North China Craton. This craton (see figure) was formed approximately two billion years ago by the collision of two major crustal blocks that left a belt of uplifted mountains – the Central (China) Orogenic Belt (COB) – that crosses China approximately southwest to northeast, passing just west and north of Beijing. Just north of Zunhua another orogenic belt, the east–west trending Yanshan mountain fault-fold belt (also known as the Yanshan seismic belt) marks the northern edge of the North China Craton (and of the alluvial plain). It is also the location of over half of the destructive earthquakes in Hebei province, as under the plain several fault zones (oriented parallel to the Central Orogenic Belt) terminate against the Yanshan mountains.

Many of these faults are ancient, but have been reactivated by the force transmitted from the collision of the Indian plate against the Eurasian plate, making the Eastern Block unusually active seismically, accounting for six of the ten deadliest earthquakes in recorded history.

The Tangshan fault that ruptured 28 July runs right under the center of Tangshan City. One of three faults in the Changdong fault zone, it runs approximately east-northeast about 36 kilometres (22 mi) to where it terminates against the north–south trending fault where, just to the south, the secondary M 7.1 quake occurred ("B" on the 'shaking' map). The southern end of the Tangshan fault (it bends slightly at Tangshan) is near Ninghe, which was also the site of a M 6.2 earthquake several hours after the main shock, and an M 6.9 quake ("C") the following November. The Tangshan fault is considered shallow, but corresponds with a deeper and younger fault with somewhat differing characteristics.

== Earthquakes ==
USGS ShakeMaps of the M7.5 and M7.4 events
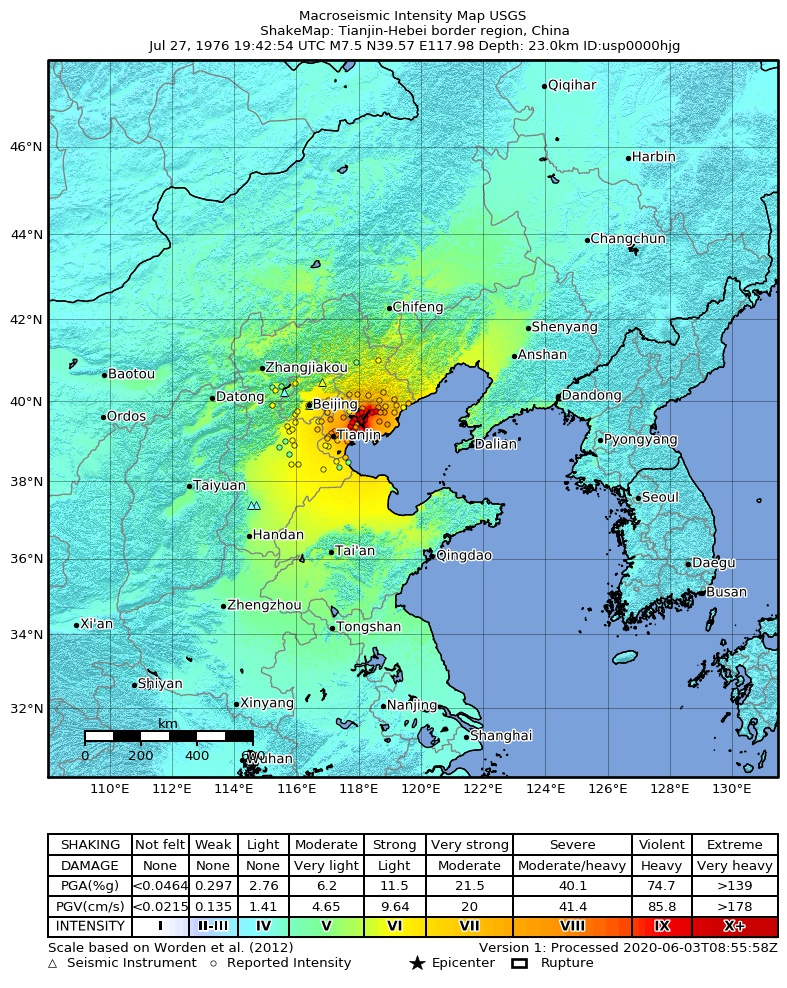
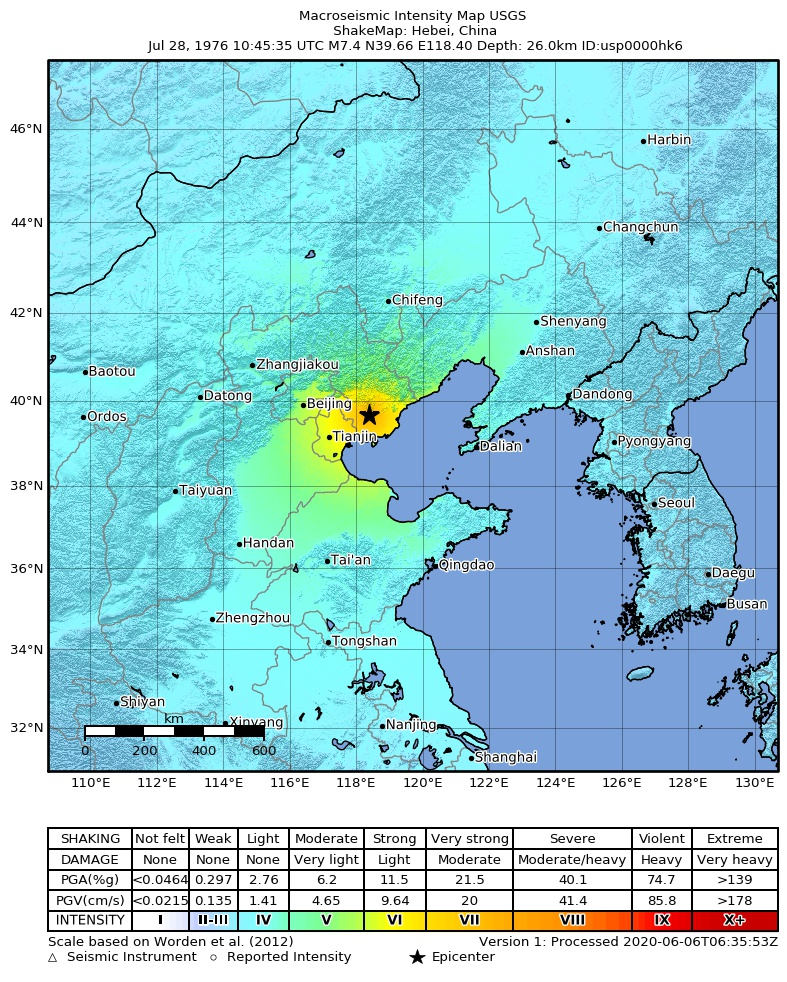

The earthquake sequence comprised two shocks with magnitudes of at least 7.0. The first struck at 3:42:55 in the morning (local time), approximately 12 kilometres (7.5 mi) under the southern part of Tangshan. The magnitude was initially estimated at 8.1, subsequently recalculated to be 7.6 on the standard M_{w} scale. However, that scale measures only the total energy released by an earthquake, and earthquakes vary in how much of that energy is converted to seismic shaking. The Tangshan quake, being relatively shallow, converted much of its energy to surface shaking, and on the M_{s} (surface magnitude) scale it also measured 7.6, and 7.8 on the Chinese surface magnitude scale. This shock ruptured along a vertically dipping, northeast trending right-lateral strike-slip fault. Based on the location of the aftershocks, the rupture initiated from the epicenter and extended outwards along the fault for 140 km (87 mi). The crust on the southeast side of the fault was displaced by about 3 metres (9.8 ft) to the southwest. This resulted from tectonic compression on a nearly west–east axis. Surface rupturing occurred in five en echelon segments extending 8 kilometres (5 mi) through the center of Tangshan.

The second main shock, with a magnitude 7.0 M_{w}, or 7.4 M_{s}, struck that afternoon at 18:45:36 near Luanxian, about 70 kilometres (43 mi) to the east-northeast ("B" on the intensity map in the next section), just south of the northeastern end of the Tangshan fault. This occurred in a zone of north-northwest striking conjugate faults that cut across the north end of the Tangshan fault. The left-lateral motion here, along with the right-lateral motion on the Tangshan fault, suggests that as the crustal blocks to the west and east are compressed together the block between these two earthquakes is being squeezed out to the south.

=== Aftershocks ===
A long sequence of aftershocks followed, with twelve of magnitude 6 or greater. The first of these struck just three and a half hours after the initial shock, at 7:17, at the southern end of Tangshan fault, near Ninghe ("C" on the map in the section below), with a magnitude of 6.2 M_{s}. Another significant aftershock (M_{s} 6.9) occurred in November near Ninghe. Most aftershocks occurred between these end points, in a zone 140 kilometres (87 mi) long and about 50 kilometres (31 mi) wide. Many buildings were further damaged by the aftershocks.

The aftershock zone remains seismically active in the twenty-first century. Earthquakes measuring 4.5 M_{s}to 4.7 M_{s}occurred in 2012, 2016, and 2019. On 12 July 2020, a 5.1 M_{s}strike-slip earthquake struck the northern part of the Tangshan Fault. It produced its own sequence of aftershocks that ended on 17 July 2020. The earthquake caused only minor damage to buildings in Tangshan. Its occurrence stirred a debate among scientists into whether the recent earthquakes are aftershocks of the 1976 event or are background seismicity.

== Damage ==
Extent of significant shaking
Approximate extent of different intensities of shaking (isoseismals). Heaviest damage was within the dark brown line (intensity VII and greater). Diamonds locate the two principal shocks (A and B), and the area of several M > 6 aftershocks near Ninghe (C).

The damage done by an earthquake depends primarily on two factors. First, the intensity of shaking, which depends mainly on the magnitude of the earthquake rupture, the distance from the epicenter, and the nature of the local soil and topography, with soft soils (e.g., sediments and fill) more likely to amplify the intensity and duration of the shaking. Second, the design and construction of the structures being shaken, with houses built of adobe or stone, wooden houses without a well-built frame, and unreinforced masonry construction being especially vulnerable. The seismic risk had been greatly underestimated and almost all buildings and structures were designed and built without seismic considerations. As a result, Tangshan was "mainly a city of unreinforced brick buildings", sitting right on top of a major fault line.

The power (magnitude) of the Tangshan earthquake is indicated by the extent of where it was felt: up to 1,100 km (680 miles) away, across most of northeastern China, and even in Mongolia and Korea. In and around Beijing, 140 km (87 miles) from the epicenter, the shaking reached an intensity of VI on the Chinese intensity scale (similar to the Modified Mercalli Intensity Scale), with nearly 10% of all buildings damaged, and at least 50 fatalities.

The economic loss totaled to 10 billion yuan.

=== Intensity XI and X zone ===
The rupture occurred under the southern part of the city, and propagated northeastward on a fault that runs through the middle of the city. The maximum intensity was "XI" (eleven) on the 12-degree Chinese scale. Nearly every building and structure in the city collapsed, wholly or partially, infrastructure was severely damaged, and essential services, such as electric power, water supply, and communications, were entirely knocked out. This area of maximum damage – the meizoseismal area – was approximately 10.5 kilometres (6.5 mi) long and from 3.5 to 5.5 kilometres (2.2 to 3.4 mi) wide, centered roughly along the railway.

The area of intensity X shaking – where only new, one-story brick buildings were merely "damaged or slightly damaged", the rest being severely damaged or worse – was 36 kilometres (22 mi) long and 15 kilometres (9.3 mi) across. In this "high intensity" zone (intensity X and XI, within the red contour on the map) 20 highway bridges and five railway bridges cross the Douhe River in Tangshan; only six survived with only minor damage.

=== Intensity IX and VIII zone ===
Shaking of intensity IX (or greater) occurred in a zone roughly 78 km (48 mi) long and 42 km (26 mi) — about 1,800 square kilometres (695 sq mi) wide, inner orange contour on the map – and also around the aftershocks at Luanxian and Ninghe. In this zone most buildings classified as Class III (well-built buildings of wood, masonry, or reinforced concrete) survived, but many Class II buildings (typically old wood-frame buildings lacking a well-built frame, and quite common outside of the cities) were destroyed, while a majority of Class I buildings (built of adobe or stone) were destroyed.

Further out (to the outer orange contour), and around the city of Tianjin and a few isolated patches, intensity VIII shaking mostly affected Class I buildings (more than half destroyed), bridges, and tall brick chimneys. Railway track was also subject to bending or displacement, depending on soil conditions.

=== Intensity VII zone ===
The zone of intensity VII shaking – inside the dark brown contour – marks the extent of moderate damage, where many Class I structures (of weak design or construction) were damaged but only "few"—between 10% and 30%—were destroyed, and only a "few" Class two buildings damaged. This ellipsoid zone extended about 75 kilometres (47 mi) north and south of Tangshan and 120 kilometres (75 mi) east and west, from about 25 kilometres (16 mi) short of Beijing to short of Qinhuangdao City (which had anomalously higher shaking), and from the Sea of Bohai in the south and southwest to just north of Zunhua. The north–south shortening of this zone is attributed to buttressing by the bedrock of the Yanshin mountains.

Significant damage occurred beyond this in the VI zone, but (like in Beijing) affected less than 10% of the buildings, or occurred in small localized areas.

=== Coal mines ===
Mining coal is Tangshan's principal industry; when the quake struck, around 10,000 miners were underground. For the most part, the mine roadways (tunnels) were not seriously damaged, but with the loss of electrical power there were no illumination (aside from headlamps), no ventilation, and no working lifts. It is reported that most miners escaped within hours, but that some others took two weeks to reach the surface.

Most of the damage to the vertical shafts occurred within the first 50 metres (164 ft) where they pass through the water-bearing alluvium. In many cases the concrete liner built to keep out the water cracked (particularly where not built properly), allowing a much greater inflow of water. Coupled with damage to the underground drainage system and lack of power to drive the pumps, many of the various mines flooded.

Some electrical power to the mines was restored in three days, and some coal production resumed within ten days. However, de-watering, overhauling of flooded electrical equipment, and rebuilding of surface buildings and structures continued for a year and a half; the pre-earthquake level of production was not reached until the end of 1977.

=== Railways ===
The Beijing–Shanhaiguan Railway (built in 1887) is a double-track Class I trunk line that runs from Beijing southeast to Tianjin and Tanggu, then turns northeast to cross the Yongdingxin River and its estuary to run to Ninghe and then Tangshan. From Tangshan it continues northeast and then east to Chengli, and then to Qinhuangdao and Shanhaiguan. This is the principal connection of Beijing, Tianjin, and Tangshan to the seaports, and to Northeast China. The Tongxian to Tuozitou (within modern-day Luan County) Railway (built in 1976) is a single-track Class I trunk line that runs east from the eastern outskirts of Beijing to where it meets the Beijing to Shanhaiguan line northeast of Tangshan (near the epicenter of the M 7.1 quake). All of this was built "with no consideration for earthquake resistant design", although some "earthquake resistance measures" for large and medium bridges were applied following the 1975 Haicheng earthquake.

These transport routes (and other railways and branch lines) were seriously damaged by the earthquakes, mainly in the areas of intensity IX or greater shaking. (This includes a large area around Tangshan quake, and areas around Ninghe and Luanxian following the M 6.9 and M 7.4 aftershocks.) At the time of the main quake there were 28 freight trains and seven passenger trains traveling on the Beijing–Shanhaiguan line in the affected area; seven freight trains and two passenger trains derailed due to derangement of the rails, mostly south of Tangshan where the line was built on loose alluvium, diluvium, and occasional stretches of loose sand. In many of these cases – and also similar cases northeast of Tangshan, and on the Tongxian–Tuozitou line east of Fengrun – the railway embankment slumped due to weak soils. In other cases the embankment held, but transverse compression of the rails caused them to buckle.

Railway operations were further impaired by the loss of communications (including signalling) and water supply (for the steam locomotives), in both cases due mainly to collapse of buildings and loss of electrical power. However, the most serious damage, taking the most manpower and longest time to repair, was that involving bridges. Most difficult was where soft or liquefied soil allowed the bank to slide into the river, shifting the abutments. A more frequent problem was where an approach embankment subsided, typically leaving the rails suspended from the abutment. There were numerous cases where concrete piers and abutments were damaged due to inadequate design and construction; bridges that were strengthened following the Haicheng earthquake survived with only slight damage.

It was observed that at intensity VII and above damage to the roadbed was correlated mainly with loose soil and a high water table. Conversely, bridges and rails in Tangshan City, built on dense soil with a deep water table, were largely undamaged even though subject to intensity XI shaking.

Over forty-two thousand people were mobilized to quickly effect emergency repair of the railways. The Tongxian-Tuozitou line was opened for traffic on 3 August, single track of the Beijing-Shanhaiguan line opened on 7 August, and both tracks on 10 August, albeit at restricted speeds over temporary bridges and at other places where repairs were not yet complete.

== Death toll ==
=== Various official data ===
Official figures (Note: Unless footnoted, this table is taken from Guo 2008, pp. 408–410.)
Locality	Deaths	Injuries	
Locality	Deaths	Severe	Minor
Tangshan "City" (Note: In 1976, the Tangshan county-level "city" spanned 1,090 km² (420 sq mi). Only 66 km² (25 sq mi) of which were downtown Tangshan (Lubei and Lunan Districts), the remaining 1,024 km² were suburbs (Jiao and Dongkuang Districts). Among the city's 1,061,926 population, roughly 730,000 lived downtown and 330,000 lived in the suburbs. The districts' border changed after 1982.)	(Note: The Tangshan City deaths is sometimes split as "135,919 residents (with local hukou) and 12,103 non-residents, which summed up to 148,022. Some sources mistakenly claim the city deaths to be 135,919 without realizing this number only count the city residents. The 12,103 city non-resident deaths is often inflated as 12,248, which include the 145 non-residents deaths in Tangshan Prefecture.)148,022	103,919	257,384
Tangshan Prefecture (Note: After administrative changes in 1982, then Tangshan prefecture (唐山地区) corresponds to modern Qinhuangdao and the far rural counties of Tangshan. The prefecture's 5,953,740 population spanned across 12 counties, a county-level city (Qinhuangdao) and a county-level farming district. Tangshan City and Prefecture had a combined population of 7,015,666.)	(Note: The Tangshan Prefecture deaths can be split as "69,065 residents (with local hukou) and 145 non-residents", which summed up to 69,210.)69,210	63,620	284,079
Tianjin Municipality	24,398	(Note: "167,539" is a commonly cited severely injured figure but it only counted those in Tangshan City and Prefecture. The total number including Tianjin and rest of Hebei Province is 175,797.)8,262	?
Rest of Hebei (Note: Most casualties in Hebei outside Tangshan prefecture (modern Tangshan and modern Qinhuangdao) were in Langfang and Cangzhou.)	839	8,262	?
Total	(Note: "242,769" and "242,419" are two alternative number of total deaths commonly cited. However, most sources citing the above numbers do not breakdown the total deaths by locality and do not have data on minor injuries. Only a few sources, like Guo 2008, pp. 408–410, provide a breakdown. Guo (2008)'s figure is 242,469.)242,469	175,797	541,463

While the officially published death toll was 242,469 (see table on the right for a breakdown), historians determined at least 300,000 died after cross-checking the government files.

Discrepancies identified by historians include: first, an internal Tangshan government report dated 22 September 1976 found 263,299 deaths nationally, including 191,300 in Tangshan City and 69,654 in Tangshan Prefecture. Second, the same internal report found 17,599 Tangshan people missing but the official count atypically does not mention the missing and never explain if the missing people were listed as deaths, injuries or not listed. Third, 100,000 severely injured Tangshan patients were transferred out but 12,000 of them did not return to Tangshan, some possibly died. Fourth, among the 175,797 severely injured, some died soon after and not tracked down. Fifth, deaths in army (158 disclosed) and air force (522 disclosed) facilities only went public many years later and the national deaths toll compiled before that possibly exclude military deaths. Historians add up these data to at least 300,000 deaths.

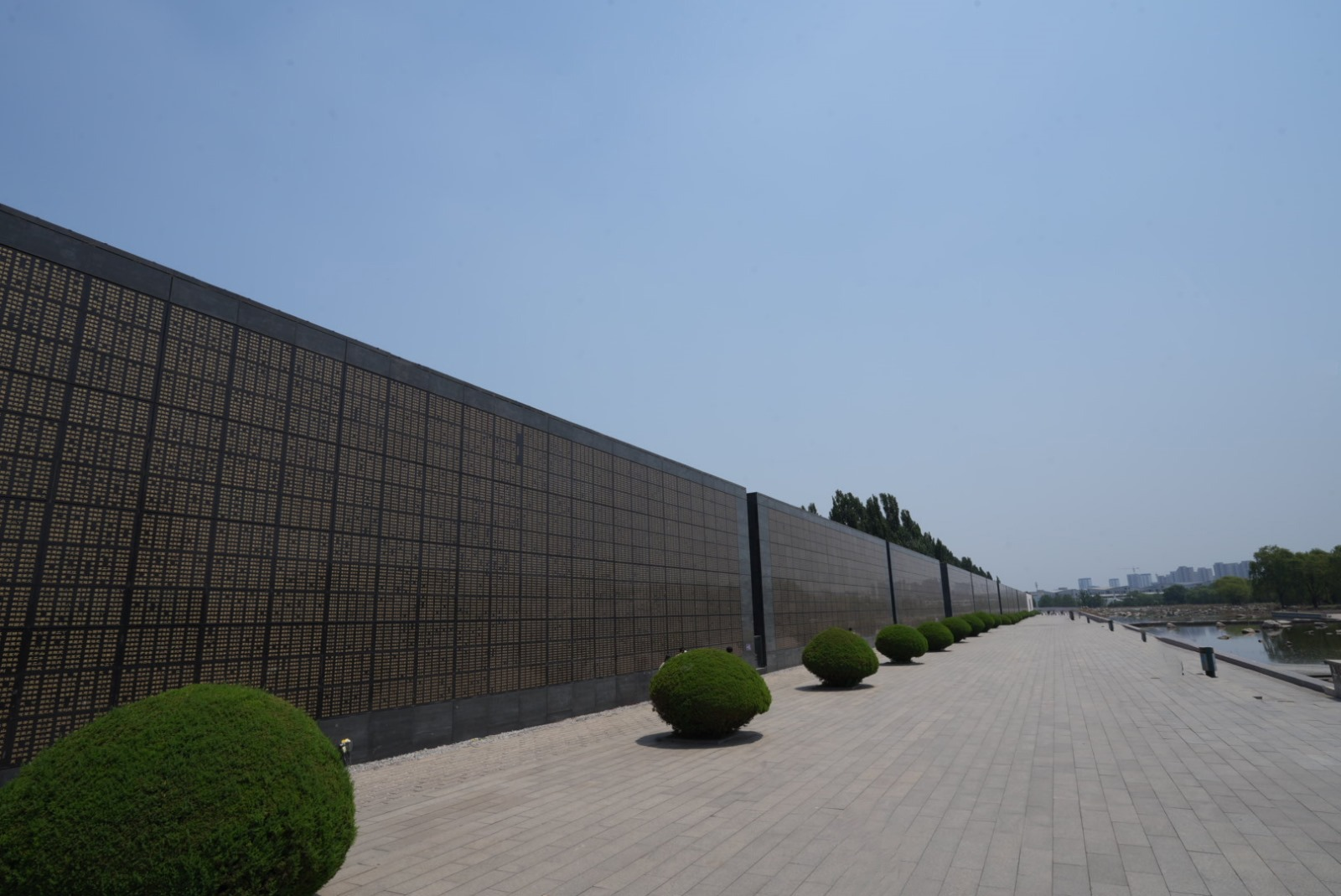
Tangshan Earthquake Memorial Park memorial wall

An alternative official death toll 246,465 appeared on the Tangshan Earthquake Memorial Wall, which had all their names inscribed. There were five major addition of names, in 1992, 2008, 2010 and 2017. While 246,465 never appeared on any publications authored by the China Earthquake Administration (CEA), the additional names were verified by the memorial park, which is headed by officials of the Tangshan branch of CEA.

=== Early foreign estimates ===
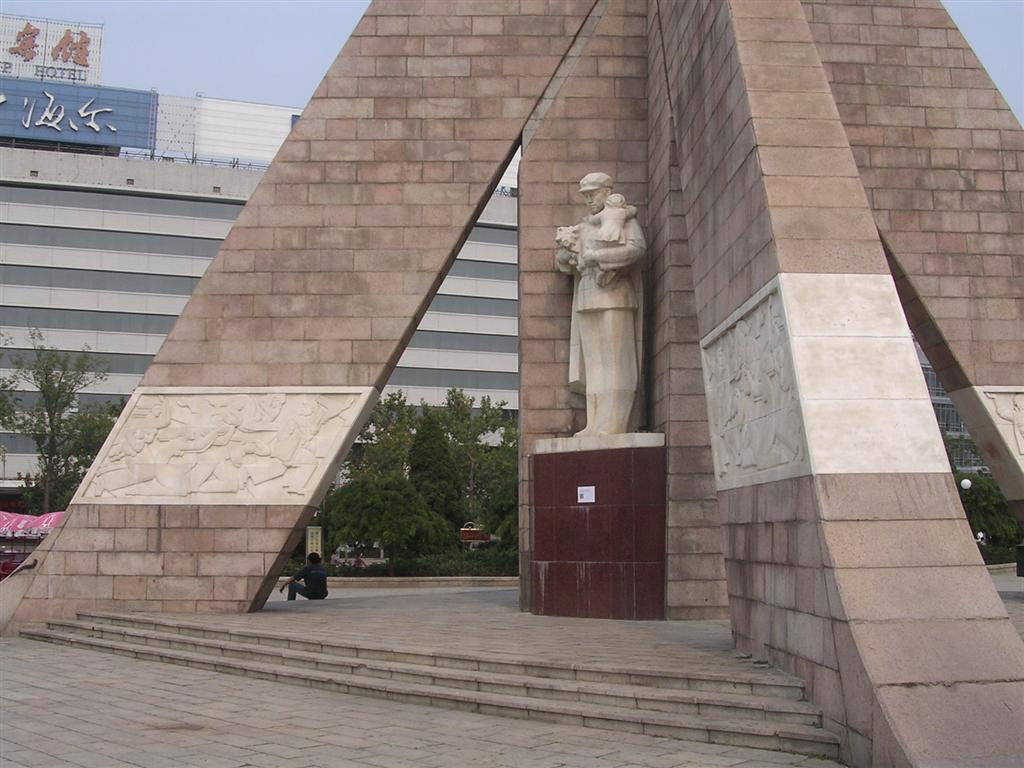
A Tangshan earthquake memorial in Tianjin

The first public release of official figures came in November 1979, three years after the earthquake. During the three-year wait, many high-end foreign estimates gained media popularity.

Within days, Pararas-Carayannis, an oceanographer in charge of IOC's International Tsunami Information Center, gave UPI an estimate of 700,000 to 750,000 deaths. Initially, he said his basis was the Shaanxi earthquake in 1556, which he said to have similar magnitude and similar construction standards, i.e. yaodong caves. However, there were no yaodong caves in Tangshan. Later, he said the population density and the 93% destruction rate of residential buildings in downtown Tangshan (where 730,000 people resided) justify an estimate of 655,000 to 779,000 dead.

In August 1976, Taiwan's Military Intelligence Bureau quoted their agents in China had learnt the death toll was over 100,000, with about 900,000 injured.

On 5 January 1977, Taiwan intelligence claimed they obtained a document dated 6 August 1976, nine days after the earthquake, that found 655,237 dead and 79,000 injured. The alleged document was conference materials prepared by Hebei provincial agencies for the third batch of armed police who were standing by reinforcement orders. Scholars found 655,237 to be a "suspiciously accurate figure" just 9 days after the earthquake.

== Political aspects ==
The remarkably low death toll of the Haicheng earthquake the previous year – initially said to be fewer than 300, much later estimated at a still very modest 2,041– had been credited to measures taken in response to an accurate and timely prediction. This was touted as demonstrating the validity of the Chinese methods of earthquake prediction inspired by Marxism-Leninism-Mao Tze-tung thought and "the superiority of [China's] socialist system".

Many residents initially mistook the earthquake for a Soviet nuclear attack. With China in the midst of the Cultural Revolution, "belief in earthquake prediction was made an element of ideological orthodoxy that distinguished the true party liners from right wing deviationists", and it was everyone's duty to criticize those who doubted the feasibility of earthquake prediction.

As a backdrop to this, and of deep concern to the Chinese Communist Party, was a collectively recognized but unvoiced awareness that in traditional Chinese belief, natural disasters are considered disruptions in the natural order of heaven and may signify the current government's loss of the mandate of heaven. This view was underlined by a magnitude 6.7 earthquake in southwestern China just three weeks later. On the other hand, an ongoing mass education campaign before the quake showed that the government was aware and concerned, and the prompt and massive response following the quake demonstrated the government's competence to alleviate suffering and restore normal production, drawing on resources from across the state. Some have contrasted this with the comparative lack of assistance the hardships faced by disaster victims (especially the poor) under previous regimes.

Mao Zedong was already ailing at the time of the earthquake; he died only six weeks later on 9 September 1976, ushering the downfall of the Gang of Four and bringing the Cultural Revolution to an end.

== Question of prediction ==
Whether the Tangshan earthquake was predicted has had considerable political as well as seismological significance.

The 1975 Haicheng earthquake (about 400 km [250 miles] northeast of Tangshan) is regarded by seismologists as the only successful prediction of a major earthquake, although no mechanism has been proposed to explain this prediction, and no successful predictions have been achieved since. The surprisingly light death toll – initial reports were of "very few people killed", but later determined to be a modest 2,041—for this magnitude M_{s} 7.5 quake, attributed to the precautionary measures taken following a definite short-term prediction, was proclaimed as a demonstration of the superiority of China's socialist system, and incidentally a validation of the Chinese methodologies. However, it was later determined that the most important factor in anticipating the Haicheng earthquake was the extended series of significant foreshocks ("powerful messages from nature"), and the low casualty rate was due largely to the time of day, hitting in the early evening when most people were neither at work nor asleep.

Tangshan was not so fortunate. Seventeen months later the 242,419 fatalities of the similarly sized Tangshan earthquake were therefore a considerable shock politically as well as seismically. While some of this greater mortality might be attributed to the exposure of a larger population, or the time of day (Haicheng was struck in the early evening, Tangshan while most people were asleep), the principal factor appeared to be the failure to take any precautionary measures: Tangshan was entirely unprepared.

At the time, the Chinese methods of earthquake prediction mainly consisted of watching for various precursors, including foreshocks, and were celebrated for their success at Haicheng and elsewhere. Many seismologists consider the Tangshan earthquakes to have not been predicted, even "famously unpredicted", and that it was not predictable due to a lack of precursory anomalous phenomena. Furthermore, an investigation 30 years later found that there was no official short-term prediction of an imminent earthquake at Haicheng, and that, though there were many unofficial predictions of an imminent quake, none of those had a scientific basis. The warnings that were made and precautions taken happened largely at the local level, based on general middle-term predictions, enhanced public awareness due to an educational campaign, and a series of foreshocks. It is significant that at Tangshan there were no perceptible foreshocks.

On the other hand, it is reported that several people at the State Seismological Bureau (SSB) wanted to warn of an impending earthquake somewhere in the region between Beijing and the Bohai Sea, and that this was discussed at several meetings. One of these was a week-long national conference on earthquake predictions and preparation that convened in Tangshan on 14 July (two weeks before the earthquake) where Wang Chengmin is said to have warned there could be a magnitude 5+ earthquake in the Tangshan—Luanxian area between 22 July and 5 August. However, in addition to the distractions of the Cultural Revolution, there was a possible disagreement within the SSB on whether the next large earthquake would be in eastern China (e.g. the Beijing area) or western China, and that in May it had been concluded that no major earthquakes would occur in the Beijing–Tangshan area. As it turned out, western China was hit by the magnitude 7.2 Songpan-Pingwu earthquake only three weeks after Tangshan, showing that those arguing for the imminence of an earthquake in Western China were not entirely wrong.

At another meeting, on 26 July, there was a purported suggestion to not issue any warning, to avoid alarming the population. The next morning, at an emergency meeting he requested with the Bureau's leadership, Wang was reportedly told by Deputy Chief Cha Zhiyuan that "We are currently very busy. We will discuss it again next week." However, Cha has disputed this, claiming that Wang said there would be no major earthquakes. Another account says Wang was directed to submit more information, then send a small group to observe the earthquake.

Some of the bureaucratic reticence to issue warnings and order precautionary measures likely resulted from too many predictions. These were often based on doubtful theories notorious for false alarms that earthquakes can be predicted on the basis of droughts, daily temperatures, variations in geomagnetism, or isolated anomalous phenomena. They were often too broad (magnitude "of at least 4.0 in the area of Beijing, Tianjin, Huailai, Tangshan, Bohai, and Zhangjiakou", "in a few years") to warrant large-scale societal and economic disruption. Such disruptions could be serious: a false alarm in October 1976, issued by the Shaanxi provincial government, is estimated to have disrupted the lives of 65% of the population of that province for half a year. It has also been estimated that "in the fall of 1976 about 400 million of the then total population of 930 million of China spent some nights in temporary earthquake shelters." This illustrates the classic dilemma of earthquake prediction: increasing the sensitivity to the possibility of an earthquake (i.e., reducing the failure to predict) increases the number of false alarms, which often has a significant cost.

== Cultural references ==
Chinese director Feng Xiaogang's 2010 drama film Aftershock depicted how a family led their lives after the earthquake.

Footage of the incident appeared in the film Days of Fury (1979), directed by Fred Warshofsky and hosted by Vincent Price.

Accounts from earthquake victims are presented in the book The Good Women of China (2002), written by the Chinese author Xue Xinran.

Chinese director Chen Chang's 2026 drama Love Story in the 1970s (2026) depicts from episode #1.22 the impact on population from a newspaper reporter's and a surgeon's points of view, with some archival footage.

== See also ==
- List of earthquakes in China
- List of disasters in China by death toll
- List of earthquakes in 1976
- Tangshan Earthquake Memorial Park

== Sources ==
- ANSS, "Sichuan 1976", Comprehensive Catalog, U.S. Geological Survey
- Bo, Zhiyue (2010), "Chapter 7, Sichuan Earthquake", China's Elite Politics: Governance and Democratization, Series on Contemporary China, vol. 19, ISBN 978-981-283-672-4.
- Butler, Rhett; Stewart, Gordon S.; Kanamori, Hiroo (February 1979), "The July 27, 1976 Tangshan, China earthquake—A complex sequence of intraplate events" (PDF), Bulletin of the Seismological Society of America, 69 (1): 207–220, Bibcode:1979BuSSA..69..207B, doi:10.1785/BSSA0690010207, S2CID 140609618.
- Cha, Chi-Yuan (August 1976), "General Conditions of Earthquake Studies and Actions in China" (PDF), in Muller, Paul M. (ed.), Proceedings of Lectures by the Seismological Delegation of the PRC, Special Report 43-32, Jet Propulsion Laboratory, pp. 5–11. English translation by JPL of a lecture originally published in 1976 in a special issue of the Journal of the Seismological Society of Japan (in Japanese).
- Chen, Yong; Tsoi, Kam-Ling; Chen, Feibi; Gao, Zhenhuan; Zou, Qijia; Chen, Zhangli, eds. (1988), The Great Tangshan Earthquake of 1976: An Anatomy of Disaster, Oxford: Pergamon Press, p. 153, ISBN 978-0080348759, LCCN 88005916.
- Chen, Qi-Fu; Wang, Kelin (November 2010), "The 2008 Wenchuan Earthquake and Earthquake Prediction in China", Bulletin of the Seismological Society of America, 100 (5B): 2840–2857, Bibcode:2010BuSSA.100.2840C, doi:10.1785/0120090314.
- Chinese Earthquake Administration (5 May 2009), "二十世纪以来死亡人数最多的地震" [The most deadly earthquake since the twentieth century].
- Chu, Fung-Ming (August 1976), "Outline of Prediction and Forecast of Haicheng Earthquake of M=7.3" (PDF), in Muller, Paul M. (ed.), Proceedings of Lectures by the Seismological Delegation of the PRC, Special Report 43-32, Jet Propulsion Laboratory, pp. 11–19. English translation by JPL of a lecture originally published in 1976 in a special issue of the Journal of the Seismological Society of Japan (in Japanese).
- Dong, Guangjian; Wang, Yuren (2002), "Repair and Recovery of the Douhe Reservoir" (PDF), in Housner, George W.; He, Duxin (eds.), The Great Tangshan Earthquake of 1976, vol. 3, Pasadena, California: Earthquake Engineering Research Laboratory, California Institute of Technology, pp. 781–786.
- Geller, Robert J. (December 1997), "Earthquake prediction: a critical review" (PDF), Geophysical Journal International, 131 (3): 425–450, Bibcode:1997GeoJI.131..425G, doi:10.1111/j.1365-246X.1997.tb06588.x.
- Golany, Gideon S. (1992), Chinese Earth-Sheltered Dwellings: Indigenous Lessons for Modern Urban Design, University of Hawaii Press, ISBN 978-0-8248-1369-7.
- Guo, Lei; Qian, Jiawei; Zhang, Suxin; Zhou, Yi; Wang, Xiang (2022), "Seismicity and velocity structure of the 2020 Ms 5.1 Tangshan earthquake", Journal of Seismology, 26 (2): 359–371, Bibcode:2022JSeis..26..359G, doi:10.1007/s10950-022-10073-0, S2CID 246654390.
- Guo, Anning [郭安宁] (2008), 中国唐山大地震 [China's Tangshan Earthquake], 陕西科学技术出版社.
- Guo, Anning [郭安宁]; Guo, Zengjian [郭增建] (2018), 唐山地震与大地震预测探索, 西安地图出版社.
- Guo, Shunmin (2002), "Occurrence of the Tangshan Earthquake from the View of Fault Block Movement", in Housner, George W.; He, Duxin (eds.), The Great Tangshan Earthquake of 1976, vol. 1, Pasadena, California: Earthquake Engineering Research Laboratory, California Institute of Technology, pp. 24–47.
- Hammond, Allen L. (7 May 1976), "Earthquakes: An evacuation in China, a warning in California", Science, 192 (4239): 538–539, Bibcode:1976Sci...192..538H, doi:10.1126/science.192.4239.538, PMID 17745640.
- Housner, George W.; He, Duxin, eds. (2002), "Overview Volume" (PDF), The Great Tangshan Earthquake of 1976, Pasadena, California: Earthquake Engineering Research Laboratory, California Institute of Technology. English translation of the Chinese report of 1986.
- Hebei Province, Tangshan City Gazette Editorial Committee [河北省唐山市地方志编纂委员会], ed. (1999), 唐山市志·第一卷, 方志出版社
- Hou, Jian-Jun; Han, Mu-Kang; Chai, Bao-Long; Han, Heng-Yue (May 1998), "Geomorphological observations of active faults in the epicentral region of the Huaxian large earthquake in 1556 in Shaanxi Province, China", Journal of Structural Geology, 20 (5): 549–557, Bibcode:1998JSG....20..549H, doi:10.1016/S0191-8141(97)00112-0.
- International Commission on Earthquake Forecasting for Civil Protection (30 May 2011), "Operational Earthquake Forecasting: State of Knowledge and Guidelines for Utilization", Annals of Geophysics, 54 (4): 315–391, doi:10.4401/ag-5350, hdl:20.500.11820/6552f865-6e59-47f1-a5ec-b7446bfd1a82, S2CID 129825964.
- International Seismological Centre, ISC-EHB Bulletin, Thatcham, United Kingdom
- Jennings, Paul C. (1980), "Chapter 4: Report on the Tangshan Earthquake", Earthquake Engineering and Hazards Reduction in China: A Trip Report of the American Earthquake Engineering and Hazards Reduction Delegation, National Academy of Sciences, pp. 69–133, ISBN 978-0-309-02937-7.
- Kerr, Richard (2 November 1979), "Prospects for Earthquake Prediction Wane", Science, 206 (4418): 542–545, Bibcode:1979Sci...206..542K, doi:10.1126/science.206.4418.542, PMID 17759414.
- Kusky, Timothy M.; Li, Jianhai (December 2003), "Paleoproterozoic tectonic evolution of the North China Craton", Journal of Asian Earth Sciences, 22 (4): 383–397, Bibcode:2003JAESc..22..383K, doi:10.1016/S1367-9120(03)00071-3.
- Kusky, Timothy M.; Windley, B. F.; Zhai, M.-G. (2007), Zhai, M.-G.; Windley, B. F.; Kusky, T. M.; Meng, Q. R. (eds.), "Tectonic evolution of the North China Block: from orogen to craton to orogen" (PDF), Mesozoic Sub-Continental Lithospheric Thinning Under Eastern Asia, Special Publications 280, vol. 280, no. 1, Geological Society, pp. 1–34, Bibcode:2007GSLSP.280....1K, doi:10.1144/SP280.1, S2CID 129902429.
- Li, Lisa Yinghong (2016), "Chapter 21: Experiencing Disasters in Two Places: China's 1976 Tangshan Earthquake and Japan's 2011 Earthquake, Tsunami, and Nuclear Radiation", in Karan, Pradyumna P.; Suganuma, Unryu (eds.), Japan after 3/11: Global Perspectives on the Earthquake, Tsunami, and Fukushima Meltdown, University Press of Kentucky, pp. 417–431, ISBN 978-0-8131-6730-5.
- Liao, Shuqiao; Gu, Zuoqin (2002), "Damage to Railway Engineering" (PDF), in Housner, George W.; He, Duxin (eds.), The Great Tangshan Earthquake of 1976, vol. 1, Pasadena, California: Earthquake Engineering Research Laboratory, California Institute of Technology, pp. 1–59.
- 林[Lin], 泉 [Quan] (1982), 地球的震撼 [The Earth's Shock] (in Chinese), Beijing, China: 中国地震出版社 [Seismological Press].
- Lomnitz, Cinna; Lomnitz, Larissa (12 January 1978), "Tangshan 1976: a case history in earthquake prediction", Nature, 271 (5641): 109–111, Bibcode:1978Natur.271..109L, doi:10.1038/271109a0.
- Malcolm, Andrew H. (2 June 1977), "Chinese Disclose That 1976 Quake Was Deadliest in Four Centuries", The New York Times, p. 1.
- Mao, Yingsheng; Liang, ZhiJiang; Cui, Fuwen (2002), "Lightly Damaged Bridges in the High Intensity Earthquake Zone", in Housner, George W.; He, Duxin (eds.), The Great Tangshan Earthquake of 1976, vol. 3, Pasadena, California: Earthquake Engineering Research Laboratory, California Institute of Technology, pp. 231–242.
- Mi, Enli (2002), "The Repair and Restoration of the Kailuan Coal Mine" (PDF), in Housner, George W.; He, Duxin (eds.), The Great Tangshan Earthquake of 1976, vol. 3, Pasadena, California: Earthquake Engineering Research Laboratory, California Institute of Technology, pp. 747–764.
- Palmer, James (2012), Heaven Cracks, Earth Shakes: The Tangshan Earthquake and the Death of Mao's China, Basic Books, ISBN 978-0-465-01478-1.
- "Southern Liaoning: Results of earthquake prediction and forecasting" (PDF), Peking Review, vol. 18, no. 12, pp. 20–21, 21 March 1975
- Pelling, Mark; Dill, Kathleen (2006), "'Natural' Disasters as Catalysts of Political Action" (PDF), Burmalibrary.org, ISP/NSC Briefing paper.
- Peng, Funan (June 2008), "The success of the prediction of Haicheng earthquake and the negligence of the Tangshan earthquake", Engineering Sciences, 6 (2): 9–18, archived from the original on 5 August 2018.
- Press, Frank; Bullock, Mary; Hamilton, Robert M.; Brace, William F.; Kisslinger, Carl; Bonilla, Manuel G.; Allen, Clarence C.; Sykes, Lynn R.; Raleigh, C. Barry; Knopoff, Leon; Clough, Ray W.; Hofheinz, Roy (1975), "Earthquake Research in China", Eos, Transactions, American Geophysical Union, 56 (11): 838–881, Bibcode:1975EOSTr..56..838., doi:10.1029/EO056i011p00838. The "American Seismological Delegation".
- Qian, Denggao; Zhu, Chendong (2002), "Emergency at the Baihe River Main Dam on the Miyuan Reservoir" (PDF), in Housner, George W.; He, Duxin (eds.), The Great Tangshan Earthquake of 1976, vol. 3, Pasadena, California: Earthquake Engineering Research Laboratory, California Institute of Technology, pp. 787–791.
- Raleigh, C. B.; Bennett, G.; Craig, H.; Hanks, T.; Molnar, P.; Nur, A.; Savage, J.; Scholz, C.; Turner, R.; Wu, F. (May 1977), "Prediction of the Haicheng earthquake", Eos, Transactions, American Geophysical Union, 58 (5): 236–272, Bibcode:1977EOSTr..58..236., doi:10.1029/EO058i005p00236.The Haicheng Earthquake Study Delegation.
- Scholz, Christopher (March 1997), "What Ever Happened to Earthquake Prediction?", Geotimes, 42 (3).
- Shen, Ersong (2002), "Repair of the Tangshan Municipal Water Supply System and Recovery of the Water Supply", in Housner, George W.; He, Duxin (eds.), The Great Tangshan Earthquake of 1976, vol. 3, Pasadena, California: Earthquake Engineering Research Laboratory, California Institute of Technology, pp. 819–822.
- Spence, Jonathan (1991), The Search for Modern China, W. W. Norton & Company, ISBN 978-0-393-30780-1.
- Spignesi, Stephen J. (2004) [2002 November], Catastrophe!: The 100 Greatest Disasters of All Time, Citadel Press, ISBN 978-0-8065-2558-7, archived from the original on 21 October 2021.
- State Council Document No. 69, 29 June 1974, archived from the original on 21 April 2010.
- Stoltman, Joseph P.; Lidstone, John; Dechano, M. Lisa. (2004), International Perspectives on Natural Disasters, Springer Publishing, ISBN 978-1-4020-2850-2.
- Su, Youpo [苏幼坡]; Zhang, Yumin [张玉敏] (2006), 唐山大地震震害分布研究 (PDF), 地震工程与工程振动, 26 (3): 18–21, archived from the original (PDF) on 13 January 2025
- Tao, Ruqian [陶如谦]; Wang, Ziping [王子平], eds. (1996), 河北省震灾社会调查 [Social survey on Hebei earthquakes, 1966–1989], 地震出版社
- Wang, Kelin; Chen, Qi-Fu; Sun, Shihong; Wang, Andong (June 2006), "Predicting the 1975 Haicheng Earthquake" (PDF), Bulletin of the Seismological Society of America, 96 (3): 757–795, Bibcode:2006BuSSA..96..757W, doi:10.1785/0120050191.
- Wang, Ru-diao (February 2007), "Questioning about that "830 Thousand People Died" in the 1556 Huaxian Earthquake", Earthquake Research in Shanxi, 2: 42–46, ISSN 1000-6265, archived from the original on 6 December 2018.
- Wang, Zanwei [王瓒玮] (28 July 2016). 唐山大地震四十年：反思与"记忆" [40 years after Tangshan earthquake: reflections and 'memory']. 东方历史评论. 广东省东方历史研究基金会. Alternative title "唐山大地震40年：从死亡人数到天灾还是人祸仍是一地鸡毛" on 界面新闻, 28 July 2016. Archived from the original on 15 January 2021..
- Wang, Zixing; Cui, Xifu; Liu, Keren (2002), "Disaster Relief After the Tangshan Earthquake" (PDF), in Housner, George W.; He, Duxin (eds.), The Great Tangshan Earthquake of 1976, vol. 3, Pasadena, California: Earthquake Engineering Research Laboratory, California Institute of Technology, pp. 747–764.
- Whitham, K.; Berry, M.J.; Heidebrecht, A.C.; Kanasewich, E.R.; Milne, W.G (1976), "Earthquake Prediction in China", Geoscience Canada, 3 (4): 96, 263–268.
- Xia, Mingfang [夏明方] (2020). "家庭的解体与重生：历史视野下的唐山大地震". In 夏明方 (ed.). 文明的"双相"——灾害与历史的缠绕. 广西师范大学出版社. Archived from the original on 22 July 2020 – via 澎湃新闻, 13 July 2020.
- Xie, Lili; Qu, Zhe (January 2018), "On civil engineering disasters and their mitigation" (PDF), Earthquake Engineering and Engineering Vibration, 17 (1): 1–10, Bibcode:2018EEEV...17....1X, doi:10.1007/s11803-018-0420-6, S2CID 116230669.
- Xiao, Yuefan (October 2013), The Politics of Crisis Management in China [dissertation] (PDF).
- Xing, Jiaming; Zou, Baoshan (2002), "Geomorphologic Characteristics in the Beijing–Tianjin–Tangshan Area and Their Relation with Tectonic Activity" (PDF), in Housner, George W.; He, Duxin (eds.), The Great Tangshan Earthquake of 1976, vol. 1, Pasadena, California: Earthquake Engineering Research Laboratory, California Institute of Technology, pp. 85–98.
- 唐山地震纪念墙上的新名字：每个名字，都是一块墓碑 [The new name on the Tangshan earthquake memorial wall: each name is a tombstone], 新京报 (in Chinese), 29 July 2017, archived from the original on 7 February 2019 – via Xinhua News Net
- Xu, Wei (2002), "Earthquake Intensity Distribution in the City of Beijing" (PDF), in Housner, George W.; He, Duxin (eds.), The Great Tangshan Earthquake of 1976, vol. 1, Pasadena, California: Earthquake Engineering Research Laboratory, California Institute of Technology, pp. 241–243.
- Yang, Lihua (2002a), "Geologic-Tectonic Background and Seismogenic Structure of the Tangshan Earthquake" (PDF), in Housner, George W.; He, Duxin (eds.), The Great Tangshan Earthquake of 1976, vol. 1, Pasadena, California: Earthquake Engineering Research Laboratory, California Institute of Technology, pp. 85–98.
- Yang, Lihua (2002b), "Distribution and Ground Failure Intensity Distribution of the Tangshan Earthquake" (PDF), in Housner, George W.; He, Duxin (eds.), The Great Tangshan Earthquake of 1976, vol. 1, Pasadena, California: Earthquake Engineering Research Laboratory, California Institute of Technology, pp. 171–183.
- Yao, Binghua (2002), "Earthquake Damage Distribution in the City of Beijing" (PDF), in Housner, George W.; He, Duxin (eds.), The Great Tangshan Earthquake of 1976, vol. 1, Pasadena, California: Earthquake Engineering Research Laboratory, California Institute of Technology, pp. 244–248.
- Yeoh, Emile Kok-Kheng (October 2010), "Changing China: Three Decades of Social Transformation", International Journal of China Studies, 1 (2): 239–308, ISSN 2180-3250.
- Zhang, Qingzhou [张庆洲] (2006). 唐山警世录：七·二八大地震漏报始末 [The Cautionary Tale from Tangshan: how the missed prediction unfolded]. 上海人民出版社. Archived from the original on 13 January 2025..
- Zhao, Yucheng (2002), "Earthquake Damage to Shafts and Roadways in Kailuan" (PDF), in Housner, George W.; He, Duxin (eds.), The Great Tangshan Earthquake of 1976, vol. 2, Pasadena, California: Earthquake Engineering Research Laboratory, California Institute of Technology, pp. 625–645.
- Zhu, Chuanzhen (2002), "Seismic Activity in Tangshan and its Surrounding Areas" (PDF), in Housner, George W.; He, Duxin (eds.), The Great Tangshan Earthquake of 1976, vol. 1, Pasadena, California: Earthquake Engineering Research Laboratory, California Institute of Technology, pp. 1–23.
- Zhen, Liu (12 July 2020), "Chinese city of Tangshan hit by magnitude 5.1 quake, stirring memories of 1976 tragedy", South China Morning Post.
- Yu, Shan [于山]; Su, Youpo [苏幼坡]; Liu, Tianshi [刘天适]; Liu, Ruiqing [刘瑞興] (2003), 唐山大地震震后救援与恢复重建 [Rescue, Recovery and Reconstruction after the Tangshan Earthquake], 中国科学技术出版社.
- Chen, Yuxuan; Liu, Mian; Wang, Hui (2021), "Aftershocks and Background Seismicity in Tangshan and the Rest of North China", Journal of Geophysical Research: Solid Earth, 126 (5): 625–645, Bibcode:2021JGRB..12621395C, doi:10.1029/2020JB021395, S2CID 234848679.
- Wang, Libo [王利波] (2009). Buried [掩埋] (documentary, English subtitled). Chinese Independent Film Archive, Newcastle University.
- Zeng, Zimo [曾子墨] (13 October 2005). 唐山地震二十九年祭（上） [Tangshan 29th anniversary, Ep. 1)]. 社会能见度 (documentary series). Phoenix Television. Transcript, Ep.1.
- Zeng, Zimo [曾子墨] (20 October 2005). 唐山地震二十九年祭（下） [Tangshan 29th anniversary, Ep. 2)]. 社会能见度 (documentary series). Phoenix Television. Transcript, Ep.2.
