= 1976 Çaldıran–Muradiye earthquake =

November 1976 earthquake in eastern Turkey

- Location within Turkey
- UTC time: 1976-11-24 12:22:17
- ISC event: 706299
- USGS-ANSS: ComCat
- Local date: 24 November 1976
- Local time: 14:22:17
- Duration: 6 seconds
- Magnitude: 7.3 M_{s}
- Depth: 36 km (22 mi)
- Epicenter: 39.12°N 44.03°E
- Type: Strike-slip
- Areas affected: Turkey, Iran
- Max. intensity: MMI X (Extreme)
- Casualties: 4,000–5,000 dead

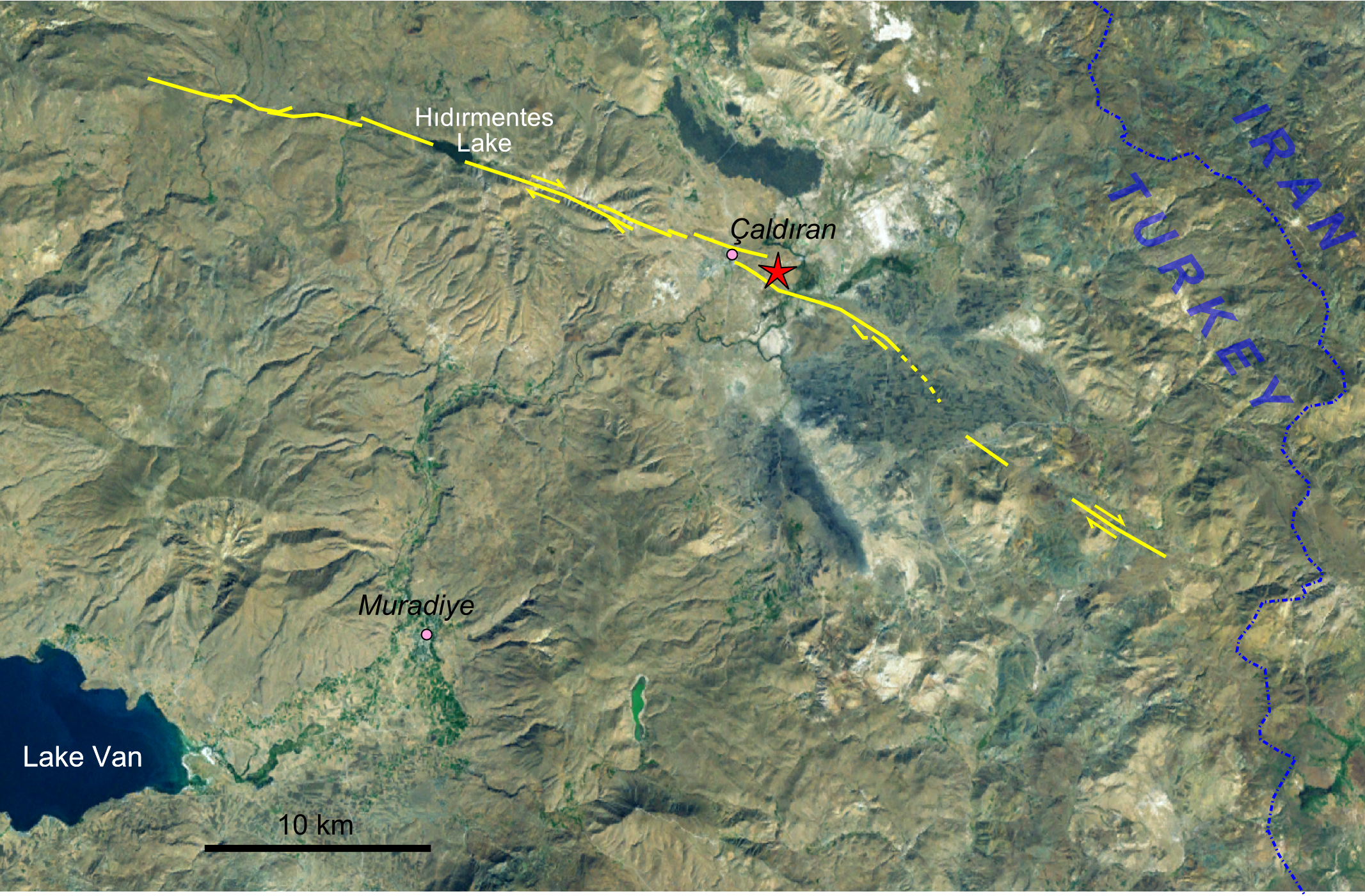
Extent of surface faulting in the earthquake, epicentre shown by red star

The 1976 Çaldıran–Muradiye earthquake occurred at 14:22 local time (12:22 UTC) on 24 November. The epicenter was located near Çaldıran, 20 km northeast of Muradiye, in the Van Province of eastern Turkey. The earthquake had a magnitude of 7.3 with a maximum intensity of X (Extreme) on the Mercalli intensity scale. The area of severe damage, where over 80% of the buildings were destroyed, covered an area of 2,000 square kilometres. There were between 4,000 and 5,000 casualties.

== Tectonic setting ==
The easternmost part of Turkey lies within the complex zone of continuing continental collision between the Arabian plate and the Eurasian plate. The overall shortening that affects this area is accommodated partly by thrusting along the Bitlis-Zagros fold and thrust belt and partly by a mixture of sinistral strike-slip on SW-NE trending faults and dextral strike-slip on NW-SE trending faults. The earthquake was caused by movement on the Çaldıran Fault, one of the dextral faults, which had not been recognized before the earthquake. No earthquakes with magnitudes of 6 or greater were recorded within 100 km of Çaldıran in the preceding 74 years, possibly explaining why it was considered an area of only intermediate seismic risk (zone 3 out of the five-zone system of seismic risking used in Turkey at the time, with zone 1 being the highest).

== Earthquake ==
The earthquake was associated with a 50–55 km zone of surface faulting, extending from three kilometres west of Sarikök in the west to just west of Baydoğan in the east. A maximum dextral offset of 3.5 m was recorded. The rupture width was estimated at 24 km and the fault zone was found to dip at 78° to the south. The duration of strong ground shaking is estimated at six seconds.

== Damage ==
In Çaldıran, 95% of the houses were destroyed with all the others damaged to some extent, and 615 of the 3,304 inhabitants were killed. In the villages around Çaldıran, over 80% of the houses were destroyed and most of the rest were damaged; 2,313 of the 27,587 inhabitants were killed. In Muradiye, almost all the houses were either completely collapsed or damaged, and 159 of the 6,753 inhabitants were killed.

Most of the buildings in the epicentral area were constructed of thick walls made from rubble masonry cemented with mud mortar. The structures were typically finished with a heavy earth roof with wooden supports. The very low resistance to lateral loads of these structures explains why almost all the buildings in Çaldıran collapsed in the earthquake, causing most of the deaths. Reinforced concrete structures generally performed well, with none suffering complete collapse. The performance of brick or stone masonry structures was mixed, with some collapsing and others being apparently unaffected.

== See also ==
- List of earthquakes in 1976
- List of earthquakes in Iran
- List of earthquakes in Turkey
