= Tangshan Earthquake Memorial Park =

1976 Tangshan earthquake memorial in Tangshan, Hebei, China

Coordinates: 39.596111°N 118.179167°E

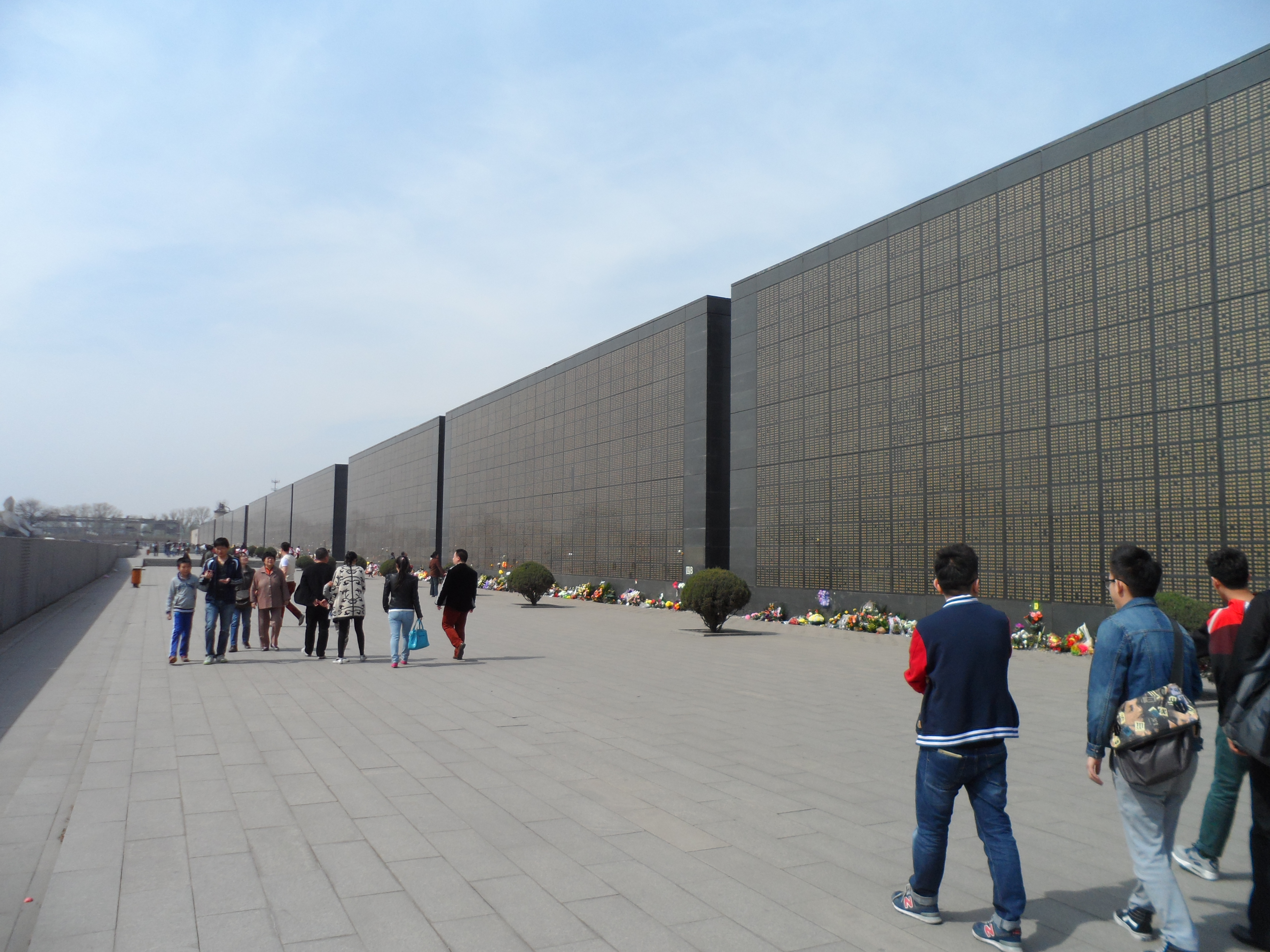
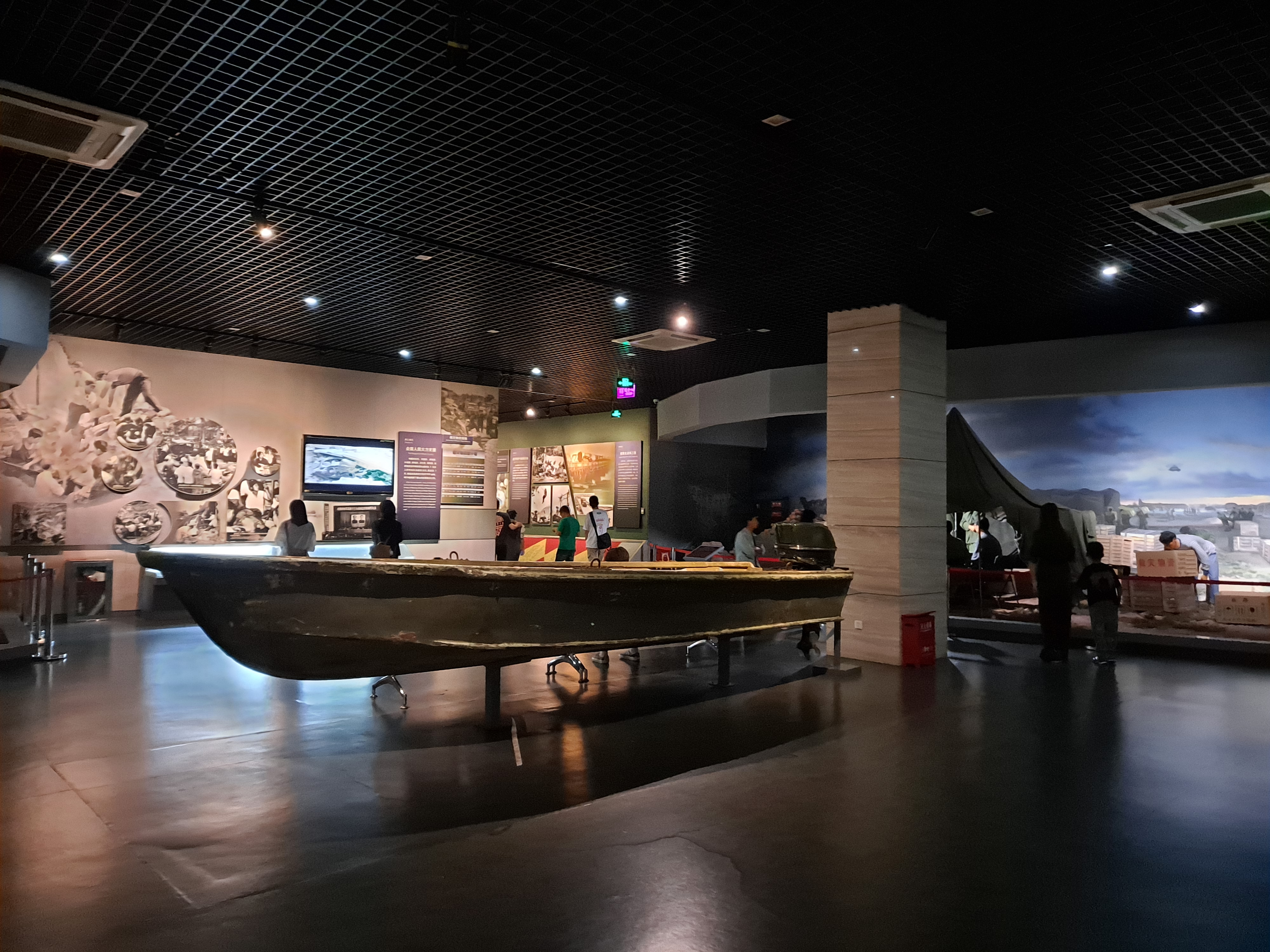
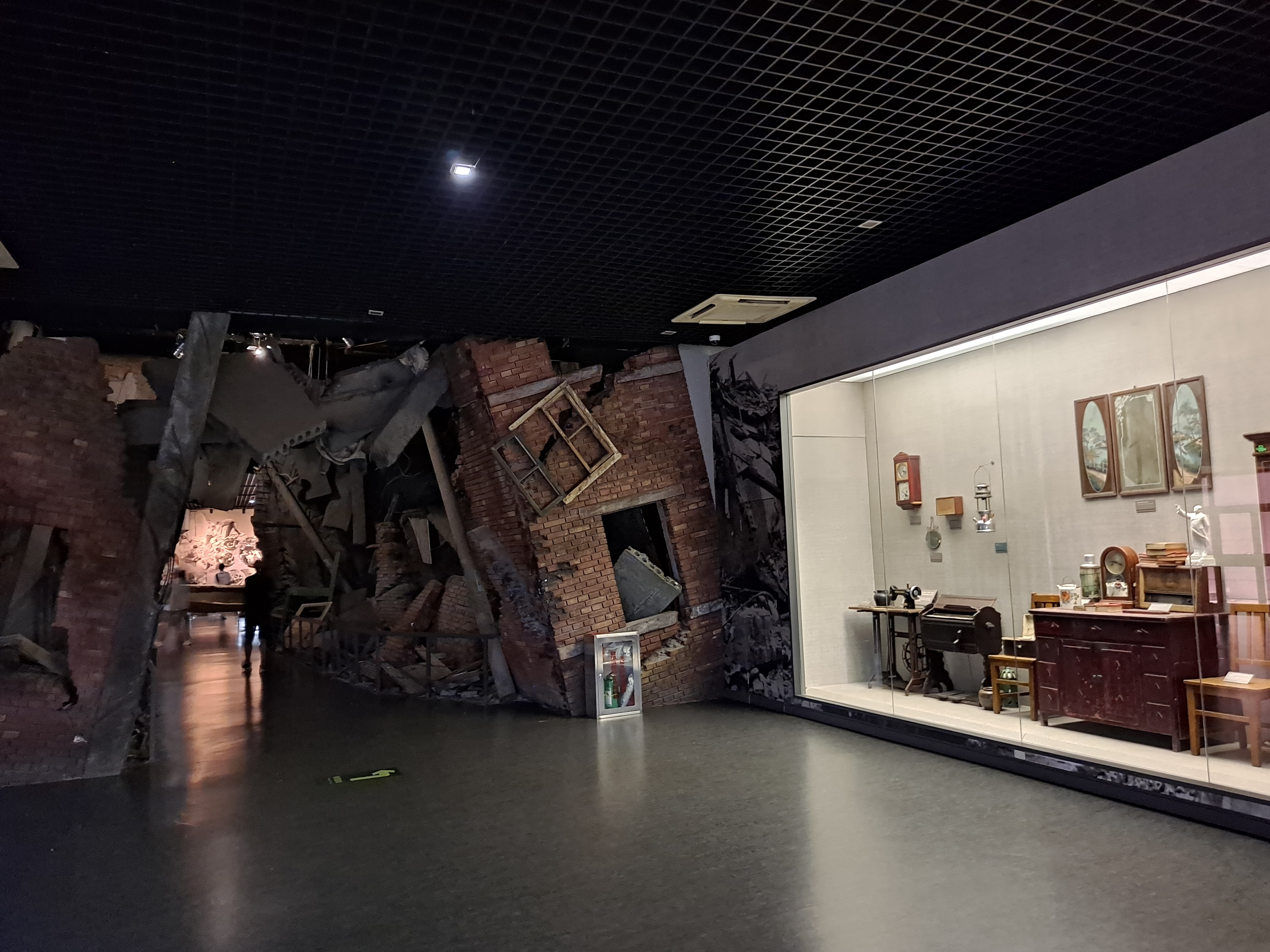
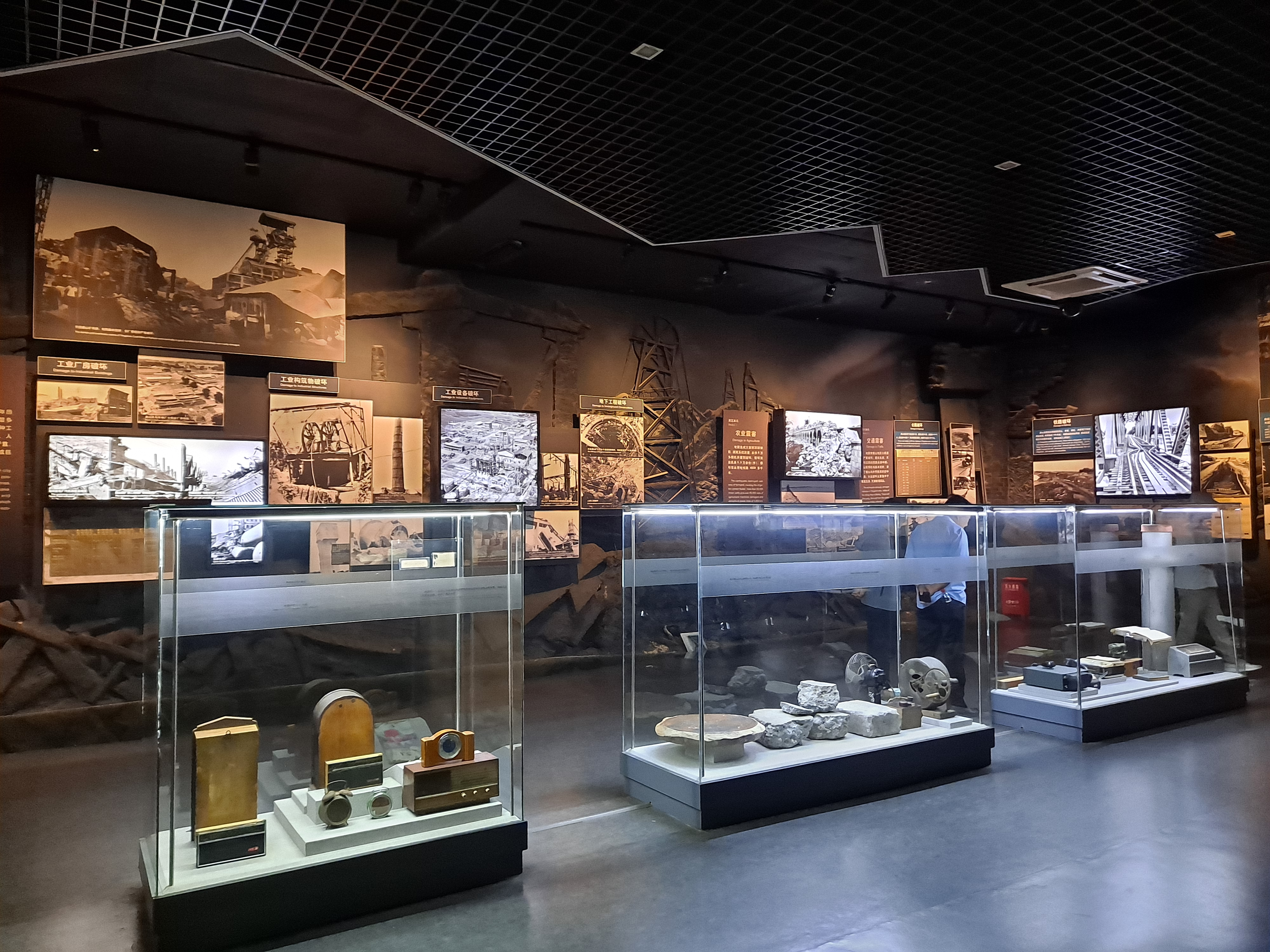
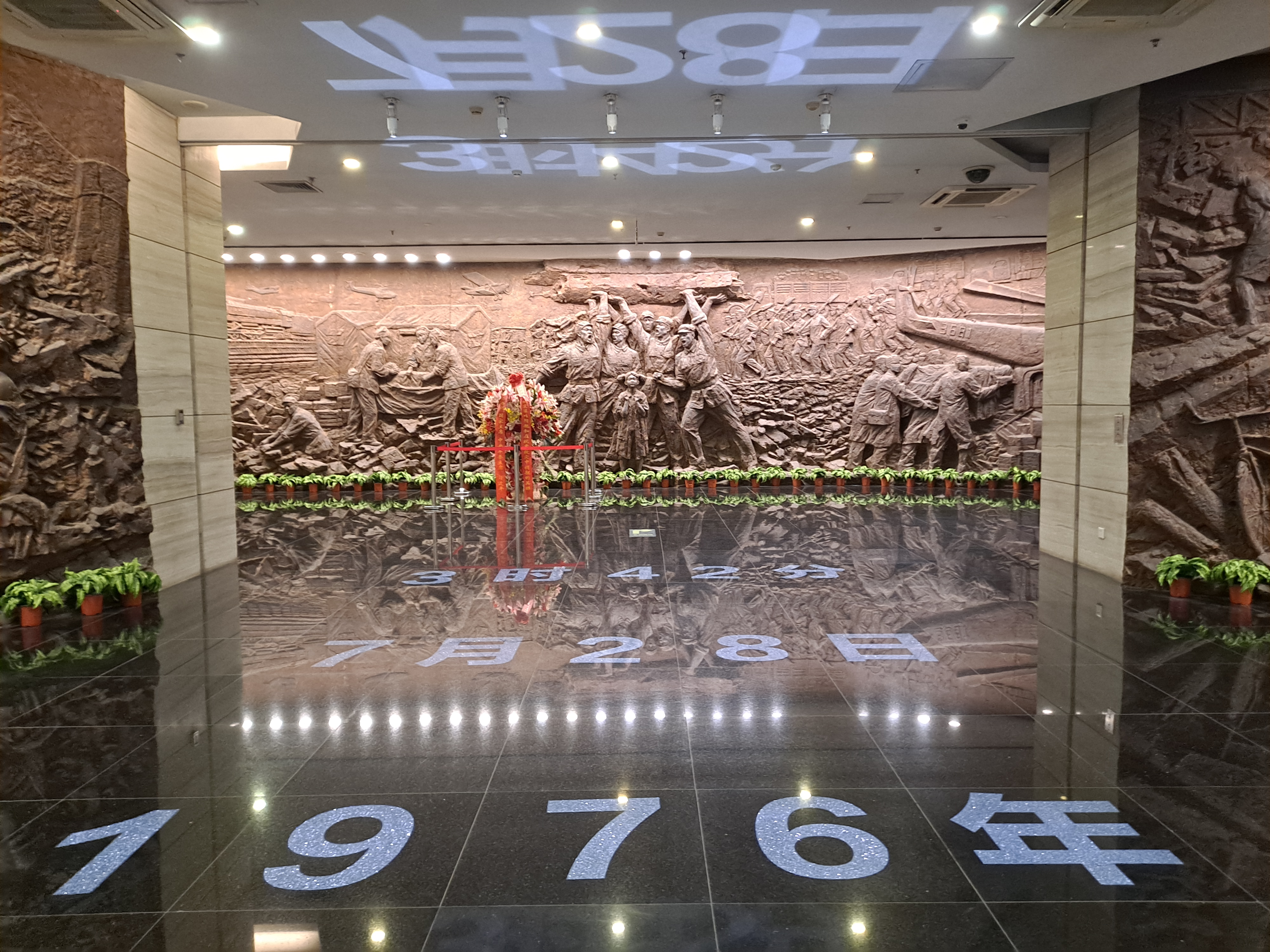
- Tangshan Earthquake Memorial Park
- Simplified Chinese: 唐山地震遗址纪念公园
- Traditional Chinese: 唐山地震遺址紀念公園
Transcriptions
Standard Mandarin
- Hanyu Pinyin: Tángshān Dìzhènyízhǐ Jìniàn Gōngyuán

Tangshan Earthquake Memorial Park is located to the east of Nanhu Park, Tangshan, China. The park in built in memory of the 1976 Tangshan earthquake. The Tangshan Earthquake Museum, the Tangshan earthquake ruins at Tangshan Rolling Stock and the memorial walls engraved with names of the earthquake victims are in the park.

The Wall is almost 300 meters long as a 2 football fields as names.
