= 1976 Songpan–Pingwu earthquake =

August 1976 earthquake in Sichuan, China

- Location within China
- UTC time: Triplet earthquake: A: 1976-08-16 14:06:46; B: 1976-08-21 21:49:53; C: 1976-08-23 03:30:07
- ISC event: A: 709871; B: 710167; C: 710223
- USGS-ANSS: A: ComCat; B: ComCat; C: ComCat
- Local date: August 16, 22, and 23
- Local time: A: 22:06; B: 05:49; C: 11:33
- Magnitude: A: 6.7 M_{w}, 7.0 M_{s}; B: 6.3 M_{w}, 6.6 M_{s}; C: 6.4 M_{w}, 6.7 M_{s}
- Depth: A: 8 km (5 mi) B: 15 km (9 mi) C: 19 km (12 mi)
- Epicenter: 32.69°N 104.2°E
- Fault: Huya
- Type: Reverse and left-lateral
- Areas affected: Songpan and Pingwu, Sichuan
- Max. intensity: MMI X (Extreme)
- Foreshocks: Three year swarm
- Casualties: 38 dead, 800 injured

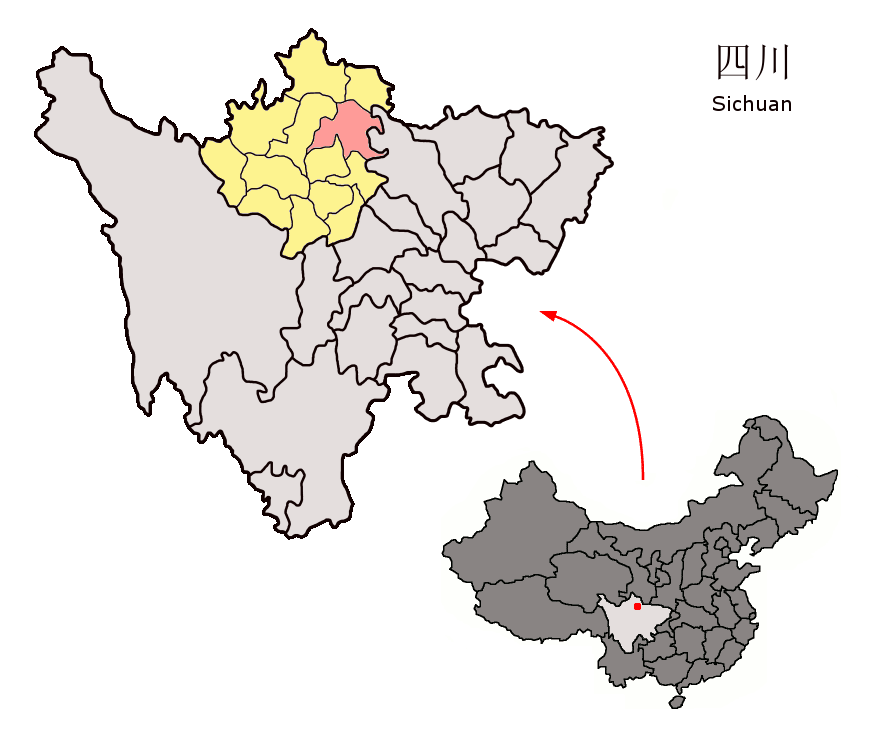
Map of Songpan County (pink) and Ngawa Prefecture (yellow) within Sichuan province of China

The 1976 Songpan–Pingwu earthquake that struck Songpan and Pingwu counties in Sichuan, China consisted of three mainshocks on the 16th, 21st, and 23rd (UTC) of August. A 1984 report gave the magnitudes as 7.2, 6.7, and 7.2, respectively (scale not specified). The magnitudes were subsequently recalculated as 6.7, 6.3, and 6.4 on the M_{w} scale, and 7.0, 6.6, and 6.7 on the M_{s} scale. These were preceded by an earthquake swarm lasting three years. During the period from August 16 to August 31 there were over 400 aftershocks of magnitude 3.0 or greater.

Short term earthquake warning were issued 3 months before the earthquake. There were 38 dead in the four counties struck—Songpan, Pingwu, Maowen and Nanping. More than 5,000 houses collapsed and 2800 heads of livestock lost. The earthquake was felt as far as Gaotai, Gansu to the west, Kunming, Yunnan to the south, Hohhot, Inner Mongolia to the north, and Changsha, Hunan to the east; an area with a maximum radius of 1,150 kilometers (714 miles). The total number of casualties was 800, 600 of them slightly injured, mostly due to mudslides. The Earthquake Administration of Sichuan won the Chinese National Science and Technology Award of 1978 for successfully predicting the earthquake.

== See also ==
- 1976 Tangshan earthquake (July 27/28)
- 1976 Longling earthquake (May 29)
- List of earthquakes in 1976
- List of earthquakes in China
- List of earthquakes in Sichuan

== Sources ==
- ANSS, "Sichuan 1976a: M 6.9 – Sichuan-Gansu border region, China", Comprehensive Catalog, U.S. Geological Survey
- ANSS, "Sichuan 1976b: M 6.4 – Sichuan-Gansu border region, China", Comprehensive Catalog, U.S. Geological Survey
- ANSS, "Sichuan 1976c: M 6.7 – Sichuan-Gansu border region, China", Comprehensive Catalog, U.S. Geological Survey
- International Seismological Centre, ISC-EHB Bulletin, Thatcham, United Kingdom
- International Seismological Centre, ISC-GEM Global Instrumental Earthquake Catalogue, Thatcham, United Kingdom
- Jones, L. M.; Han, W.; Hauksson, E.; Jin, A.; Zhang, Y.; Luo, Z. (1984), "Focal mechanisms and aftershock locations of the Songpan earthquakes of August 1976 in Sichuan, China" (PDF), Journal of Geophysical Research, 89 (B9): 7697–7707, Bibcode:1984JGR....89.7697J, doi:10.1029/jb089ib09p07697.
