= 1976 Papua earthquake =

Earthquake in Indonesia

- Location within Western New Guinea Location within Indonesia
- UTC time: 1976-06-25 19:18:56
- ISC event: 713087
- USGS-ANSS: ComCat
- Local date: 26 June 1976
- Local time: 04:18:56 IEST
- Magnitude: 7.1 M_{s}
- Epicenter: 4.603°S 140.091°E
- Areas affected: Indonesia
- Max. intensity: MMI X (Extreme)
- Casualties: at least 422 dead, over 5,000 missing

The 1976 Papua earthquake occurred on 26 June with a surface-wave magnitude of 7.1 in Yahukimo Regency near the border with Pegunungan Bintang Regency, Highland Papua (then Irian Jaya), Indonesia. Total deaths for the event amounted to 422, including 70 who died in subsequent landslides.

== Background ==
Indonesia lies within the Pacific Ring of Fire, a sector of the Pacific where several tectonic plates intersect. This movement between the plates results in extremely high volcanic and seismic activity. Papua is constantly plagued by landslides.

== Damage and casualties ==
Directly after the earthquake the casualty count was assessed as 350 dead. However, landslides soon occurred in the affected area, leading to 72 more casualties, and 5,000–9,000 were missing and assumed dead after the landslides. A total of six villages were demolished in the area. The west sector of Irian and eastern New Guinea also reported that the earthquake was felt significantly in their region.

== See also ==
- List of earthquakes in 1976
- List of earthquakes in Indonesia
- 2009 West Papua earthquakes
