= Korean War Memorial Wall (Canada) =

Memorial to Canadians who served in the Korean War

Korean War Memorial
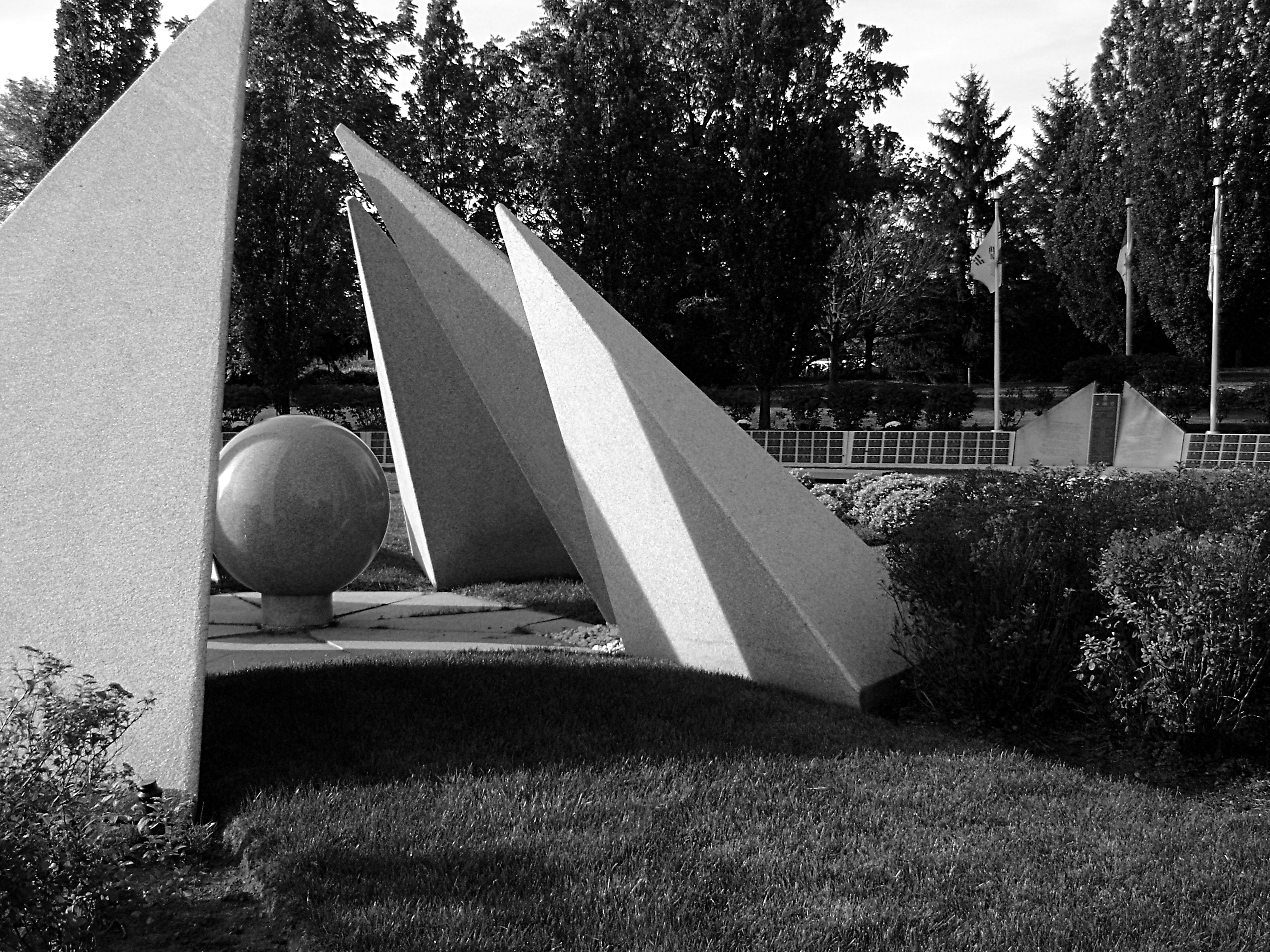
- Interactive map of Korean War Memorial
- Location: Brampton, Ontario
- Coordinates: 43°38′31″N 079°44′57″W
- Type: War memorial
- Material: Granite
- Length: 61 m (200 ft)
- Dedicated to: Those who served in the Korean War

The Korea Veterans Association of Canada erected a Wall of Remembrance to the 516 Canadians who are commemorated in the Korean War Book of Remembrance.

The Wall was dedicated on July 27, 1997, and is located at Brampton, Ontario's Meadowvale Cemetery.

The idea of a Wall of Remembrance came about when two members of Unit 57 of Korea Veterans Association (K.V.A.) were gathering information about a specific comrade who had been killed in Korea and a member of the family requested a picture of the comrades' grave in Pusan. The family were more than delighted to obtain a picture and it was then that the President, Bill Allan, came up with the concept of a Wall of Remembrance.

He solicited the support of the Secretary of the Unit and Past Presidents George Mannion, David Barker and members of Unit 57. They developed the plan, initiating meetings between the Corporation of Meadowvale Cemeteries and several government agencies to build the Wall of Remembrance. The committee raised $300,000.00 from the private sector.

The Wall of Remembrance (the Wall) was constructed of gray Barre granite, which matched the existing Veterans' Memorial. Approximately 200 feet in length, the Wall curves gently to follow the roadway which circles around the Veterans' Memorial. A low-profile retaining wall approximately two feet high, the Wall follows the natural topography which slopes gently towards the roadway. The Wall leans backwards at an angle of approximately 50 degrees.

The central feature of the Wall consists of three panels: a rectangular block flanked by two wings which slope down from the centre. They are four feet wide and approximately five feet high at the highest point. The rectangular block in the centre features the Korean Veterans Association insignia, the Canadian forces insignia, the United Nations insignia, and the names of the participating Canadian Forces.

On one wing is a poem by Jack LaChance, on the other, a verse from Laurence Binyon's famous poem "For the Fallen", information relating to the dedication of the memorial, and the names of the organizing committee responsible for getting this project off the ground.

The memorial, itself, consists of seven sections on each side of the central feature. Each section contains four rows of 6" X 10" bronze plaques, which are replicas of those gracing the graves of the comrades in Pusan.

== See also ==
- Korean War Memorial, Canberra, Australia
- Korean War Veterans Memorial, Washington, D.C.
- Philadelphia Korean War Memorial
- United Nations Memorial Cemetery, in Pusan, Korea, where many Canadian war dead are buried
- War Memorial of Korea, Seoul, Korea
