= Jintan Township, Qinghai =

Jintan Township 金滩乡
- Township
- Jintanxiang
- Location in Qinghai
- Coordinates: 36°49′49″N 101°4′50″E
- Country: People's Republic of China
- Province: Qinghai
- Autonomous prefecture: Haibei
- County: Haiyan County

Area
  - Total: 122 km^{2} (47 sq mi)

Population (2010)
  - Total: 5,100
  - Density: 42/km^{2} (110/sq mi)
- Time zone: UTC+8 (China Standard)
- Local dialing code: 971

Jintan Township (Chinese: 金滩乡) is a township in Haiyan County, Haibei, Qinghai, China. In 2010, Jintan Township had a total population of 5,100: 2,636 males and 2,464 females: 1,073 aged under 14, 3,706 aged between 15 and 65 and 321 aged over 65.
