= Heping Township, Qinghai =

Heping Township 和平乡
- Township
- Hepingxiang
- Location in Qinghai
- Coordinates: 36°37′39″N 101°15′16″E
- Country: People's Republic of China
- Province: Qinghai
- Autonomous prefecture: Xining
- County: Huangyuan County

Area
  - Total: 168.8 km^{2} (65.2 sq mi)

Population (2010)
  - Total: 13,628
  - Density: 80.73/km^{2} (209.1/sq mi)
- Time zone: UTC+8 (China Standard)
- Local dialing code: 971

Heping Township (Chinese: 和平乡) is a township in Huangyuan County, Xining, Qinghai, China. In 2010, Heping Township had a total population of 13,628: 7,220 males and 6,408 females: 2,444 aged under 14, 10,243 aged between 15 and 65 and 941 aged over 65.
