= China Earthquake Administration =

China Earthquake Administration (CEA)
- 中国地震局
- Logo of the China Earthquake Administration

Agency overview
- Formed: 1971
- Jurisdiction: People's Republic of China
- Headquarters: Beijing
- Agency executive: Min Yiren, Director
- Parent agency: State Council
- Website: www.cea.gov.cn

The China Earthquake Administration (CEA; 中国地震局) is a public institution managed by the State Council at the deputy ministerial level in charge of national earthquake disaster reduction work. It is currently managed by the Ministry of Emergency Management.

Its headquarters is in Haidian District.

Some English texts use the name Chinese Seismic Bureau (CSB). In older text, it was also referred to by its former name, National Earthquake Bureau (NEB) or National Seismic Bureau (NSB).

== Bureaus ==
China Earthquake Administration
- Simplified Chinese: 中国地震局
- Traditional Chinese: 中國地震局
- Literal meaning: "China Earthquake Bureau"
Transcriptions
Standard Mandarin
- Hanyu Pinyin: Zhōngguó Dìzhèng Jú
- Bopomofo: ㄓㄨㄥ ㄍㄨㄛˊ ㄉㄧˋ ㄓㄣˋ ㄐㄩˊ
Yue: Cantonese
- Jyutping: zung1 gwok3 dei6 zan3 guk6

CEA presently has nine subordinate bureaus.

- General Office (Office for Policy Research) (办公室（政策研究室）)
- Bureau of Development and Finance (发展与财务司)
- Bureau of Earthquake Monitoring and Forecasting (监测预报司)
- Bureau of Earthquake Damage Prevention (Bureau for Regulations) (震害防御司（法规司）)
- Bureau of Earthquake Emergency Rescue (震灾应急救援司)
- Department of Personnel, Education, Science, and Technology (Bureau of International Cooperation) (人事教育和科技司（国际合作司）)
- Party Committee (直属机关党委)
- Discipline Inspection Team of CCDI in the China Earthquake Administration (Bureau of Supervision) (中央纪委驻中国地震局纪检组（监察司）)
- Office of the Welfare of Retired Personnel (离退休干部办公室)

== Establishment ==
As a country stricken by two of the world's ten most fatal earthquakes before the creation of CEA, China's first seismic monitoring stations were set up under the Chinese Academy of Sciences. A national Earthquake Affairs Office (地震办公室)was created under joint administration of the National Science and Technology Commission (国家科学技术委员会) and Chinese Academy of Sciences after the 1966 Xingtai earthquakes. A Central Task Force of Earthquakes (中央地震工作小组) under the Central Committee of the Chinese Communist Party was created the day after a M7.4 earthquake struck Bohai Bay on July 18, 1969.

In 1971, the State Council decided to create the National Earthquake Bureau (CNEB), predecessor to CEA, to replace the "Central Task Force". The State Council initially delegated administration of the CNEB to the Chinese Academy of Sciences. CNEB became directly administrated by the State Council in 1975.

Following the recommendation from the CNEB, each province, autonomous regions and centrally administrated municipalities in PRC has established its own earthquake bureau since 1977. In 1985, these local bureaus were placed under dual leadership of the local government and the national bureau.

CNEB was renamed CEA in 1998.

== See also ==
- Tectonic summary of Qinghai Province
- List of National Key Seismic Heritage Sites in China
