= Shenzhong Township, Qinghai =

Shenzhong Township 申中乡
- Township
- Shenzhongxiang
- Location in Qinghai
- Coordinates: 36°43′33″N 101°11′38″E
- Country: People's Republic of China
- Province: Qinghai
- Autonomous prefecture: Xining
- County: Huangyuan County

Area
  - Total: 122.7 km^{2} (47.4 sq mi)

Population (2010)
  - Total: 14,594
  - Density: 118.9/km^{2} (308.1/sq mi)
- Time zone: UTC+8 (China Standard)
- Local dialing code: 971

Shenzhong Township (Chinese: 申中乡) is a township in Huangyuan County, Xining, Qinghai, China. In 2010, Shenzhong Township had a total population of 14,594: 7,470 males and 7,124 females: 2,596 aged under 14, 11,086 aged between 15 and 65 and 912 aged over 65.
