= Bohang Township, Qinghai =

Bohang Township 波航乡
- Township
- Bohangxiang
- Location in Qinghai
- Coordinates: 36°39′49″N 101°12′41″E
- Country: People's Republic of China
- Province: Qinghai
- Autonomous prefecture: Xining
- County: Huangyuan County

Area
  - Total: 85.55 km^{2} (33.03 sq mi)

Population (2010)
  - Total: 8,478
  - Density: 99.10/km^{2} (256.7/sq mi)
- Time zone: UTC+8 (China Standard)
- Local dialing code: 971

Bohang Township (Chinese: 波航乡) is a township in Huangyuan County, Xining, Qinghai, China. In 2010, Bohang Township had a total population of 8,478: 4,481 males and 3,997 females: 1,487 aged under 14, 6,418 aged between 15 and 65 and 573 aged over 65.
