= Bayan Township, Qinghai =

Bayan Township 巴燕乡
- Township
- Bayanxiang
- Location in Qinghai
- Coordinates: 36°46′3″N 101°8′7″E
- Country: People's Republic of China
- Province: Qinghai
- Autonomous prefecture: Xining
- County: Huangyuan County

Area
  - Total: 119.7 km^{2} (46.2 sq mi)

Population (2010)
  - Total: 9,569
  - Density: 79.94/km^{2} (207.0/sq mi)
- Time zone: UTC+8 (China Standard)
- Local dialing code: 971

Bayan Township (Chinese: 巴燕乡) is a township in Huangyuan County, Xining, Qinghai, China. In 2010, Bayan Township had a total population of 9,569: 4,882 males and 4,687 females: 1,753 aged under 14, 7,134 aged between 15 and 65 and 682 aged over 65.
