= Riyue Township, Qinghai =

Nyida Tibetan Ethnic Township 日月藏族乡 ཉི་ཟླ་བོད་རིགས་ཞང་། Riyue
- Ethnic township
- Location in Qinghai
- Coordinates: 36°31′4″N 101°9′26″E
- Country: China
- Province: Qinghai
- Prefecture-level city: Xining
- County: Huangyuan

Area
  - Total: 524 km^{2} (202 sq mi)

Population (2010)
  - Total: 13,315
  - Density: 25.4/km^{2} (65.8/sq mi)
- Time zone: UTC+8 (China Standard)
- Local dialing code: 971

Nyida Tibetan Ethnic Township or Riyue Township (Tibetan: ཉི་ཟླ་བོད་རིགས་ཞང་།, Chinese: 日月藏族乡) is an ethnic township in Huangyuan County, Xining, Qinghai, China. In 2010, Nyida Township had a total population of 13,315: 7,011 males and 6,304 females: 2,480 aged under 14, 10,048 aged between 15 and 65 and 787 aged over 65.
