= Chengguan, Huangyuan County =

Chengguan 城关镇
- Town
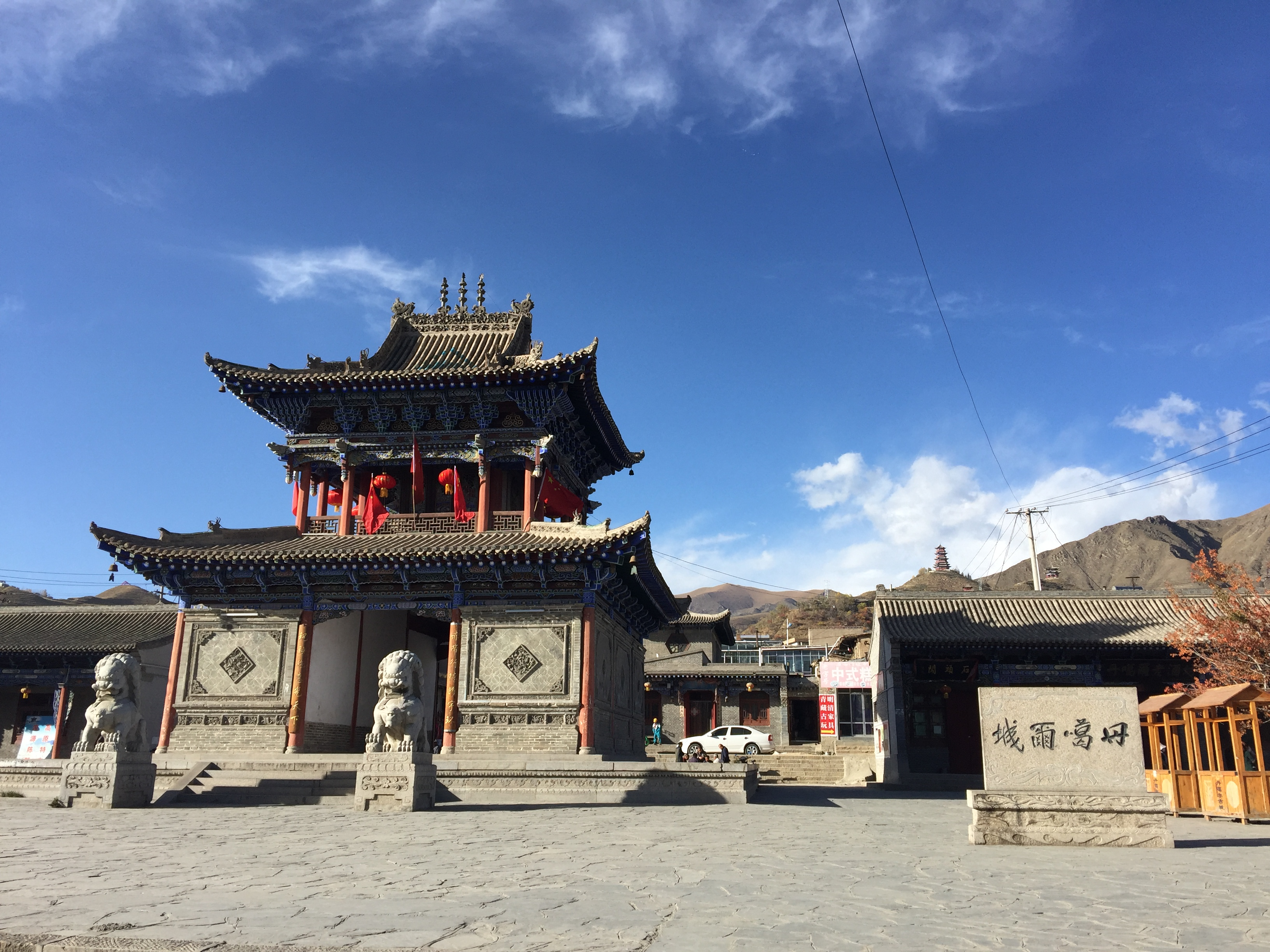
- Dan Gar Ancient Town

- Location in Qinghai and China
- Coordinates: 36°41′17″N 101°15′28″E
- Country: China
- Province: Qinghai
- Prefecture-level city: Xining
- County: Huangyuan

Population (2010)
  - Total: 43,871
- Time zone: UTC+8 (China Standard)

Chengguan
- Traditional Chinese: 城關
- Simplified Chinese: 城关
- Literal meaning: Bordertown
Transcriptions
Standard Mandarin
- Hanyu Pinyin: Chéngguān
- Wade–Giles: Ch‘êng-kuan

Huangyuan
- Chinese: 湟源
- Literal meaning: Source of Huang River
Transcriptions
Standard Mandarin
- Hanyu Pinyin: Huángyuán
- Wade–Giles: Huang-yüan

Tongkor

Chinese name
- Traditional Chinese: 丹噶爾
- Simplified Chinese: 丹噶尔
Transcriptions
Standard Mandarin
- Hanyu Pinyin: Dāngá'ěr
- Wade–Giles: Tan-ka-êrh

Tibetan name
- Tibetan: སྟོང་འཁོར
Transcriptions
- Wylie: Stong'khor
- THL: Tongkhor

Former names

Xiancheng
- Traditional Chinese: 縣城
- Simplified Chinese: 县城
- Literal meaning: County Town
Transcriptions
Standard Mandarin
- Hanyu Pinyin: Xiànchéng
- Wade–Giles: Hsien-ch‘êng

Zhongshan
- Chinese: 中山
- Literal meaning: Central Mountain (i.e., Sun Yat-sen)
Transcriptions
Standard Mandarin
- Hanyu Pinyin: Zhōngshān
- Wade–Giles: Chung-shan

Huangyang
- Traditional Chinese: 湟陽
- Simplified Chinese: 湟阳
- Literal meaning: Sunny Side of the Huang River
Transcriptions
Standard Mandarin
- Hanyu Pinyin: Huángyáng
- Wade–Giles: Huang-yang

Chengguan, also known as Huangyuan and by other names, is a town on the Huangshui River in Qinghai, China. It serves as the seat of Huangyuan County, lying about 45 km (28 mi) upstream (west) from the provincial capital of Xining and approximately 45 km (28 mi) east of Qinghai Lake. Chengguan has a 600-year history as a frontier trading post between the Chinese, Mongolian, and Tibetan cultural spheres.

== Names ==
The city was first known as Tongkor or Tongkhor, after a nearby lamasery established by the Tongkor reincarnation line. The name has been romanized in many different ways: Tang-keou-eul, Tang-kiuul, Tonkir, Tongor, Denger, Donkir, Dung kor, Tung kor, and Tankar. The name is still used in Tibetan and Mongolian, although after the Xinhai Revolution the name was changed in Chinese to Xiancheng in 1913, then to Zhongshan in honor of Sun Yat-sen, then to Huangyang in 1938. During the establishment of the People's Republic of China in 1949, it was finally renamed Chengguan.

Following Chinese practice, it is also frequently known as Huangyuan from the county it administers.

== History ==
The lamasery to the town's south was established in 1648 by Dogyu Gyatso, the 4th Tongkor, in remembrance of a visit to the area by Sonam Gyatso, the 3rd Dalai Lama. It became an important religious center for the Mongolian tribes of the area.

The town itself was formally recognized by the Qing Empire in 1727, the 5th year of the reign of the Yongzheng Emperor. It was walled and became an important border town and trading post on the route between China proper and Tibet. The journey to Lhasa was usually reckoned as 60–70 days. Caravans from Lhasa brought Buddhist books, woolen cloth of various colors and qualities, incense sticks, disks of chank-shells and amber for ornaments, furs, the best quality saffron ("K'a ch'é shakama") from Kashmir, cowries, dried dates, and brown sugar from India, and a few other items. Among the most valuable items brought by Tibetans or—more frequently—Nepalese, were conch shells with their whorls turning to the right. They were highly valued for use as trumpets ("Yä-chyil dung-kar") in the monasteries, to the point where they were classed among the establishments' "jewels". One of them could sell for between four and five hundred taels. The Chinese also placed a high value on them. A few traders from Khotan and Kashgar visited each year, usually in the autumn, bringing Khotan rugs, Hami raisins, dried melons and a few other things of little value. The exports contain goods of much higher value, including mules and horses, satin, silks and gold brocades, and chinaware.

During the First Dungan Revolt, the town and surrounding countryside were the scene of a massacre of around 10,000 Muslims. At the time, the other Chinese and Tibetans in the town numbered less than 10,000 themselves and were protected by only a nominal force of 200 men under a "colonel". Following the massacre, Muslims were banned from entering the town for a time and the town lost importance as a trade center.

After the Communist victory in the Chinese Civil War in 1949, Chengguan raised to district status. It was lowered to town status in 1953. Since the Reform and Opening Up Policy, the town has attempted to attract tourists with "Dan Gar Ancient Town" (古城, Gǔchéng), a restoration of some of the former walled city.
