= Qinghai delegation to the National People's Congress =

Qinghai Delegation to the National People's Congress
- 全国人民代表大会青海省代表团
- Delegation for the National People's Congress
- Map showing the location of Qinghai Province
- Electoral unit: Qinghai Province
- Population: 5,923,957

Current Delegation
- Created: 1954
- Seats: 24
- Head of delegation: Chen Gang
- Provincial People's Congress: Qinghai Provincial People's Congress

The Qinghai delegation to the National People's Congress is a delegation composed of deputies representing Qinghai Province in within the National People's Congress (NPC), the highest organ of state power of the People's Republic of China. NPC deputies from Qinghai Province are officially elected by the Qinghai Provincial People's Congress.

== List of deputies ==
Year	NPC sessions	Deputies	Number of deputies	Ref.
1954	1st	Zha Xiwangxu, Wang Feng, Zhou Renshan, Guan Baojia, Songbu, Xia Ronggabu, Sun Zuobin, Ma Xingtai, Xirao Jiacuo	9	
1959	2nd	Zha Xiwangxu, Sun Junyi, Guan Baojia, Songbu, Ma Mingji, Yuan Renyuan, Xia Ronggabu, Cao Juru, Xirao Jiacuo	9	
1964	3rd	Ma Jinxiao, Ma Mingji, Ma Hairu, Ma Lugeya, Wang Zhao, Basang Zhuoma, Zhaxi Wangxu, Shenggen Dajie, Liu Xiumei, Mi Futang, Xianbatai, Sun Zengrong, Guan Baojia, Songbu, Luo Shijie, Gao Keting, Xia Ronggabu, Han Yingxuan	18	
1975	4th	Ma Wenliang, Ma Zhengshou, Lü Yanxiu (female), Yi Sheng, Li Lexian, Song Changgeng, Lu Quanfa, Lin Shengquan, Shang Yuqing (female), Zheng Wencai, Guan Baojia, He Yinglan (female), Reheli, Xi Yuanshou, Yan Qingyong, Dong Tianzhen, Han Yibula, Xue Hongfu, Xue Hui, Huo Yingfang	20	
1978	5th	Qieluo, Shi Wenshan, Bai Yunyou, Qiao Shengchun, Duoba, Jiang Lixiang, Di Zicai, Shen Yancun, Zhang Qinxiu, Ami, Guan Baojia, Zhao Yanhua, Xia Ronggabu, Peng Guangzhi, Dong Tianzhen, Han Yibula, Han Fucai, Tan Qilong, Dexi Cuomao, Pan Xuezhen, Bo Qian	21	
1983	6th	Ma Yumei, Ma Jinfu, Wang Yugui, Zha Dui, Zha Xiwangxu, Yin Daosheng, Kong Yaping, Shen Junyi, Lü Yichang, Li Keyuan, Yang Yuanbei, Song Lin, Zhang Wenhao, Zhou Jia, Hu Jiabin, Xia Ronggabu, Miao Shilin	17	
1988	7th	Ma Yufen, Ma Ziliha, Ma Jinfu, Wang Xiuqing, Zha Xiwangxu, Yin Daosheng, Li Fulu, Yang Shengjie, Song Ruixiang, Chen Yongda, Angmao, Huanjue Cailang, Banma Danzeng, Xia Ronggabu, Qian Guoying, Han Jinxiao, Tong Chengrong	17	
1993	8th	Ma Deliang, Wang Guangren, Wang Hanmin, Wang Jiping, Qiesheng, Yin Kesheng, Tian Chengping, Dajie, Ren Weidong, Liu Guangzhong, Yang Yanyin, Song Pengsheng, Angmao, Yue Shishu, Huan Juecailang, Gesang Qiuji, Tong Chengrong	17	
1998	9th	Ma Peihua, Ma Fuhai (Hui), Wang Hanmin, Deng Bentai (Tibetan), Bai Enpei, Ren Jinfu, Jiang Ge (Tibetan), Jiang Yu, Yang Feifei, Zhang Xiao, Zhuomaji (Tibetan), Huanjue Cailang (Tibetan), Gao Yonghong (Mongolian), Jiang Xinxiong, Jiang Jiemin, Han Shangwen (Salar), La Bingli (Hui), Bao Yizhi (Tu)	19	
2003	10th	Cai Fudan (Tibetan), Ma Fengsheng (Salar), Ma Jixiao (Hui), Wang Xiaoqing, Wang Ruzhen (female), Gongbao (Tibetan), Gongbaoshang (Tibetan), Gan Guojiang, Hua Jianmin, Duoji Cairang (Tibetan), Surong, Li Yulan (female, Tu), Zhang Shoucheng (Mongolian), Zhao Huayong, Zhao Leji, Bai Xiuhua (female, Hui), Yao Xiangcheng, Niang Maoxian (female, Tibetan), Huang Ligong, Jiang Jiemin, Cheng Su (female)	21	
2008	11th	Ma Fuhai (Hui), Wang Yuhu (Tibetan), Wang Cheng, Mao Xiaobing, Zhu Mingrui, Qiao Zhengxiao (Tu), Ren Maodong, Hua Fuzhou (female), Liu Ziqiang, Yan Jinhai (Tibetan), Li Chengbao, Song Xiuyan (female), Zhang Shoucheng (Mongolian), Bai Xiuhua (female, Hui), Luo Yulin, Nuoerde (Tibetan), Niang Maoxian (female, Tibetan), Jiang Shusheng, Han Yongdong (Salar), Cheng Su (female), Qiang Wei	21	
2013	12th	Wang Yubo, Wang Yuhu (Tibetan), Wang Yong, Deng Xiaohui, Nima Zhuoma (female, Tibetan), Bi Shengzhong, Ren Maodong, Ren Jianxin, Liu Li (female), Li Xiaosong, He Feng (Tu), Song Baoshan, Zong Yiping, Bai Xiuhua (female, Hui), Luo Huining, Nuo Weixing (Mongolian), Nuo Erde (Tibetan), Niang Maoxian (female, Tibetan), Han Yongdong (Salar), Cheng Su (female), Qiang Wei, Mu Dongsheng (Hui)	22	
2018	13th	Ma Yisifu (Salar), Ma Fuchang (Hui), Wang Yubo, Wang Guosheng, Wang Jianjun, Zhaxi Duojie (Tibetan), Kong Qingju (female, Tibetan), Baijia Zhaxi (Tibetan), Bi Shengzhong, Li Zaiyuan, Sha Feng (female, Hui), Zhang Yongli, Zhang Guangrong, Zhang Xiaorong, Ashengqing (female, Tu), Chen Xi, Meng Hai (Mongolian), Xiawu Zhuoma (female, Tibetan), Han Xiaowu, Cheng Lifeng, Teng Jiacai	21	
2023	14th	Ma Shigong, Ma Fuchang, Wang Huajie, Wang Guodong, Wang Liming, Renqing Zhaxi, Bi Shenglong, Qiao Yaqun, Liu Xiaorong, Liu Qifan, Liu Guoqiang, Xu Qingmin, Yun Hongwei, Li Gao, Wu Xiaojun, Wang Yang, Zhang Jingang, Di Qingyun, Xiawu Zhuoma, Guo Jinping, Dong Quanmin, Jiang Zhigang, Cai Qi, Luo Dongchuan	24	
