= Bukadaban Feng =

Mountain in Xinjiang and Qinghai, China

- Syn Qing Feng
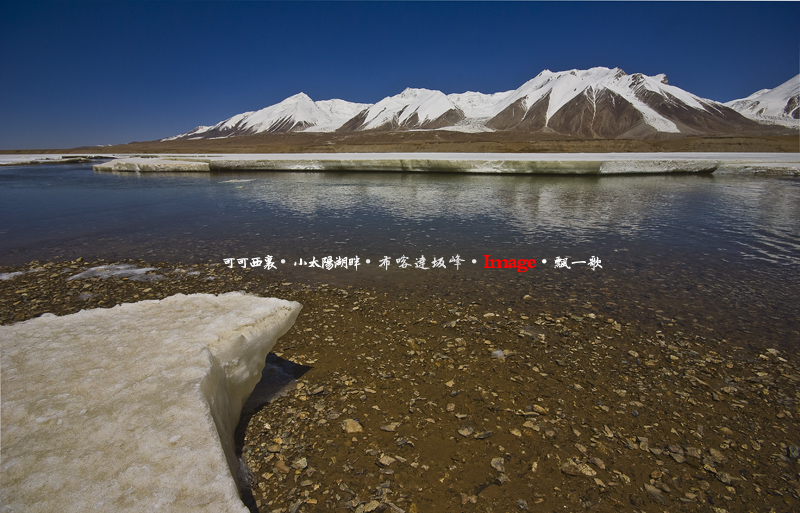

Highest point
- Elevation: 6,860 m (22,510 ft)
- Prominence: 1,922 m (6,306 ft)
- Listing: Ultra
- Coordinates: 36°01′27″N 90°51′57″E

Geography
- Location within China Location within Qinghai Location within Xinjiang
- Location: Xinjiang and Qinghai provinces, China
- Parent range: Kunlun Mountains

Bukadaban Feng or Buka Daban Feng (simplified Chinese: 布喀达坂峰; traditional Chinese: 布喀達坂峰; pinyin: Bùkā Dábǎn Fēng), Syn Qing Feng (Chinese: 新青峰; pinyin: Xīn Qīng Fēng) or Bokalik Tagh (Chinese: 博卡雷克塔格山; pinyin: Bókǎléikè Tǎgé Shān), is a remote peak on the border between Ruoqiang County, Xinjiang and Qinghai province of China. The Chinese term 'Bukadaban Feng' is borrowed from the Uyghur for "bison peak". It is part of the Kunlun Mountains of East-Central Asia. At 6,860 metres (22,507 ft) – the height 7,720 metres (25,328 ft) on older maps was incorrect – Bukadaban Feng is the highest point of the Qinghai province and with a prominence of 1,922 metres (6,306 ft), it is also an ultra prominent peak. The peak is considered part of Hoh Xil.

== See also ==
- List of ultras of Tibet, East Asia and neighbouring areas
