= Riyue Mountain =

Mountain in Qinghai, China

Coordinates: 36°33′50″N 100°59′35″E

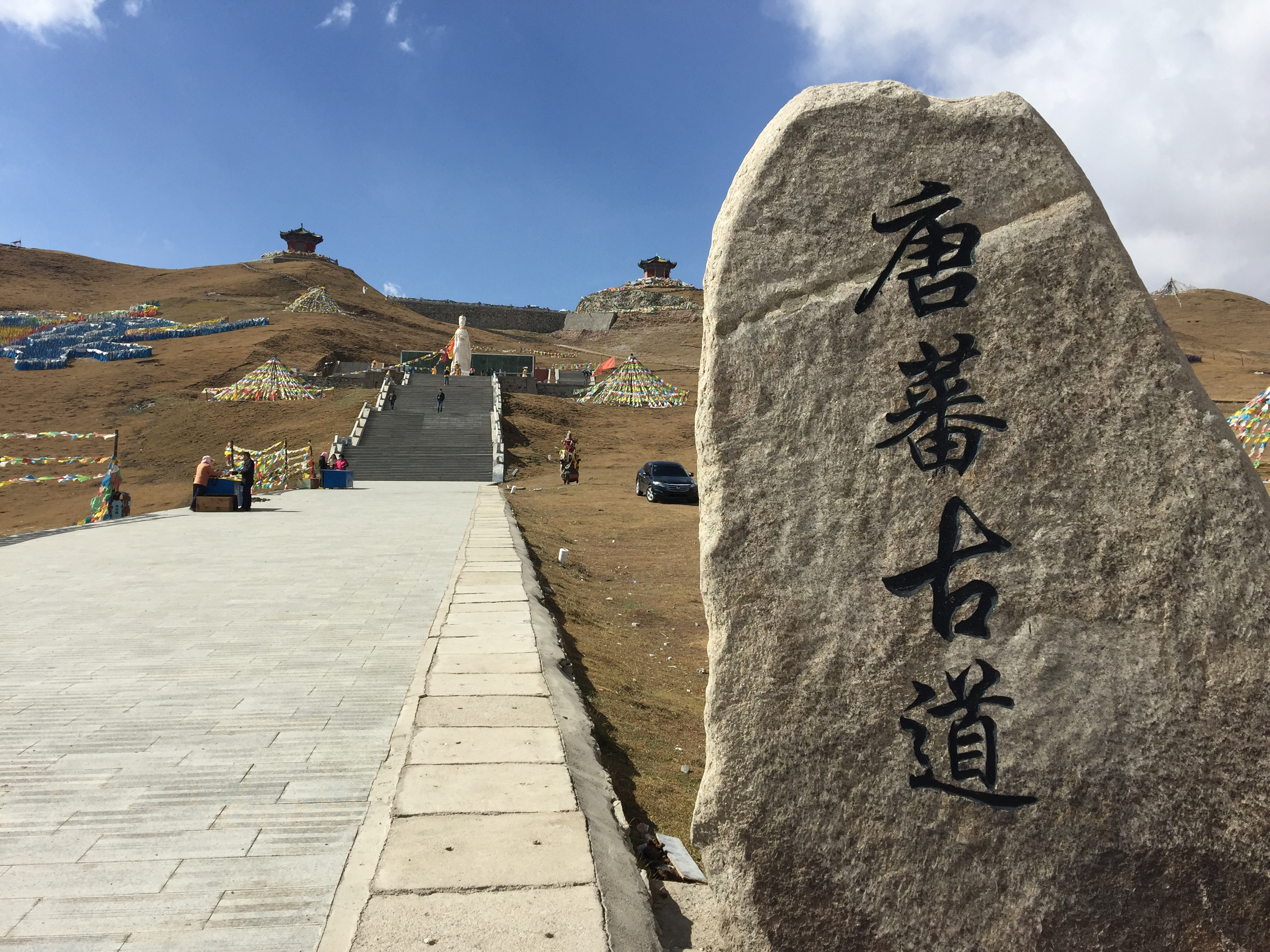
Princess Wencheng statue on Riyue Mountain

Riyue Mountain (Chinese: 日月山; pinyin: Rìyuè Shān; lit. 'Sun and moon mountain'), known in Tibetan as Nyima Dawa La (Tibetan: ཉི་མ་ཟླ་བ་ལ, Wylie: nyi ma zla wa la), is actually a mountain pass situated in Huangyuan County, Xining, Qinghai Province, China. The mountain pass is 3,399 m (11,152 ft) above sea level and separates the Qinghai Lake endorheic basin from the Huangshui River basin, a tributary of the Yellow River. The Daotang River (Chinese: 倒淌河; pinyin: Dàotǎng hé) flows west from the pass into Qinghai Lake. The pass separates Qinghai Province into a pastoral zone in the west and an agricultural zone in the east.

The mountain pass is currently crossed by China National Highway 214 that follows the ancient trade route into Tibet. It is also the historical Southern Silk Road and Tang-Tibet Ancient Road, and other roads must pass through and an important place where multi-ethnic groups live together.

== Legend ==
The Nyima Dawa La (pass) was made famous due to its association with the Han-Chinese Princess Wencheng when she was en route to marry Tibetan King Songtsen Gampo in the 7th century. She is said to have looked in a magic mirror here with a sun-moon design which was supposed to show her family in Chang'an. She only saw her own reflection and she smashed the mirror in despair. The Daotang River which, unusually in this region, flows east to west is said to have originated from the tears of the princess. Every year about the 6th day of the 6th lunar month a traditional Flower Song Festival (Ch. Huarhui) is held here. Two small new concrete temples have been built on the pass with modern murals showing the royal couple and scenes of nomadic life.

== Tongkor Monastery ==
Tongkor Monastery is a monastery, now mostly in ruins, that was located 8 km (5.0 mi) northeast of Riyue Mountain pass.
