= List of Major National Historical and Cultural Sites in Qinghai =

This list is of Major Sites Protected for their Historical and Cultural Value at the National Level in the Province of Qinghai, People's Republic of China.

Site	Chinese name	Location	Designation	Image
Kumbum Monastery	Ta'er si 塔尔寺	Huangzhong County 湟中县	1-111	Upload file
Qutan Temple	Qutan si 瞿昙寺	Ledu County 乐都县	2-34	Upload file
Machangyuan Site	Machangyuan yizhi 马厂塬遗址	Minhe Hui and Tu Autonomous County 民和县	3-191	Upload file
Xihai Ancient City	Xihai jun gucheng yizhi 西海郡故城遗址	Haiyan County 海晏县	3-212	Upload file
Reshui Tombs	Reshui muqun 热水墓群	Dulan County 都兰县	4-71	Upload file
Longwu Temple	Longwu si 隆务寺	Tongren County 同仁县	4-187	Upload file
Lajia Site	Lajia yizhi 喇家遗址	Minhe Hui and Tu Autonomous County 民和县	5-126	Upload file
Tawendaliha Site	Tawendaliha yizhi 塔温搭里哈遗址	Dulan County 都兰县	5-127	Upload file
Guide Confucian Temple and Yuhuang Pavilion	Guide wenmiao ji Yuhuang ge 贵德文庙及玉皇阁	Guide County 贵德县	5-437	Upload file
Zangniang Stupa and Sangzhou Temple	Zangniang Fota ji Sangzhou si 藏娘佛塔及桑周寺	Yushu County 玉树县	5-438	Upload file
China's first research center for nuclear weapons	Di-yi ge hewuqi yanzhi jidi jiuzhi 第一个核武器研制基地旧址	Haiyan County 海晏县	5-512	Upload file
Liuwan site	Liuwan yizhi 柳湾遗址	Ledu County 乐都县	6-211	Upload file
Shenna Site	Shenna yizhi 沈那遗址	Xining 西宁市	6-212	Upload file
Chorten of the Thirty Generals of Gesar of Ling and Dana Temple	Gesa'er sanshi da jiangjun Ling ta he Dana si 格萨尔三十大将军灵塔和达那寺	Nangqên County 囊谦县	6-805	Upload file
Chuzang Temple	Quezang si 却藏寺	Huzhu Tu Autonomous County 互助县	6-806	Upload file
Buddhist Cave Temples with Tubo Rock Sculptures and Carvings of Beinang-gou	Bei Darirulai Foshikusi he Lebagou moya 贝大日如来佛石窟寺和勒巴沟摩崖	Yushu Tibetan Autonomous Prefecture 玉树县	6-872	Upload file
Gyanak Mani in Xinzhai	Xinzhai Jiana mani 新寨嘉那嘛呢	Yushu Tibetan Autonomous Prefecture 玉树县	6-1074	Upload file
Former Site of the Western Route Army	Xunhua xilu hongjun geming jiuzhi 循化西路红军革命旧址	Xunhua Salar Autonomous County 循化县	6-1075	Upload file

== See also ==
- Principles for the Conservation of Heritage Sites in China
