= Huangyuan County =

Huangyuan 湟源县
- County
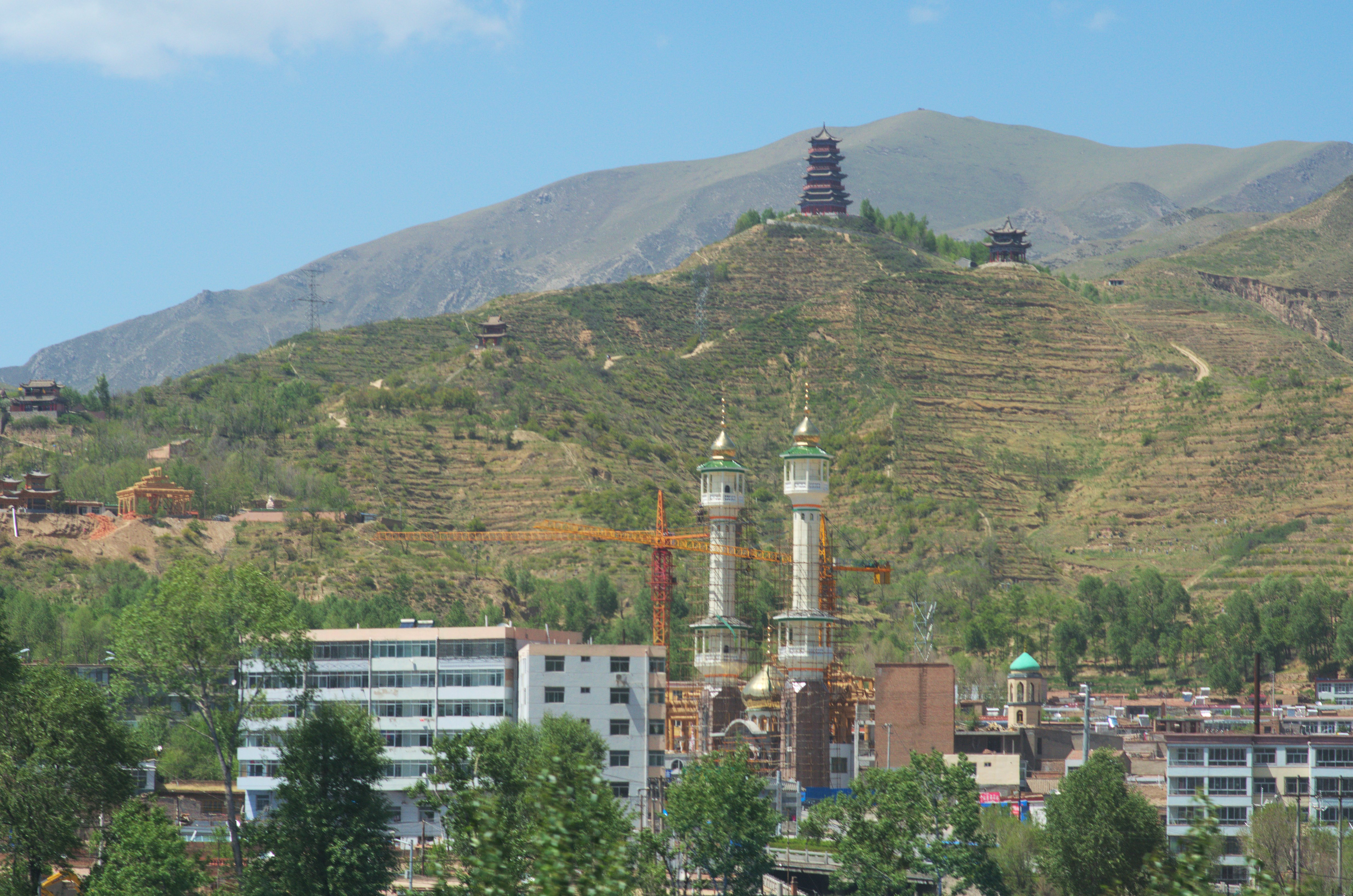
- Interactive map of Huangyuan
- Location of the seat in Qinghai
- Coordinates: 36.682°N 101.256°E
- Country: China
- Province: Qinghai
- Prefecture-level city: Xining
- Seat: Chengguan Town

Area
  - Total: 1,545 km^{2} (597 sq mi)

Population (2020)
  - Total: 109,802
  - Density: 71.07/km^{2} (184.1/sq mi)
- Time zone: UTC+8 (China Standard)

Huangyuan County

Chinese name
- Simplified Chinese: 湟源县
- Traditional Chinese: 湟源縣
Transcriptions
Standard Mandarin
- Hanyu Pinyin: Huángyuán Xiàn

Tibetan name
- Tibetan: སྟོང་སྐོར་རྫོང་།
Transcriptions
- Wylie: stong skor rdzong

Huangyuan County (Chinese: 湟源县) is a county of Qinghai Province, China, under the administration of the prefecture-level city of Xining, the capital of Qinghai. The county seat is Chengguan Town, known in Mongolian as Dan Gar and Tibetan as Tongkor.

The remains of Ladrolne Gompa and Rali Hermitage may be seen between Haiyan and Tongkor. A branch of Tongkor Monastery, known as Ganden Tengyeling (Ch. Cinghosi), just to the northwest of the Chengguan, is also in ruins.

== Subdivisions ==
Huangyuan County is divided into 2 towns, 6 townships, and 1 ethnic township:

- Chengguan Town (城关镇)
- Dahua Town (大华镇)
- Dongxia Township (东峡乡)
- Heping Township (和平乡)
- Bohang Township (波航乡)
- Shenzhong Township (申中乡)
- Bayan Township (巴燕乡)
- Sizhai Township (寺寨乡)
- Nyida Tibetan Ethnic Township (日月藏族乡, ཉི་ཟླ་བོད་རིགས་ཞང་།)

== Climate ==
Climate data for Huangyuan, elevation 2,675 m (8,776 ft), (1991–2020 normals, extremes 1991–present)
Month	Jan	Feb	Mar	Apr	May	Jun	Jul	Aug	Sep	Oct	Nov	Dec	Year
Record high °C (°F)	13.1 (55.6)	17.6 (63.7)	24.0 (75.2)	31.1 (88.0)	27.6 (81.7)	27.3 (81.1)	32.7 (90.9)	30.3 (86.5)	26.2 (79.2)	22.6 (72.7)	17.7 (63.9)	13.3 (55.9)	32.7 (90.9)
Mean daily maximum °C (°F)	1.1 (34.0)	4.3 (39.7)	9.2 (48.6)	14.2 (57.6)	17.3 (63.1)	20.2 (68.4)	22.0 (71.6)	21.5 (70.7)	17.0 (62.6)	12.5 (54.5)	6.7 (44.1)	2.1 (35.8)	12.3 (54.2)
Daily mean °C (°F)	−8.0 (17.6)	−4.3 (24.3)	0.8 (33.4)	6.4 (43.5)	10.0 (50.0)	13.6 (56.5)	15.5 (59.9)	14.9 (58.8)	10.8 (51.4)	5.1 (41.2)	−1.6 (29.1)	−6.8 (19.8)	4.7 (40.5)
Mean daily minimum °C (°F)	−15.1 (4.8)	−11.4 (11.5)	−6.1 (21.0)	−0.4 (31.3)	3.8 (38.8)	7.9 (46.2)	10.1 (50.2)	9.9 (49.8)	6.5 (43.7)	−0.1 (31.8)	−7.6 (18.3)	−13.6 (7.5)	−1.3 (29.6)
Record low °C (°F)	−26.6 (−15.9)	−25.4 (−13.7)	−18.3 (−0.9)	−12.0 (10.4)	−5.0 (23.0)	−1.2 (29.8)	−0.1 (31.8)	−0.7 (30.7)	−4.3 (24.3)	−13.6 (7.5)	−22.3 (−8.1)	−29.2 (−20.6)	−29.2 (−20.6)
Average precipitation mm (inches)	1.2 (0.05)	1.5 (0.06)	8.6 (0.34)	20.1 (0.79)	55.1 (2.17)	68.8 (2.71)	90.3 (3.56)	89.7 (3.53)	68.3 (2.69)	20.8 (0.82)	5.7 (0.22)	1.5 (0.06)	431.6 (17)
Average precipitation days (≥ 0.1 mm)	2.7	2.9	5.5	7.4	12.2	15.5	16.2	15.4	15.2	8.3	3.7	2.5	107.5
Average snowy days	4.5	6.0	7.8	5.5	1.5	0	0	0	0.3	4.2	5.5	3.8	39.1
Average relative humidity (%)	46	44	45	50	58	67	72	75	75	67	58	52	59
Mean monthly sunshine hours	214.6	211.8	242.5	243.3	239.3	225.7	223.9	211.9	178.9	206.1	212.9	208.6	2,619.5
Percentage possible sunshine	69	68	65	61	55	52	51	51	49	60	70	70	60
Source: China Meteorological Administration

== Tourist sites ==
- Dan Gar Ancient Town, the historic core of Chengguan Town, a historic trading town.
- Riyue Mountain and the remains of Tongkor Monastery, a mountain pass where Princess Wencheng supposedly traveled through in the 7th century CE.

== See also ==
- List of administrative divisions of Qinghai
