= Qinghai University Medical College =

Educational institution in China

Qinghai University Medical College (simplified Chinese: 青海大学医学院; traditional Chinese: 青海大學醫學院; pinyin: Qīnghǎi Yīxué Yuàn) is a university in Xining, Qinghai, China.
