= List of National Key Seismic Heritage Sites in China =

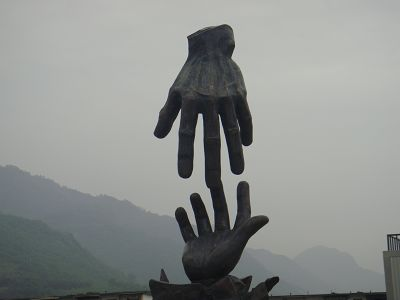
四川省绵竹市汉旺地震工业遗址纪念中心内的“大爱永生”雕塑（The "Great Love Endures Forever" sculpture in the Hanwang Earthquake Industrial Site Memorial Center of Mianzhu City, Sichuan Province）

National Key Seismic Heritage Sites are historical earthquake remains designated by the China Earthquake Administration under the Law of the People’s Republic of China on Protecting Against and Mitigating Earthquake Disasters. These sites are selected for their scientific value in earthquake research, their role in public education on disaster prevention and mitigation, and their long-term significance for seismic risk reduction.

The legal framework for establishing such sites was introduced in December 1997, when the Standing Committee of the Eighth National People’s Congress adopted the Earthquake Disaster Prevention and Mitigation Law. In 2001, the Qianjiang Xiaonanhai Paleoseismic Site in Chongqing became the first site designated at the national level, followed by five additional sites.

At present, the sites are located in four provincial-level administrative divisions of China: two in Shandong, two in Ningxia, and one each in Chongqing and Yunnan.

== Development history ==
On 29 December 1997, the Standing Committee of the Eighth National People’s Congress adopted the Law of the People’s Republic of China on Protecting Against and Mitigating Earthquake Disasters, which was promulgated by then President Jiang Zemin and came into force on 1 March 1998. The law covers earthquake prevention, preparedness, emergency response, and disaster relief. Article 42 of the law states that the state shall protect typical earthquake heritage sites and incorporate their preservation into post-disaster reconstruction planning. Scholars have noted that this provision serves as the legal basis for the designation of National Key Seismic Heritage Sites and ensures that representative earthquake remains are protected by law.

In 2001, the China Earthquake Administration approved the Qianjiang Xiaonanhai Paleoseismic Site as the first National Key Seismic Heritage Site. In 2005, the Yongsheng Hongshiyan Earthquake Tiankeng Site was approved as the second site. Three additional rounds of selection were conducted in 2006, 2007, and 2008, during which four more sites were designated. As a result, the total number of National Key Seismic Heritage Sites established by the China Earthquake Administration reached six.

== Evaluation criteria ==
According to regulations issued by the China Earthquake Administration, a National Key Seismic Heritage Site must meet at least one of the following criteria:

- Sites with research value for seismic fortification, including typical buildings, structures, and remains that were destroyed, damaged, or preserved during earthquakes.
- Sites with scientific value for earthquake research, such as important seismic faults and locations showing changes in landforms and topography caused by earthquakes.
- Sites with research value for disaster prevention strategies and significant educational and warning functions.
- Historic buildings that have survived past earthquakes and possess important historical documentation value.

In accordance with the Law of the People’s Republic of China on Protecting Against and Mitigating Earthquake Disasters, government agencies, organizations, and individuals may propose the protection of earthquake heritage sites to county-level or higher People’s Governments in affected areas. The earthquake administrative departments of these governments then compile the proposals, organize expert evaluations, and submit the results to the China Earthquake Administration for approval. Only after approval can a site be officially announced as a National Key Seismic Heritage Site.

== List of Sites ==
| Name | Location | Earthquake date | Year designated | Site type | Description |
|---|---|---|---|---|---|
| Qianjiang Xiaonanhai Paleoseismic Site | Chongqing, Qianjiang District | 10 June 1856 | 2001 | Barrier lake site | Formed by the 1856 Qianjiang earthquake, this is a preserved earthquake-dammed lake. The lake covers about 2.87 km² with a storage capacity of about 70.2 million m³. Located within the fold belt of eastern Chongqing and western Hubei, the site has a metamorphic rock basement dominated by shale and siltstone. The original state of the quake-dammed lake has been well preserved, retaining key evidence of the historical earthquake and providing significant scientific research value. |
| Yongsheng Hongshiyan Earthquake Tiankeng Site | Yunnan, Lijiang, Yongsheng County | 17 June 1515 | 2005 | Fault site | A geological fault site created by the 1515 Beisheng earthquake. The tiankeng is horseshoe-shaped, consisting of a pit over 200 m deep connected to a narrow valley about 300 m deep, with a total depth of about 500 m. It is one of the most representative remains of the Yongbei earthquake and has important scientific research value. |
| Tancheng Maipo Active Fault Site | Shandong, Linyi, Tancheng County | 25 July 1668 | 2006 | Fault site | A geological fault site from the 1668 Shandong earthquake. Located in the central Tan–Lu fault zone, this section provides the best exposure and most typical profile. The exposed section extends about 2,600 m north–south and 190 m east–west. Soils on either side differ significantly, representing Mesozoic red soils and Cenozoic dark brown soils, giving the site major scientific value. |
| Zaozhuang Xiongershan Landslide and Fissure Site | Shandong, Zaozhuang, Shanting District | 25 July 1668 | 2007 | Landslide site | A landslide site related to the 1668 Shandong earthquake. About 80 km from the epicenter, the mountain experienced severe earthquake damage, including landslides and rock collapses. The site preserves clear traces of secondary geological disasters and has research and educational value. |
| Xiji Dangjiacha Landslide-Dammed Lake Site | Ningxia, Guyuan, Xiji County | 16 December 1920 | 2006 | Barrier lake site | Formed by the Haiyuan earthquake, this dammed lake has an area of about 1.866 million m² and a storage capacity of about 11.2 million m³. It is part of a chain of 43 lakes and is the second-largest earthquake-formed lake in the world. |
| Haiyuan Earthquake Heritage Site | Ningxia, Zhongwei, Haiyuan County | 16 December 1920 | 2008 | Composite site | A cultural and geological heritage site from the Haiyuan earthquake. It includes multiple relic sites within a 240 km radius of the epicenter, such as fault valleys, dammed lakes, and cultural remains including mass graves, with major scientific and historical value. |

== Preservation of Remains ==
The Standing Committee of the National People's Congress compiled the Interpretation of the Law on Protecting Against and Mitigating Earthquake Disasters, which states that “typical earthquake sites and relics are important historical and cultural heritage under permanent national protection, and all units and individuals have the obligation to protect them in accordance with the law.” National-level typical earthquake sites are crucial for understanding earthquake patterns, improving monitoring and forecasting capabilities, and advancing disaster prevention and mitigation. Researchers emphasize that archaeological investigation of these sites not only uncovers earthquake history but also supports the emerging field of earthquake archaeology. Ye Maolin, from the Institute of Archaeology of the Chinese Academy of Social Sciences, explains that studying patterns in earthquake changes and development enables estimation of future earthquake probabilities, providing key data for prediction. Lin Xiang, of Sichuan University, adds that tracking changes in the distribution of archaeological materials—such as ancient ruins, villages, and tombs—offers an effective way to study historical earthquakes.

Article 43 of the Law on Protecting Against and Mitigating Earthquake Disasters, in its second paragraph, stipulates penalties for damaging national-level typical earthquake sites. Earthquake administrative authorities at all levels may impose fines of up to 100,000 yuan for damage to such sites and pursue criminal liability in accordance with the law. However, some reports indicate that the protection status of certain national-level typical earthquake sites is worrying, as they face both natural weathering and human destruction. Journalists have found that gullies at some earthquake fault sites have even been reclaimed by nearby villagers for farming. Some local earthquake authorities have also called for greater attention to protecting earthquake sites and indicated that the next step will involve either closed, focused protection of these sites or the establishment of earthquake site museums.
