= Haiyan County, Qinghai =

Haiyan County 海晏县 · ཧའེ་ཡན་རྫོང་།
- County
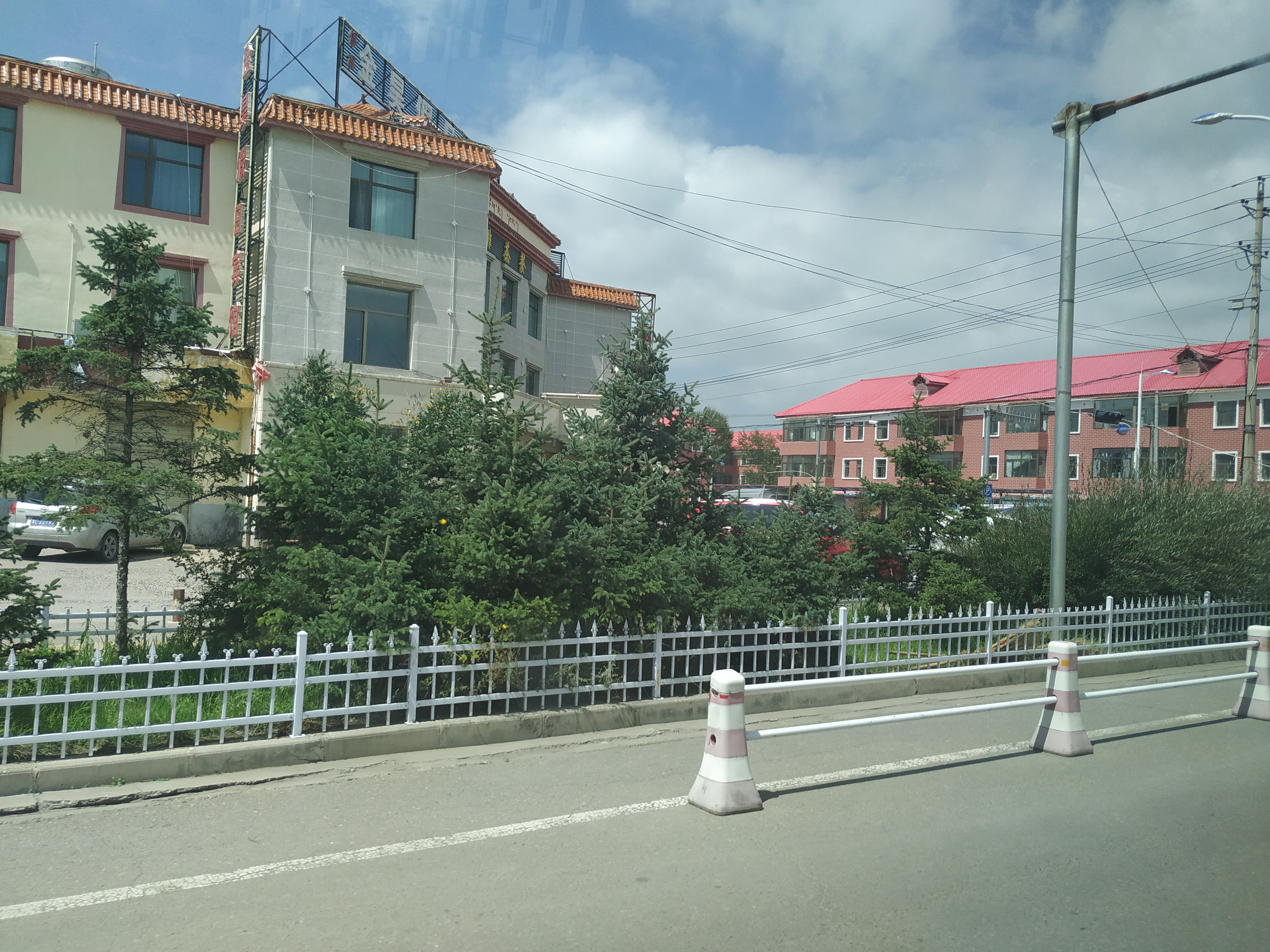
- Town of Xihai

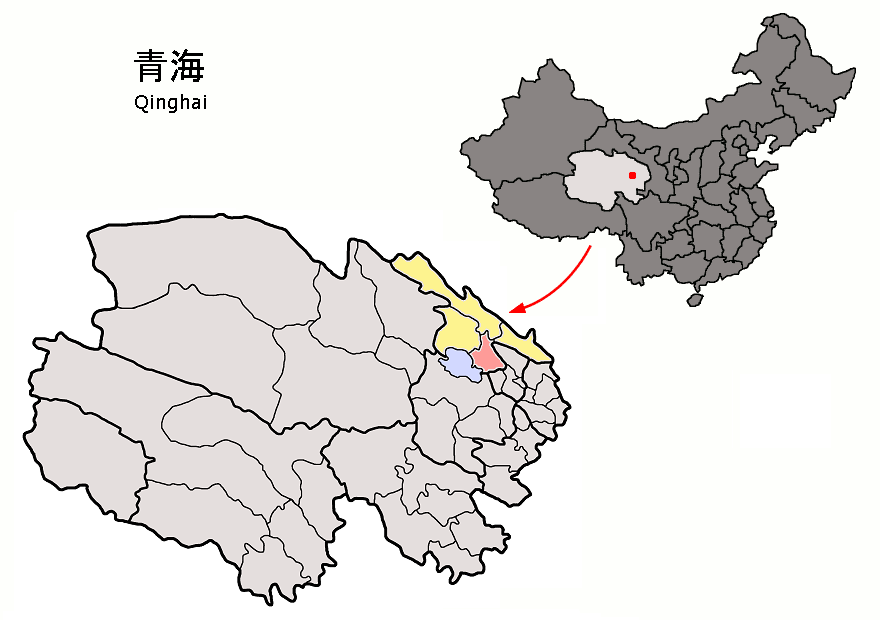
- Location of Haiyan County (red) within Haibei Prefecture (yellow) and Qinghai province

- Location of the seat in Qinghai
- Coordinates: 36°53′48″N 100°59′40″E
- Country: China
- Province: Qinghai
- Autonomous prefecture: Haibei
- County seat: Sanjiaocheng Town

Area
  - Total: 4,443.1 km^{2} (1,715.5 sq mi)

Population (2020)
  - Total: 37,729
  - Density: 8.4916/km^{2} (21.993/sq mi)
- Time zone: UTC+8 (China Standard)
- Division code: HIY
- Website: www.haiyanxian.gov.cn

Haiyan County, Qinghai

Chinese name
- Simplified Chinese: 海晏县
- Traditional Chinese: 海晏縣
Transcriptions
Standard Mandarin
- Hanyu Pinyin: Hǎiyàn Xiàn

Tibetan name
- Tibetan: ཧའེ་ཡན་རྫོང་།
Transcriptions
- Wylie: ha'e yan rdzong
- Tibetan Pinyin: Ha'êyan Zong

Mongolian name
- Mongolian script: ᠬᠠᠢᠶᠠᠨ ᠰᠢᠶᠠᠨ

Haiyan County (Chinese: 海晏县; Tibetan: ཧའེ་ཡན་རྫོང་།) is a county of Qinghai Province, China, located on the northeast shore of Qinghai Lake. It is under the administration of Haibei Tibetan Autonomous Prefecture.

== History ==
A major nuclear research facility, Plant 221 (221厂), better known as China's First Research Center for Nuclear Weapons (中国第一个核武器研制基地), was established in 1958 at the location called Jinyintan (金银滩) in Haiyan County. The site has been on the List of Major National Historical and Cultural Sites in Qinghai since 2001.

== Administrative divisions ==
Haiyan County is made up of 2 towns, 3 townships, and 1 ethnic township:

Name	Simplified Chinese	Hanyu Pinyin	Tibetan	Wylie	Administrative division code	Notes
Towns
Sanjiaocheng Town (Karsursum Town)	三角城镇	Sānjiǎochéng Zhèn	མཁར་ཟུར་གསུམ་གྲོང་རྡལ།	mkhar zur gsum grong rdal	632223100	
Xihai Town (Rubco Town)	西海镇	Xīhǎi Zhèn	རུབ་མཚོ་གྲོང་རྡལ།	rub mtsho grong rdal	632223101	
Townships
Jintan Township (Sêrtang Township)	金滩乡	Jīntān Xiāng	གསེར་ཐང་ཞང་།	gser thang zhang	632223200	
Qinghaihu Township (Co'ngoinbo Township)	青海湖乡	Qīnghǎihú Xiāng	མཚོ་སྔོན་པོ་ཞང་།	mtsho sngon po zhang	632223202	
Ganjig Township (Wa'gyog Township, Ganzihe Township)	甘子河乡	Gānzǐhé Xiāng	ཝ་མགྱོགས་ཞང་།	wa mgyogs zhang	632223203	
Ethnic township
Haljin Mongol Ethnic Township (Bai'gyain Township)	哈勒景蒙古族乡	Hālèjǐng Ménggǔzú Xiāng	དཔལ་རྒྱན་ཞང་།	dpal rgyan zhang	632223201	(Mongolian) ᠬᠠᠯᠵᠢᠨ ᠮᠣᠩᠭᠣᠯ ᠦᠨᠳᠦᠰᠦᠲᠡᠨ ᠦ ᠰᠤᠮᠤᠨ

== Climate ==
Climate data for Haiyan, elevation 3,010 m (9,880 ft), (1991–2020 normals, extremes 1991–present)
Month	Jan	Feb	Mar	Apr	May	Jun	Jul	Aug	Sep	Oct	Nov	Dec	Year
Record high °C (°F)	9.1 (48.4)	14.1 (57.4)	20.8 (69.4)	27.2 (81.0)	24.6 (76.3)	25.1 (77.2)	30.5 (86.9)	27.9 (82.2)	24.2 (75.6)	22.0 (71.6)	15.2 (59.4)	9.8 (49.6)	30.5 (86.9)
Mean daily maximum °C (°F)	−2.0 (28.4)	1.6 (34.9)	6.2 (43.2)	11.3 (52.3)	14.8 (58.6)	17.6 (63.7)	19.6 (67.3)	19.1 (66.4)	15.1 (59.2)	10.0 (50.0)	4.5 (40.1)	−0.2 (31.6)	9.8 (49.6)
Daily mean °C (°F)	−12.6 (9.3)	−8.4 (16.9)	−2.8 (27.0)	3.2 (37.8)	7.3 (45.1)	10.8 (51.4)	12.9 (55.2)	12.1 (53.8)	8.0 (46.4)	1.7 (35.1)	−5.6 (21.9)	−11.1 (12.0)	1.3 (34.3)
Mean daily minimum °C (°F)	−21.2 (−6.2)	−16.9 (1.6)	−10.3 (13.5)	−4.0 (24.8)	0.5 (32.9)	4.4 (39.9)	6.7 (44.1)	6.3 (43.3)	2.7 (36.9)	−4.4 (24.1)	−12.9 (8.8)	−19.4 (−2.9)	−5.7 (21.7)
Record low °C (°F)	−31.1 (−24.0)	−29.6 (−21.3)	−24.2 (−11.6)	−16.7 (1.9)	−8.6 (16.5)	−3.7 (25.3)	−1.4 (29.5)	−3.3 (26.1)	−7.2 (19.0)	−18.0 (−0.4)	−27.8 (−18.0)	−33.7 (−28.7)	−33.7 (−28.7)
Average precipitation mm (inches)	1.1 (0.04)	1.3 (0.05)	6.3 (0.25)	18.7 (0.74)	44.3 (1.74)	67.7 (2.67)	91.3 (3.59)	93.2 (3.67)	65.3 (2.57)	17.7 (0.70)	5.1 (0.20)	1.8 (0.07)	413.8 (16.29)
Average precipitation days (≥ 0.1 mm)	2.5	2.4	5.1	6.9	12.3	15.4	16.4	15.8	15.2	8.5	3.6	2.7	106.8
Average snowy days	4.4	5.3	7.9	7.3	5.0	0.6	0.2	0.2	0.7	6.9	5.1	4.5	48.1
Average relative humidity (%)	53	50	50	53	59	65	71	74	74	67	60	57	61
Mean monthly sunshine hours	237.1	229.6	259.1	259.1	257.4	234.2	239.7	237.4	207.0	229.8	234.7	233.4	2,858.5
Percentage possible sunshine	76	74	69	65	58	54	54	57	56	67	78	78	66
Source: China Meteorological Administration

== See also ==
- List of administrative divisions of Qinghai
