= Tectonic summary of Qinghai =

The southern Qinghai Province, China earthquake of April 13, 2010 occurred as a result of strike-slip faulting in the tectonically complex region of the eastern Tibetan Plateau. This earthquake occurred several hundred kilometers north of the convergent India-Eurasia plate boundary, where the Indian Plate is moving northwards with respect to Eurasia at a rate of approximately 46 mm/yr. This convergence drives the uplift of the Himalaya Mountains, at a rate of approximately 10 mm/yr, and the Tibetan Plateau, which is an extremely broad region of thickened and uplifted crust sitting above 4.5–5 km.

In the region of the April 13 earthquake the Tibetan Plateau is extending and translating east-southeastward within a larger zone of generally north–south convergence. Based on the location, depth, and moment tensor of the event, the Qinghai Province earthquake likely reflects the interplay amongst these major tectonic forces, dominated in this location by southeastward translation. The eastward motion of Tibet with respect to Eurasia further north is accommodated in part by the large intra-continental Altyn Tagh and Kunlun strike-slip fault systems. Several large historic events in the Qinghai Province have occurred on the Kunlun fault, which runs west–east approximately 300 km to the north of the April 13 event. The April 13 earthquake is one of the largest known historic earthquakes within several hundred kilometers of its location. In 1738, a nearby earthquake of approximately magnitude 6.5 caused over 300 fatalities.

== See also ==
- 2010 Yushu earthquake
