= Qinghai =

Province of China

Qinghai 青海 Tsinghai
- Province
- Province of Qinghai

Name transcription(s)
  - Chinese: 青海省 (Qīnghǎi Shěng)
  - Abbreviation: QH / 青 (pinyin: Qīng)
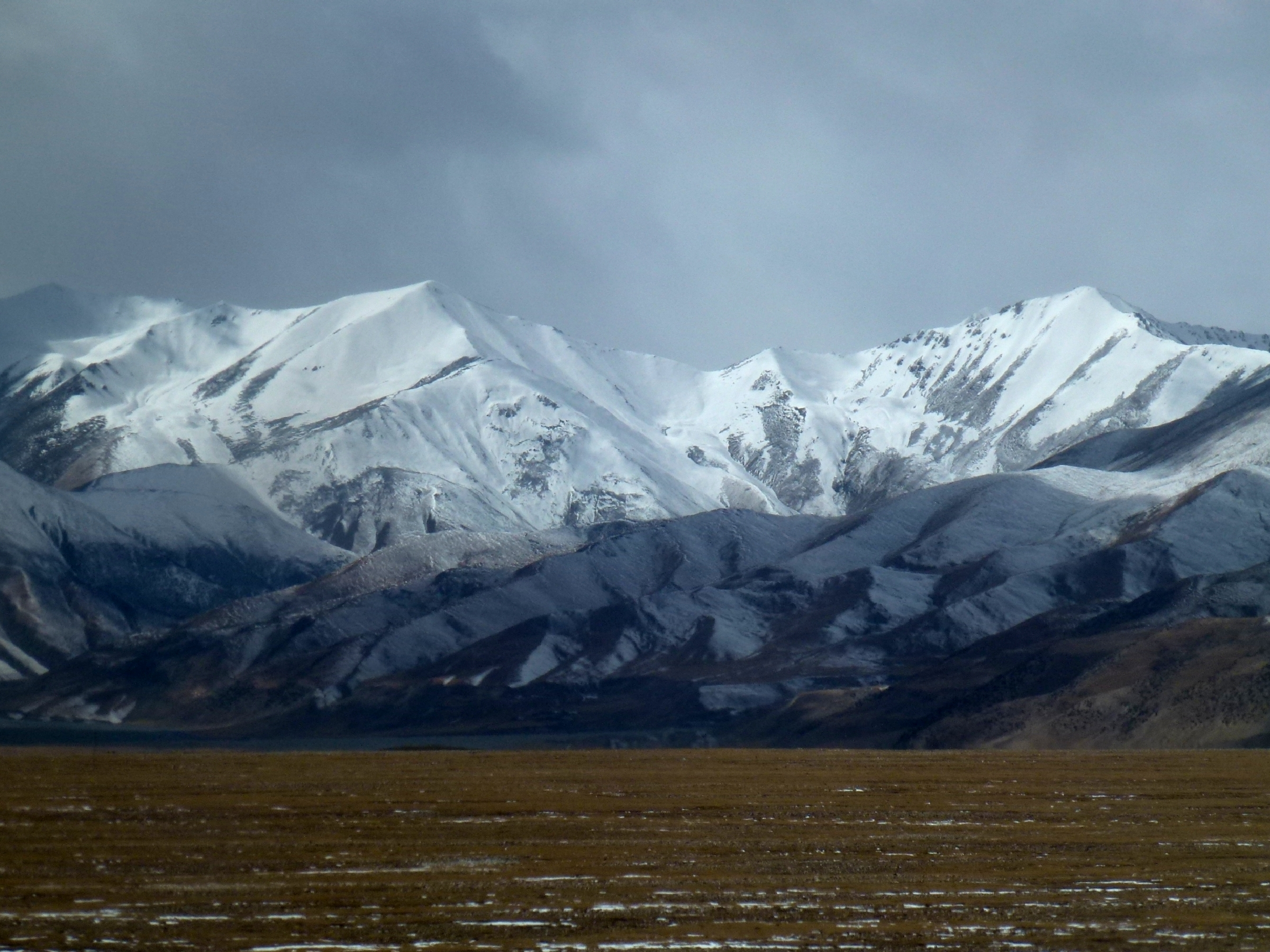
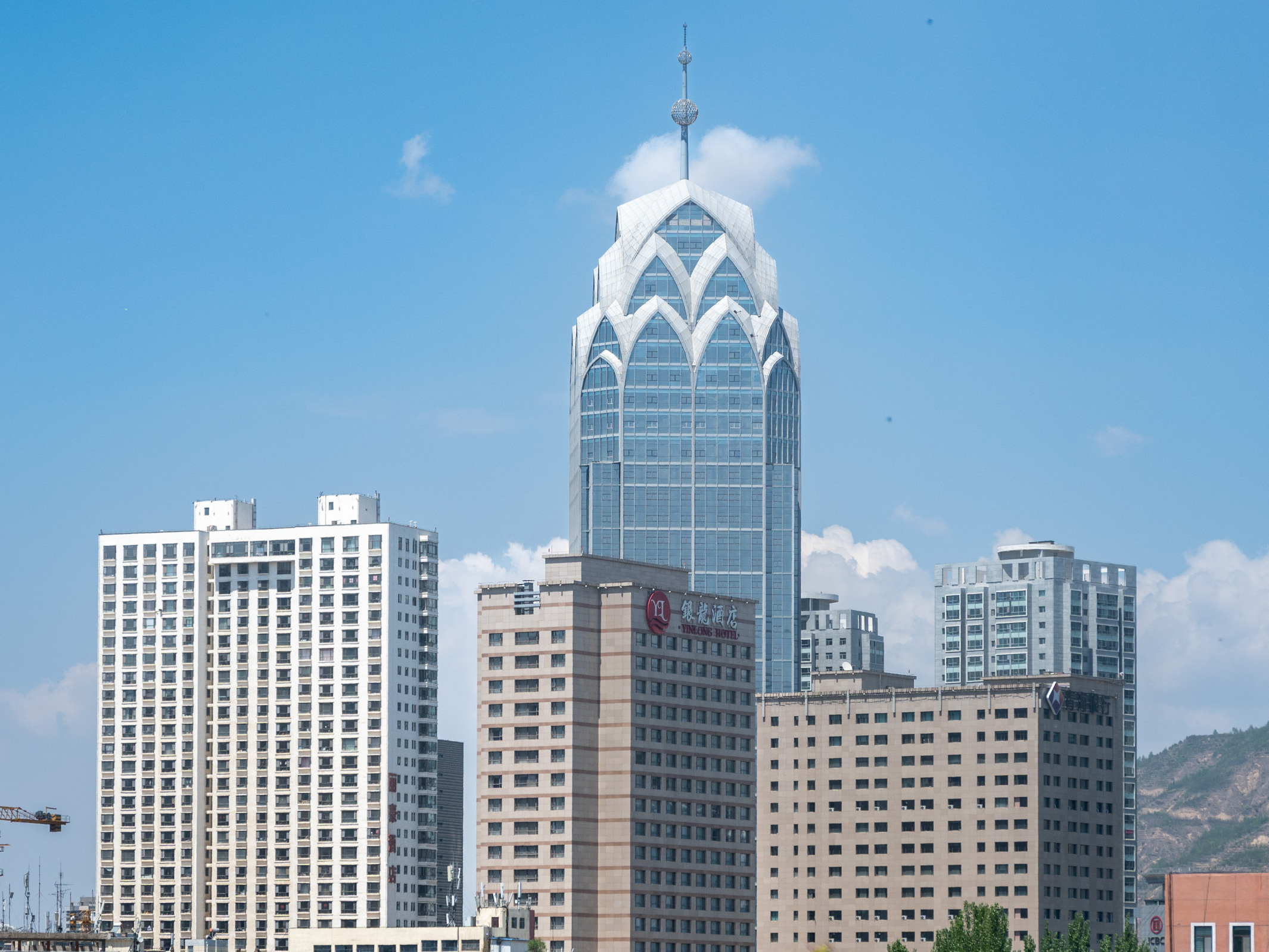
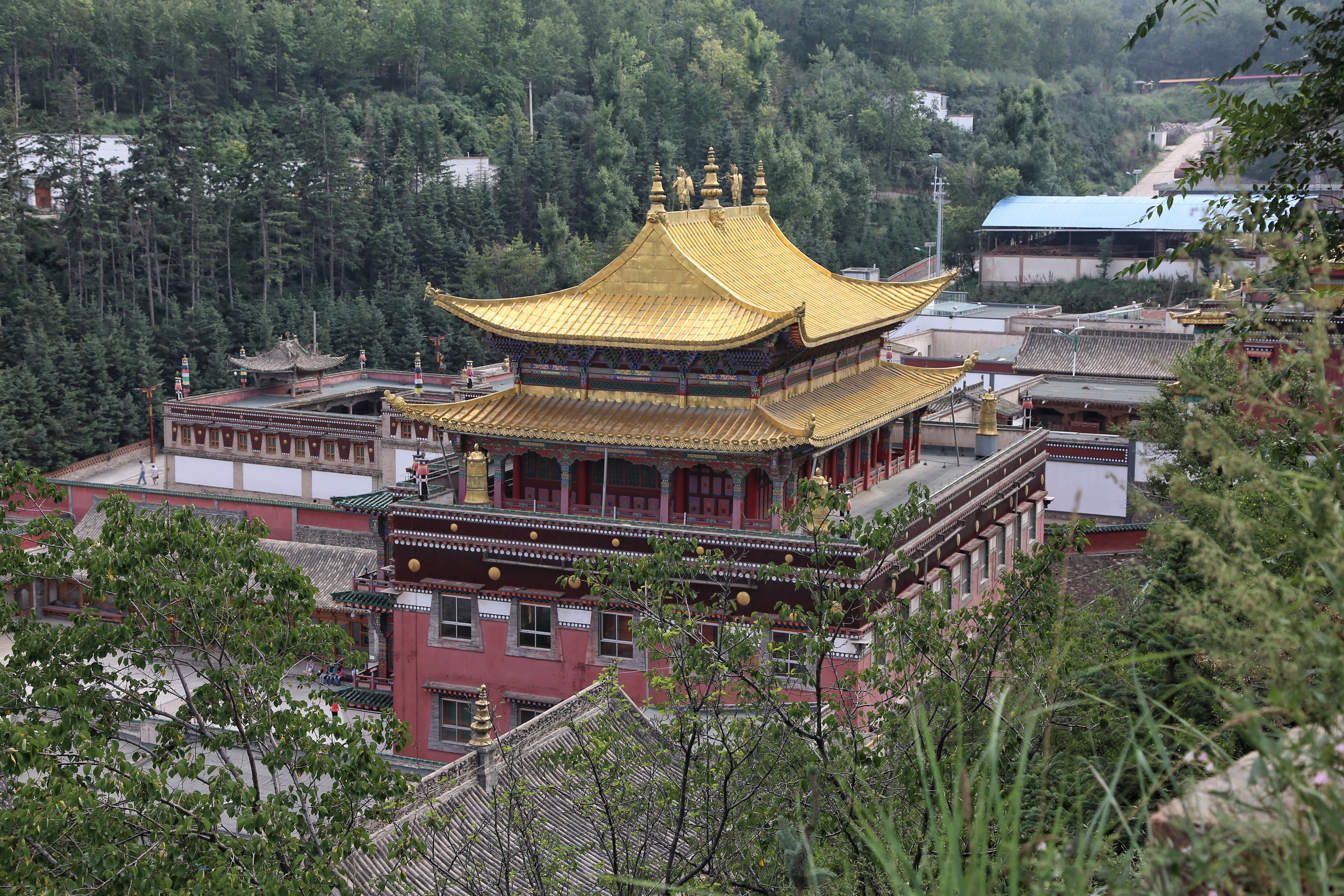
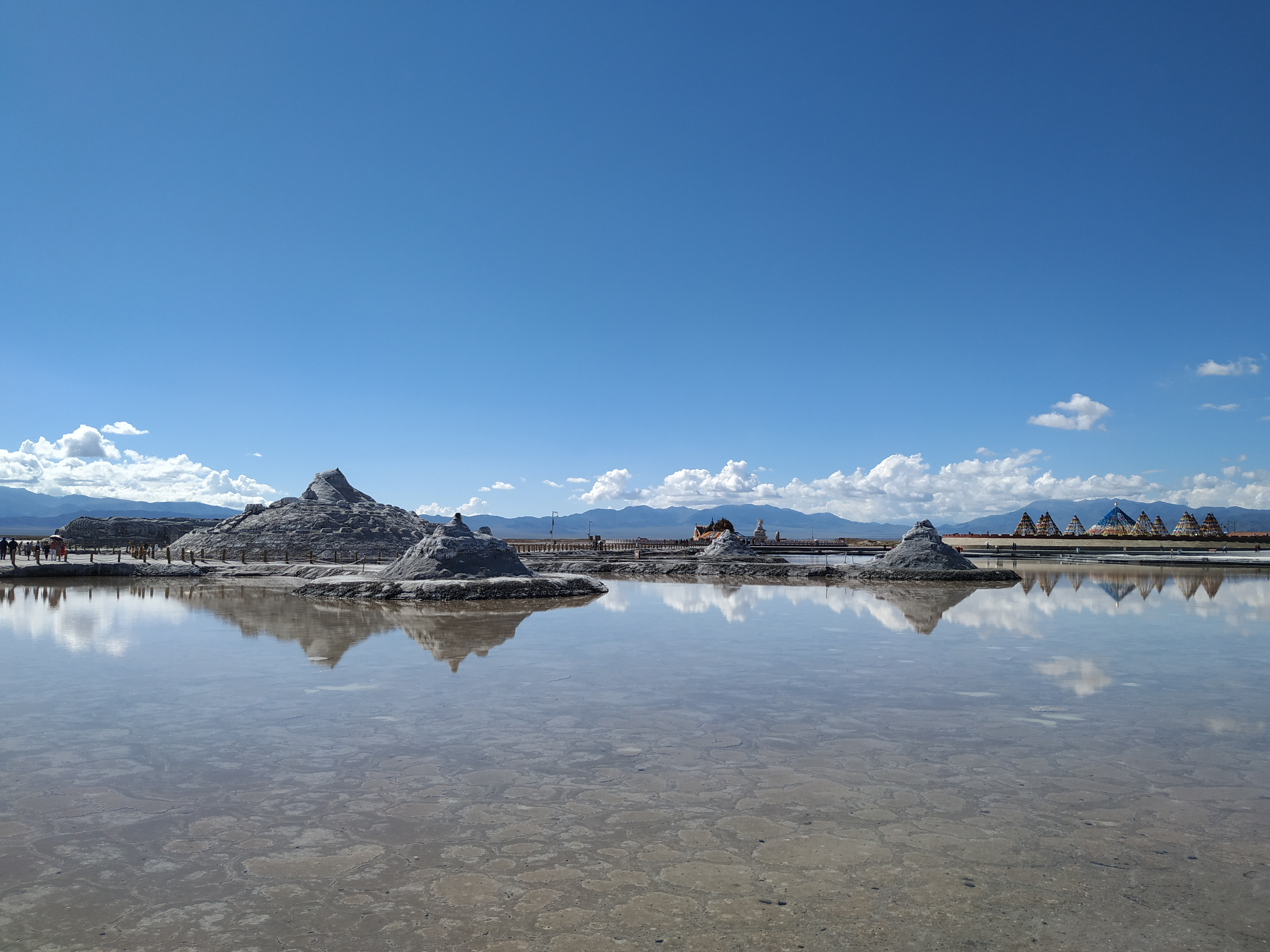
- Hoh Xil Downtown Xining Kumbum Monastery Chaka Salt Lake

- Map showing the location of Qinghai Province
- Coordinates: 35°N 96°E
- Country: China
- Named for: Derived from the name of Qinghai Lake ("blue/green lake").
- Capital (and largest city): Xining
- Divisions: Prefecture-level; County-level; Township-; level: 8 prefectures 44 counties 404 towns and subdistricts

Government
  - Body: Qinghai Provincial People's Government
  - Party Secretary: Luo Dongchuan
  - Congress Chairman: Luo Dongchuan
  - Governor: Zhuge Yujie
  - Provincial CPPCC Chairman: Gönbo Zhaxi
  - National People's Congress Representation: 24 deputies

Area
  - Total: 722,300 km^{2} (278,900 sq mi)
  - Rank: 4th
- Highest elevation (Bukadaban Feng): 6,860 m (22,510 ft)

Population (2020)
  - Total: 5,923,957
  - Rank: 31st
  - Density: 8.202/km^{2} (21.24/sq mi)
  - Rank: 30th

Demographics
  - Ethnic composition: Han – 54% Tibetan – 21% Hui – 16% Tu – 4% Mongol – 1.8% Salar – 1.8%
  - Languages and dialects: Zhongyuan Mandarin Chinese, Amdo Tibetan, Monguor, Oirat Mongolian, Salar and Western Yugur

GDP (2025)
  - Total: CN¥ 412.2 billion (30th); US$ 57,705 billion
  - Per capita: CN¥ 69,567 (24th); US$ 9,739
- ISO 3166 code: CN-QH
- HDI (2023): 0.727 (30th) – high
- Website: www.qh.gov.cn (in Chinese)

Qinghai
- "Qinghai" in Chinese characters

Chinese name
- Chinese: 青海
- Postal: Tsinghai
- Literal meaning: "Qinghai (Lake)"
Transcriptions
Standard Mandarin
- Hanyu Pinyin: Qīnghǎi
- Bopomofo: ㄑㄧㄥ ㄏㄞˇ
- Gwoyeu Romatzyh: Chinghae
- Wade–Giles: Chʻing^{1}-hai^{3}
- Tongyong Pinyin: Cinghǎi
- IPA: [tɕʰíŋ.xàɪ]
Wu
- Romanization: Tshin^{平}-he^{上}
Hakka
- Romanization: Tshiâng-hói
Yue: Cantonese
- Yale Romanization: Chīnghói
- Jyutping: cing1 hoi2
- IPA: [tsʰɪŋ˥ hɔj˧˥]
Southern Min
- Hokkien POJ: Chheng-hái
- Tâi-lô: Tsheng-hái

Tibetan name
- Tibetan: མཚོ་སྔོན།
Transcriptions
- Wylie: mtsho sngon

Mongolian name
- Mongolian Cyrillic: Хөхнуур
- Mongolian script: ᠬᠥᠬᠡ ᠨᠠᠭᠤᠷ
Transcriptions
- SASM/GNC: Köke naɣur

Manchu name
- Manchu script: ᡥᡠᡥᡠ ᠨᠣᠣᡵ
- Romanization: Huhu Noor

Oirat name
- Oirat: Kokonur

Qinghai (Note: /tʃɪŋˈhaɪ/ ching-HY; Chinese: 青海, IPA: [tɕʰíŋ.xàɪ]; alternately romanized as Tsinghai or Chinghai)) is an inland province in Northwestern China. It is the largest province of China (excluding autonomous regions) by area and has the third-smallest population, with its capital and largest city being Xining. Qinghai borders Gansu on the northeast, Xinjiang on the northwest, Sichuan on the southeast, and the Tibet Autonomous Region on the southwest. It is named after Qinghai Lake, the largest lake in China.

The modern province contains most of the traditional Tibetan region of Amdo. In Tibetan, the Qinghai Lake is known as མཚོ སྔོན་པོ (Mtsho-sngon-po) or Tso ngönpo ("Blue Lake or Sea"). In English, it is sometimes referred to as Koko Nor, derived from the Classical Mongolian Oirat name for Qinghai Lake, ᠬᠥᠬᠡ ᠨᠠᠭᠤᠷ (köke naɣur); the modern Mongolian name is Хөхнуур (Höhnuur). Both Tso ngönpo and Koko Nor are names found in historic documents to describe the region. It is located mostly on the Tibetan Plateau.

The area of Qinghai came under the control of the Manchu-led Qing dynasty around 1724, after their defeat of Khoshut Mongols who previously controlled most of the area. After the Xinhai Revolution and the ensuing fall of the Qing dynasty in 1912, Qinghai came under Chinese Muslim warlord Ma Qi's control until the Northern Expedition by the Republic of China consolidated central control in 1928. In the same year, the province of Qinghai was established by the Nationalist Government, with Xining as its capital. Until 1949 was ruled by Hui Chinese Muslim warlords known as the Ma clique.

The province is inhabited by a number of peoples including the Han (concentrated in the provincial capital of Xining, nearby Haidong, and Haixi), Tibetans, Hui, Mongols, Monguors, and Salars. According to the 2021 census reports, Tibetans constitute a fifth of the population of Qinghai and the Hui compose roughly a sixth of the population. There are over 37 recognized ethnic groups among Qinghai's population of 5.6 million, with ethnic minorities making up a total of 49.5% of the population.

== History ==
During the Bronze Age, Qinghai was home to a diverse group of nomadic tribes closely related to other Central Asians who traditionally made a living in agriculture and husbandry, the Kayue culture. The eastern part of the area of Qinghai was under the control of the Han dynasty about 2,000 years ago. It was a battleground during the Tang and subsequent Central Plain dynasties when they fought against successive Tibetan tribes.

In the middle of 3rd century CE, nomadic people related to the Mongolic Xianbei migrated to pasture lands around the Qinghai Lake (Koko Nur) and established the Tuyuhun Kingdom.

In the 7th century, the Tuyuhun Kingdom was attacked by both the Tibetan Empire and the Tang dynasty as both sought control over the Silk Road trade routes. Tibetan King Songtsen Gampo was victorious, and settled the area around Tso ngon (Lake Go, or Kokonor Lake). Military conflicts had severely weakened the Tuyuhun kingdom and it was incorporated into the Tibetan Empire. The Tibetan Empire continued expanding beyond Tso ngon during Trisong Detsen's and Ralpachen's reigns, and the empire controlled vast areas north and east of Tso ngon until 848, which included Xi'an.

During the fragmentation of the Tibetan Empire, a series of local polities emerged under the political jostling of Western Xia to the north and Song dynasty to the east – from the military-rule of Guiyi Circuit, to a Tibetan tribal confederacy, and eventually the Tibetan theocratic kingdom of Tsongkha. The Song dynasty eventually defeated the Kokonor kingdom Tsongkha in the 1070s. During the Mongol-led Yuan dynasty's administrative rule of Tibet, the region comprised the headwaters of the Ma chu (Machu River, Yellow River) and the Yalong (Yangtze) rivers and was known as Amdo, but apportioned to different administrative divisions than Tibet proper.

Most of Qinghai was, for a short time in the aftermath of the Yuan dynasty's overthrow, under the control of early Ming dynasty, but later gradually lost to the Khoshut Khanate founded by the Oirats. The Xunhua Salar Autonomous County is where most Salar people live in Qinghai. The Salars migrated to Qinghai from Samarkand in 1370. The chief of the four upper clans around this time was Han Pao-yuan and Ming granted him office of centurion, it was at this time the people of his four clans took Han as their surname. The other chief Han Shan-pa of the four lower Salar clans got the same office from Ming, and his clans were the ones who took Ma as their surname.

From 1640 to 1724, a big part of the area that is now Qinghai was under Khoshut Mongol control, but in 1724 it was conquered by the armies of the Qing dynasty. Xining, the capital of modern Qinghai province, began to function as the administrative center, although the city itself was then part of Gansu province within the "Tibetan frontier district". In 1724, the 13-Article Ordinance for the Effective Governing of Qinghai (Chinese: 青海善后事宜十三条) was proposed by Nian Gengyao and adopted by the Central Government to gain full control of Qinghai.

Under the Qing dynasty, the governor was a viceroy of the Emperor, but local ethnic groups enjoyed significant autonomy. Many chiefs retained their traditional authority, participating in local administrations. The Dungan Revolt (1862–1877) devastated the Hui Muslim population of Shaanxi, shifting the Hui center of population to Gansu and Qinghai. Another Dungan Revolt broke out in Qinghai in 1895 when various Muslim ethnic groups in Qinghai and Gansu rebelled against the Qing. Following the overthrow of the Qing dynasty in 1911, the region came under Chinese Muslim warlord Ma Qi control until the Northern Expedition by the Republic of China consolidated central control in 1928.

In July–August 1912, General Ma Fuxiang was "Acting Chief Executive Officer of Kokonur" (de facto Governor of the region that later became Qinghai). In 1928, Qinghai province was created. The Muslim warlord and General Ma Qi became military governor of Qinghai, followed by his brother Ma Lin and then Ma Qi's son Ma Bufang. In 1932 Tibet invaded Qinghai, attempting to capture southern parts of Qinghai province, following contention in Yushu, Qinghai, over a monastery in 1932. The army of Ma Bufang defeated the Tibetan armies. Governor of Qinghai Ma Bufang was described as a socialist by American journalist John Roderick and friendly compared to the other Ma Clique warlords. Ma Bufang was reported to be good humoured and jovial in contrast to the brutal reign of Ma Hongkui. Most of eastern China was ravaged by the Second Sino-Japanese War and the Chinese Civil War, by contrast, Qinghai was relatively untouched.

Ma Bufang increased the prominence of the Hui and Salar people in Qinghai's politics by heavily recruiting to his army from the counties in which those ethnic groups predominated. General Ma started a state run and controlled industrialization project, directly creating educational, medical, agricultural, and sanitation projects, run or assisted by the state. The state provided money for food and uniforms in all schools, state run or private. Roads and a theater were constructed. The state controlled all the press, no freedom was allowed for independent journalists.

As the 1949 Chinese revolution approached Qinghai, Ma Bufang abandoned his post and flew to Hong Kong, traveling abroad but never returning to China. On January 1, 1950, the Qinghai Province People's Government was declared, owing its allegiance to the new People's Republic of China. Aside from some minor adjustments to suit the geography, the PRC maintained the province's territorial integrity. Resistance to Communist rule continued in the form of the Huis' Kuomintang Islamic insurgency (1950–58), spreading past traditionally Hui areas to the ethnic-Tibetan south. Although the Hui composed 15.6% of Qinghai's population in 1949, making the province the second-largest concentration of Hui after Ningxia, the state denied the Hui ethnic autonomous townships and counties that their numbers warranted under Chinese law until the 1980s.

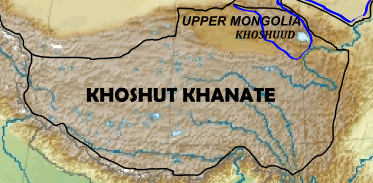
The Khoshut Khanate (1642–1717) based in the Tibetan Plateau

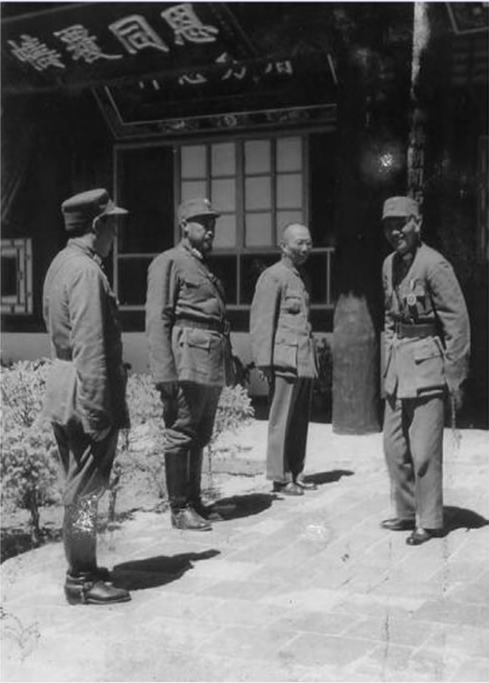
Chiang Kai-shek, leader of Nationalist China (right), meets with the Muslim generals Ma Bufang (second from left), and Ma Buqing (first from left) in Xining, Qinghai, in August 1942

== Geography ==
Qinghai is located on the northeastern part of the Tibetan Plateau. By area, it is the largest province in the People's Republic of China (excluding the autonomous regions).

The Yellow River originates in the southern part of the province, while the Yangtze and Mekong have their sources in the southwestern part. Qinghai is separated by the Riyue Mountain into pastoral and agricultural zones in the west and east.

The Sanjiangyuan National Nature Reserve is located in Qinghai and contains the headwaters of the Yellow River, Yangtze River, and Mekong River. The reserve was established to protect the headwaters of these three rivers and consists of 18 subareas, each containing three zones which are managed with differing degrees of strictness.

Qinghai Lake is the largest salt water lake in China, and the second largest in the world. Other large lakes are Lake Hala in the Qilian mountains, lakes Gyaring and Ngoring in the headwater region of the Yellow River, Lake Donggi Cona, and many saline and salt lakes in the western part of the province.

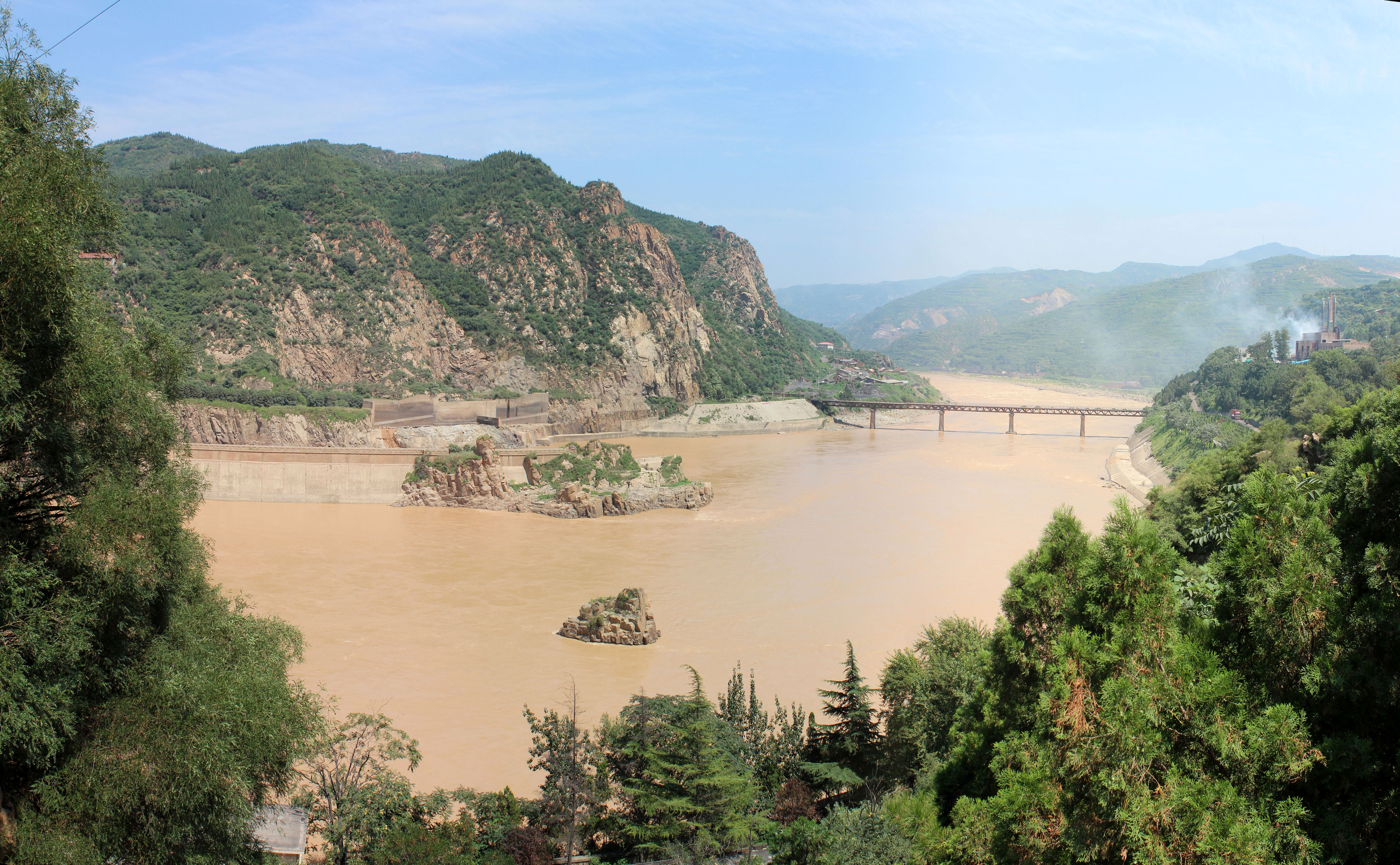
Yellow River

The Qaidam basin lies in the northwest part of the province at an altitude between 3000 and 5000 meters above sea level. About a third of this resource rich basin is desert.

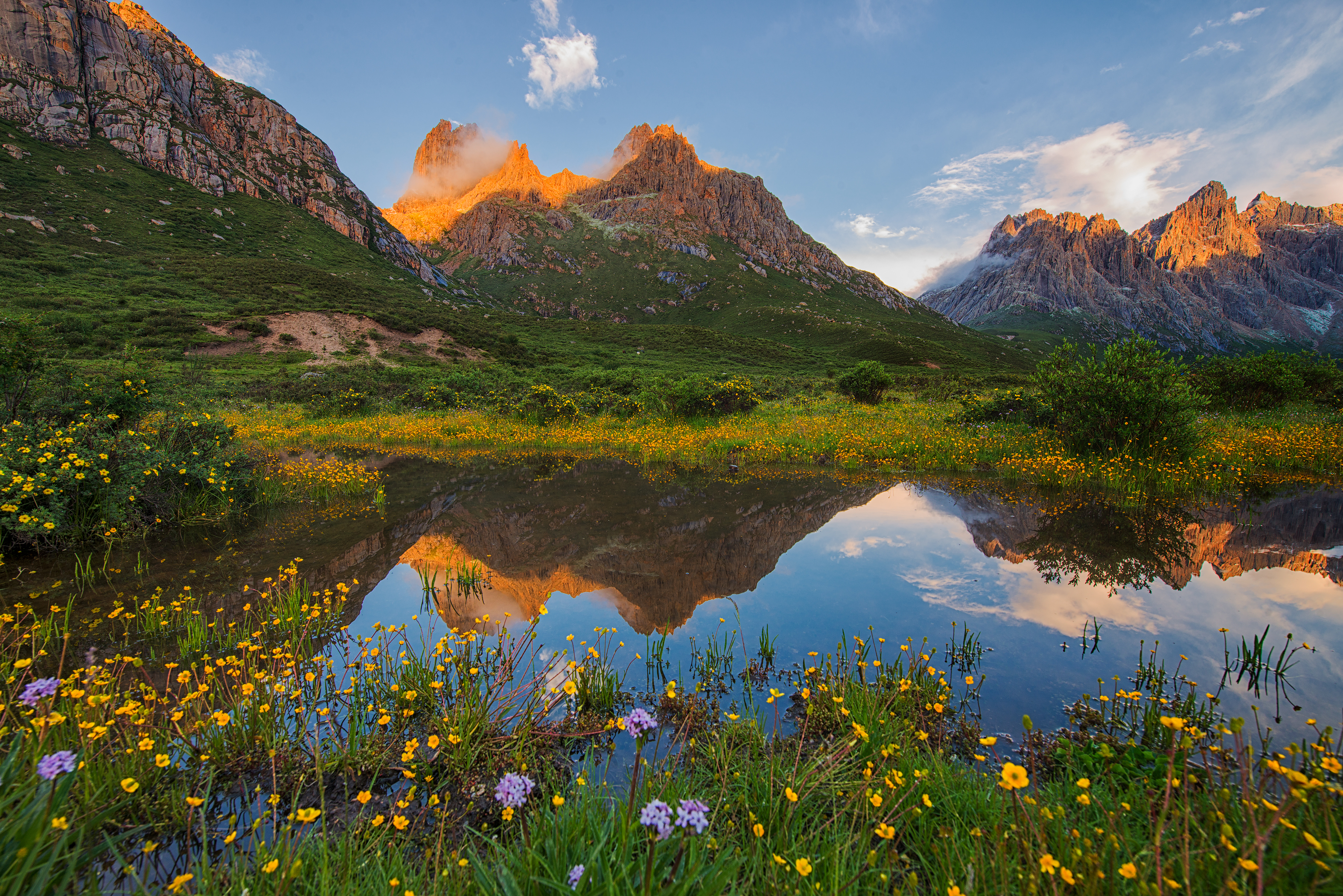
Nyenpo Yurtse, Jigzhi County, Qinghai

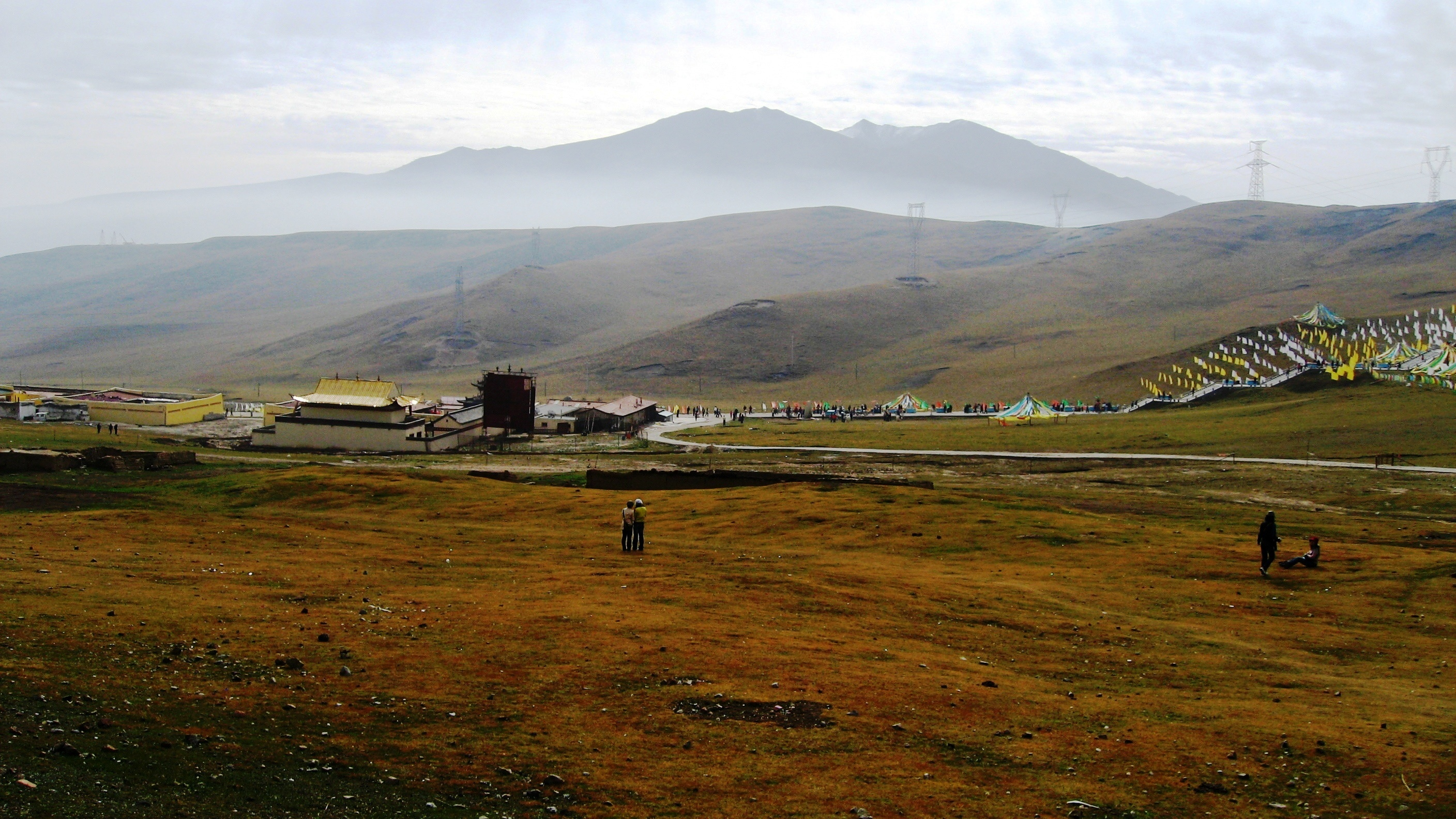
Riyue Mountain in Qinghai

=== Climate ===

The average elevation of Qinghai is approximately 3000 m. Mountain ranges include the Tanggula Mountains and Kunlun Mountains, with the highest point being Bukadaban Feng at 6860 m. Due to the high altitude, Qinghai has quite cold winters (harsh in the highest elevations), mild summers, and a large diurnal temperature variation. Its mean annual temperature is approximately −5 to 8 °C (23 to 46 °F), with January temperatures ranging from −18 to −7 °C (0 to 19 °F) and July temperatures ranging from 15 to 21 °C (59 to 70 °F). It is also prone to heavy winds as well as sandstorms from February to April. Significant rainfall occurs mainly in summer, while precipitation is very low in winter and spring, and is generally low enough to keep much of the province semi-arid or arid.

== Politics ==
The politics of Qinghai Province in the People's Republic of China are structured in a one party-government system like all other governing institutions in mainland China.

The Governor of Qinghai is the highest-ranking official in the People's Government of Qinghai. However, in the province's dual party-government governing system, the Governor has less power than the Qinghai Chinese Communist Party Committee Secretary.

== Administrative divisions ==
Because the Han form Qinghai's ethnic majority and because none of its many ethnic minorities have clear dominance over the rest, the province is not administered as an autonomous region. Instead, the province has many ethnic autonomous areas at the district and county levels. Qinghai is administratively divided into eight prefecture-level divisions: two prefecture-level cities and six autonomous prefectures:

Administrative divisions of Qinghai
Division code	Division	Area in km^{2}	Population 2010	Seat	Divisions			
Division code	Division	Area in km^{2}	Population 2010	Seat	Districts	Counties	Aut. counties	CL cities
630000	Qinghai Province	720,000.00	5,626,723	Xining city	7	25	7	5
630100	Xining city	7,424.11	2,208,708	Chengzhong District	5	1	1	
630200	Haidong city	13,043.99	1,396,845	Ledu District	2		4	
632200	Haibei Tibetan Autonomous Prefecture	33,349.99	273,304	Haiyan County		3	1	
632300	Huangnan Tibetan Autonomous Prefecture	17,908.89	256,716	Tongren city		2	1	1
632500	Hainan Tibetan Autonomous Prefecture	43,377.11	441,691	Gonghe County		5		
632600	Golog Tibetan Autonomous Prefecture	76,442.38	181,682	Maqên County		6		
632700	Yushu Tibetan Autonomous Prefecture	197,953.70	378,439	Yushu city		5		1
632800	Haixi Mongol and Tibetan Autonomous Prefecture	300,854.48	489,338	Delingha city		3		3

Administrative divisions in Chinese and varieties of romanizations
English	Chinese	Pinyin
Qinghai Province	青海省	Qīnghǎi Shěng
Xining city	西宁市	Xīníng Shì
Haidong city	海东市	Hǎidōng Shì
Haibei Tibetan Autonomous Prefecture	海北藏族自治州	Hǎiběi Zàngzú Zìzhìzhōu
Huangnan Tibetan Autonomous Prefecture	黄南藏族自治州	Huángnán Zàngzú Zìzhìzhōu
Hainan Tibetan Autonomous Prefecture	海南藏族自治州	Hǎinán Zàngzú Zìzhìzhōu
Golog Tibetan Autonomous Prefecture	果洛藏族自治州	Guǒluò Zàngzú Zìzhìzhōu
Yushu Tibetan Autonomous Prefecture	玉树藏族自治州	Yùshù Zàngzú Zìzhìzhōu
Haixi Mongol and Tibetan Autonomous Prefecture	海西蒙古族藏族自治州	Hǎixī Měnggǔzú Zàngzú Zìzhìzhōu

The eight prefecture-level divisions of Qinghai are subdivided into 44 county-level divisions (6 districts, 4 county-level cities, 27 counties and 7 autonomous counties).

Population by urban areas of prefecture & county cities
#	Cities	2020 Urban area	2010 Urban area	2020 City proper
1	Xining	1,677,177	1,153,417	2,467,965
2	Haidong	204,784	(Note: Haidong Prefecture is currently known as Haidong PLC after 2010 census; Ledu County & Ping'an County is currently known as Ledu & Ping'an (core districts of Haidong) after 2010 census.)	1,358,471
3	Golmud	197,153	156,779	part of Haixi Prefecture
4	Yushu	85,497	(Note: Yushu County is currently known as Yushu CLC after 2010 census.)	part of Yushu Prefecture
5	Delingha	65,424	54,844	part of Haixi Prefecture
(6)	Tongren	49,962 (Note: Tongren County is currently known as Tongren CLC after 2020 census.)		part of Huangnan Prefecture
7	Mangnai	18,856	(Note: Mangnai Administrative Zone & Lenghu Administrative Zone County is currently known as Mangnai CLC after 2010 census.)	part of Haixi Prefecture

== Demographics ==
Historical population
Year	Pop.	±%
1912	368,000	—
1928	619,000	+68.2%
1936–37	1,196,000	+93.2%
1947	1,308,000	+9.4%
1954	1,676,534	+28.2%
1964	2,145,604	+28.0%
1982	3,895,706	+81.6%
1990	4,456,946	+14.4%
2000	4,822,963	+8.2%
2010	5,626,722	+16.7%
2020	5,923,957	+5.3%

=== Ethnicity ===
There are over 37 recognized ethnic groups among Qinghai's population of 5.6 million, with Han population standing at 50.5% of the total population and ethnic minorities making up 49.5% of the population. In 2010, Tibetan population stood at 20.7%, Hui 16%, Tu (Monguor) 4%, with also some groups of Mongol, and Salar, all of those groups being the most populous in the province. Han Chinese predominate in the cities of Xining, Haidong, Delingha and Golmud, and elsewhere in the northeast. The Hui are concentrated in Xining, Haidong, Minhe County, Hualong County, and Datong County. The Tu people predominate in Huzhu County and the Salars in Xunhua County; Tibetans and Mongols are sparsely distributed across the rural western part of the province. Of the Muslim ethnic groups in China, Qinghai has communities of Hui, Salar, Dongxiang, and Bao'an. The Hui dominate the wholesale business in Qinghai.

=== Religion ===
Religion in Qinghai (2000s)
1. Buddhism, Chinese folk religions (including Taoism), Bön and non-religious population (81.7%)
2. Islam (17.5%)
3. Christianity (0.76%)

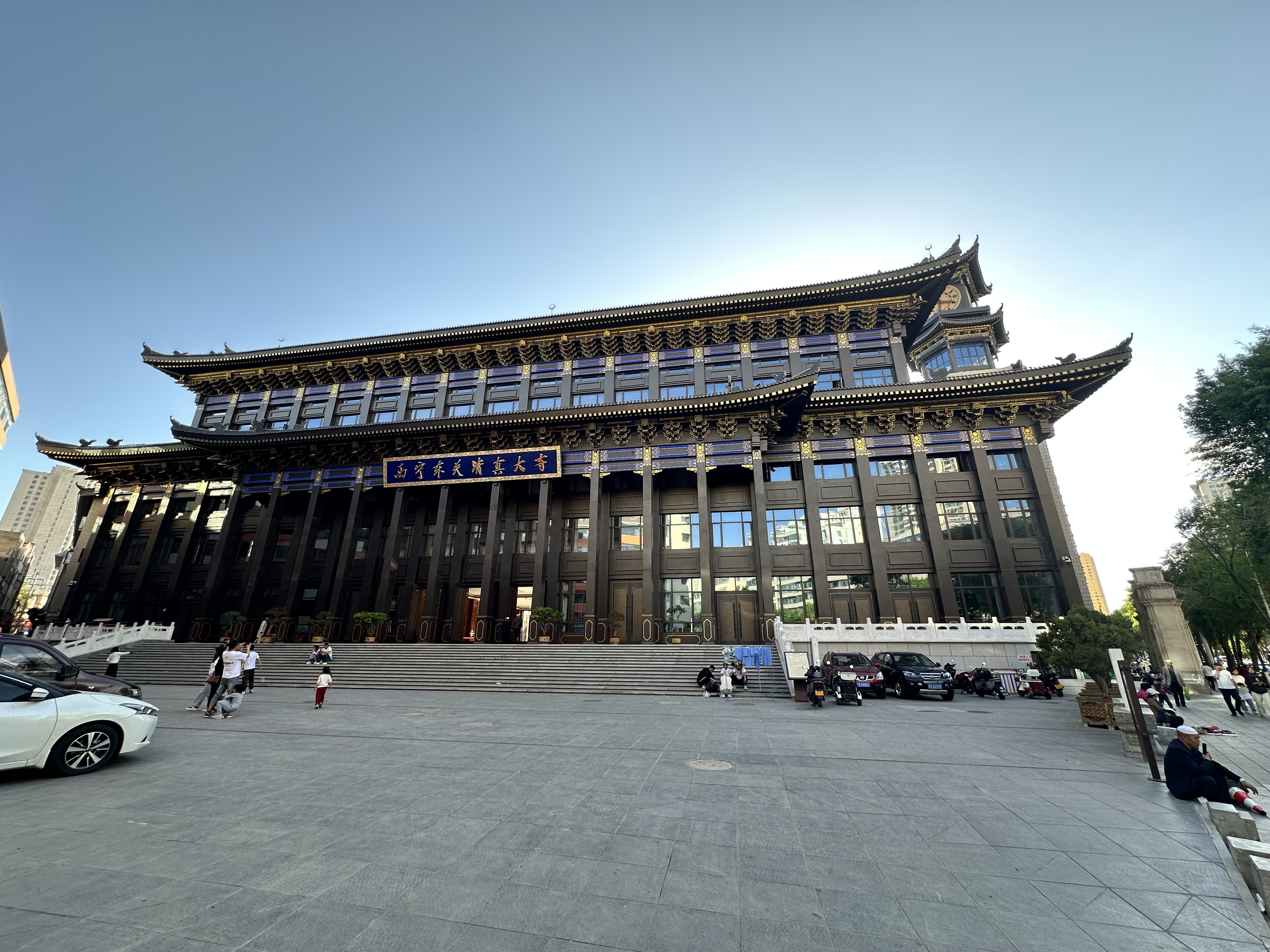
The Dongguan Mosque in Qinghai

The predominant religions in Qinghai are Chinese folk religions (including Taoist traditions and Confucianism) and Chinese Buddhism among the Han Chinese. The large Tibetan population practices Tibetan schools of Buddhism or traditional Tibetan Bön religion, while the Hui Chinese practice Islam. Christianity is the religion of 0.76% of the province's population according to the Chinese General Social Survey of 2004. According to a survey of 2010, 17.51% of the population of Qinghai follow Islam.

From September 1848, the city was the seat of a short-lived Latin Catholic Apostolic Vicariate (pre-diocesan missionary jurisdiction) of Kokonur (alias Khouhkou-noor, Kokonoor), but it was suppressed in 1861. No incumbent(s) recorded.

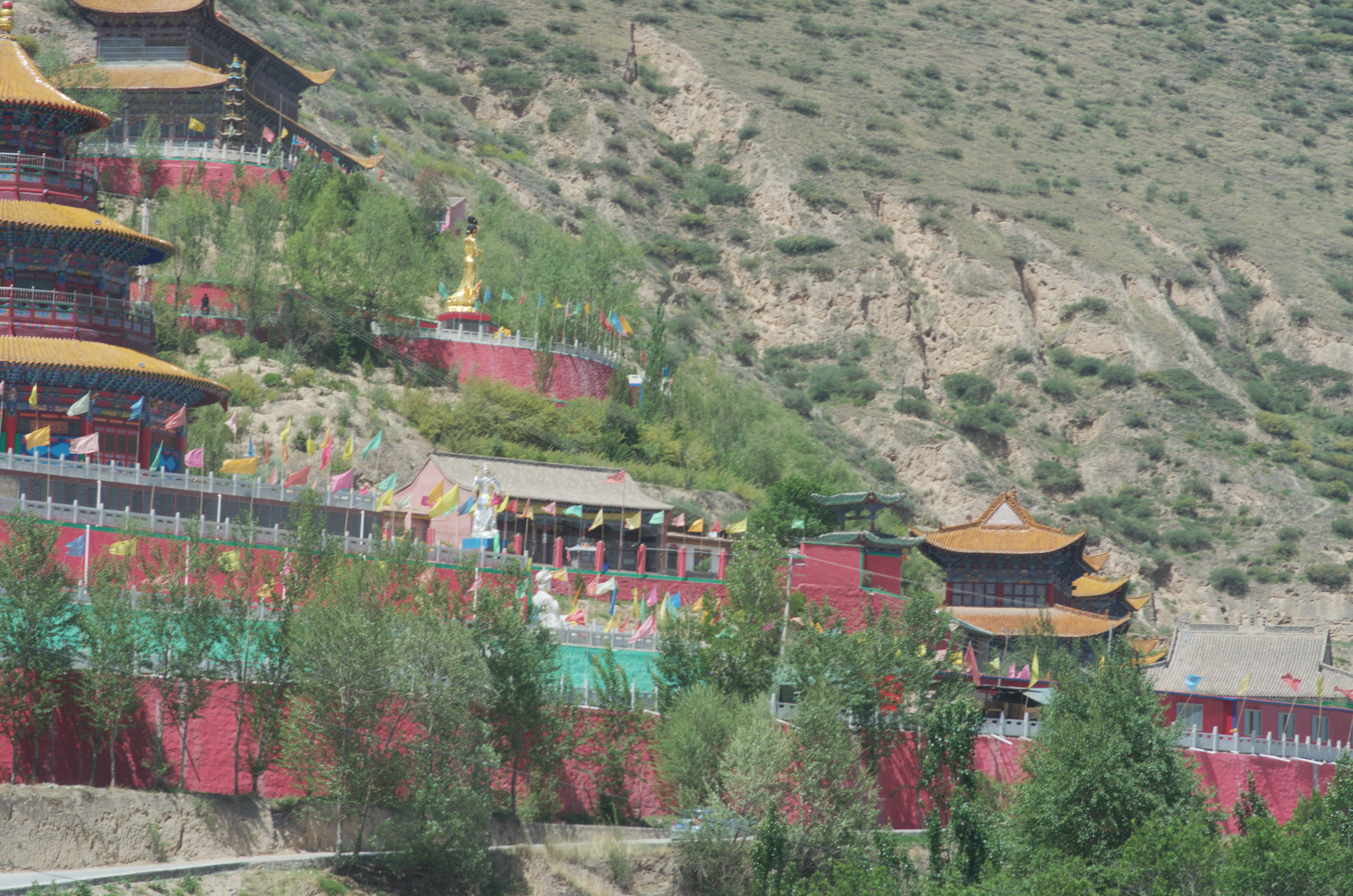
A Taoist temple dedicated to Jiutian Xuannü on Mount Fenghuang, in Lunmalong village, Duoba, Xining

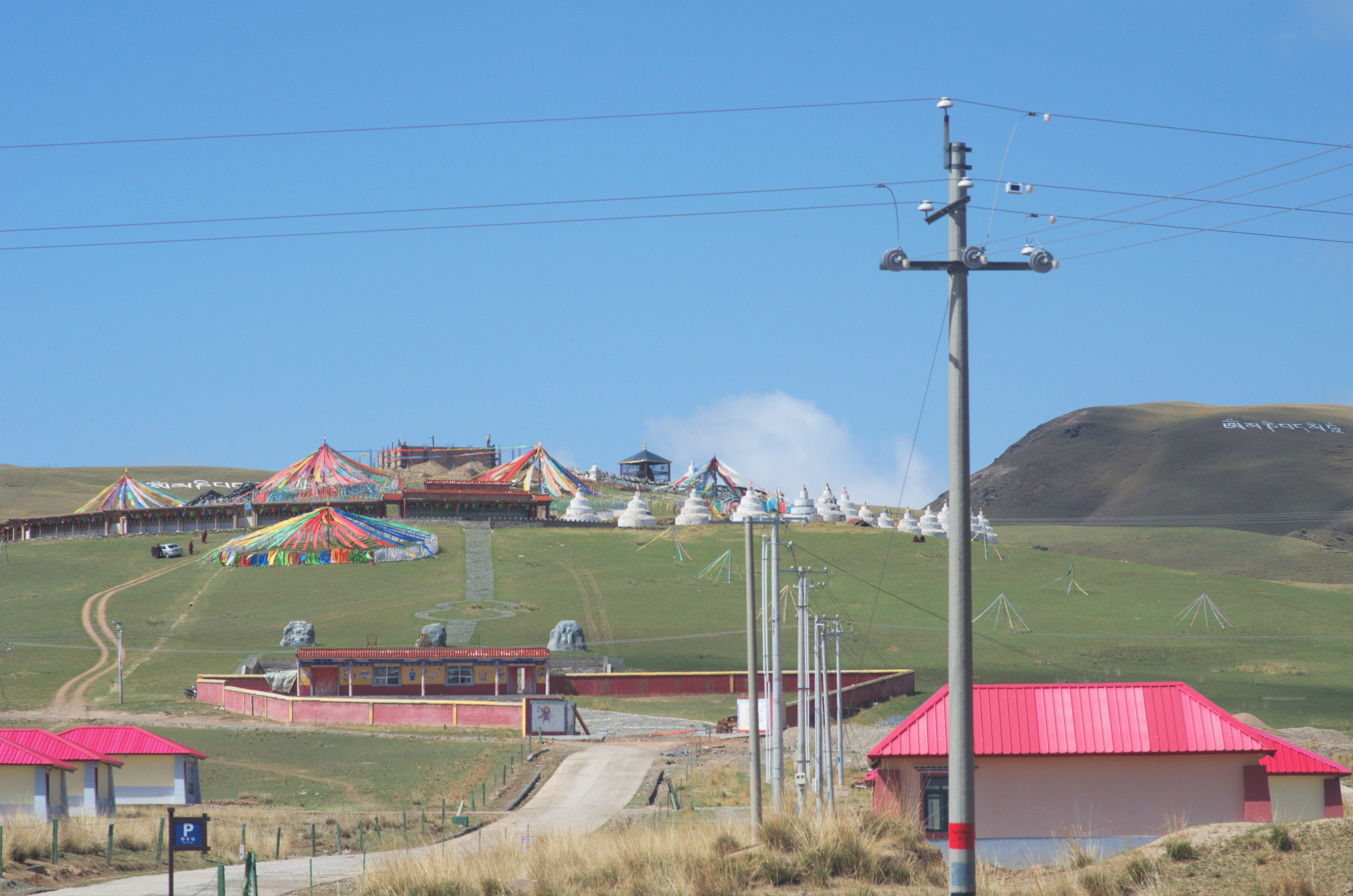
A Buddhist temple on Riyue Mountain, in Huangyuan County, Xining

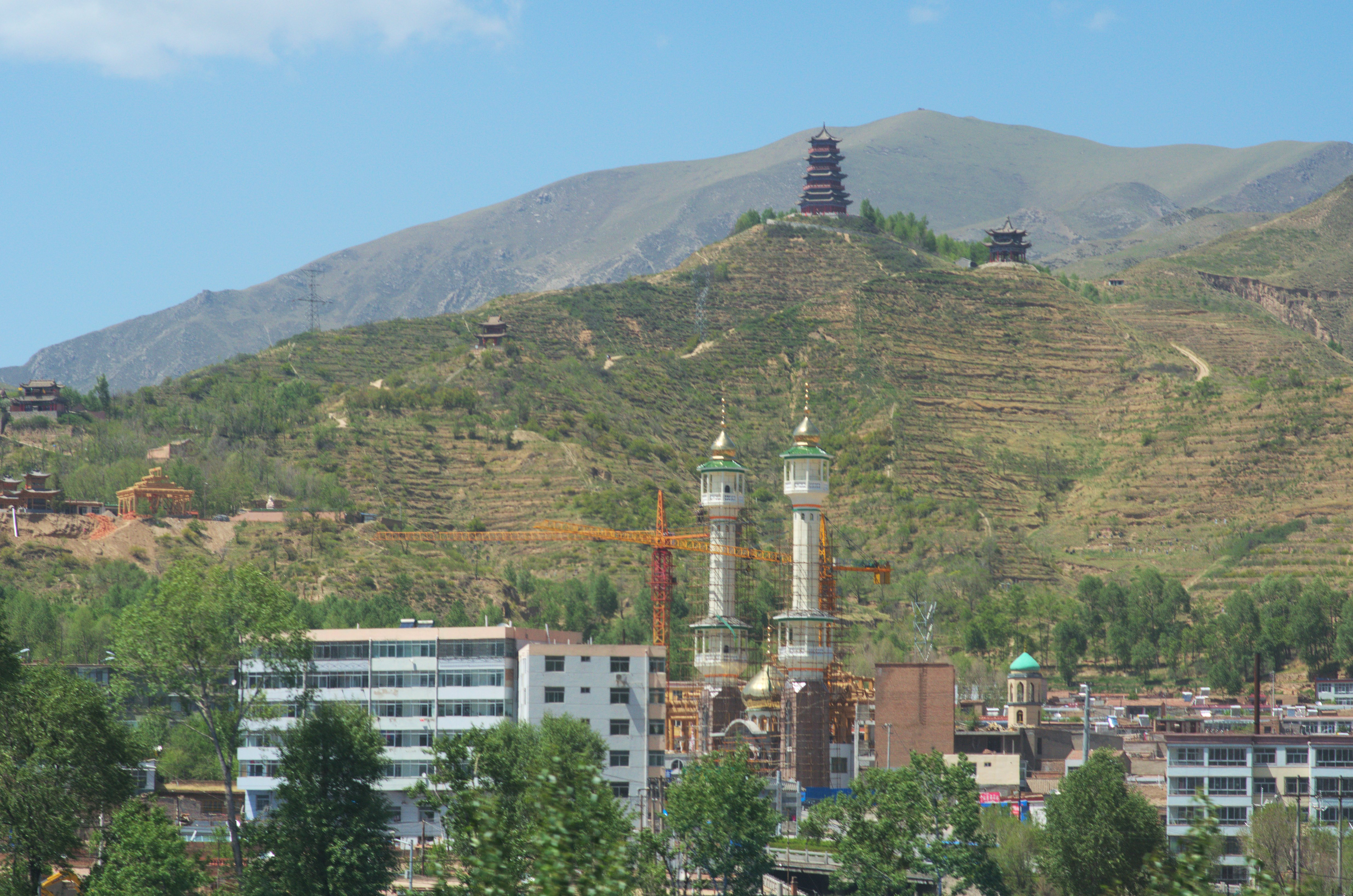
Mosques and Chinese folk temples characterising the skyline of Huangyuan County

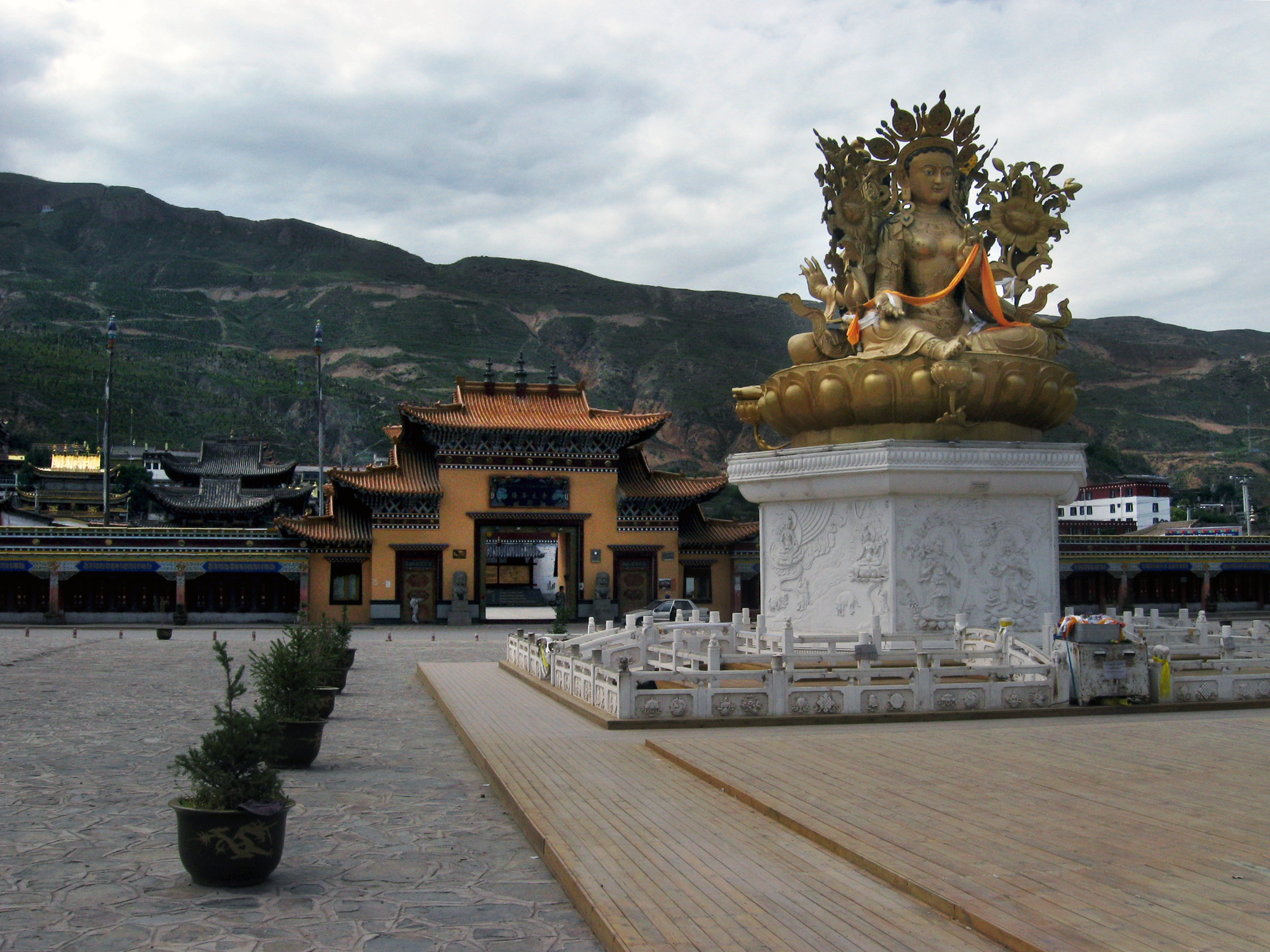
Rongwo Tibetan Buddhist Monastery in Tongren County

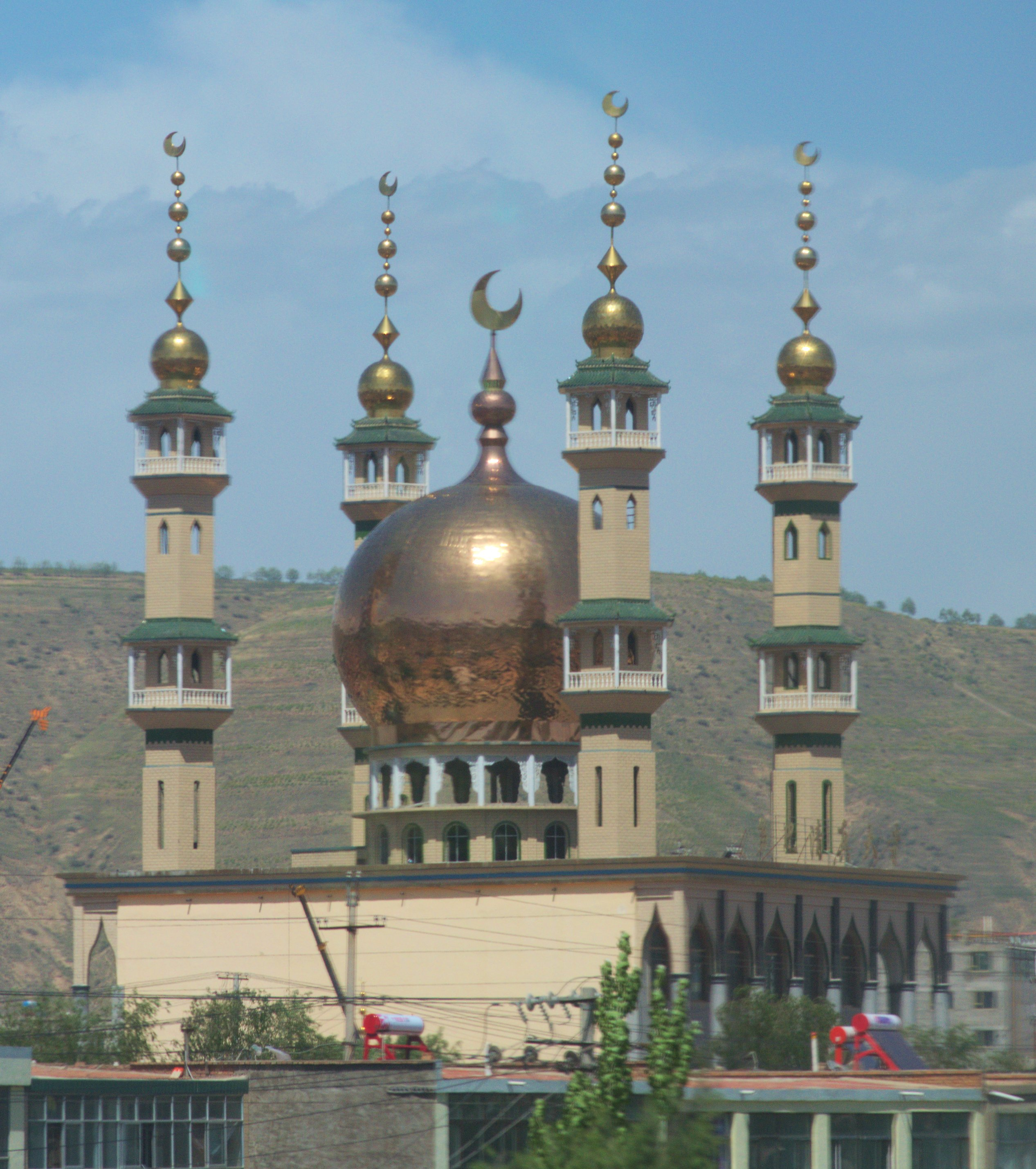
Great Mosque of Duoba, Xining

== Culture ==
Qinghai has been influenced by interactions "between Mongol and Tibetan culture, north to south, and Han Chinese and Inner Asia Muslim culture, east to west". The languages of Qinghai have for centuries formed a local Sprachbund, with Zhongyuan Mandarin, Amdo Tibetan, Salar, Yugur, and Monguor borrowing from and influencing one another. In mainstream Chinese culture, Qinghai is most associated with the Tale of King Mu, Son of Heaven. According to this legend, King Mu of Zhou (r. 976–922 BCE) pursued hostile Quanrong nomads to eastern Qinghai, where the goddess Xi Wangmu threw the king a banquet in the Kunlun Mountains.

The main religions in Qinghai are Tibetan Buddhism, Islam and Chinese Folk Religions. The Dongguan Mosque has been continuously operating since 1380. Measures of education in Qinghai are low, particularly among the ethnic minorities. The yak, which is native to Qinghai, is widely used in the province for transportation and its meat.

== Economy ==
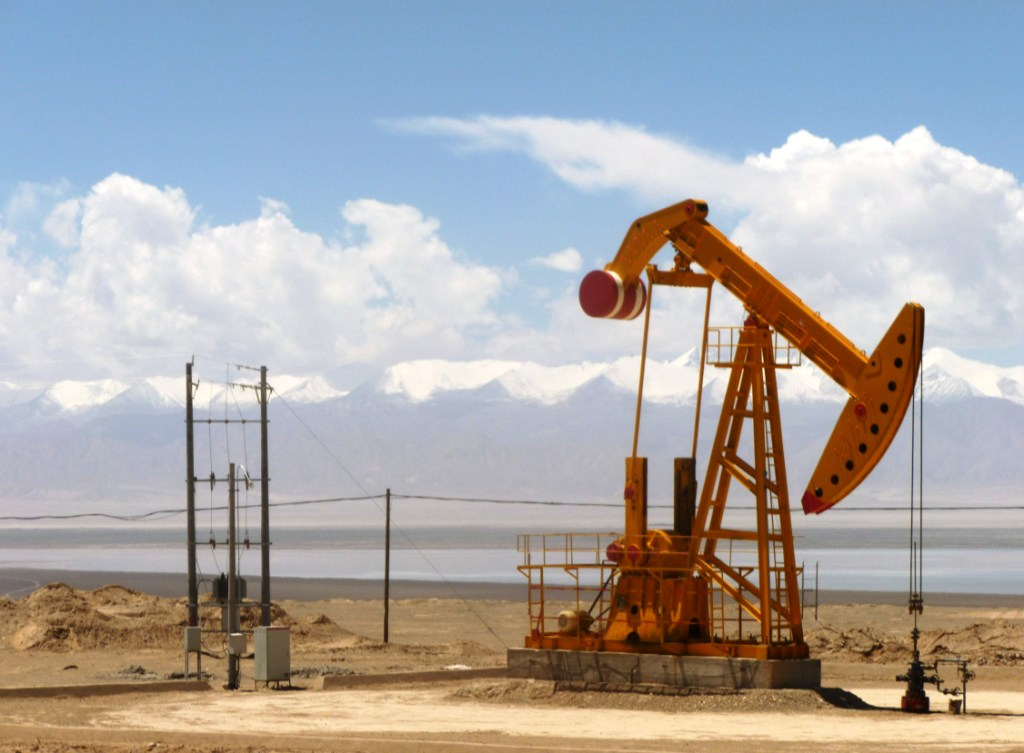
Oil well in Tsaidam (Qaidam), Qinghai

Qinghai's economy is amongst the smallest in China. Its nominal GDP in 2025 was just RMB 412 billion (US$58 billion) and contributes to about 0.29% of the entire country's economy. Per capita GDP was RMB 69,567 (US$9,739) (nominal), the 24th in China.

Its heavy industry includes iron and steel production, located near its capital city of Xining. Oil and natural gas from the Qaidam Basin have also been an important contributor to the economy. Salt works operate at many of the province's numerous salt lakes.

Outside of the provincial capital, Xining, most of Qinghai remains underdeveloped. Qinghai ranks second lowest in China in terms of highway length, and will require a significant expansion of its infrastructure to capitalize on the economic potential of its rich natural resources.

=== Economic and technological development zone ===
Xining Economic & Technological Development Zone (XETDZ) was approved as state-level development zone in July 2000. It has a planned area of 4.4 km^{2}. XETDZ lies in the east of Xining, 5 km from the city centre. Xining is located in the east of the province at the upper reaches of the Huangshui River, one of the Yellow River's branches. The city is surrounded by mountains with an average elevation of 2261 m, the highest at 4393 m. XETDZ is the first of its kind at the national level on the Qinghai-Tibet Plateau. It is established to fulfill the nation's strategy of developing the west.

XETDZ is connected to the Xining–Lanzhou Expressway and traversed by two major city thoroughfares. It is located 4 km from the main railway station and 15 km from Xining Airport, which offers flights to major domestic destinations including Beijing, Guangzhou, Shanghai, Chengdu, and Xi'an. As a regional transportation hub, Xining is served by multiple highways and two primary rail lines, the Lanzhou–Qinghai and Qinghai–Tibet railways.

It focuses on the development of following industries: chemicals based on salt lake resources, nonferrous metals, and petroleum and natural gas processing; special medicine, foods and bio-chemicals using local plateau animals and plants; new products involving ecological and environmental protection, high technology, new materials as well as information technology; and services such as logistics, banking, real estate, tourism, hotel, catering, agency and international trade.

=== Tourism ===
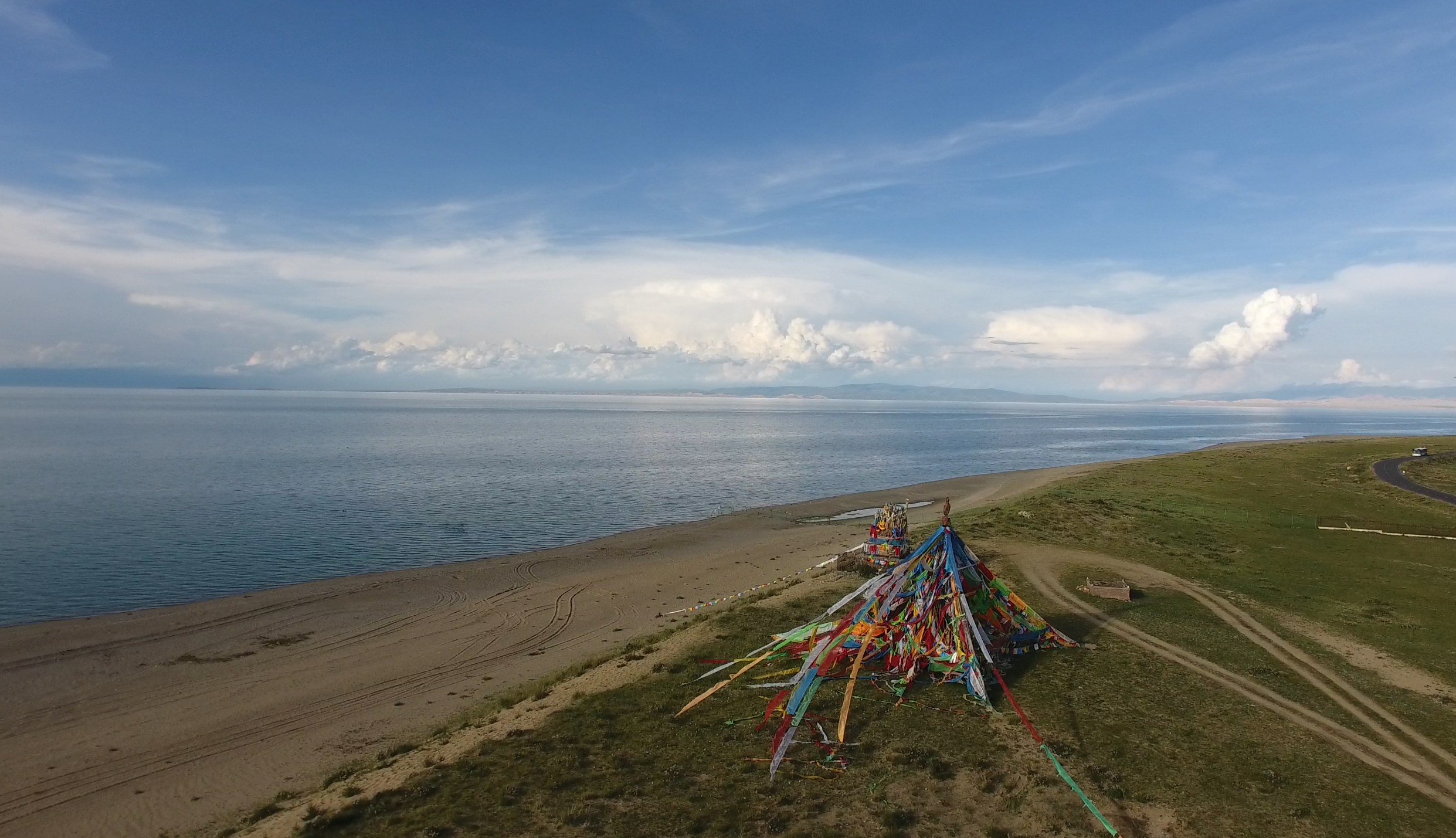
View of the Qinghai Lake

There are many tourist attractions center on Xining, the provincial seat of Qinghai.

During the hot summer months, many tourists from the hot southern and eastern parts of China travel to Xining, as the climate of Xining in July and August is quite mild and comfortable, making the city an ideal summer retreat.

Qinghai Lake (青海湖; qīnghǎi hú) is another tourist attraction, albeit further from Xining than Kumbum Monastery (Ta'er Si). The lake is the largest saltwater lake in China, and is also located on the "Roof of the World", the Tibetan Plateau. The lake itself lies at 3,600 m elevation. The surrounding area is made up of rolling grasslands and populated by ethnic Tibetans. Most pre-arranged tours stop at Bird Island (鸟岛; niǎo dǎo). An international bicycle race takes place annually from Xining to Qinghai Lake.

=== Transportation ===
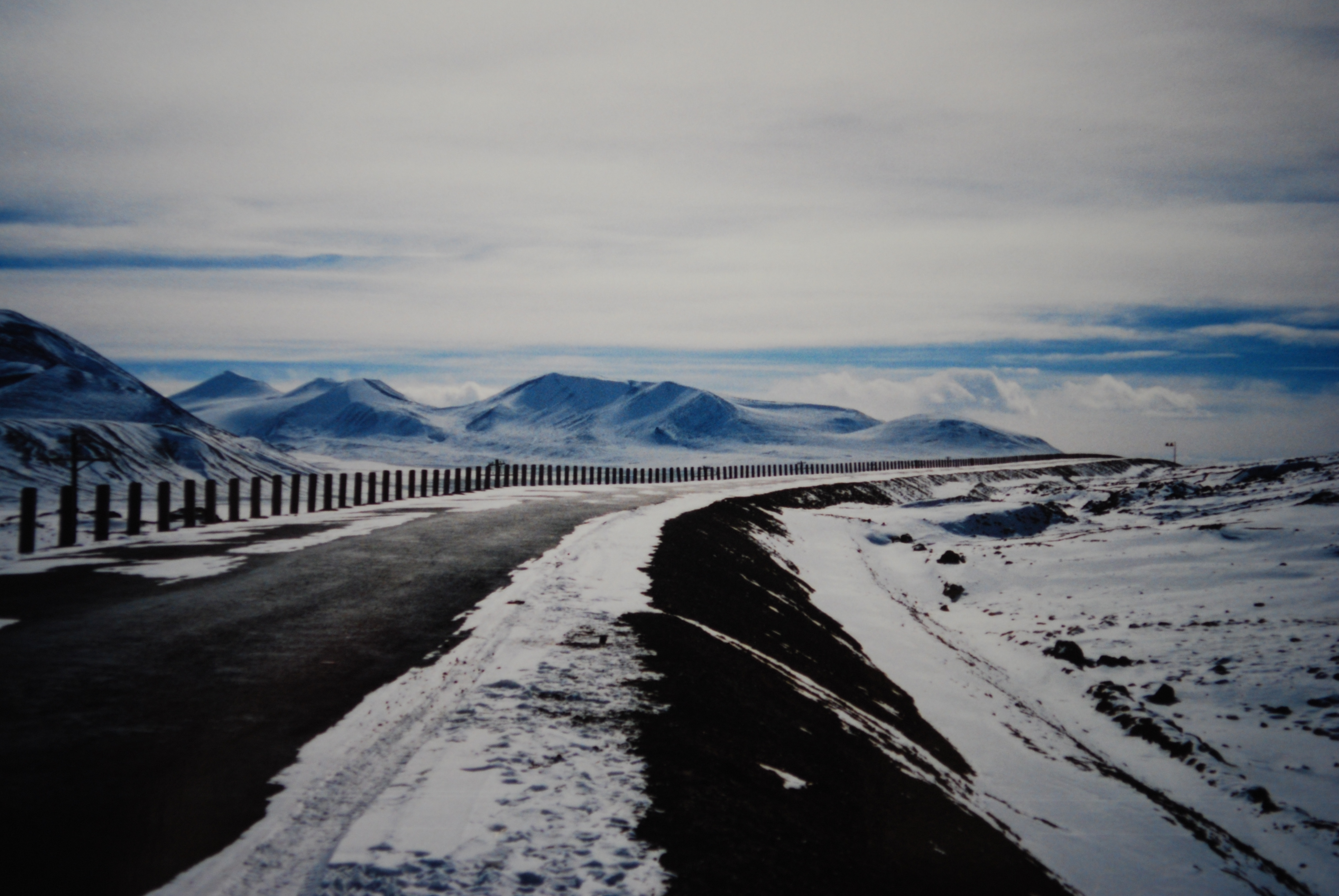
China National Highway 109 in Qinghai

The Lanqing Railway, running between Lanzhou, Gansu and Xining, the province's capital, was completed in 1959 and is the major transportation route in and out of the province. A continuation of the line, the Qinghai-Tibet Railway via Golmud and western Qinghai, has become one of the most ambitious projects in PRC history. It was completed in October 2005 and now links Tibet with the rest of China through Qinghai.

Construction on the Golmud–Dunhuang Railway, in the province's northwestern part, started in 2012.

Six National Highways run through the province.

Xining Caojiabao International Airport provides service to Beijing, Lanzhou, Golmud and Delingha. Smaller regional airports, Delingha Airport, Golog Maqin Airport, Huatugou Airport, Qilian Airport and Yushu Batang Airport, serve the province's smaller communities; plans exist for the construction of three more by 2020.

== Telecommunications ==
Since the Ministry of Industry and Information Technology began its "Access to Telephones Project", Qinghai has invested 640 million yuan to provide telephone access to 3,860 out of its 4,133 administrative villages. At the end of 2006, 299 towns had received Internet access. However, 6.6 percent of villages in the region still have no access to the telephone. These villages are mainly scattered in Qingnan Area, with 90 percent of them located in Yushu and Guoluo. The average altitude of these areas exceeds 3600 meters, and the poor natural conditions hamper the establishment of telecommunications facilities in the region.

Satellite phones have been provided to 186 remote villages in Qinghai Province as of September 14, 2007. The areas benefited were Yushu Tibetan Autonomous Prefecture and Guoluo Tibetan Autonomous Prefecture. Qinghai has recently been provided with satellite telephone access. In June 2007, China Satcom carried out an in-depth survey in Yushu and Guoluo, and made a special satellite phones for these areas. Two phones were provided to each village for free, and calls were charged at the rate of 0.2 RMB (about a quarter of a US cent at that time) per minute for both local and national calls, with the extra charges assumed by China Satcom. No monthly rent was charged on the satellite phone. International calls were also available.

== Colleges and universities ==
- Qinghai University (青海大学)
- Qinghai Normal University (青海师范大学)
- Qinghai University for Nationalities (青海民族大学)
- Qinghai Medical College (青海医学院)
- Qinghai Radio & Television University (青海广播电视大学)

== See also ==
- 2010 Yushu earthquake
- Amdo
- Geladandong
- Haplogroup D-M15 (Y-DNA)
- Haplogroup O3 (Y-DNA)
- Iris qinghainica (native plant of Qinghai)
- Major national historical and cultural sites in Qinghai
- Tectonic summary of Qinghai
