= List of township-level divisions of Qinghai =

A list of township-level divisions of Qinghai, China (PRC): After province, prefecture, and county-level divisions, township-level divisions constitute the formal fourth-level administrative divisions of the PRC. The townships of Qinghai are divided into subdistricts, towns, townships, and ethnic townships.

== Xining ==
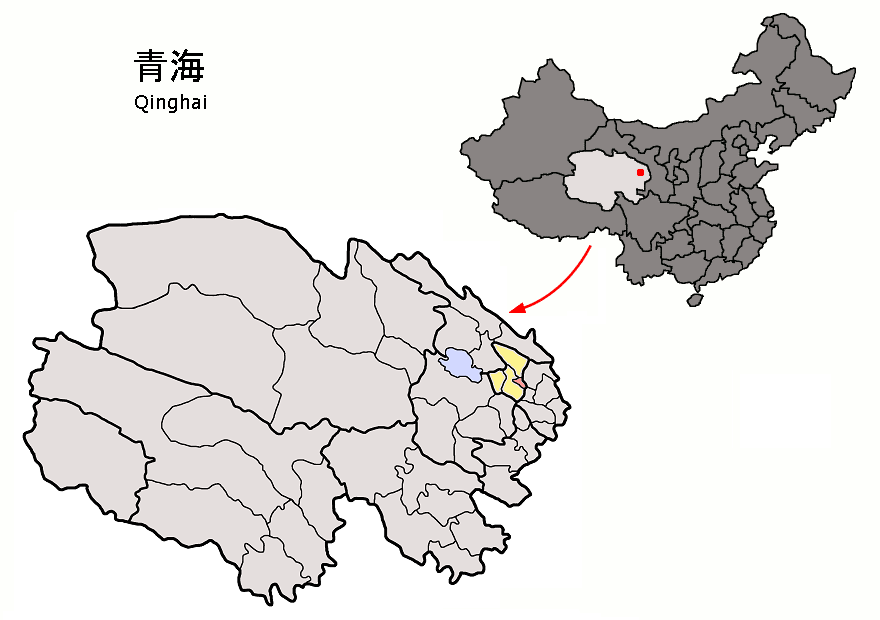
Location of Xining Districts in the Qinghai

=== Chengzhong District ===
Subdistricts:

- Renmin Street Subdistrict (人民街街道), Nantan Subdistrict (南滩街道), Cangmen Street Subdistrict (仓门街街道), Lirang Street Subdistrict (礼让街街道), Yinma Street Subdistrict (饮马街街道), Nanchuan East Road Subdistrict (南川东路街道), Nanchuan West Road Subdistrict (南川西路街道)

Town:

- Zhongzhai (总寨镇).

=== Chengdong District ===
Subdistricts:

- Dongguan Street Subdistrict (东关大街街道), Qingzhen Alley Subdistrict (清真巷街道), Dazhong Street Subdistrict (大众街街道), Zhoujiaquan Subdistrict (周家泉街道), Huochezhan Subdistrict (火车站街道), Bayi Road Subdistrict (八一路街道), Linjiaya Subdistrict (林家崖街道)

Towns:

- Lejiawan (乐家湾镇), Yunjiakou (韵家口镇)

=== Chengxi District ===
Subdistricts:

- Xiguan Avenue Subdistrict (西关大街街道), Guchengtai Subdistrict (古城台街道), Hutai Subdistrict (虎台街道), Shengli Road Subdistrict (胜利路街道), Nanchuan West Road Subdistrict (南川西路街道)

Town:

- Pengjiazhai (彭家寨镇)

=== Chengbei District ===
Subdistricts:

- Chaoyang Subdistrict (朝阳街道), Xiaoqiao Street Subdistrict (小桥大街街道), Mafang Subdistrict (马坊街道)

Towns:

- Baoziwan (大堡子镇), Nianlipu (廿里铺镇).

=== Huangyuan County ===
Towns:

- Chengguan (城关镇), Dahua (大华镇)

Townships:

- Dongxia Township (东峡乡), Heping Township (和平乡), Bohang Township (波航乡), Shenzhong Township (ཞིང་སྐྱོང་, 申中乡), Bayan Township (巴燕乡), Sizhai Township (寺寨乡)

Ethnic Township:

- Riyue Tibetan Ethnic Township (ཉི་ཟླ་ཞང་།, 日月藏族乡)

=== Huangzhong County ===
Subdistricts: Kangchuan Subdistrict (康川街道) and Ganhe Industrial Park (甘河工业园)

Towns:

- Lusha'er (རུ་གསར་, 鲁沙尔镇), Duoba (མདོ་བ་, 多巴镇), Xibao (西堡镇), Shangxinzhuang (上新庄镇), Tianjiazhai (田家寨镇), Ganhetan (甘河滩镇), Gonghe (共和镇), Lanlongkou (ལམ་ལུང་, 拦隆口镇), Shangwuzhuang (上五庄镇), Lijiashan (李家山镇),

Townships:

- Tumenguan Township (土门关乡), Haizigou Township (海子沟乡)

Ethnic Townships:

- Qunjia Tibetan Ethnic Township (群加藏族乡), Handong Hui Ethnic Township (汉东回族乡), Dacai Hui Ethnic Township (大才回族乡)

=== Datong County ===
Towns:

- Qiaotou (桥头镇), Chengguan (城关镇), Ta'er (塔尔镇), Dongxia (东峡镇), Huanhjiazhai (黄家寨镇), Changning (长宁镇), Jingyang (景阳镇), Duolin (多林镇), Xinzhuang (新庄镇)

Townships:

- Qinglin Township (青林乡), Qingshan Township (青山乡), Xunrang Township (逊让乡), Jile Township (极乐乡), Shishan Township (石山乡), Baoku Township (宝库乡), Xiegou Township (斜沟乡), Liangjiao Township (良教乡), Hualin Township (桦林乡)

Ethnic Townships:

- Xianghua Tibetan Ethnic Township (向化藏族乡), Shuobei Tibetan Ethnic Township (朔北藏族乡)

== Haidong ==
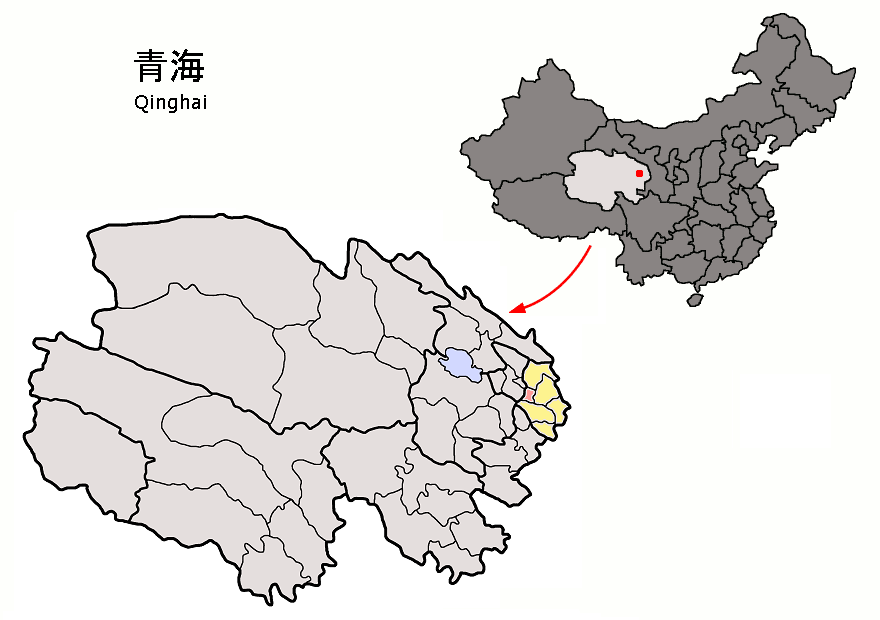
Location of Ping'an District in Qinghai (city in pink, rest of administrative area in yellow)

=== Ping'an District ===
Towns:

- Ping'an (平安镇), Xiaoxia (小峡镇), Sanhe (三合镇)

Township:

- Sitai Township (寺台乡)

Ethnic Townships: Hongshuiquan Hui Ethnic Township (洪水泉回族乡), Shihuiyao Hui Ethnic Township (石灰窑回族乡), Gucheng Hui Ethnic Township (古城回族乡), Shagou Hui Ethnic Township (沙沟回族乡), Bazanggou Hui Ethnic Township (巴藏沟回族乡)

=== Ledu District ===
Towns:

- Nianbo (碾伯镇), Yurun (雨润镇), Shoule (寿乐镇), Gaomiao (高庙镇), Hongshui (洪水镇), Gaodian (高店镇), Qutan (瞿昙镇)

Townships:

- Gonghe Township (共和乡), Zhongling Township (中岭乡), Lijia Township (李家乡), Luhua Township (芦化乡), Maying Townshipi (马营乡), Machang Township (马厂乡), Putai Township (蒲台乡), Fengdui Township (峰堆乡), Chengtai Township (城台乡),

Ethnic Townships:

- Xiaying Tibetan Ethnic Township (下营藏族乡), Zhongba Tibetan Ethnic Township (中坝藏族乡), Dala Tibetan Ethnic Township (达拉土族乡)

=== Minhe County ===
Towns:

- Chuankou (川口镇), Gushan (古鄯镇), Maying (马营镇), Guanting (官亭镇), Bazhou (巴州镇), Manping (满坪镇), Li'erbao (李二堡镇), Xiamen (峡门镇)

Townships:

- Machangyuan Township (马场垣乡), Beishan Township (北山乡), Songshu Township (松树乡), Xigou Township (西沟乡), Zongbao Township (总堡乡), Longzhi Township (隆治乡), Dazhuang Township (大庄乡), Zhuandao Township (转导乡), Qianhe Township (前河乡), Gangou Township (甘沟乡), Zhongchuan Township (中川乡), Hetaozhuang Township (核桃庄乡), Xinmin Township (新民乡)

Ethnic Township:

- Xing'er Tibetan Ethnic Township (杏儿藏族乡)

=== Huzhu County ===
Towns:

- Weiyuan (威远镇), Danma (འདན་མ་, 丹麻镇), Gaozhai (高寨镇), Nanmenxia (南门峡镇), Jiading (རྒྱ་ཏེག་, 加定镇), Tangchuan (塘川镇), Wushi (五十镇), Wufeng (五峰镇)

Townships:

- Taizi Township (台子乡), Xishan Township (西山乡), Hongyazigou Township (红崖子沟乡), Halazhigou Township (哈拉直沟乡), Dongshan Township (东山乡), Donghe Township (东和乡), Donggou Township (东沟乡), Linchuan Township (林川乡), Caijiabao Township (蔡家堡乡)

Ethnic Townships:

- Bazha Tibetan Ethnic Township (བ་བཟའ་, 巴扎藏族乡), Songduo Tibetan Ethnic Township (སུམ་མདོ་, 松多藏族乡)

=== Hualong County ===
Towns:

- Bayan (巴燕镇), Qunke (ཚའཱི་མགུར་, 群科镇), Yashiga (ཡར་ག་, 牙什尕镇), Gandu (ཀ་མདོ་, 甘都镇), Zhaba (རྩ་བ་, 扎巴镇), Angsiduo (ནང་སྟོད་, 昂思多镇)

Townships:

- Chuma Township (ཆུ་དམར་, 初麻乡), Ertang Township (二塘乡), Xiejiatan Township (谢家滩乡), Dehenglong Township (སྟག་ལུང་, 德恒隆乡), Shalianbao Township (沙连堡乡), Ashennu Township (ཨ་སྔོན་, 阿什奴乡), Dashicang Township (སྟག་ཚང་, 石大仓乡)

Ethnic Townships:

- Shongshen Tibetan Ethnic Township (གཤོང་ཤན་, 雄先藏族乡), Tsaphug Tibetan Ethnic Township (ཚ་ཕུག་, 查甫藏族乡), Thagya Tibetan Ethnic Township (ཐ་རྒྱ་, 塔加藏族乡), Serzhong Tibetan Ethnic Township (གསེར་གཞོང་, 金源藏族乡)

=== Xunhua County ===
Towns:

- Jishi (积石镇), Baizhuang (白庄镇), Jiezi (街子镇)

Townships:

- Qingshui Township (清水乡), Chahan Duzi Township (查汗都斯乡),

Ethnic Townships:

- Dowei Tibetan Ethnic Township (རྡོ་སྦིས་, 道帏藏族乡), Kangtsa Tibetan Ethnic Township (རྐང་ཚ་, 岗察藏族乡), Bindo Tibetan Ethnic Township (བིས་མདོ་, 文都藏族乡), Karing Tibetan Ethnic Township (ཀ་རིང་, 尕楞藏族乡)

== Haibei ==
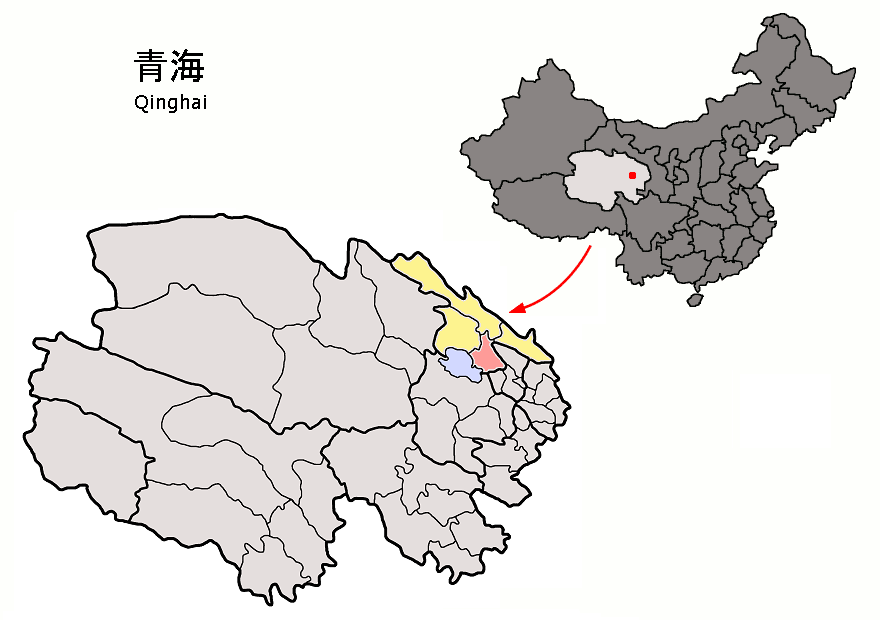
Location of Haiyan County in Qinghai (city in pink, rest of administrative area in yellow)

=== Haiyan County ===
Towns:

- Sanjiaocheng (三角城镇), Xihai (西海镇)

Townships:

- Jintan Township (གསེར་ཐང་, 金滩乡), Qinghaihu Township (青海湖乡), Ganzihe Township (甘子河乡)

Ethnic Township:

- Halejing Mongol Ethnic Township (哈勒景蒙古族乡)

=== Qilian County ===
Towns:

- Babao (八宝镇), Ebao (峨堡镇), Mole (མུ་རི་, 默勒镇)

Townships:

- Zamashi Townships (རྫ་མ་སྐེ, 扎麻什乡), Aruo Township (阿柔乡), Yeniugou Township (འབྲོང་ལུང་, 野牛沟乡), Yanglong Township (央隆乡)

=== Gangca County ===
Towns:

- Shaliuhe (沙柳河镇), Ha'ergai (ཧར་དགེ, 哈尔盖镇)

Townships:

- Yike Wulan Township (伊克乌兰乡), Quanji Township (ཁྱོན་རྒྱས་, 泉吉乡), Ji'ermeng Township (吉尔孟乡)

=== Menyuan County ===
Towns:

- Haomen (浩门镇), Qingshiju (青石咀镇), Quankou (泉口镇), Dongchuan (东川镇)

Townships:

- Beishan Township (北山乡), Malian Township (麻莲乡), Xitan Township (西滩乡), Yintian Township (阴田乡), Xianmi Township (སེམས་ཉིད།, 仙米乡), Zhugu Township (འབྲུ་གུ་, 珠固乡), Sujitan Township (苏吉滩乡)

Ethnic Township:

- Huangcheng Mongol Ethnic Township (皇城蒙古族乡)

== Haixi ==
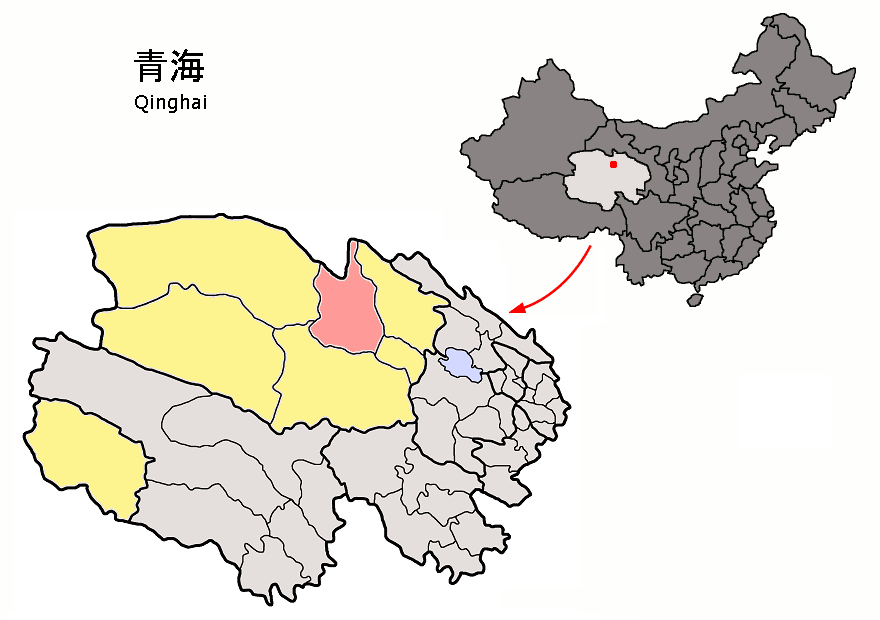
Location of Delingha in Qinghai (city in pink, rest of administrative area in yellow)

=== Delingha City ===
Subdistricts:

- Hexi Subdistrict (河西街道), Hedong Subdistrict (河东街道), Train station Subdistrict (火车站街道)

Towns:

- Gahai (尕海镇), Huaitou Tala (怀头他拉镇), Keluke (柯鲁柯镇)

Township:

- Xuji Township (蓄集乡)

=== Golmud City ===
Subdistricts:

- Kunlunlu Subdistrict (昆仑路街道), Jinfenglu Subdistrict (金峰路街道), Hexi Subdistrict (河西街道), Huanghelu Subdistrict (黄河路街道), Xizanglu Subdistrict (西藏路街道)

Towns:

- Tanggula (གདང་ལ་, 唐古拉镇), Guole Mude (郭勒木德镇)

Townships:

- Wutu Meiren Township (乌图美仁乡), Dagele Township (大格勒乡)

=== Mangnai ===
Towns: Mangnai (茫崖镇), Huatugou (花土沟镇), Lenghu (冷湖镇)

=== Ulan County ===
Towns:

- Xiligou (希里沟镇), Chaka (ཚྭ་ཁ་, 茶卡镇), Keke (柯柯镇), Tongpu (མཐོན་པོ་, 铜普镇)

=== Dulan County ===
Towns:

- Chahan Wusu (察汉乌苏镇), Xiangride (香日德镇), Xiariha (夏日哈镇), Zongjia (宗加镇)

Townships:

- Reshui Township (ཆུ་ཁོལ་, 热水乡), Xiangjia Township (香加乡), Gouli Township (沟里乡), Balong Township (巴隆乡)

=== Tianjun County ===
Towns:

- Xinyuan (新源镇), Muli (མུ་རི་, 木里镇), Jianghe (江河镇)

Townships:

- Kharmar Township (མཁར་དམར་, 快尔玛乡), Drugkyung Township (འབྲུག་ཁྱུང་, 舟群乡), Dragmar Township (བྲག་དམར་, 织合玛乡), Suli Township (苏里乡), Sengge Township (སེང་གེ་, 生格乡), Yagkeng Township (གཡག་ཁེངས་, 阳康乡), Lungmar Township (ལུང་དམར་, 龙门乡)

=== Da Qaidam Administrative Zone ===
Towns: Qaidam (柴旦镇), Xitieshan (锡铁山镇)

== Hainan ==
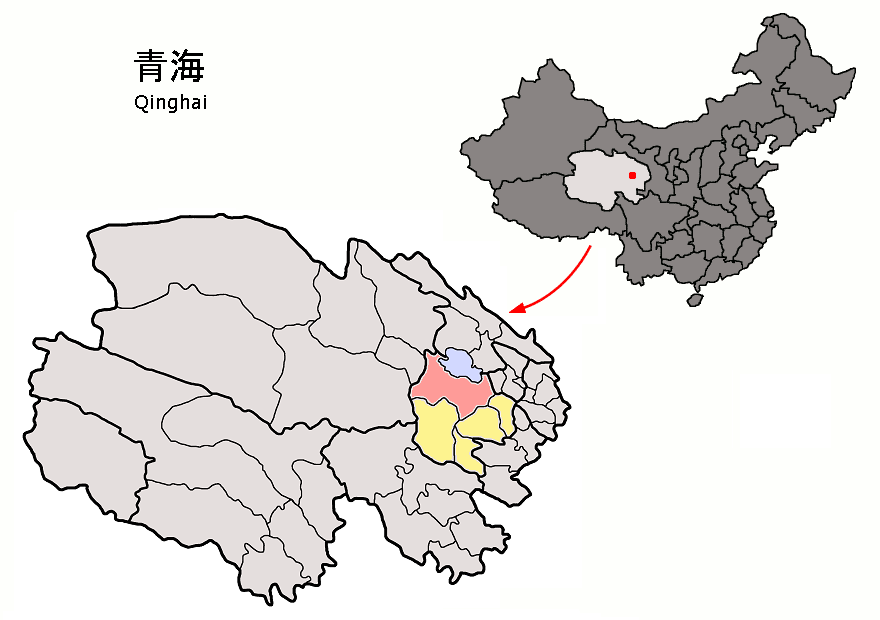
Location of Gonghe County in Qinghai (city in pink, rest of administrative area in yellow)

=== Gonghe County ===
Towns:

- Daotanghe (倒淌河镇), Heimanhe (黑马河乡), Jiangxigou (江西沟乡), Longyangxia (龙羊峡镇), Qiabuqia (恰卜恰镇), Shinaihai (石乃亥镇), Tanggemu (塘格木镇)

Townships:

- Niandi Township (廿地乡), Qieji Township (切吉乡), Shazhuyu Township (沙珠玉乡), Tiegai Township (铁盖乡)

=== Tongde County ===
Towns:

- Gabasongduo (尕巴松多镇), Tanggu (唐谷镇)

Townships:

- Bagou Township (巴沟乡), Hebei Township (河北乡), Xiuma Township (秀麻乡)

=== Guide County ===
Towns:

- Changmu (常牧镇), Hexi (河西镇), Heyin (河阴镇), Laxiwa (拉西瓦镇)

Townships:

- Garang Township (尕让乡), Hedong Township (河东乡)

Ethnic Townships:

- Xinjie Hui Ethnic Township (新街回族乡)

=== Xinghai County ===
Towns:

- Heka (河卡镇), Qushi'an (曲什安镇), Ziketan (子科滩镇)

Townships:

- Longzang Township (龙藏乡), Tangnaihai Township (唐乃亥乡), Wenquan Township (温泉乡), Zhongtie Township (中铁乡)

=== Guinan County ===
Towns:

- Guomaying (过马营镇), Mangqu (茫曲镇), Senduo (森多镇)

Townships:

- Mangla Township (茫拉乡), Shagou Township (沙沟乡), Taxiu Township (塔秀乡)

== Huangnan ==
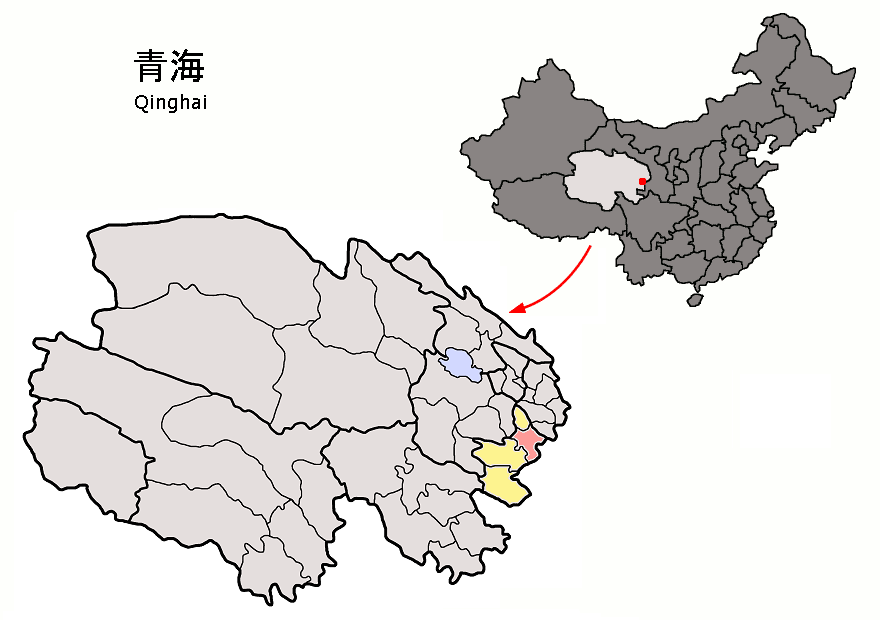
Location of Tongren County in Qinghai (city in pink, rest of administrative area in yellow)

=== Tongren County ===
Towns:

- Bao'an (保安镇), Duowa (多哇镇), Longwu (隆务镇)

Townships:

- Guashize Township (瓜什则乡), Huangnaihai Township (黄乃亥乡), Jiawu Township (加吾乡), Lancai Township (兰采乡), Nianduhu Township (年都乎乡), Qukuhu Township (曲库乎乡), Shuangpengxi Township (双朋西乡), Zhamao Township (扎毛乡)

=== Jainca County ===
Towns:

- Kanbula (坎布拉镇), Kangyang (康扬镇), Maketang (马克堂镇)

Townships:

- Angla Township (昂拉乡), Cuozhou Township (措周乡), Dangshun Township (当顺乡), Jiajia Township (贾加乡), Jianzhatan Township (尖扎滩乡), Nengke Township (能科乡)

=== Zêkog County ===
Towns:

- Heri (和日镇), Maixiu (麦秀镇), Ningxiu (宁秀镇), Zequ (泽曲镇)

Townships:

- Duohemao Township (多禾茂乡), Wangjia Township (王加乡), Xibusha Township (西卜沙乡)

=== Henan County ===
Towns:

- Youganning (优干宁镇), Ningmute (宁木特镇)

Townships:

- Duosong Township (多松乡), Kesheng Township (柯生乡), Sai'erlong Township (赛尔龙乡)

== Golog ==
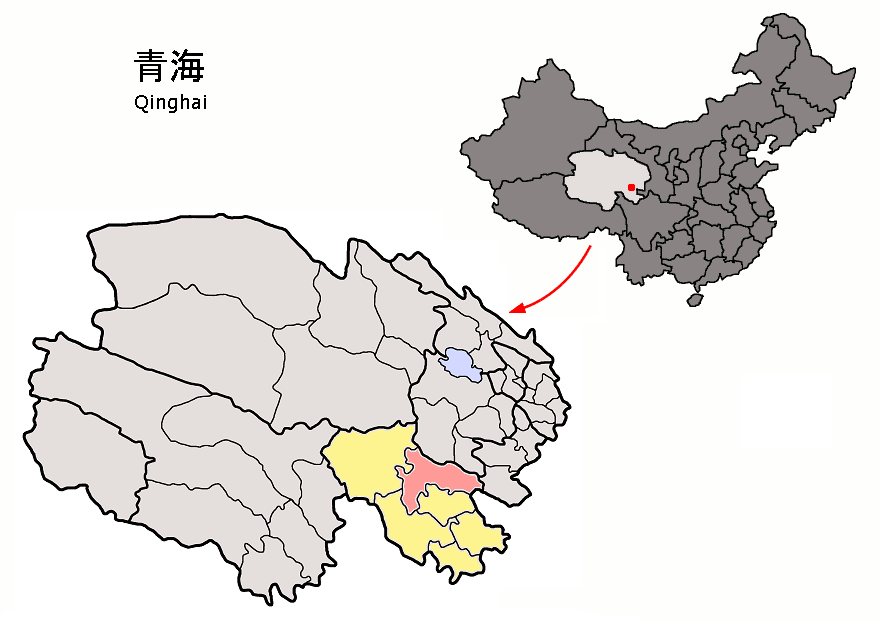
Location of Maqên County in Qinghai (city in pink, rest of administrative area in yellow)

=== Maqên County ===
Towns:

- Dawu (大武镇), Lajia (拉加镇),

Townships:

- Dangluo Township (当洛乡), Dawu Township (大武乡), Dongqinggou Township (东倾沟乡), Xiaduwu Township (下大武乡), Xueshan Township (雪山乡), Youyun Township (优云乡)

=== Baima County ===
Town:

- Sailaitang (赛来塘镇)

Townships:

- Daka Township (达卡乡), Dengta Township (灯塔乡), Duogongma Township (多贡麻乡), Jiangritang Township (江日堂乡), Jika Township (吉卡乡), Makehe Township (马可河乡), Ya'ertang Township (亚尔堂乡). Zhiqin Township (知钦乡)

=== Gadê County ===
Town:

- Kequ (柯曲镇)

Townships:

- Ganglong Township (岗龙乡), Jiangqian Township (江千乡), Qingzhen Township (青珍乡), Shanggongma Township (上贡麻乡), Xiagongma Township (下贡麻乡), Xiazangke Township (下藏科乡)

=== Darlag County ===
Town:

- Jimai (吉迈镇)

Townships:

- De'ang Township (德昂乡), Jianshe Township (建设乡), Manzhang Township (满掌乡), Moba Township (莫坝乡), Sangrima Township (桑日麻乡), Shanghongke Township (上红科乡), Tehetu Township (特合土乡), Wosai Township (窝赛乡), Xiahongke Township (下红科乡)

=== Jigzhi County ===
Town:

- Zhiqing Sonduo (智青松多镇)

Townships:

- Baiyu Township (白玉乡), Mentang Township (门堂乡), Suoha Rima Township (索呼日麻乡), Wa'eryi Township (哇尔依乡), Wasai Township (哇赛乡)

=== Madoi County ===
Towns:

- Huashixia (花石峡镇), Machaii (玛查理镇)

Townships:

- Huanghe Township (黄河乡), Zhalinghu Township (扎陵湖乡)

== Yushu ==
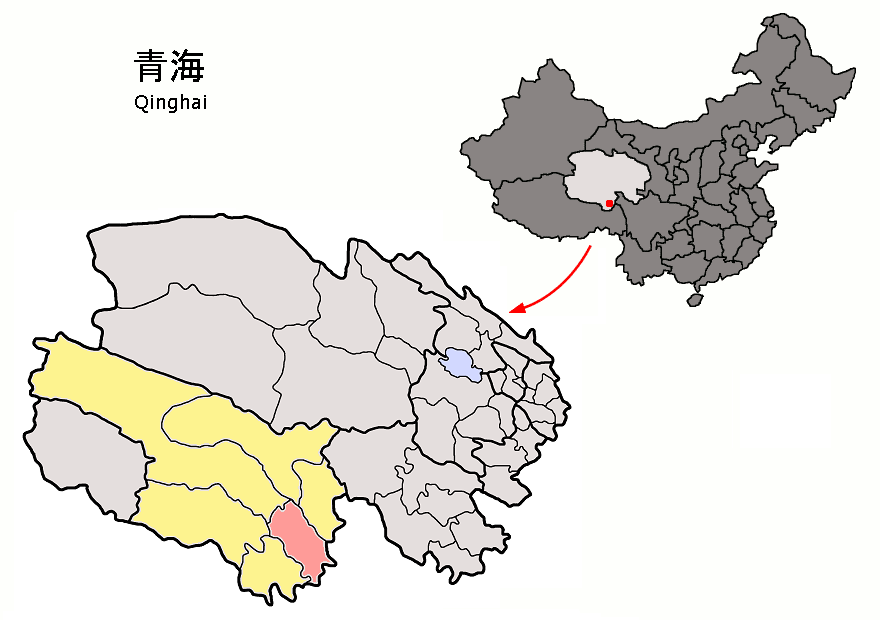
Location of Yushu City in Qinghai (city in pink, rest of administrative area in yellow)

=== Yushu City ===
Subdistricts:

- Jieguzhen Subdistrict (结古镇街道), Zhaxike Subdistrict (扎西科街道), Xihang Subdistrict (西杭街道), Xinzhai Subdistrict (新寨街道)

Towns:

- Longbao (隆宝镇), Laxiu (下拉秀镇)

Townships:

- Zhongda Township (仲达乡), Batang Township (巴塘乡), Xiaosu'mang Township (小苏莽乡), Shanglaxiu Township (上拉秀乡), Haxiu Township (哈秀乡), Anchong Township (安冲乡)

=== Zadoi County (Zaduo County) ===
Town:

- Sahuteng (萨呼腾镇)

Townships:

- Angsai Township (昂赛乡), Jieduo Township (结多乡), Aduo Township (阿多乡), Sulu Township (苏鲁乡), Chadan Township (查旦乡), Moyun Township (莫云乡), Zhaqing Township (扎青乡)

=== Chindu County (Chenduo County) ===
Towns:

- Chengwen (称文镇), Xiewu (歇武镇), Zhaduo (扎朵镇), Qingshuihe (清水河镇), Zhenqin (珍秦镇)

Townships:

- Gaduo Township (尕朵乡), Labu Township (拉布乡)

=== Zhidoi County (Zhiduo County) ===
Town:

- Jiajiboluoge (加吉博洛格镇)

Townships:

- Suojia Township (索加乡), Zhahe Township (扎河乡), Duocai Township (多彩乡), Zhiqu Township (治渠乡), Lixin Township (立新乡)

=== Nangchen County (Nangqian County) ===
Town:

- Xiangda (香达镇)

Townships:

- Baizha Township (白扎乡), Jiqu Township (吉曲乡), Niangla Township (娘拉乡), Maozhuang Township (毛庄乡), Juela Township (觉拉乡), Dongba Township (东坝乡), Gayang Township (尕羊乡), Jinisai Township (吉尼赛乡), Zhexiao Township (着晓乡)

=== Qumarlêb County (Qumalai County) ===
Town:

- Yuegai (约改镇)

Townships:

- Bagan Township (巴干乡), Qiuzhi Township (秋智乡), Yege Township (叶格乡), Maduo Township (麻多乡), Qumahe Township (曲麻河乡)

== See also ==
- List of administrative divisions of Qinghai, for prefectures and counties only
