= China National Highway 573 =

National highway in China

National Highway 573
- 573国道

Route information
- Length: 225 km (140 mi)

Major junctions
- From: Zêkog, Qinghai
- G214 G227 G213
- To: Xinghai, Qinghai

Location
- Country: China

Highway system
- National Trunk Highway System; Primary; Auxiliary
← G572	→ G574

China National Highway 573 runs from Zêkog to Xinghai, both in Qinghai. It is one of the new trunk highways proposed in the China National Highway Network Planning (2013 - 2030).

== Route table ==
City	Distance (km)
Zêkog	0
Tongde	119
Xinghai	225

== See also ==
- China National Highways
