= Ashinu Township, Qinghai =

Ashinu Township 阿什努乡
- Township
- Ashinuxiang
- Location in Qinghai
- Coordinates: 36°0′27″N 102°6′36″E
- Country: China
- Province: Qinghai
- Prefecture-level city: Haidong
- Autonomous County: Hualong

Area
  - Total: 101.3 km^{2} (39.1 sq mi)

Population (2020)
  - Total: 2,906
  - Density: 28.69/km^{2} (74.30/sq mi)
- Time zone: UTC+8 (China Standard)
- Local dialing code: 972

Ashinu Township (Chinese: 阿什努乡) is a township in Hualong Hui Autonomous County, Haidong, Qinghai, China. In 2010, Ashinu Township had a total population of 3,881: 1,981 males and 1,900 females: 1,156 aged under 14, 2,508 aged between 15 and 65 and 217 aged over 65.
