= Xiejiatan Township =

Xiejiatan Township 谢家滩乡
- Township
- Xiejiatanxiang
- Location in Qinghai
- Coordinates: 36°4′59″N 102°16′37″E
- Country: China
- Province: Qinghai
- Prefecture-level city: Haidong
- Autonomous County: Hualong

Area
  - Total: 70.59 km^{2} (27.25 sq mi)

Population (2020)
  - Total: 5,469
  - Density: 77.48/km^{2} (200.7/sq mi)
- Time zone: UTC+8 (China Standard)
- Local dialing code: 972

Xiejiatan Township (Chinese: 谢家滩乡) is a township in Hualong Hui Autonomous County, Haidong, Qinghai, China. In 2010, Xiejiatan Township had a total population of 6,671: 3,392 males and 3,279 females: 1,674 aged under 14, 4,540 aged between 15 and 65 and 457 aged over 65.
