= Ertang Township, Qinghai =

Ertang Township 二塘乡
- Township
- Ertangxiang
- Location in Qinghai
- Coordinates: 36°8′8″N 102°11′49″E
- Country: China
- Province: Qinghai
- Prefecture-level city: Haidong
- Autonomous County: Hualong

Area
  - Total: 113 km^{2} (44 sq mi)

Population (2010)
  - Total: 8,244
  - Density: 73.0/km^{2} (189/sq mi)
- Time zone: UTC+8 (China Standard)
- Local dialing code: 972

Ertang Township (Chinese: 二塘乡) is a township in Hualong Hui Autonomous County, Haidong, Qinghai, China. In 2010, Ertang Township had a total population of 8,244: 4,095 males and 4,149 females: 2,331 aged under 14, 5,394 aged between 15 and 65 and 519 aged over 65.
