= Shidacang Township =

Shidacang Township 石大仓乡
- Township
- Shidacangxiang
- Location in Qinghai
- Coordinates: 36°5′59″N 102°21′24″E
- Country: China
- Province: Qinghai
- Prefecture-level city: Haidong
- Autonomous County: Hualong

Area
  - Total: 194.2 km^{2} (75.0 sq mi)

Population (2020)
  - Total: 4,288
  - Density: 22.08/km^{2} (57.19/sq mi)
- Time zone: UTC+8 (China Standard)
- Postal code: 810902
- Local dialing code: 972

Shidacang Township (Chinese: 石大仓乡) is a township in Hualong Hui Autonomous County, Haidong, Qinghai, China. In 2010, Shidacang Township had a total population of 5,721: 2,896 males and 2,825 females:1,654 aged under 14, 3,687 aged between 15 and 65 and 380 aged over 65.
