= Chuma Township, Qinghai =

Chuma Township 初麻乡
- Township
- Chumaxiang
- Location in Qinghai
- Coordinates: 36°6′25″N 102°26′58″E
- Country: China
- Province: Qinghai
- Prefecture-level city: Haidong
- Autonomous County: Hualong

Area
  - Total: 188.89 km^{2} (72.93 sq mi)

Population (2020)
  - Total: 4,734
  - Density: 25.06/km^{2} (64.91/sq mi)
- Time zone: UTC+8 (China Standard)
- Local dialing code: 972

Chuma Township (Chinese: 初麻乡) is a township in Hualong Hui Autonomous County, Haidong, Qinghai, China. In 2010, Chuma Township had a total population of 5,841: 2,971 males and 2,870 females:1,641 aged under 14, 3,858 aged between 15 and 65 and 342 aged over 65.
