= Banduo Hydropower Station =

Banduo Hydropower Station 班多水电站
- Location within Qinghai Location within China
- Country: China
- Location: in the upper reaches of the Yellow River
- Coordinates: 35.31°N 100.27°E
- Purpose: Power
- Construction began: September 7, 2007
- Construction cost: ¥2.118 billion

The Banduo Hydropower Station (Chinese: 班多水电站), also spelled Banduo Hydropower Plant, is a water conservancy project in Qinghai of China located at the exit of Ciha Gorge (茨哈峡) of the Yellow River at the junction of Xinghai County and Tongde County. The main task of the hydropower plant is to generate electricity and not to undertake downstream flood control.

== History ==
On September 7, 2007, the preliminary construction of Banduo Hydropower Station started. On October 23, 2010, the power plant was lowered to store water.

On November 26, 2010, the first unit of the plant was put into operation, and on December 18, 2010, the second unit was put into operation, and in May 2011, its last generating unit was connected to the grid.

Banduo Hydropower Station is one of the backbone power sources of the North Passage of the "West–East Electricity Transmission Project" (西电东送) in China and was a key project during the "Eleventh Five-Year Plan" period in Qinghai Province. The total investment in the project is about ¥2.118 billion, and its total installed capacity is 360,000 kilowatts.
