= Shalianbao Township, Qinghai =

Shalianbao Township 沙连堡乡
- Township
- Shalianbaoxiang
- Location in Qinghai
- Coordinates: 36°0′27″N 102°6′36″E
- Country: China
- Province: Qinghai
- Prefecture-level city: Haidong
- Autonomous County: Hualong

Area
  - Total: 94.89 km^{2} (36.64 sq mi)

Population (2020)
  - Total: 4,185
  - Density: 44.10/km^{2} (114.2/sq mi)
- Time zone: UTC+8 (China Standard)
- Local dialing code: 972

Shalianbao Township (Chinese: 沙连堡乡) is a township in Hualong Hui Autonomous County, Haidong, Qinghai, China. In 2010, Shalianbao Township had a total population of 4,106: 2,061 males and 2,045 females: 1,353 aged under 14, 2,493 aged between 15 and 65 and 260 aged over 65.
