= Baiyu =

Baiyu may refer to:

- Baiyu (singer), singer-songwriter and actress
- Palyul (Baiyu County, 白玉县), Garzê Prefecture, Sichuan, China
- Baiyu River, or Yurungkash River, river in the south of Xinjiang, China
- Baiyu (百育镇), town in Guangxi, China
- Baiyu (Jigzhi) (白玉乡), township in Jigzhi County, Qinghai, China
- Baiyu (grape), or Rkatsiteli, kind of grape used to produce white wine
