= Hualong Hui Autonomous County =

Hualong 化隆县 · خُوَلْو
- Autonomous County
- 化隆回族自治县 · خُوَلْو خُوِذُو ذِجِشِیًا; Hualong Hui Autonomous County
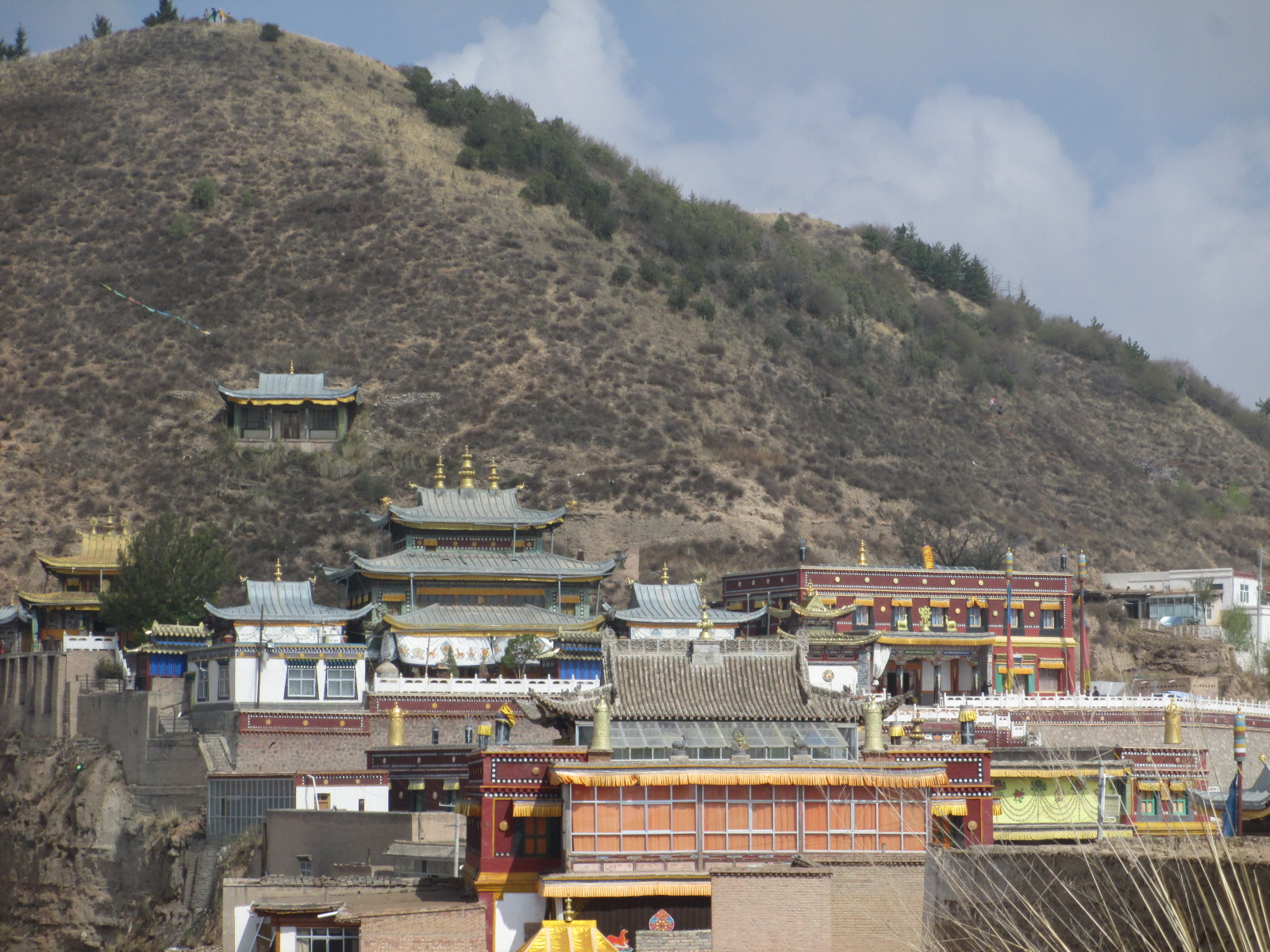

- Location of the seat in Qinghai
- Coordinates: 36°05′N 102°12′E
- Country: China
- Province: Qinghai
- Prefecture-level city: Haidong
- County seat: Bayan

Area
  - Total: 2,740 km^{2} (1,060 sq mi)

Population (2020)
  - Total: 200,474
  - Density: 73.2/km^{2} (189/sq mi)
- Time zone: UTC+8 (China Standard)
- Website: www.hdhl.gov.cn

Hualong Hui Autonomous County

Chinese name
- Simplified Chinese: 化隆回族自治縣
- Traditional Chinese: 化隆回族自治縣
Transcriptions
Standard Mandarin
- Hanyu Pinyin: Huàlóng Huízú Zìzhìxiàn

Tibetan name
- Tibetan: བ་ཡན་ཧུའེ་རིགས་རང་སྐྱོང་རྫོང་།
Transcriptions
- Wylie: ba yan huʼe rigs rang skyong rdzong

Hualong Hui Autonomous County (simplified Chinese: 化隆回族自治县; traditional Chinese: 化隆回族自治縣; pinyin: Huàlóng Huízú Zìzhìxiàn; Xiao'erjing: خُوَلْو خُوِذُو ذِجِشِیًا) is a county in the east of Qinghai Province, China. It is under the administration of Haidong City. Its area is 2,790 square kilometers and has a population of 203,317 in 2010.

== Administrative divisions ==
Hualong is divided into 6 towns, 7 townships, and 4 ethnic townships.

- Bayan Town (巴燕镇, བཱ་ཡན་གྲོང་རྡལ།)
- Qunke Town (群科镇, ཚའཱི་མགུར་གྲོང་རྡལ།)
- Yashiga Town (牙什尕镇, ཡར་ག་གྲོང་རྡལ།)
- Gandu Town (甘都镇, ཀ་མདོ་གྲོང་རྡལ།)
- Zhaba Town (扎巴镇, རྩ་བ་གྲོང་རྡལ།)
- Angsiduo Town (昂思多镇, ནང་སྟོད་གྲོང་རྡལ།)
- Chuma Township (初麻乡, ཆུ་དམར་ཞང་།)
- Ertang Township (二塘乡, ཨེར་ཐང་ཞང་།)
- Xiejiatan Township (谢家滩乡)
- Dehenglong Township (德恒隆乡, སྟག་ལུང་ཞང་།)
- Shalianbao Township (沙连堡乡, ས་ལེན་པུའུ་ཞང་།)
- Ashennu Township (阿什奴乡, ཨ་སྔོན་ཞང་།)
- Shidacang Township (石大仓乡, སྟག་ཚང་ཞང་།)
- Shongshen Tibetan Ethnic Township (雄先藏族乡, གཤོང་ཤན་བོད་རིགས་ཞང་།)
- Tsaphug Tibetan Ethnic Township (查甫藏族乡, ཚ་ཕུག་བོད་རིགས་ཞང་།)
- Thagya Tibetan Ethnic Township (塔加藏族乡, ཐ་རྒྱ་བོད་རིགས་ཞང་།)
- Serzhong Tibetan Ethnic Township (金源藏族乡, གསེར་གཞོང་བོད་རིགས་ཞང་།)

== Climate ==
Climate data for Hualong, elevation 2,835 m (9,301 ft), (1991–2020 normals, extremes 1981–2010)
Month	Jan	Feb	Mar	Apr	May	Jun	Jul	Aug	Sep	Oct	Nov	Dec	Year
Record high °C (°F)	12.4 (54.3)	16.6 (61.9)	22.1 (71.8)	28.0 (82.4)	26.4 (79.5)	27.7 (81.9)	32.5 (90.5)	29.3 (84.7)	25.1 (77.2)	19.8 (67.6)	15.7 (60.3)	12.5 (54.5)	32.5 (90.5)
Mean daily maximum °C (°F)	−1.0 (30.2)	2.1 (35.8)	6.7 (44.1)	12.2 (54.0)	15.5 (59.9)	18.5 (65.3)	20.6 (69.1)	19.8 (67.6)	15.4 (59.7)	10.4 (50.7)	5.4 (41.7)	0.6 (33.1)	10.5 (50.9)
Daily mean °C (°F)	−9.5 (14.9)	−6.3 (20.7)	−1.1 (30.0)	4.6 (40.3)	8.8 (47.8)	12.3 (54.1)	14.3 (57.7)	13.3 (55.9)	9.2 (48.6)	3.5 (38.3)	−2.7 (27.1)	−7.8 (18.0)	3.2 (37.8)
Mean daily minimum °C (°F)	−15.5 (4.1)	−12.5 (9.5)	−6.9 (19.6)	−1.6 (29.1)	2.9 (37.2)	6.7 (44.1)	8.8 (47.8)	8.1 (46.6)	4.7 (40.5)	−1.1 (30.0)	−8.0 (17.6)	−13.7 (7.3)	−2.3 (27.8)
Record low °C (°F)	−26.8 (−16.2)	−24.4 (−11.9)	−20.6 (−5.1)	−12.1 (10.2)	−10.6 (12.9)	−0.7 (30.7)	0.4 (32.7)	0.1 (32.2)	−3.6 (25.5)	−12.9 (8.8)	−20.7 (−5.3)	−27.0 (−16.6)	−27.0 (−16.6)
Average precipitation mm (inches)	2.6 (0.10)	4.1 (0.16)	11.2 (0.44)	23.4 (0.92)	60.0 (2.36)	73.4 (2.89)	91.9 (3.62)	98.4 (3.87)	68.8 (2.71)	28.1 (1.11)	5.3 (0.21)	1.6 (0.06)	468.8 (18.45)
Average precipitation days (≥ 0.1 mm)	4.1	5.4	7.3	8.6	13.6	16.8	16.6	16.0	15.0	9.2	4.0	2.7	119.3
Average snowy days	5.6	7.6	9.6	8.2	3.8	0.2	0	0	0.6	6.1	5.4	4.2	51.3
Average relative humidity (%)	48	49	51	52	58	64	69	73	76	70	56	48	60
Mean monthly sunshine hours	215.0	202.5	220.8	226.0	224.3	210.1	220.3	212.7	171.1	197.9	216.5	221.1	2,538.3
Percentage possible sunshine	69	65	59	57	51	48	50	51	47	58	71	74	58
Source: China Meteorological Administration

== See also ==
- List of administrative divisions of Qinghai
