= Dehenglong Township, Qinghai =

Dehenglong Township 德恒隆乡
- Township
- Dehenglongxiang
- Location in Qinghai
- Coordinates: 35°58′30″N 102°8′44″E
- Country: China
- Province: Qinghai
- Prefecture-level city: Haidong
- Autonomous County: Hualong

Area
  - Total: 247.4 km^{2} (95.5 sq mi)

Population (2020)
  - Total: 7,167
  - Density: 28.97/km^{2} (75.03/sq mi)
- Time zone: UTC+8 (China Standard)
- Local dialing code: 972

Dehenglong Township (Chinese: 德恒隆乡) is a township in Hualong Hui Autonomous County, Haidong, Qinghai, China. In 2010, Dehenglong Township had a total population of 9,699: 4,938 males and 4,761 females: 2,923 aged under 14, 6,193 aged between 15 and 65 and 583 aged over 65.
