= Bagou Township, Qinghai =

Bagou Township 巴沟乡
- Township
- Bagouxiang
- Location in Qinghai
- Coordinates: 35°16′20″N 100°24′6″E
- Country: People's Republic of China
- Province: Qinghai
- Autonomous prefecture: Hainan Tibetan Autonomous Prefecture
- County: Tongde County

Area
  - Total: 463.8 km^{2} (179.1 sq mi)

Population (2010)
  - Total: 8,140
  - Density: 17.6/km^{2} (45.5/sq mi)
- Time zone: UTC+8 (China Standard)
- Local dialing code: 974

Bagou Township (Chinese: 巴沟乡) is a township under the jurisdiction of Tongde County, Hainan Tibetan Autonomous Prefecture, Qinghai, China. In 2010, Bagou Township had a total population of 8,140: 4,111 males and 4,029 females: 1,844 under 14, 5,811 aged between 15 and 64 and 445 over 65 years old.
