= Yashiga, Qinghai =

Yashiga 牙什尕镇
- Town
- Yashigazhen
- Location in Qinghai
- Coordinates: 36°4′9″N 101°55′53″E
- Country: China
- Province: Qinghai
- Prefecture-level city: Haidong
- Autonomous County: Hualong

Area
  - Total: 87.20 km^{2} (33.67 sq mi)

Population (2020)
  - Total: 13,787
  - Density: 158.1/km^{2} (409.5/sq mi)
- Time zone: UTC+8 (China Standard)
- Postal code: 810904
- Local dialing code: 972

Yashiga (Chinese: 牙什尕镇) is a town in Hualong Hui Autonomous County, Haidong, Qinghai, China. In 2010, Yashiga had a total population of 13,580 people: 6,576 males and 7,004 females: 3,967 under 14 years old, 8,765 aged between 15 and 64 and 848 over 65 years old.
