= Jinyuan Township, Qinghai =

Serzhong Tibetan Township 金源藏族乡 གསེར་གཞོང་བོད་རིགས་ཞང་། Jinyuan
- Ethnic township
- Location in Qinghai
- Coordinates: 36°4′3″N 102°30′50″E
- Country: China
- Province: Qinghai
- Prefecture-level city: Haidong
- Autonomous County: Hualong

Area
  - Total: 314.9 km^{2} (121.6 sq mi)

Population (2020)
  - Total: 5,949
  - Density: 18.89/km^{2} (48.93/sq mi)
- Time zone: UTC+8 (China Standard)
- Local dialing code: 972

Serzhong Tibetan Township (Tibetan: གསེར་གཞོང་བོད་རིགས་ཞང་།, Chinese: 金源藏族乡) or Jinyuan Township, is a township in Hualong Hui Autonomous County, Haidong, Qinghai, China. In 2010, Jinyuan Township had a total population of 6,551: 3,364 males and 3,187 females: 1,810 aged under 14, 4,343 aged between 15 and 65 and 398 aged over 65.
