= Duohemao Township, Qinghai =

Duohemao Township 多禾茂乡
- Township
- Duohemaoxiang
- Location in Qinghai
- Coordinates: 35°4′3″N 101°49′5″E
- Country: People's Republic of China
- Province: Qinghai
- Autonomous prefecture: Huangnan Tibetan Autonomous Prefecture
- County: Zêkog County

Area
  - Total: 1,141 km^{2} (441 sq mi)

Population (2010)
  - Total: 8,192
  - Density: 7.180/km^{2} (18.60/sq mi)
- Time zone: UTC+8 (China Standard)
- Local dialing code: 973

Duohemao Township (Chinese: 多禾茂乡) is a township in Zêkog County, Huangnan Tibetan Autonomous Prefecture, Qinghai, China. In 2010, Duohemao Township had a total population of 8,912: 4,865 males and 4,406 females: 2,717 aged under 14, 5,704 aged between 15 and 65 and 491 aged over 65.
