= Zhalinghu Township, Qinghai =

Co'gyarêng Township 扎陵湖乡 · མཚོ་སྐྱ་རེངས་ཡུལ་ཚོ། Zhalinghu Township, Gyaringco Township
- Township
- Location in Qinghai
- Coordinates: 35°5′6″N 97°54′38″E
- Country: China
- Province: Qinghai
- Autonomous prefecture: Golog
- County: Madoi

Area
  - Total: 6,381 km^{2} (2,464 sq mi)

Population (2010)
  - Total: 1,245
  - Density: 0.1951/km^{2} (0.5053/sq mi)
- Time zone: UTC+8 (China Standard)
- Local dialing code: 975

Co'gyarêng Township or Zhalinghu Township (Tibetan: མཚོ་སྐྱ་རེངས་ཡུལ་ཚོ།, Chinese: 扎陵湖乡) is a township in Madoi County, Golog Tibetan Autonomous Prefecture, Qinghai, China. In 2010, Co'gyarêng Township had a total population of 1,245: 630 males and 615 females: 397 aged under 14, 811 aged between 15 and 65 and 37 aged over 65.
