= Bayan, Qinghai =

Bayan 巴燕镇
- Town
- Bayanzhen
- Location in Qinghai
- Coordinates: 36°6′23″N 102°15′17″E
- Country: China
- Province: Qinghai
- Prefecture-level city: Haidong
- Autonomous County: Hualong

Area
  - Total: 152.8 km^{2} (59.0 sq mi)

Population (2020)
  - Total: 33,146
  - Density: 216.9/km^{2} (561.8/sq mi)
- Time zone: UTC+8 (China Standard)
- Local dialing code: 972

Bayan (Chinese: 巴燕镇) is a town in Hualong Hui Autonomous County, Haidong, Qinghai, China. In 2010, Bayan had a total population of 38,315: 19,390 males and 18,925 females: 9,334 aged under 14, 26,934 aged between 15 and 65 and 2,047 aged over 65.
