= Xiongxian Township, Qinghai =

Shongshen Tibetan Township 雄先藏族乡 གཤོང་ཤན་བོད་རིགས་ཞང་། Xiongxian
- Ethnic township
- Location in Qinghai
- Coordinates: 36°31′4″N 101°9′26″E
- Country: China
- Province: Qinghai
- Prefecture-level city: Haidong
- Autonomous County: Hualong

Area
  - Total: 183.03 km^{2} (70.67 sq mi)

Population (2020)
  - Total: 7,391
  - Density: 40.38/km^{2} (104.6/sq mi)
- Time zone: UTC+8 (China Standard)
- Local dialing code: 972

Shongshen Tibetan Township (Tibetan: གཤོང་ཤན་བོད་རིགས་ཞང་།, Chinese: 雄先藏族乡) or Xiongxian Township, is a township in Hualong Hui Autonomous County, Haidong, Qinghai, China. In 2010, Xiongxian Township had a total population of 8,233: 4,386 males and 3,847 females: 1,864 aged under 14, 5,955 aged between 15 and 65 and 414 aged over 65.
