= Hebei Township, Qinghai =

Hebei Township 河北乡
- Township
- Location in Qinghai
- Coordinates (Hebei Township government): 34°43′16″N 100°47′50″E
- Country: People's Republic of China
- Province: Qinghai
- Autonomous prefecture: Hainan
- County: Tongde
- Time zone: UTC+8 (China Standard)

Hebei Township (simplified Chinese: 河北乡; traditional Chinese: 河北鄉; pinyin: Héběi Xiāng) is a township under the administration of Tongde County, in eastern Qinghai, China. As of 2020, it has two residential communities and ten villages under its administration:

- Saitang Community (赛堂社区)
- Dou'erzong Community (斗尔宗社区)
- Saitang Village (赛堂村)
- Sairuo Village (赛若村)
- Geshige Village (格什格村)
- Huanghe Village (黄河村)
- Xiazhimai Village (下知迈村)
- Saiqing Village (赛青村)
- Saiyang Village (赛羊村)
- Shangzhimai Village (上知迈村)
- Jinke Village (金科村)
- Saide Village (赛德村)
