= Heri Township, Qinghai =

Heri Township 和日乡
- Township
- Herixiang
- Location in Qinghai
- Coordinates: 35°13′52″N 100°59′23″E
- Country: People's Republic of China
- Province: Qinghai
- Autonomous prefecture: Huangnan Tibetan Autonomous Prefecture
- County: Zêkog County

Area
  - Total: 1,099 km^{2} (424 sq mi)

Population (2010)
  - Total: 10,881
  - Density: 9.901/km^{2} (25.64/sq mi)
- Time zone: UTC+8 (China Standard)
- Local dialing code: 973

Heri Township (Chinese: 和日乡) is a township under the jurisdiction of Zêkog County, Huangnan Tibetan Autonomous Prefecture, Qinghai, China. In 2010, Heri Township had a total population of 10,881: 5,563 males and 5,318 females: 3,354 aged under 14, 6,983 aged between 15 and 65 and 544 aged over 65.
