= Madoi County =

Madoi County རྨ་སྟོད་རྫོང · 玛多县 Matö, Maduo
- County
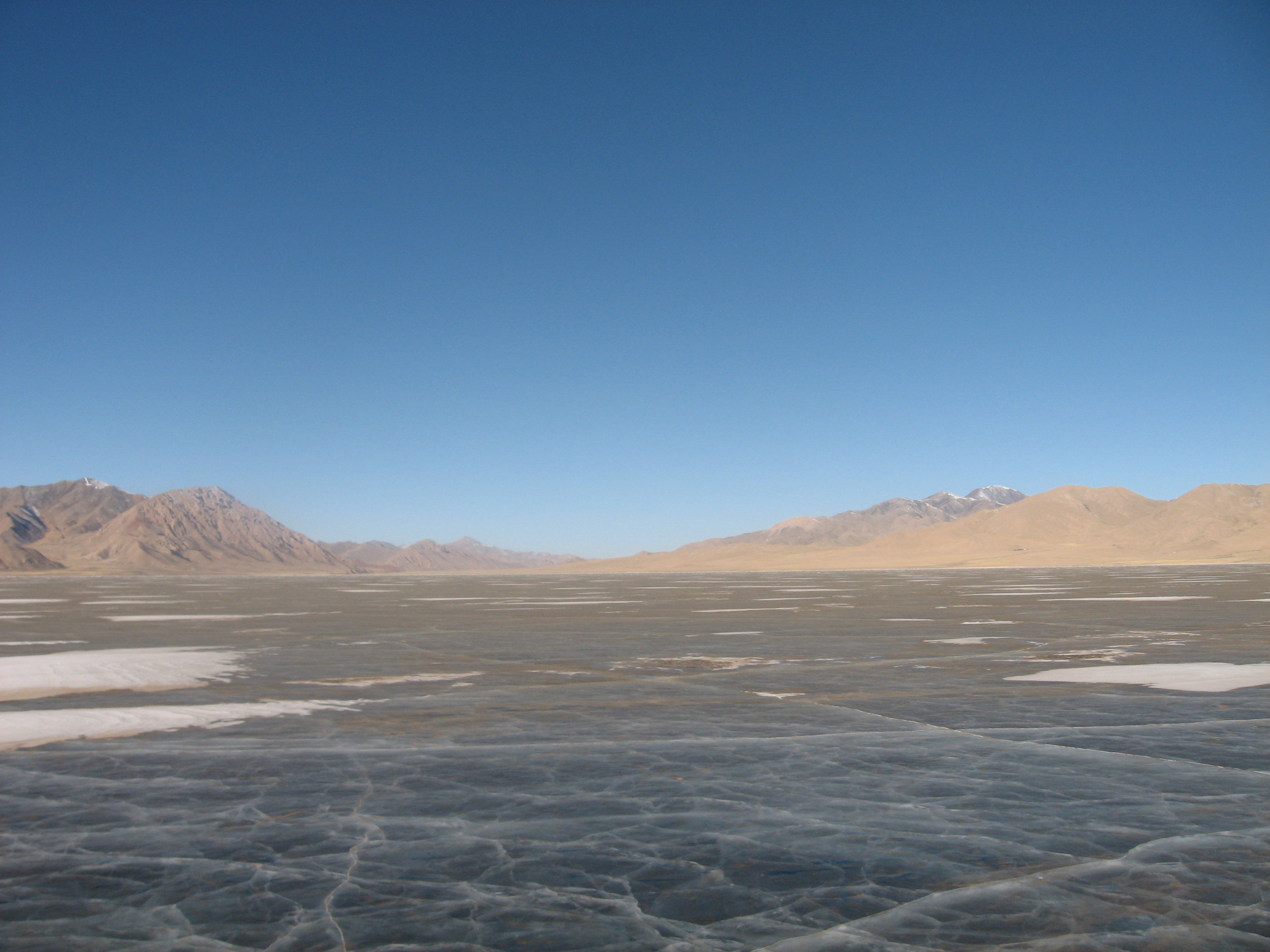

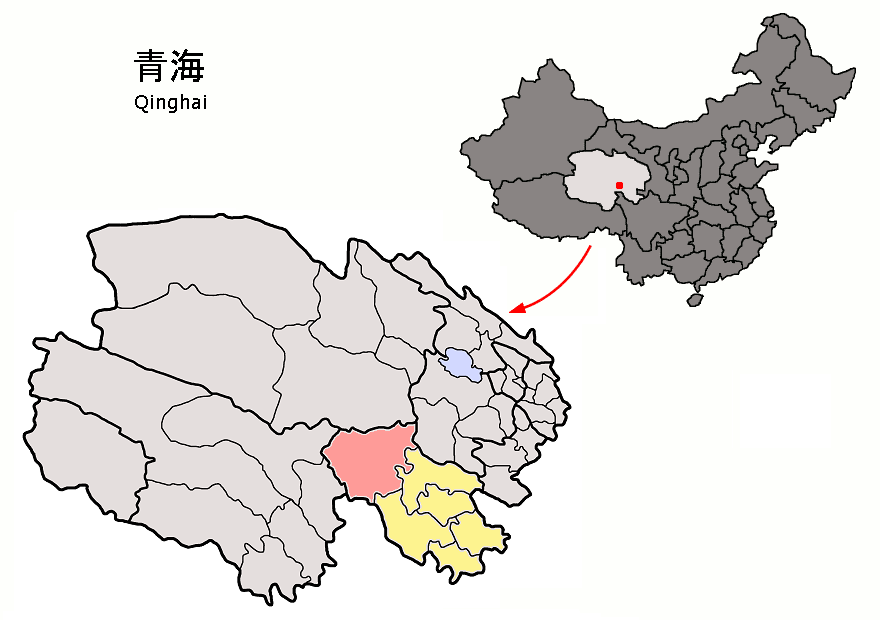
- Madoi County (light red) within Golog Prefecture (yellow) and Qinghai

- Location in Qinghai
- Coordinates: 34°42′N 98°13′E
- Country: China
- Province: Qinghai
- Autonomous prefecture: Golog
- County seat: Machali

Area
  - Total: 25,253 km^{2} (9,750 sq mi)

Population (2020)
  - Total: 14,490
  - Density: 0.5738/km^{2} (1.486/sq mi)
- Time zone: UTC+8 (China Standard)
- Website: www.jiuzhixian.gov.cn

Madoi County

Chinese name
- Simplified Chinese: 玛多县
- Traditional Chinese: 瑪多縣
Transcriptions
Standard Mandarin
- Hanyu Pinyin: Mǎduō Xiàn

Tibetan name
- Tibetan: རྨ་སྟོད་རྫོང
Transcriptions
- Wylie: rma stod rdzong
- Tibetan Pinyin: Madoi Zong

Madoi County (Tibetan: རྨ་སྟོད་རྫོང; Chinese: 玛多县; also Matö County or Maduo County) is a county of Golog Tibetan Autonomous Prefecture, in southeast-central Qinghai province, bordering Sichuan to the south. Its area is about 25,000 km^{2} (9,700 sq mi), and with an average elevation of 4,300 m (14,000 ft) it is the highest Chinese county by average elevation. In Madoi County is the upper stream of the Yellow River which flows to Ngoring and Gyaring lake.

== Geography and Climate ==
With an elevation of around 4,300 m (14,000 ft), Madoi County has an alpine climate (Köppen EH), with long, bitterly cold and very dry winters, and brief, rainy, cool summers. Average low temperatures are below freezing from early September to mid June; however, due to the wide diurnal temperature variation, average highs are only below freezing from early November thru mid March. Despite frequent rain during summer, when a majority of days sees rain, no month has less than 50% of possible sunshine; with monthly percent possible sunshine ranging from 53% in June to 79% in November, the county seat receives 2,838 hours of bright sunshine annually. The monthly 24-hour average temperature ranges from −15.7 °C (3.7 °F) in January to 8.0 °C (46.4 °F) in July, while the annual mean is −3.33 °C (26.0 °F), making the county seat one of the coldest locales nationwide in terms of annual mean temperature. Nearly three-fourths of the annual precipitation of 332 mm (13.1 in) is delivered from June to September.

On January 2, 1978, the lowest temperature ever recorded in Qinghai was −48.1 °C (−54.6 °F) at Madoi.

Climate data for Madoi County, elevation 4,272 m (14,016 ft), (1991–2020 normals, extremes 1971–present)
Month	Jan	Feb	Mar	Apr	May	Jun	Jul	Aug	Sep	Oct	Nov	Dec	Year
Record high °C (°F)	4.2 (39.6)	7.6 (45.7)	11.5 (52.7)	16.2 (61.2)	18.7 (65.7)	22.4 (72.3)	24.3 (75.7)	24.4 (75.9)	20.2 (68.4)	17.9 (64.2)	6.0 (42.8)	5.4 (41.7)	24.4 (75.9)
Mean daily maximum °C (°F)	−6.7 (19.9)	−3.5 (25.7)	0.3 (32.5)	5.1 (41.2)	8.7 (47.7)	11.7 (53.1)	14.4 (57.9)	14.4 (57.9)	10.8 (51.4)	4.4 (39.9)	−1.5 (29.3)	−5.4 (22.3)	4.4 (39.9)
Daily mean °C (°F)	−15.2 (4.6)	−11.8 (10.8)	−7.6 (18.3)	−2.2 (28.0)	2.1 (35.8)	5.8 (42.4)	8.4 (47.1)	8.0 (46.4)	4.3 (39.7)	−2.3 (27.9)	−9.5 (14.9)	−14.2 (6.4)	−2.8 (26.9)
Mean daily minimum °C (°F)	−22.1 (−7.8)	−18.7 (−1.7)	−13.9 (7.0)	−8.3 (17.1)	−3.3 (26.1)	0.9 (33.6)	3.3 (37.9)	2.9 (37.2)	−0.3 (31.5)	−6.9 (19.6)	−15.6 (3.9)	−21.1 (−6.0)	−8.6 (16.5)
Record low °C (°F)	−48.1 (−54.6)	−36.3 (−33.3)	−32.4 (−26.3)	−19.7 (−3.5)	−20.0 (−4.0)	−7.1 (19.2)	−3.7 (25.3)	−6.2 (20.8)	−11.4 (11.5)	−23.0 (−9.4)	−33.3 (−27.9)	−38.8 (−37.8)	−48.1 (−54.6)
Average precipitation mm (inches)	4.2 (0.17)	4.6 (0.18)	8.9 (0.35)	12.1 (0.48)	35.1 (1.38)	64.2 (2.53)	77.3 (3.04)	69.3 (2.73)	47.8 (1.88)	20.1 (0.79)	4.7 (0.19)	2.3 (0.09)	350.6 (13.81)
Average precipitation days (≥ 0.1 mm)	6.3	7.5	9.6	9.7	15.5	17.7	18.1	15.4	16.4	12.3	5.2	4.1	137.8
Average snowy days	9.4	9.9	13.1	13.0	17.2	10.7	4.5	4.1	11.1	15.6	7.9	5.8	122.3
Average relative humidity (%)	51	47	48	47	56	64	65	64	65	60	52	48	56
Mean monthly sunshine hours	229.3	213.8	248.2	261.2	252.4	216.2	237.7	237.0	215.5	241.5	238.5	236.9	2,828.2
Percentage possible sunshine	73	69	66	66	58	50	54	58	59	70	78	78	65
Source: China Meteorological Administration all-time extreme temperature

== Administrative divisions ==
Madoi is divided into two towns and two townships:

Name	Simplified Chinese	Hanyu Pinyin	Tibetan	Wylie	Administrative division code
Towns
Machali Town	玛查理镇	Mǎchálǐ Zhèn	རྨ་ཕྲ་ལི་གྲོང་བརྡལ།	rma phra li grong brdal	632626100
Zora Town (Huashixia)	花石峡镇	Huāshíxiá Zhèn	མཛོ་རྭ་གྲོང་རྡལ།	mdzo rwa grong rdal	632626101
Townships
Maqu Township (Huanghe)	黄河乡	Huánghé Xiāng	རྨ་ཆུ་ཡུལ་ཚོ།	rma chu yul tsho	632626200
Co'gyarêng Township (Zhalinghu)	扎陵湖乡	Zhālínghú Xiāng	མཚོ་སྐྱ་རེངས་ཡུལ་ཚོ།	mtsho skya rengs yul tsho	632626201

== See also ==
- List of administrative divisions of Qinghai
