= Xiuma Township, Qinghai =

Xiuma Township 秀麻乡
- Township
- Xiumaxiang
- Location in Qinghai
- Coordinates: 35°3′18″N 100°20′17″E
- Country: People's Republic of China
- Province: Qinghai
- Autonomous prefecture: Hainan Tibetan Autonomous Prefecture
- County: Tongde County

Area
  - Total: 960.8 km^{2} (371.0 sq mi)

Population (2010)
  - Total: 7,286
  - Density: 7.583/km^{2} (19.64/sq mi)
- Time zone: UTC+8 (China Standard)
- Local dialing code: 974

Xiuma Township (Chinese: 秀麻乡) is a township under the jurisdiction of Tongde County, Hainan Tibetan Autonomous Prefecture, Qinghai, China. In 2010, Xiuma Township had a total population of 7,286: 3,710 males and 3,576 females: 2,203 aged under 14, 4,728 aged between 15 and 65 and 355 over 65 years of age.
