= Gandu, Qinghai =

Gandu 甘都镇
- Town
- Ganduzhen
- Location in Qinghai
- Coordinates: 35°53′27″N 102°19′38″E
- Country: China
- Province: Qinghai
- Prefecture-level city: Haidong
- Autonomous County: Hualong

Area
  - Total: 147.4 km^{2} (56.9 sq mi)

Population (2020)
  - Total: 25,899
  - Density: 175.7/km^{2} (455.1/sq mi)
- Time zone: UTC+8 (China Standard)
- Local dialing code: 972

Gandu (Chinese: 甘都镇) is a town in Hualong Hui Autonomous County, Haidong, Qinghai, China. In 2010, Gandu had a total population of 20,536: 10,040 males and 10,496 females: 6,629 aged under 14, 12,454 aged between 15 and 65 and 1,453 aged over 65.
