= Xibusha Township, Qinghai =

Xibusha Township 西卜沙乡
- Township
- Xibushaxiang
- Location in Qinghai
- Coordinates: 35°1′43″N 101°42′7″E
- Country: People's Republic of China
- Province: Qinghai
- Autonomous prefecture: Huangnan Tibetan Autonomous Prefecture
- County: Zêkog County

Area
  - Total: 177 km^{2} (68 sq mi)

Population (2010)
  - Total: 2,827
  - Density: 16.0/km^{2} (41.4/sq mi)
- Time zone: UTC+8 (China Standard)
- Local dialing code: 973

Xibusha Township (Chinese: 西卜沙乡) is a township in Zêkog County, Huangnan Tibetan Autonomous Prefecture, Qinghai, China. In 2010, Xibusha Township had a total population of 2,827: 1,397 males and 1,430 females. Of them 951 are aged under 14, 1,742 aged between 15 and 65 and 134 aged over 65.
