= Ningxiu Township, Qinghai =

Ningxiu Township 宁秀乡
- Township
- Ningxiuxiang
- Location in Qinghai
- Coordinates: 35°12′22″N 100°51′12″E
- Country: People's Republic of China
- Province: Qinghai
- Autonomous prefecture: Huangnan Tibetan Autonomous Prefecture
- County: Zêkog County

Area
  - Total: 1,182 km^{2} (456 sq mi)

Population (2010)
  - Total: 14,620
  - Density: 12.37/km^{2} (32.04/sq mi)
- Time zone: UTC+8 (China Standard)
- Local dialing code: 973

Ningxiu Township (Chinese: 宁秀乡) is a township under the jurisdiction of Zêkog County, Huangnan Tibetan Autonomous Prefecture, Qinghai, China. In 2010, Ningxiu Township had a total population of 14,620: 7,246 males and 7,374 females: 5,079 aged under 14, 8,869 aged between 15 and 65 and 672 aged over 65.
