= Chengzhong, Xining =

Chengzhong 城中区
- District
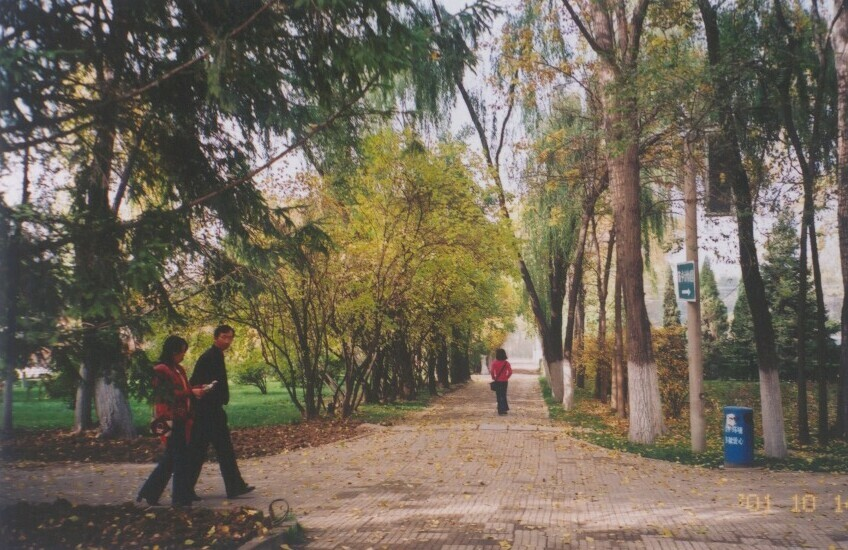
- Xining People's Park in October 2001
- Interactive map of Chengzhong
- Coordinates (Central Square / 中心广场): 36°37′23″N 101°46′28″E
- Country: China
- Province: Qinghai
- Prefecture-level city: Xining
- District seat: Yinma Street Subdistrict

Area
  - Total: 151 km^{2} (58 sq mi)

Population (2020)
  - Total: 325,813
  - Density: 2,160/km^{2} (5,590/sq mi)
- Time zone: UTC+8 (China Standard)

Chengzhong, Xining
- Simplified Chinese: 城中区
- Traditional Chinese: 城中區
- Literal meaning: "city center district"
Transcriptions
Standard Mandarin
- Hanyu Pinyin: Chéngzhōng Qū

Chengzhong (Chinese: 城中区) is one of four districts and the municipal seat of the prefecture-level city of Xining, the capital of Qinghai Province, Northwest China. It has an area of 10.5 km^{2} (4.1 sq mi) and has 150,000 inhabitants (2004).

== Administrative divisions ==
Chengzhong District is divided into 7 subdistricts and 1 town:

- Renmin Street Subdistrict (人民街街道)
- Nantan Subdistrict (南滩街道)
- Cangmen Street Subdistrict (仓门街街道)
- Lirang Street Subdistrict (礼让街街道)
- Yinma Street Subdistrict (饮马街街道)
- Nanchuan East Road Subdistrict (南川东路街道)
- Nanchuan West Road Subdistrict (南川西路街道)
- Zhongzhai Town (总寨镇)

== See also ==
- List of administrative divisions of Qinghai
