= Tajia Township, Qinghai =

Thagya Tibetan Township 塔加藏族乡 ཐ་རྒྱ་བོད་རིགས་ཞང་། Tajia
- Ethnic township
- Location in Qinghai
- Coordinates: 35°57′58″N 102°38′43″E
- Country: China
- Province: Qinghai
- Prefecture-level city: Haidong
- Autonomous County: Hualong

Area
  - Total: 159.8 km^{2} (61.7 sq mi)

Population (2020)
  - Total: 3,475
  - Density: 21.75/km^{2} (56.32/sq mi)
- Time zone: UTC+8 (China Standard)
- Postal code: 810900
- Local dialing code: 972

Thagya Tibetan Township (Tibetan: ཐ་རྒྱ་བོད་རིགས་ཞང་།, Chinese: 塔加藏族乡) or Tajia Township, is a township in Hualong Hui Autonomous County, Haidong, Qinghai, China. In 2010, Tajia Township had a total population of 3,938, made up of 1,999 males and 1,939 females: 950 people were aged under 14, 2,700 were aged between 15 and 65 and 288 were aged over 65.
