= Zêkog County =

Zêkog 泽库县 · རྩེ་ཁོག་རྫོང་།
- County
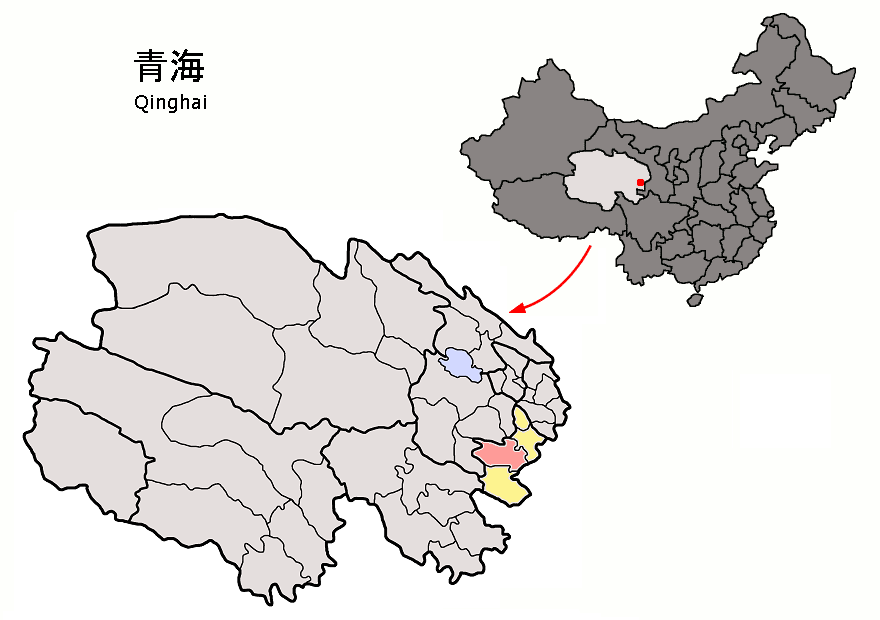
- Zêkog County (light red) within Huangnan Prefecture (yellow) and Qinghai

- Location of the seat in Qinghai
- Coordinates: 35°05′N 101°30′E
- Country: China
- Province: Qinghai
- Autonomous prefecture: Huangnan
- County seat: Chak Qu Town

Area
  - Total: 6,494 km^{2} (2,507 sq mi)
- Elevation: 3,660 m (12,010 ft)

Population (2020)
  - Total: 75,659
  - Density: 11.65/km^{2} (30.17/sq mi)
- Time zone: UTC+8 (China Standard)
- Postal code: 811400
- Area code: 0973
- Website: www.zeku.gov.cn

Zêkog County

Chinese name
- Simplified Chinese: 泽库县
- Traditional Chinese: 澤庫縣
Transcriptions
Standard Mandarin
- Hanyu Pinyin: Zékù Xiàn

Tibetan name
- Tibetan: རྩེ་ཁོག་རྫོང་།
Transcriptions
- Wylie: rtse khog rdzong
- Tibetan Pinyin: Zêkog Zong

Zêkog County (Tibetan: རྩེ་ཁོག་རྫོང, Tibetan pronunciation: [tse˥˥ kʰo˥˨], Amdo Tibetan pronunciation: [(ʂ)tse kʰok]; Chinese: 泽库县) is the second largest administrative subdivision by area within Huangnan Tibetan Autonomous Prefecture in eastern Qinghai Province, China, bordering Gansu to the east. The county has an area of 6,658 square kilometres or 2,571 square miles and a population of ~50,000 (2001), mainly Tibetan. The county seat is the town of Chak Qu, whose altitude is approximately 3,700 metres or 12,100 feet above sea level.

== Administrative divisions ==
Zêkog County is made up of 4 towns and 3 townships:

Name	Simplified Chinese	Hanyu Pinyin	Tibetan	Wylie	Administrative division code
Towns
Zêkog Town (Zêqu, Chak Qu, Zequ)	泽曲镇	Zéqǔ Zhèn	རྩེ་ཆུ་གྲོང་བརྡལ།	rtse chu grong brdal	632323100
Mêxü Town (Maixiu)	麦秀镇	Màixiù Zhèn	དམེ་ཤུལ་གྲོང་རྡལ།	dme shul grong rdal	632323101
Hor Town (Heri)	和日镇	Hérì Zhèn	ཧོར་གྲོང་རྡལ།	hor grong rdal	632323102
Nyinqug Town (Nyinxug, Ningxiu)	宁秀镇	Níngxiù Zhèn	ཉིན་ཤུག་གྲོང་རྡལ།	nyin shug grong rdal	632323103
Townships
Poingya Township (Wangjia)	王加乡	Wángjiā Xiāng	བོན་བརྒྱ་ཞང་།	rtse chu grong brdal	632323202
Jisa Township (Xibusha)	西卜沙乡	Xībùshā Xiāng	དཔྱི་ས་ཞང་།	dpyi sa zhang	632323203
Dogarmo Township (Duohemao)	多禾茂乡	Duōhémào Xiāng	རྡོ་དཀར་མོ་ཞང་།	rdo dkar mo zhang	632323204

== Climate ==
Zêkog County has an alpine climate (Köppen ETH) due to very high elevation.

Climate data for Zêkog County, elevation 3,663 m (12,018 ft), (1991–2020 normals, extremes 1981–present)
Month	Jan	Feb	Mar	Apr	May	Jun	Jul	Aug	Sep	Oct	Nov	Dec	Year
Record high °C (°F)	10.7 (51.3)	12.3 (54.1)	16.5 (61.7)	21.6 (70.9)	21.4 (70.5)	22.8 (73.0)	25.2 (77.4)	23.2 (73.8)	22.9 (73.2)	19.0 (66.2)	14.5 (58.1)	10.9 (51.6)	25.2 (77.4)
Mean daily maximum °C (°F)	−2.6 (27.3)	0.2 (32.4)	3.7 (38.7)	8.1 (46.6)	11.1 (52.0)	13.6 (56.5)	16.0 (60.8)	15.9 (60.6)	12.5 (54.5)	7.1 (44.8)	2.5 (36.5)	−1.3 (29.7)	7.2 (45.0)
Daily mean °C (°F)	−12.9 (8.8)	−9.7 (14.5)	−5.0 (23.0)	0.3 (32.5)	4.1 (39.4)	7.5 (45.5)	9.7 (49.5)	9.2 (48.6)	5.5 (41.9)	−0.2 (31.6)	−6.8 (19.8)	−11.7 (10.9)	−0.8 (30.5)
Mean daily minimum °C (°F)	−20.7 (−5.3)	−17.6 (0.3)	−12.1 (10.2)	−6.2 (20.8)	−1.7 (28.9)	2.2 (36.0)	4.2 (39.6)	3.8 (38.8)	0.8 (33.4)	−5.2 (22.6)	−13.3 (8.1)	−19.2 (−2.6)	−7.1 (19.2)
Record low °C (°F)	−35.0 (−31.0)	−31.9 (−25.4)	−28.3 (−18.9)	−19.0 (−2.2)	−17.3 (0.9)	−6.2 (20.8)	−8.7 (16.3)	−7.6 (18.3)	−10.5 (13.1)	−19.0 (−2.2)	−27.1 (−16.8)	−31.1 (−24.0)	−35.0 (−31.0)
Average precipitation mm (inches)	3.2 (0.13)	4.7 (0.19)	11.3 (0.44)	24.6 (0.97)	58.7 (2.31)	82.9 (3.26)	109.1 (4.30)	90.7 (3.57)	78.1 (3.07)	31.2 (1.23)	3.9 (0.15)	1.4 (0.06)	499.8 (19.68)
Average precipitation days (≥ 0.1 mm)	4.2	5.4	7.5	10.4	16.2	18.0	17.8	16.6	16.8	12.4	3.4	2.1	130.8
Average snowy days	5.5	7.6	9.9	13.2	12.4	2.9	0.4	0.5	4.0	13.0	5.2	3.2	77.8
Average relative humidity (%)	49	48	50	57	66	72	75	76	77	70	56	47	62
Mean monthly sunshine hours	219.2	200.3	229.6	237.4	221.0	196.0	212.3	212.8	172.7	203.4	227.2	229.4	2,561.3
Percentage possible sunshine	70	64	61	60	51	45	48	52	47	59	74	76	59
Source: China Meteorological Administration All-time Nov high

== See also ==
- List of administrative divisions of Qinghai
