= Angsiduo Township, Qinghai =

Angsiduo 昂思多镇
- Town
- Angsiduoxiang
- Location in Qinghai
- Coordinates: 36°10′11″N 102°3′53″E
- Country: China
- Province: Qinghai
- Prefecture-level city: Haidong
- Autonomous County: Hualong

Area
  - Total: 184.5 km^{2} (71.2 sq mi)

Population (2020)
  - Total: 14,709
  - Density: 79.72/km^{2} (206.5/sq mi)
- Time zone: UTC+8 (China Standard)
- Local dialing code: 972

Angsiduo (Chinese: 昂思多镇) is a town in Hualong Hui Autonomous County, Haidong, Qinghai, China. In 2010, Angsiduo had a total population of 16,739: 8,354 males and 8,385 females: 4,584 aged under 14, 11,093 aged between 15 and 65 and 1,062 aged over 65.
