= Huanghe Township, Qinghai =

Maqu Township 黄河乡 · རྨ་ཆུ་ཡུལ་ཚོ། Huanghe Township
- Township
- Location in Qinghai
- Coordinates: 34°36′2″N 98°16′7″E
- Country: China
- Province: Qinghai
- Autonomous prefecture: Golog
- County: Madoi

Area
  - Total: 4,640 km^{2} (1,790 sq mi)

Population (2010)
  - Total: 1,585
  - Density: 0.342/km^{2} (0.885/sq mi)
- Time zone: UTC+8 (China Standard)
- Local dialing code: 975

Maqu Township or Huanghe Township (Tibetan: རྨ་ཆུ་ཡུལ་ཚོ།, Chinese: 黄河乡) is a township in Madoi County, Golog Tibetan Autonomous Prefecture, Qinghai, China. In 2010, Maqu Township had a total population of 1,585: 809 males and 776 females: 432 aged under 14, 1,076 aged between 15 and 65 and 77 aged over 65.
