= Wangjia Township, Qinghai =

Wangjia Township 王家乡
- Township
- Wangjiaxiang
- Location in Qinghai
- Coordinates: 35°23′22″N 100°57′17″E
- Country: People's Republic of China
- Province: Qinghai
- Autonomous prefecture: Huangnan Tibetan Autonomous Prefecture
- County: Zêkog County

Area
  - Total: 567.4 km^{2} (219.1 sq mi)

Population (2010)
  - Total: 4,371
  - Density: 7.704/km^{2} (19.95/sq mi)
- Time zone: UTC+8 (China Standard)
- Local dialing code: 973

Wangjia Township (Chinese: 王家乡) is a township in Zêkog County, Huangnan Tibetan Autonomous Prefecture, Qinghai, China. In 2010, Wangjia Township had a total population of 4,371: 2,186 males and 2,185 females: 1,399 aged under 14, 2,740 aged between 15 and 65 and 232 aged over 65.
