= Zhaba, Qinghai =

Zhaba 扎巴镇
- Town
- Zhabazhen
- Location in Qinghai
- Coordinates: 36°12′24″N 101°59′31″E
- Country: China
- Province: Qinghai
- Prefecture-level city: Haidong
- Autonomous County: Hualong

Area
  - Total: 180.4 km^{2} (69.7 sq mi)

Population (2020)
  - Total: 18,156
  - Density: 100.6/km^{2} (260.7/sq mi)
- Time zone: UTC+8 (China Standard)
- Local dialing code: 972

Zhaba (Chinese: 扎巴镇) is a town in Hualong Hui Autonomous County, Haidong, Qinghai, China. In 2010, Zhaba had a total population of 19,032: 9,595 males and 9,437 females: 5,675 aged under 14, 12,385 aged between 15 and 65 and 972 aged over 65.
