= Renmin Street Subdistrict, Xining =

Renmin Street Subdistrict 人民街街道
- Subdistrict
- Location in Qinghai
- Coordinates: 36°37′11″N 101°46′44″E
- Country: China
- Province: Qinghai
- Prefecture-level city: Xining
- District: Chengzhong District

Area
  - Total: 1.4 km^{2} (0.54 sq mi)

Population (2011)
  - Total: 17,492
  - Density: 12,000/km^{2} (32,000/sq mi)
- Time zone: UTC+8 (China Standard Time)

Renmin Street Subdistrict (Chinese: 人民街街道; pinyin: Rénmínjiē Jiēdào) is a subdistrict situated in Chengzhong District, Xining, Qinghai, China. As of 2020, it administers the following two residential neighborhoods:

- Nanguan Street Community (南关街社区)
- Shuijingxiang Community (水井巷社区)

== See also ==
- List of township-level divisions of Qinghai
