= Maixiu =

Town in Qinghai, China

Maixiu 麦秀镇
- Town
- Maixiuzhen
- Location in Qinghai
- Coordinates: 35°12′0″N 101°47′16″E
- Country: People's Republic of China
- Province: Qinghai
- Autonomous prefecture: Huangnan Tibetan Autonomous Prefecture
- County: Zêkog County

Area
  - Total: 1,420 km^{2} (550 sq mi)

Population (2010)
  - Total: 11,139
  - Density: 7.84/km^{2} (20.3/sq mi)
- Time zone: UTC+8 (China Standard)
- Local dialing code: 973

Maixiu (Chinese: 麦秀镇) is a town in Zêkog County, Huangnan Tibetan Autonomous Prefecture, Qinghai, China. In 2010, Maixiu had a total population of 11,139: 5,530 males and 5,609 females: 3,576 aged under 14, 6,918 aged between 15 and 65 and 645 aged over 65.
