= Jigzhi County =

Jigzhi County 久治县 · གཅིག་སྒྲིལ་རྫོང་། Jiuzhi, Chik Dril
- County
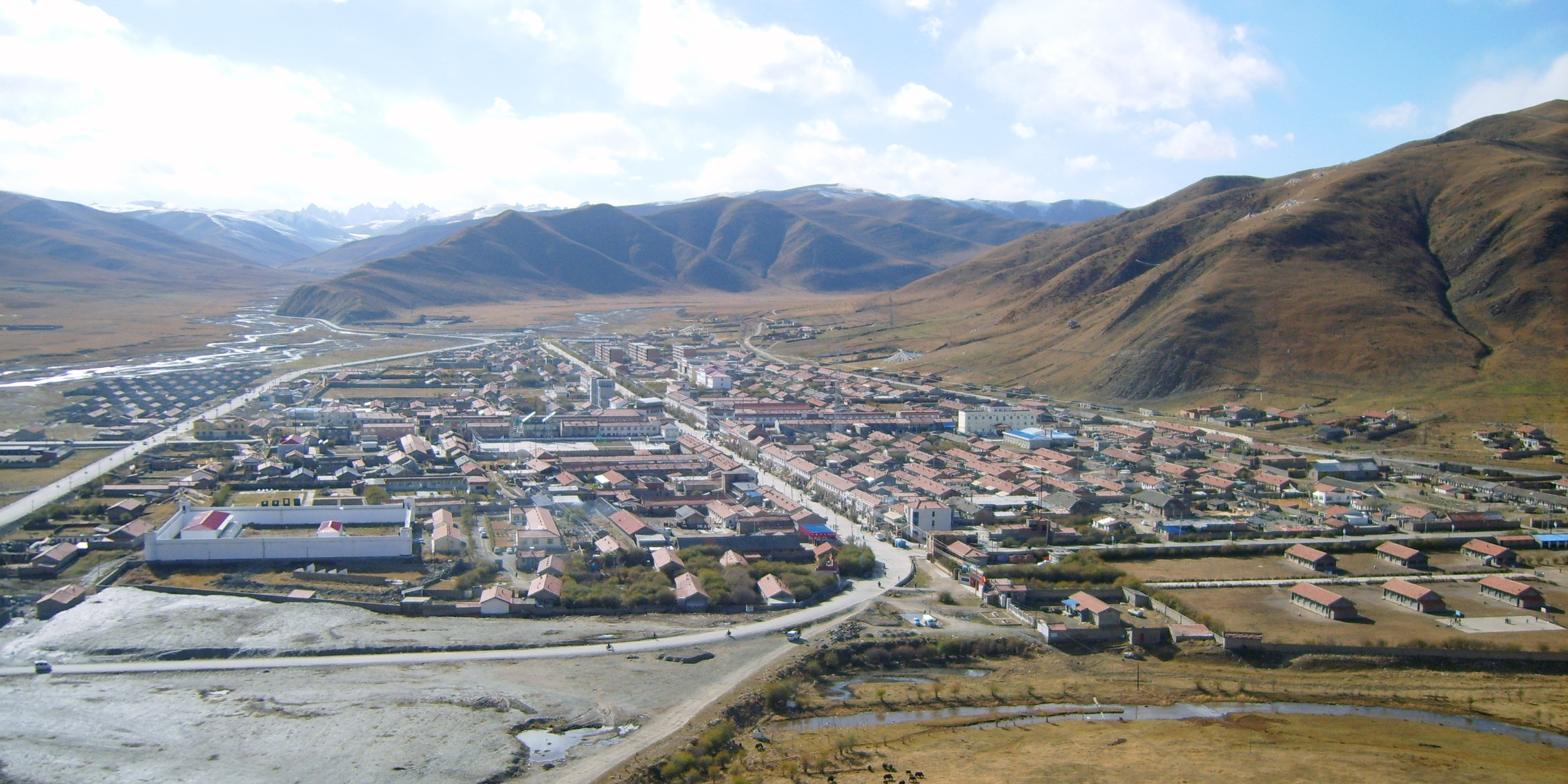

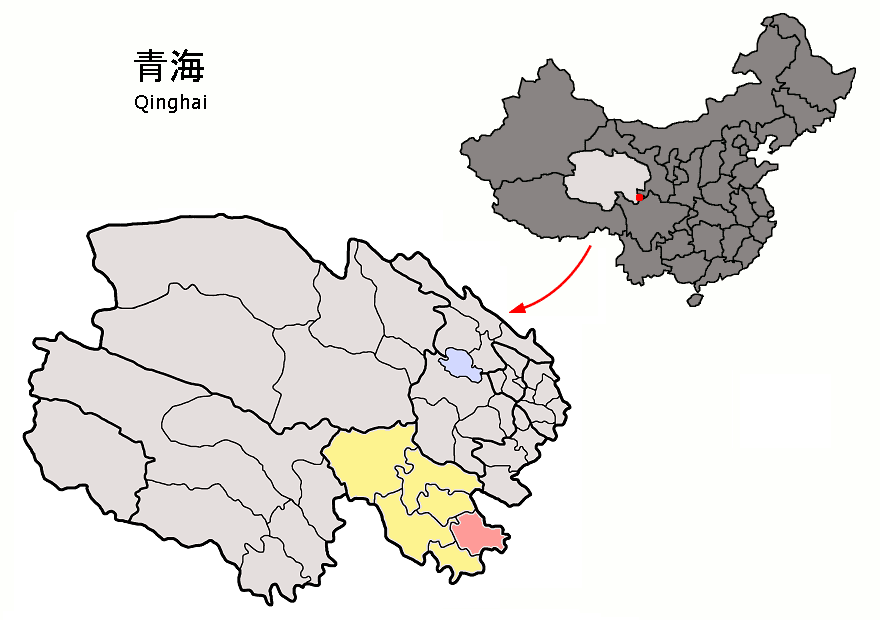
- Jigzhi County (light red) within Golog Prefecture (yellow) and Qinghai

- Location in Qinghai
- Coordinates: 33°32′N 100°55′E
- Country: China
- Province: Qinghai
- Autonomous prefecture: Golog
- County seat: Chugqênsumdo

Area
  - Total: 8,757.25 km^{2} (3,381.19 sq mi)

Population (2020)
  - Total: 29,929
  - Density: 3.4176/km^{2} (8.8516/sq mi)
- Time zone: UTC+8 (China Standard)
- Website: www.jiuzhixian.gov.cn

Jigzhi County

Chinese name
- Simplified Chinese: 久治县
- Traditional Chinese: 久治縣
Transcriptions
Standard Mandarin
- Hanyu Pinyin: Jiǔzhì Xiàn
Yue: Cantonese
- Jyutping: gau^{2}zi^{6} jyun^{2}

Tibetan name
- Tibetan: གཅིག་སྒྲིལ་རྫོང་།
Transcriptions
- Wylie: gcig sgril rdzong
- Tibetan Pinyin: Jigzhi Zong

Jigzhi County or Chik Dril (Tibetan: གཅིག་སྒྲིལ་རྫོང་།; Chinese: 久治县) is a county of Qinghai Province, China, bordering Sichuan to the southeast and Gansu to the northeast. It is under the administration of Golog Tibetan Autonomous Prefecture. The seat of Jigzhi County is in the Town of Chugqênsumdo.

== Administrative divisions ==
Jigzhi is divided into one town and five townships:

| Name | Simplified Chinese | Hanyu Pinyin | Tibetan | Wylie | Administrative division code |
|---|---|---|---|---|---|
Town
| Chugqênsumdo Town (Zhogqênsumdo, Zhiqingsongduo) | 智青松多镇 | Zhìqīngsōngduō Zhèn | དྲུག་ཆེན་སུམ་མདོ་གྲོང་རྡལ། | drug chen sum mdo grong rdal | 632625100 |
Townships
| Mintang Township (Mentang) | 门堂乡 | Méntáng Xiāng | སྨིན་ཐང་ཡུལ་ཚོ། | smin thang yul tsho | 632625200 |
| Basar Township (Wasai) | 哇赛乡 | Wāsài Xiāng | སྦྲ་གསར་ཡུལ་ཚོ། | sbra gsar yul tsho | 632625201 |
| Sogru Township (Sogruma, Suohurima) | 索呼日麻乡 | Suǒhūrìmá Xiāng | སོག་རུ་ཡུལ་ཚོ། | sog ru yul tsho | 632625202 |
| Baiyü Township (Baiyu) | 白玉乡 | Báiyù Xiāng | དཔལ་ཡུལ་ཡུལ་ཚོ། | dpal yul yul tsho | 632625203 |
| Parxi Township (Wa'eryi) | 哇尔依乡 | Wā'ěryī Xiāng | བར་བཞི་ཡུལ་ཚོ། | bar bzhi yul tsho | 632625204 |

== Climate ==
Jigzhi County has a dry-winter subarctic climate (Dwc)

Climate data for Jigzhi, elevation 3,629 m (11,906 ft), (1991–2020 normals, extremes 1981–2010)
| Month | Jan | Feb | Mar | Apr | May | Jun | Jul | Aug | Sep | Oct | Nov | Dec | Year |
|---|---|---|---|---|---|---|---|---|---|---|---|---|---|
| Record high °C (°F) | 14.2 (57.6) | 14.8 (58.6) | 18.4 (65.1) | 22.1 (71.8) | 23.0 (73.4) | 25.3 (77.5) | 24.4 (75.9) | 24.9 (76.8) | 24.6 (76.3) | 21.9 (71.4) | 15.0 (59.0) | 13.2 (55.8) | 25.3 (77.5) |
| Mean daily maximum °C (°F) | 1.6 (34.9) | 3.5 (38.3) | 6.3 (43.3) | 10.0 (50.0) | 13.0 (55.4) | 15.1 (59.2) | 17.5 (63.5) | 17.6 (63.7) | 14.9 (58.8) | 10.1 (50.2) | 6.0 (42.8) | 2.7 (36.9) | 9.9 (49.8) |
| Daily mean °C (°F) | −9.2 (15.4) | −6.4 (20.5) | −2.2 (28.0) | 2.2 (36.0) | 5.7 (42.3) | 8.9 (48.0) | 10.9 (51.6) | 10.4 (50.7) | 7.6 (45.7) | 2.3 (36.1) | −3.6 (25.5) | −8.1 (17.4) | 1.5 (34.8) |
| Mean daily minimum °C (°F) | −17.9 (−0.2) | −14.6 (5.7) | −8.9 (16.0) | −3.8 (25.2) | 0.1 (32.2) | 4.0 (39.2) | 5.7 (42.3) | 5.1 (41.2) | 2.7 (36.9) | −2.8 (27.0) | −10.2 (13.6) | −16.1 (3.0) | −4.7 (23.5) |
| Record low °C (°F) | −32.0 (−25.6) | −27.8 (−18.0) | −25.5 (−13.9) | −18.9 (−2.0) | −10.3 (13.5) | −4.2 (24.4) | −3.4 (25.9) | −4.3 (24.3) | −7.1 (19.2) | −17.1 (1.2) | −27.1 (−16.8) | −29.3 (−20.7) | −32.0 (−25.6) |
| Average precipitation mm (inches) | 7.2 (0.28) | 9.7 (0.38) | 24.6 (0.97) | 42.2 (1.66) | 94.2 (3.71) | 135.6 (5.34) | 129.3 (5.09) | 120.9 (4.76) | 108.2 (4.26) | 58.3 (2.30) | 8.7 (0.34) | 3.2 (0.13) | 742.1 (29.22) |
| Average precipitation days (≥ 0.1 mm) | 6.0 | 7.9 | 12.8 | 14.5 | 21.5 | 23.7 | 21.3 | 19.9 | 21.0 | 16.7 | 5.8 | 3.5 | 174.6 |
| Average snowy days | 8.4 | 10.4 | 15.9 | 17.0 | 12.2 | 1.7 | 0.4 | 0.4 | 3.0 | 15.0 | 7.6 | 5.5 | 97.5 |
| Average relative humidity (%) | 52 | 53 | 58 | 63 | 69 | 73 | 74 | 75 | 76 | 71 | 60 | 53 | 65 |
| Mean monthly sunshine hours | 212.4 | 189.1 | 211.0 | 216.4 | 195.6 | 158.2 | 182.2 | 187.6 | 157.3 | 180.0 | 215.8 | 222.3 | 2,327.9 |
| Percentage possible sunshine | 67 | 61 | 56 | 55 | 45 | 37 | 42 | 46 | 43 | 52 | 70 | 72 | 54 |
Source: China Meteorological Administration

== See also ==
- List of administrative divisions of Qinghai
