= Tongde County =

Tongde County 同德县 · འབལ་རྫོང་།
- County
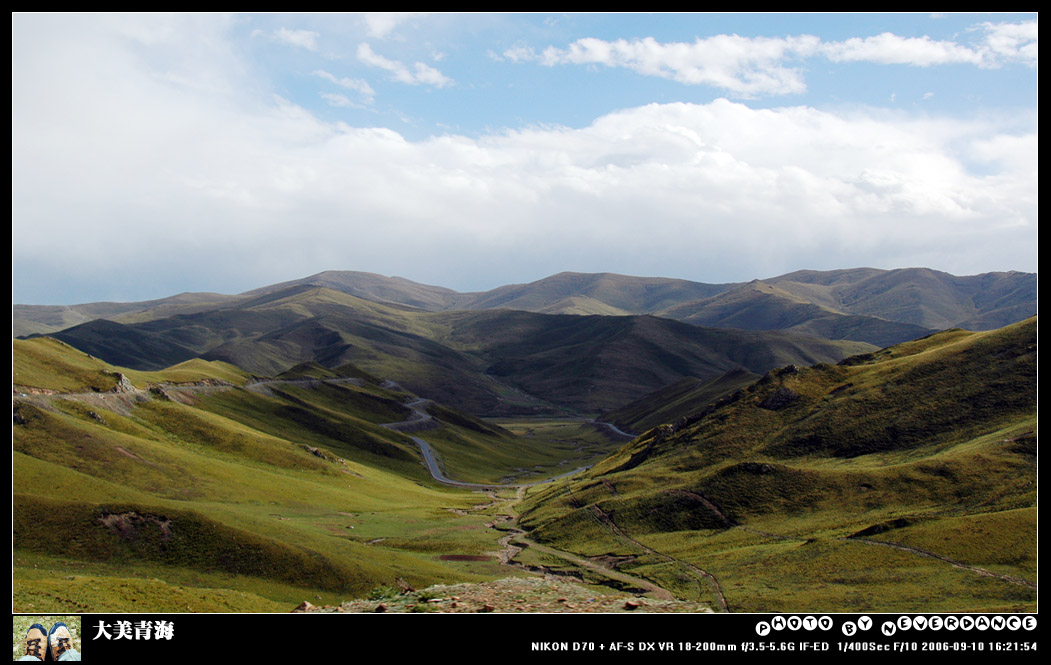

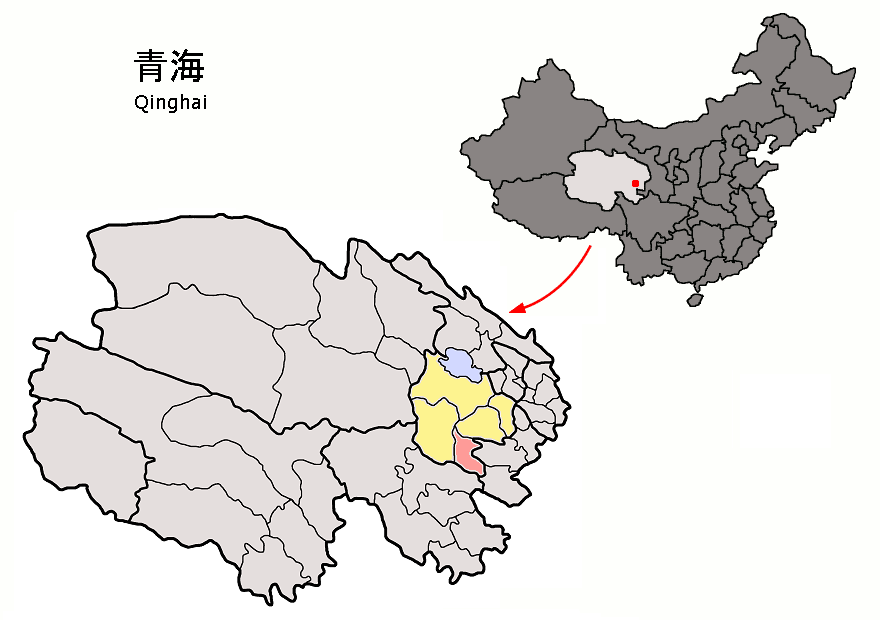
- Tongde County (light red) within Hainan Prefecture (yellow) and Qinghai

- Location in Qinghai
- Coordinates: 35°00′N 100°30′E
- Country: China
- Province: Qinghai
- Autonomous prefecture: Hainan
- County seat: Gabasumdo

Area
  - Total: 4,758 km^{2} (1,837 sq mi)

Population (2020)
  - Total: 60,268
  - Density: 12.67/km^{2} (32.81/sq mi)
- Time zone: UTC+8 (China Standard)
- Website: www.tongde.gov.cn

Tongde County

Chinese name
- Simplified Chinese: 同德县
- Traditional Chinese: 同德縣
Transcriptions
Standard Mandarin
- Hanyu Pinyin: Tóngdé Xiàn

Tibetan name
- Tibetan: ཐུན་ཏེ་རྫོང་། or འབལ་རྫོང་།
Transcriptions
- Wylie: thun te rdzong or ʼbal rdzong
- Tibetan Pinyin: Tündê Zong or Bai Zong

Tongde County (Chinese: 同德县, Tibetan: འབལ་རྫོང་།) is a county of Qinghai province, China. It is under the administration of Hainan Tibetan Autonomous Prefecture.

== Administrative divisions ==
Tongde County is made up of 2 towns and 3 townships:

Name	Simplified Chinese	Hanyu Pinyin	Tibetan	Wylie	Administrative division code
Towns
Gabasumdo Town (Gabasongduo)	尕巴松多镇	Gǎbāsōngduō Zhèn	རྐ་འབའ་སུམ་མདོ་གྲོང་རྡལ།	rka ʼbaʼ sum mdo grong rdal	632522100
Tanggo Town (Tanggu)	唐谷镇	Tánggǔ Zhèn	ཐང་མགོ་གྲོང་བརྡལ།	thang mgo grong brdal	632522101
Townships
Balung Township (Bagou)	巴沟乡	Bāgōu Xiāng	འབའ་ལུང་ཞང་།	ʼbaʼ lung zhang	632522200
Xoima Township (Xiuma)	秀麻乡	Xiùmá Xiāng	ཞོལ་མ་ཞང་།	zhol ma zhang	632522201
Maqang Township (Hebei)	河北乡	Héběi Xiāng	རྨ་བྱང་ཞང་།	rma byang zhang	632522202

- Other: Provincial Grass Seed Breeding Farm (省牧草良种繁殖场)

== Geography and climate ==
Tongde County has an alpine subarctic climate (Köppen Dwc), with long, very cold and dry winters, and short, rainy, mild summers. Average low temperatures are below freezing from mid/late September to mid May; however, due to the wide diurnal temperature variation (at an average 16.9 °C or 30.4 °F), only January has an average high that is below freezing. Despite frequent rain during summer, when a majority of days sees rain, no month has less than 50% of possible sunshine; with monthly percent possible sunshine ranging from 51% in June to 81% in November, the county seat receives 2,806 hours of bright sunshine annually. The monthly 24-hour average temperature ranges from −13.0 °C (8.6 °F) in January to 11.7 °C (53.1 °F) in July, while the annual mean is 0.57 °C (33.0 °F). Over 70% of the annual precipitation of 426 mm (16.8 in) is delivered from June to September.

Climate data for Tongde County, elevation 3,148 m (10,328 ft), (1991–2020 normals, extremes 1971–2010)
Month	Jan	Feb	Mar	Apr	May	Jun	Jul	Aug	Sep	Oct	Nov	Dec	Year
Record high °C (°F)	12.7 (54.9)	13.1 (55.6)	18.9 (66.0)	25.5 (77.9)	25.4 (77.7)	26.6 (79.9)	29.8 (85.6)	28.0 (82.4)	26.4 (79.5)	21.7 (71.1)	14.5 (58.1)	10.2 (50.4)	29.8 (85.6)
Mean daily maximum °C (°F)	1.9 (35.4)	5.2 (41.4)	9.3 (48.7)	13.8 (56.8)	16.2 (61.2)	18.6 (65.5)	21.2 (70.2)	21.4 (70.5)	17.6 (63.7)	12.5 (54.5)	7.4 (45.3)	2.9 (37.2)	12.3 (54.2)
Daily mean °C (°F)	−8.4 (16.9)	−4.6 (23.7)	0.1 (32.2)	5.2 (41.4)	8.7 (47.7)	12.0 (53.6)	14.2 (57.6)	13.7 (56.7)	9.9 (49.8)	3.9 (39.0)	−2.7 (27.1)	−7.7 (18.1)	3.7 (38.7)
Mean daily minimum °C (°F)	−16.1 (3.0)	−12.5 (9.5)	−7.3 (18.9)	−2.0 (28.4)	2.4 (36.3)	6.5 (43.7)	8.6 (47.5)	8.0 (46.4)	4.8 (40.6)	−2.0 (28.4)	−9.6 (14.7)	−15.3 (4.5)	−2.9 (26.8)
Record low °C (°F)	−37.2 (−35.0)	−30.7 (−23.3)	−27.0 (−16.6)	−18.3 (−0.9)	−10.3 (13.5)	−5.0 (23.0)	−2.5 (27.5)	−6.8 (19.8)	−9.6 (14.7)	−18.6 (−1.5)	−28.0 (−18.4)	−30.6 (−23.1)	−37.2 (−35.0)
Average precipitation mm (inches)	2.2 (0.09)	4.0 (0.16)	8.2 (0.32)	26.7 (1.05)	68.6 (2.70)	81.2 (3.20)	96.1 (3.78)	95.7 (3.77)	74.8 (2.94)	23.1 (0.91)	4.3 (0.17)	1.2 (0.05)	486.1 (19.14)
Average precipitation days (≥ 0.1 mm)	2.5	3.3	4.5	7.5	15.4	18.2	18.1	16.2	17.0	8.8	2.3	1.2	115
Average snowy days	2.8	3.9	5.4	5.3	2.4	0.1	0.1	0	0.2	3.2	2.8	1.5	27.7
Average relative humidity (%)	34	34	35	44	55	63	66	66	67	58	45	35	50
Mean monthly sunshine hours	220.8	202.2	239.5	240.2	225.7	198.4	213.5	218.1	191.5	218.9	225.4	227.6	2,621.8
Percentage possible sunshine	70	65	64	61	52	46	49	53	52	64	74	75	60
Source: China Meteorological Administration

== See also ==
- List of administrative divisions of Qinghai
