= Chugqênsumdo =

Chugqênsumdo དྲུག་ཆེན་སུམ་མདོ Zhiqingsongduo, Kangsar, Kangsai
- Town
- 智青松多镇 · དྲུག་ཆེན་སུམ་མདོ་གྲོང་རྡལ།
- Location of the city centre in Qinghai
- Coordinates: 33°26′N 101°29′E
- Country: China
- Province: Qinghai
- Autonomous prefecture: Golog
- County: Jigzhi

Area
  - Total: 1,856.11 km^{2} (716.65 sq mi)
- Elevation: 3,630 m (11,910 ft)

Population (2011)
  - Total: 4,215
  - Density: 2.271/km^{2} (5.882/sq mi)
- Time zone: UTC+8 (China Standard)

Chugqênsumdo (Tibetan: དྲུག་ཆེན་སུམ་མདོ་, Wylie: drug chen sum mdo; Chinese: 智青松多; pinyin: Zhìqīngsōngduō) is a town in Jigzhi County, Golog Tibetan Autonomous Prefecture, Qinghai, China. The seat of Jigzhi County is located in Chugqênsumdo. Chugqênsumdo has an altitude of 3630 meters.

Originally known as Kangsar Township (ཁང་གསར) or ་Kangsai Township (康赛乡), Chugqênsumdo Town was renamed in 2001. In 2016, Chugqênsumdo had a population of approximately 4000. Chugqênsumdo is accessible through National Highway 345 and Provincial Highway 101.
