= Huashixia =

Zora 花石峡镇 · མཛོ་རྭ་གྲོང་རྡལ། Huashixia
- Town
- Location in Qinghai
- Coordinates: 35°6′6″N 98°51′39″E
- Country: China
- Province: Qinghai
- Autonomous prefecture: Golog
- County: Madoi

Area
  - Total: 8,289 km^{2} (3,200 sq mi)

Population (2010)
  - Total: 4,190
  - Density: 0.505/km^{2} (1.31/sq mi)
- Time zone: UTC+8 (China Standard)
- Local dialing code: 975

Zora or Huashixia (Tibetan: མཛོ་རྭ་གྲོང་རྡལ།, Chinese: 花石峡镇) is a town in Madoi County, Golog Tibetan Autonomous Prefecture, Qinghai, China. In 2010, Zora had a total population of 4,190 people: 2,123 males and 2,067 females: 1,165 under 14 years old, 2,849 aged between 15 and 64 and 176 over 65 years old.
