= Gabasongduo =

Gabasongduo 尕巴松多镇
- Town
- Gabasongduozhen
- Location in Qinghai
- Coordinates: 35°14′53″N 100°35′25″E
- Country: People's Republic of China
- Province: Qinghai
- Autonomous prefecture: Hainan Tibetan Autonomous Prefecture
- County: Tongde County

Area
  - Total: 1,057 km^{2} (408 sq mi)

Population (2010)
  - Total: 27,742
  - Density: 26.25/km^{2} (67.98/sq mi)
- Time zone: UTC+8 (China Standard)
- Local dialing code: 974

Gabasongduo (Chinese: 尕巴松多镇) is a town under the jurisdiction of Tongde County, Hainan Tibetan Autonomous Prefecture, Qinghai, China. In 2010, Gabasongduo had a total population of 27,742: 14,401 males and 13,341 females: 7,573 under 14 years old, 18,976 between the age of 15 and 65 and 1,193 over 65.
