= Tanggu, Qinghai =

Tanggu 唐谷镇
- Town
- Tangguzhen
- Location in Qinghai
- Coordinates: 35°10′54″N 100°29′57″E
- Country: People's Republic of China
- Province: Qinghai
- Autonomous prefecture: Hainan Tibetan Autonomous Prefecture
- County: Tongde County

Area
  - Total: 1,031 km^{2} (398 sq mi)

Population (2010)
  - Total: 11,259
  - Density: 10.92/km^{2} (28.28/sq mi)
- Time zone: UTC+8 (China Standard)
- Local dialing code: 974

Tanggu (Chinese: 唐谷镇) is a town under the jurisdiction of Tongde County, Hainan Tibetan Autonomous Prefecture, Qinghai, China. In 2010, Tanggu had a total population of 11,259: 5,710 males and 5,549 females: 3,319 under 14 years old, 7,364 aged between 15 and 65 and 576 aged over 65.
