= Haidong =

Haidong 海东市
- Prefecture-level city
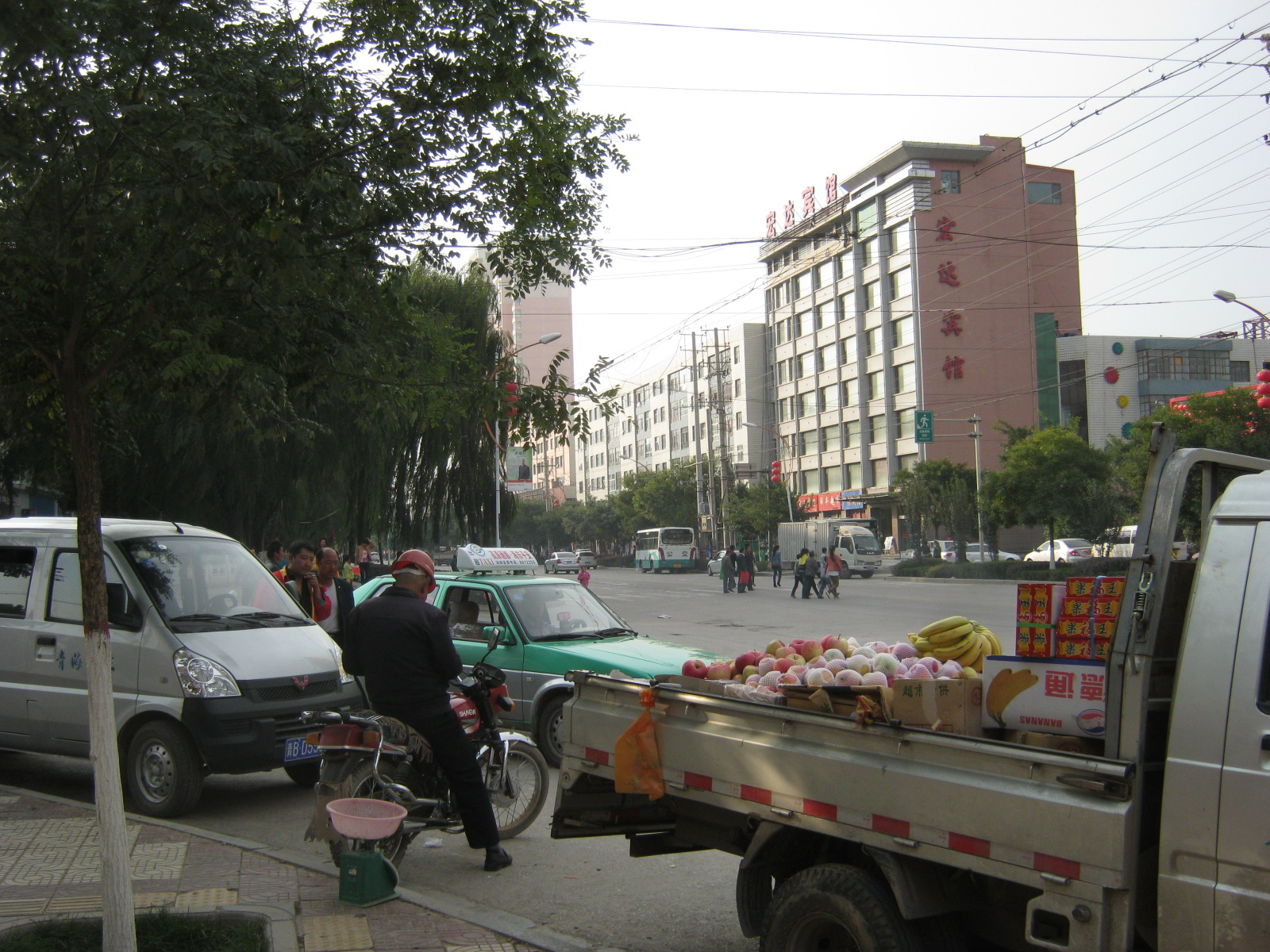
- A street in Ping'an District

- Location of Haidong Prefecture in Qinghai
- Coordinates (Haidong CCP Committee, Ping'an District): 36°30′06″N 102°06′21″E
- Country: China
- Province: Qinghai
- Municipal seat: Ledu District

Area
  - Prefecture-level city: 13,200 km^{2} (5,100 sq mi)

Population (2019)
  - Prefecture-level city: 1,726,100
  - Density: 131/km^{2} (339/sq mi)
  - Urban: 611,800

GDP
  - Prefecture-level city: CN¥ 38.4 billion US$ 6.7 billion
  - Per capita: CN¥ 26,531; US$4,260
- Time zone: UTC+8 (China Standard)
- ISO 3166 code: CN-QH-02
- Website: www.haidong.gov.cn (in Chinese)

Haidong

Chinese name
- Simplified Chinese: 海东市
- Traditional Chinese: 海東市
Transcriptions
Standard Mandarin
- Hanyu Pinyin: Hǎidōng shì

Tibetan name
- Tibetan: མཚོ་ཤར་གྲོང་ཁྱེར།
Transcriptions
- Wylie: mtsho shar grong khyer

Haidong (Chinese: 海东市; pinyin: Hǎidōng shì) is a prefecture-level city of Qinghai province in Western China. Its name literally means "east of the (Qinghai) Lake." On 8 February 2013 Haidong was upgraded from a prefecture (海东地区) into a prefecture-level city. Haidong is the third most populous administrative division in Qinghai after Xining and Golmud.

Haidong was historically populated by the Qiang people, although the area has been inhabited as early as 6000 years ago. In 121 BC the area was captured by Huo Qubing, defeating the Xiongnu. In 399 AD the Xianbei founded the state of Nanliang, with its capital in Ledu District.

== Geography ==
Haidong is the easternmost division of Qinghai province. It is bounded by Xining, the provincial capital, to the West, the Datong River Valley to the north, Gansu to the east, and the Yellow River to the south. Mountain ranges tower above the district of which the main valley is that of the Huang Shui (Tib. Tsong Chu), a major tributary of the Yellow River. This valley stretches from west to east and makes up - together with the area around Xining, the landscape which is called Tsongkha ("Onion Valley") by Tibetans. It has a total area of 13,100 square kilometres (5,100 sq mi).

== Climate ==
Haidong has a cool semi-arid climate (Köppen BSk) characterised by warm to very warm summers, freezing but extremely dry winters, and large diurnal temperature ranges. Temperatures are warmer than anywhere else in Qinghai due to the relatively low altitude, although minima in winter still typically fall below −10 °C or 14 °F. Precipitation is low and mostly confined to the summer months: less than 45 millimetres or 1.8 inches of water equivalent typically falls between October and April inclusive, and less than 12 millimetres or 0.5 inches between November and March.

Climate data for Haidong (Ping'an District), elevation 2,125 m (6,972 ft), (1991–2020 normals, extremes 1981–2010)
Month	Jan	Feb	Mar	Apr	May	Jun	Jul	Aug	Sep	Oct	Nov	Dec	Year
Record high °C (°F)	14.5 (58.1)	22.4 (72.3)	27.6 (81.7)	30.1 (86.2)	30.5 (86.9)	32.2 (90.0)	37.6 (99.7)	35.1 (95.2)	29.3 (84.7)	24.7 (76.5)	20.5 (68.9)	13.8 (56.8)	37.6 (99.7)
Mean daily maximum °C (°F)	2.4 (36.3)	6.3 (43.3)	11.6 (52.9)	17.6 (63.7)	21.2 (70.2)	24.4 (75.9)	26.2 (79.2)	25.2 (77.4)	20.3 (68.5)	15.2 (59.4)	9.4 (48.9)	3.9 (39.0)	15.3 (59.6)
Daily mean °C (°F)	−6.1 (21.0)	−2.1 (28.2)	3.6 (38.5)	9.6 (49.3)	13.6 (56.5)	17.1 (62.8)	19.0 (66.2)	18.1 (64.6)	13.6 (56.5)	7.7 (45.9)	1.1 (34.0)	−4.7 (23.5)	7.5 (45.6)
Mean daily minimum °C (°F)	−12.1 (10.2)	−8.4 (16.9)	−2.5 (27.5)	3.1 (37.6)	7.3 (45.1)	11.1 (52.0)	13.3 (55.9)	12.9 (55.2)	9.0 (48.2)	2.6 (36.7)	−4.6 (23.7)	−10.6 (12.9)	1.8 (35.2)
Record low °C (°F)	−21.9 (−7.4)	−18.9 (−2.0)	−14.6 (5.7)	−7.9 (17.8)	−1.2 (29.8)	3.9 (39.0)	6.5 (43.7)	5.9 (42.6)	0.1 (32.2)	−7.5 (18.5)	−15.6 (3.9)	−21.1 (−6.0)	−21.9 (−7.4)
Average precipitation mm (inches)	1.1 (0.04)	1.3 (0.05)	5.2 (0.20)	15.1 (0.59)	42.9 (1.69)	52.4 (2.06)	72.8 (2.87)	68.3 (2.69)	53.6 (2.11)	20.6 (0.81)	2.9 (0.11)	0.7 (0.03)	336.9 (13.25)
Average precipitation days (≥ 0.1 mm)	2.1	2.3	3.8	5.5	10.2	13.1	13.5	12.4	12.4	7.2	2.5	1.6	86.6
Average snowy days	4.0	4.6	5.4	2.3	0.3	0	0	0	0.1	1.2	3.9	3.0	24.8
Average relative humidity (%)	45	43	42	42	50	56	61	63	67	62	52	48	53
Mean monthly sunshine hours	202.4	208.5	236.1	245.7	252.1	234.4	240.4	231.4	192.8	209.2	207.2	202.1	2,662.3
Percentage possible sunshine	65	67	63	62	58	54	54	56	53	61	68	68	61
Source: China Meteorological Administration

Climate data for Haidong (Ledu District), elevation 2,021 m (6,631 ft), (1991–2020 normals)
Month	Jan	Feb	Mar	Apr	May	Jun	Jul	Aug	Sep	Oct	Nov	Dec	Year
Mean daily maximum °C (°F)	2.7 (36.9)	6.6 (43.9)	12.2 (54.0)	18.3 (64.9)	22.0 (71.6)	25.3 (77.5)	27.1 (80.8)	25.9 (78.6)	21.0 (69.8)	15.9 (60.6)	9.9 (49.8)	4.0 (39.2)	15.9 (60.6)
Daily mean °C (°F)	−5.5 (22.1)	−1.4 (29.5)	4.4 (39.9)	10.4 (50.7)	14.4 (57.9)	18.0 (64.4)	19.9 (67.8)	18.9 (66.0)	14.4 (57.9)	8.4 (47.1)	1.8 (35.2)	−4.1 (24.6)	8.3 (46.9)
Mean daily minimum °C (°F)	−11.6 (11.1)	−7.8 (18.0)	−1.8 (28.8)	3.6 (38.5)	7.9 (46.2)	11.8 (53.2)	14.1 (57.4)	13.7 (56.7)	9.6 (49.3)	3.1 (37.6)	−3.8 (25.2)	−9.9 (14.2)	2.4 (36.4)
Average precipitation mm (inches)	1.2 (0.05)	1.8 (0.07)	7.1 (0.28)	15.0 (0.59)	42.3 (1.67)	50.3 (1.98)	69.5 (2.74)	71.2 (2.80)	52.1 (2.05)	20.7 (0.81)	2.9 (0.11)	0.8 (0.03)	334.9 (13.18)
Average precipitation days (≥ 0.1 mm)	2.4	2.9	4.8	5.7	9.8	13.0	13.2	12.3	12.6	7.0	2.6	1.8	88.1
Average snowy days	4.1	5.0	5.7	1.9	0.2	0	0	0	0	1.1	3.8	3.2	25
Average relative humidity (%)	47	45	44	44	52	57	61	64	69	64	55	51	54
Mean monthly sunshine hours	190.5	194.9	225.8	236.8	242.7	228.7	231.7	221.3	185.6	195.3	195.7	194.2	2,543.2
Percentage possible sunshine	61	63	60	60	55	52	52	54	51	57	65	65	58
Source: China Meteorological Administration

== Administrative divisions ==
Map
Name	Simplified Chinese	Hanyu Pinyin	Population (2010 Census)	Area (km^{2})	Density (/km^{2})
Ping'an District	平安区	Píng'ān Qū	102,975	750	137
Ledu District	乐都区	Lèdū Qū	260,185	2,821	92
Minhe Hui and Tu Autonomous County	民和回族土族自治县	Mínhé Huízú Tǔzú; Zìzhìxiàn	350,118	1,780	197
Huzhu Tu Autonomous County	互助土族自治县	Hùzhù Tǔzú; Zìzhìxiàn	356,437	3,321	107
Hualong Hui Autonomous County	化隆回族自治县	Huàlóng Huízú; Zìzhìxiàn	203,317	2,740	74
Xunhua Salar Autonomous County	循化撒拉族自治县	Xúnhuà Sǎlāzú; Zìzhìxiàn	123,814	1,749	70

== Demographics ==
As of 2005, the total population of Haidong is approximately 1,480,000. It is the most densely populated area of Qinghai, with almost a third of the province's population (its surface makes up only two percent of Qinghai).
