= Township (China) =

formally Township-level divisions

Chinese name
- Simplified Chinese: 乡级行政区
- Traditional Chinese: 鄉級行政區
Transcriptions
Standard Mandarin
- Hanyu Pinyin: Xiāng Jí Xíngzhèngqū

Alternative Chinese name
- Simplified Chinese: 乡
- Traditional Chinese: 鄉
Transcriptions
Standard Mandarin
- Hanyu Pinyin: Xiāng

Tibetan name
- Tibetan: ཤང་།
Transcriptions
- Wylie: shang
- Tibetan Pinyin: Xang

Zhuang name
- Zhuang: Yangh

Korean name
- Hangul: 향
Transcriptions
- Revised Romanization: hyang
- McCune–Reischauer: hyang

Mongolian name
- Mongolian Cyrillic: шиян
- Mongolian script: ᠰᠢᠶᠠᠩ
Transcriptions
- SASM/GNC: šiyaŋ

Uyghur name
- Uyghur: يېزا
Transcriptions
- Latin Yëziqi: Yéza

Manchu name
- Manchu script: ᡤᠠᡧᠠᠨ
- Möllendorff: gašan

Kazakh name
- Kazakh: اۋىل ауыл auyl

Kyrgyz name
- Kyrgyz: ايىل айыл ajyl

Daur name
- Daur: tors

Oroqen name
- Oroqen: ajiil

Townships (乡), formally township-level divisions (乡级行政区), are the basic level (fourth-level administrative units) of political divisions in the People's Republic of China. They are similar to municipalities and communes in other countries and in turn may contain village committees and villages. In 1995 there were 29,648 townships and 17,570 towns (a total of 47,218 township-level divisions) in China which included the territories held by the Republic of China and claimed by the PRC.

Much like other levels of government in mainland China, the township's governance is divided between the Communist Party Township Secretary, and the "county magistrate" (Chinese: 乡长; pinyin: xiāngzhǎng). The township party secretary, along with the township's party committee, determines policy. The magistrate is in charge of administering the daily affairs of government and executing policies as determined by the party committee. A township official is the lowest-level ranked official in the civil service hierarchy; in practice, however, the township party secretary and magistrate can amass high levels of personal power.

A township government is formally responsible for local economic development, planning, maintenance of local roads, family planning, sanitation & health, sports, and "other responsibilities as determined by higher level governments".

== Types of townships ==
=== Urban ===
- Subdistricts (Chinese: 街道; pinyin: jiēdào)
- Towns (Chinese: 镇; pinyin: zhèn)

=== Rural ===
- Townships (Chinese: 乡; pinyin: xiāng)
- Sums of Inner Mongolia
- Ethnic townships, towns, and sums

== History ==
After the founding of the People's Republic of China in 1949, there was a lack of uniform regulations for establishing towns, and there were too many towns formed. By the end of 1954, there were 5,400 towns throughout the country, including 920 with a population of less than 2,000, 2,302 with a population of 2,000-5,000, 1,373 with a population of 5,000-10,000, 784 with a population of 10,000-50,000, and 21 with a population over 50,000. In June 1955, the State Council issued the "Decision on the Establishment of Cities and Towns", which clarified the criteria for the establishment of towns. By the end of 1978, there were only 2,173 townships in the country. After the abolition of the people's commune system, the establishment of townships was given importance.

On 29 November 1984, the State Council announced new standards for the establishment of townships.

- All local state organs at the county level should be set up as townships.
- Townships with a total population of less than 20,000 and a non-agricultural population of more than 2,000 in the seat of the township government may be established.
- For communes with a total population of more than 20,000, towns may be established if the non-agricultural population of the commune's governmental seat accounts for more than 10% of the commune's population.
- Ethnic minority areas, sparsely populated remote areas, mountainous areas and small industrial and mining areas, small ports, scenic tourist areas, border crossings, etc., although the non-agricultural population of less than 2,000, if necessary, can also set up towns.

== List of township-level divisions ==
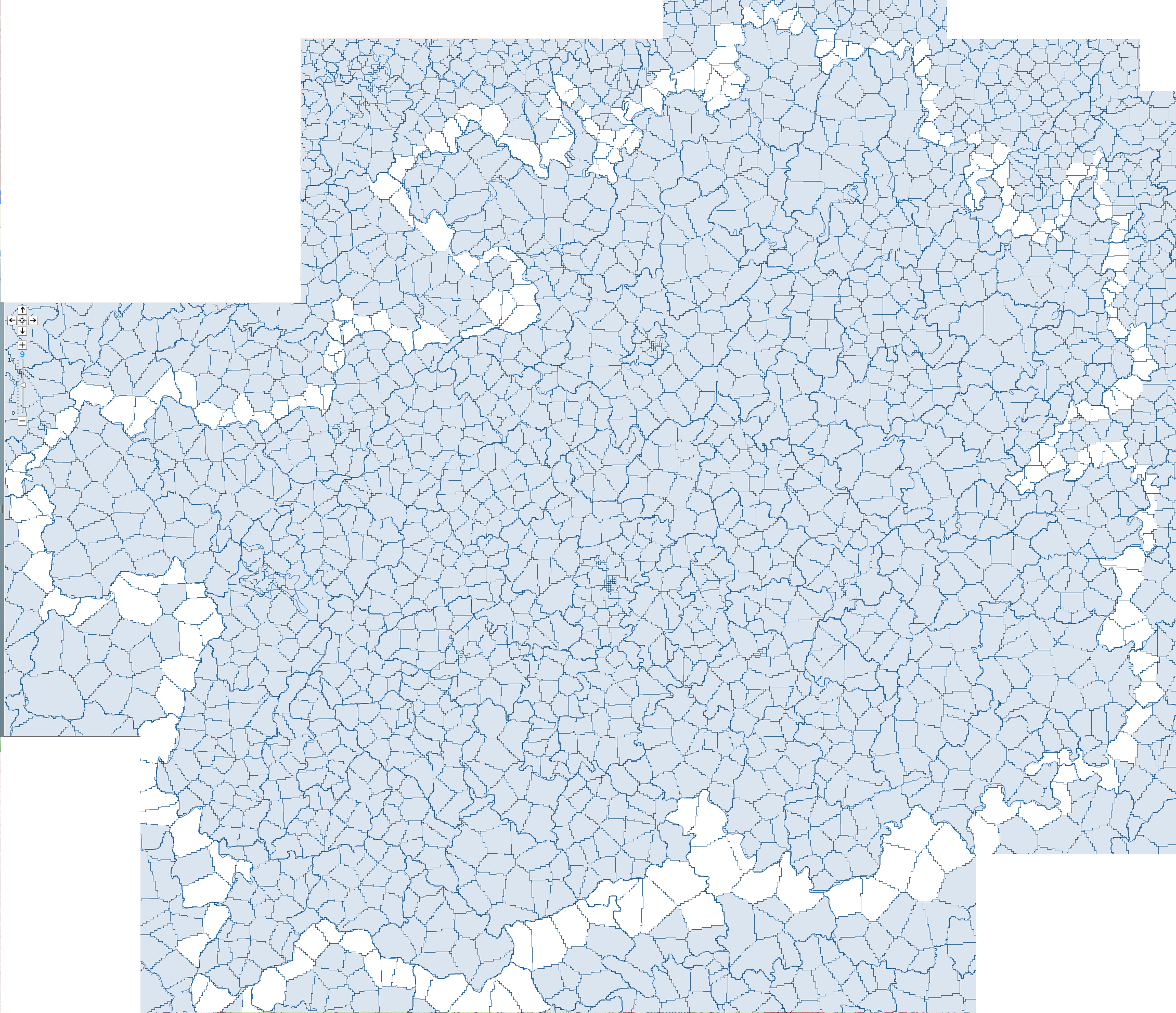
Township map of Guizhou

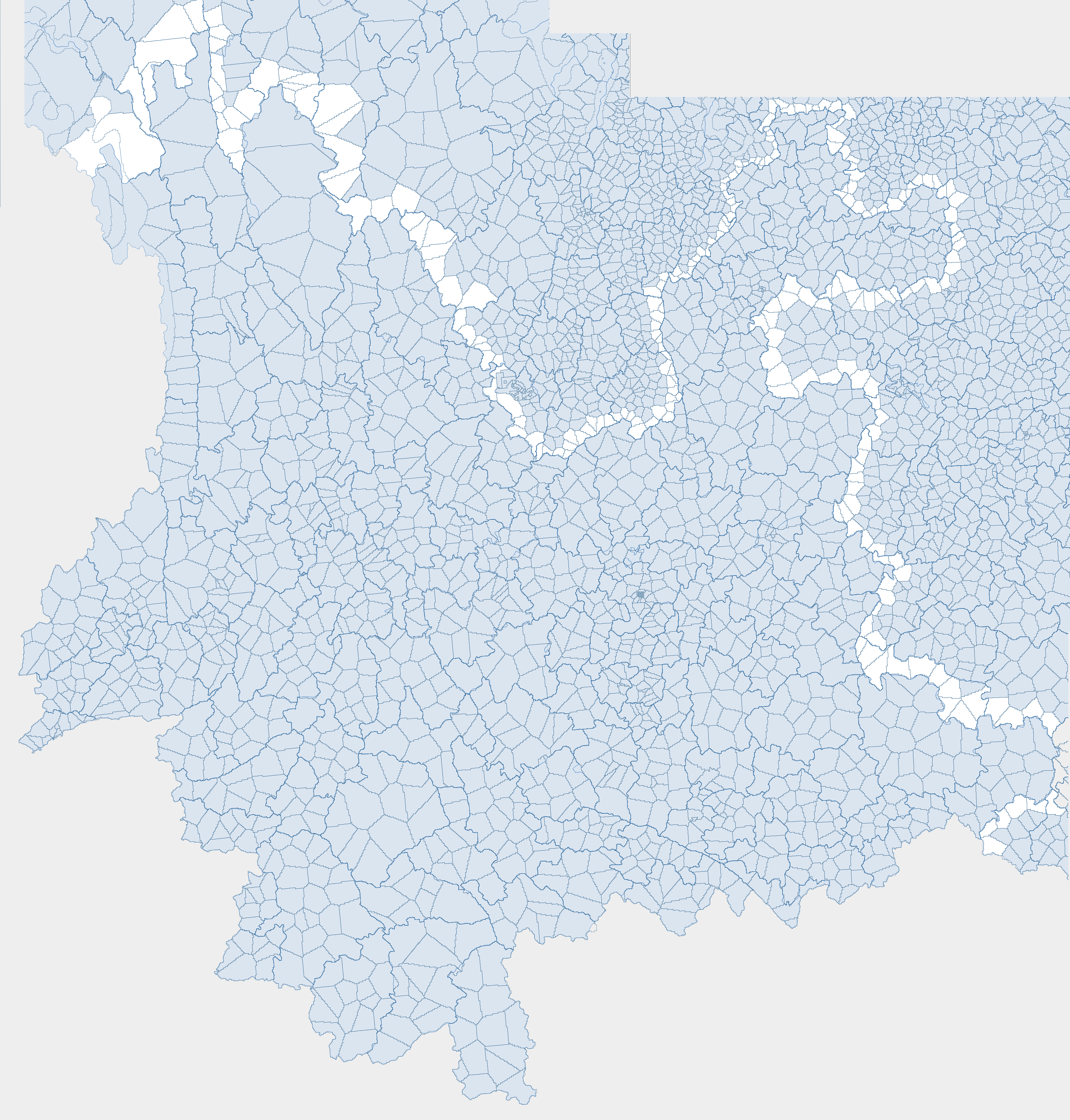
Township map of Yunnan

Provinces

- List of township-level divisions of Anhui
- List of township-level divisions of Fujian
- List of township-level divisions of Gansu
- List of township-level divisions of Guangdong
- List of township-level divisions of Guizhou
- List of township-level divisions of Hainan
- List of township-level divisions of Hebei
- List of township-level divisions of Heilongjiang
- List of township-level divisions of Henan
- List of township-level divisions of Hubei
- List of township-level divisions of Hunan
- List of township-level divisions of Jiangsu
- List of township-level divisions of Jiangxi
- List of township-level divisions of Jilin
- List of township-level divisions of Liaoning
- List of township-level divisions of Qinghai
- List of township-level divisions of Shaanxi
- List of township-level divisions of Shandong
- List of township-level divisions of Shanxi
- List of township-level divisions of Sichuan
- List of township-level divisions of Yunnan
- List of township-level divisions of Zhejiang

Autonomous areas

- List of township-level divisions of Guangxi
- List of township-level divisions of Inner Mongolia
- List of township-level divisions of Ningxia
- List of township-level divisions of the Tibet Autonomous Region
- List of township-level divisions of Xinjiang

Municipalities

- List of township-level divisions of Beijing
- List of township-level divisions of Chongqing
- List of township-level divisions of Shanghai
- List of township-level divisions of Tianjin

== Similar to township units ==
A similar to township unit in the system of administrative divisions of the People's Republic of China is a region with self-jurisdiction which functions at a PRC township-level administrative division. Divisions of this sort can include development zones, science and technology parks, university cities, companies, farms, fishing ground, ranches, orchards, national parks, etc., even prisons.

The township-level administrative division (the lowest level division) includes townships, towns, subdistricts, ethnic townships, and sums. Some county-level administrative districts that govern towns and villages will also be defined as a similar to township unit, as in the case of the Jiaozishan Tourism Development Zone and Industrial Park of Kunming.
