= 2023 Jishishan earthquake =

Earthquake in Gansu, China

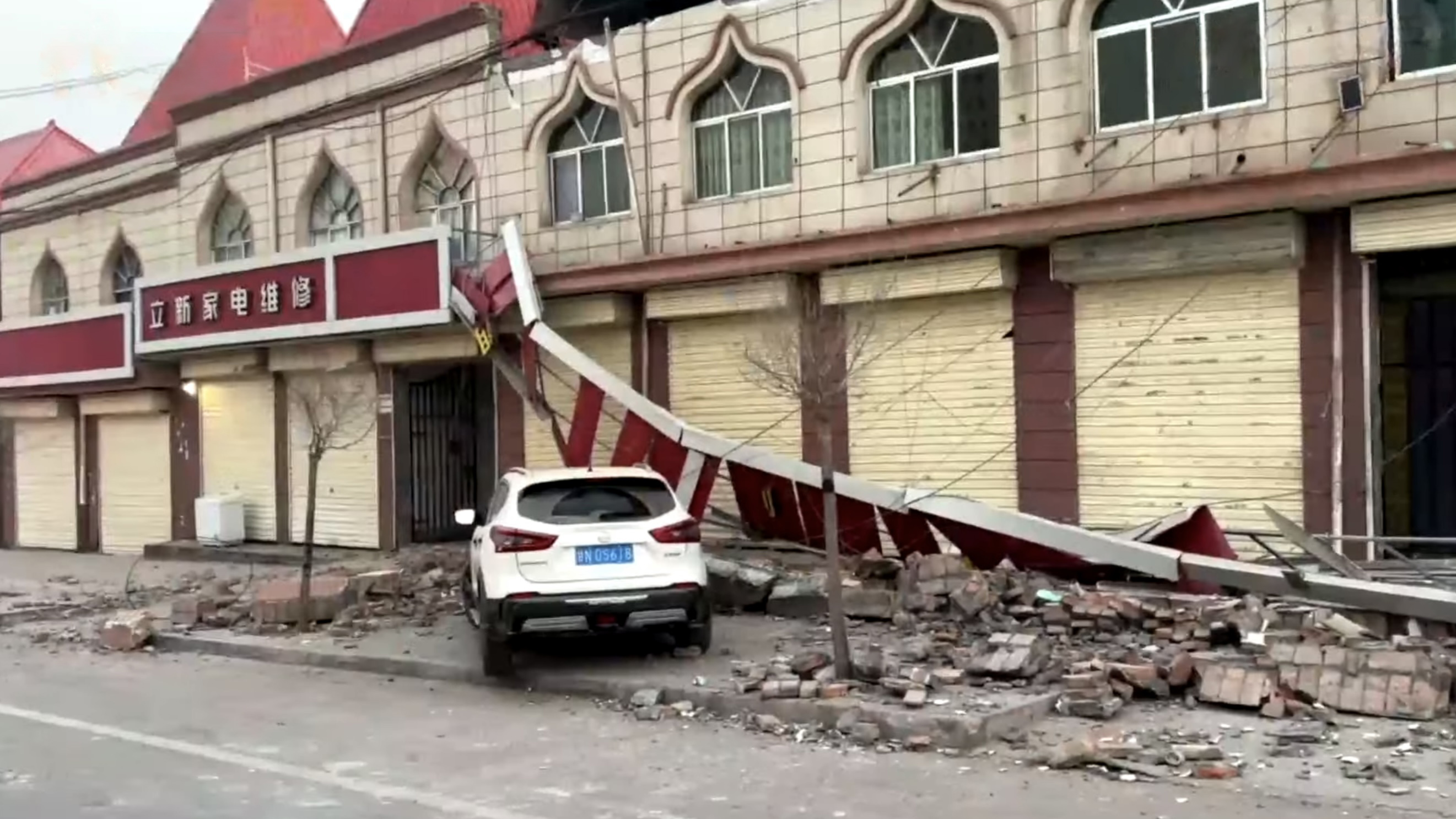
- Damaged buildings in Jishishan after the earthquake

- Location within Gansu Location within China
- UTC time: 2023-12-18 15:59:30
- ISC event: 636350642
- USGS-ANSS: ComCat
- Local date: 18 December 2023
- Local time: 23:59:30 CST (UTC+08:00)
- Magnitude: 6.2 M_{s} 6.1 M_{w} 5.9 M_{ww}
- Depth: 10 km (6 mi)
- Epicenter: 35.743°N 102.827°E
- Type: Thrust
- Areas affected: Gansu and Qinghai Provinces, China
- Total damage: CN¥ 14.61 billion (US$2.05 billion)
- Max. intensity: CSIS VIII–IX (MMI IX)
- Casualties: 151 fatalities, 982 injuries

On 18 December 2023 at around 23:59:30 CST, an earthquake with a magnitude of 5.9–6.2 struck Jishishan County, in Gansu Province, China. The shallow thrust faulting earthquake struck a densely populated area on the border between the provinces of Gansu and Qinghai. It caused 151 deaths and 982 injuries to others. This made it China's deadliest earthquake since the 2014 Ludian earthquake.

== Tectonic setting ==
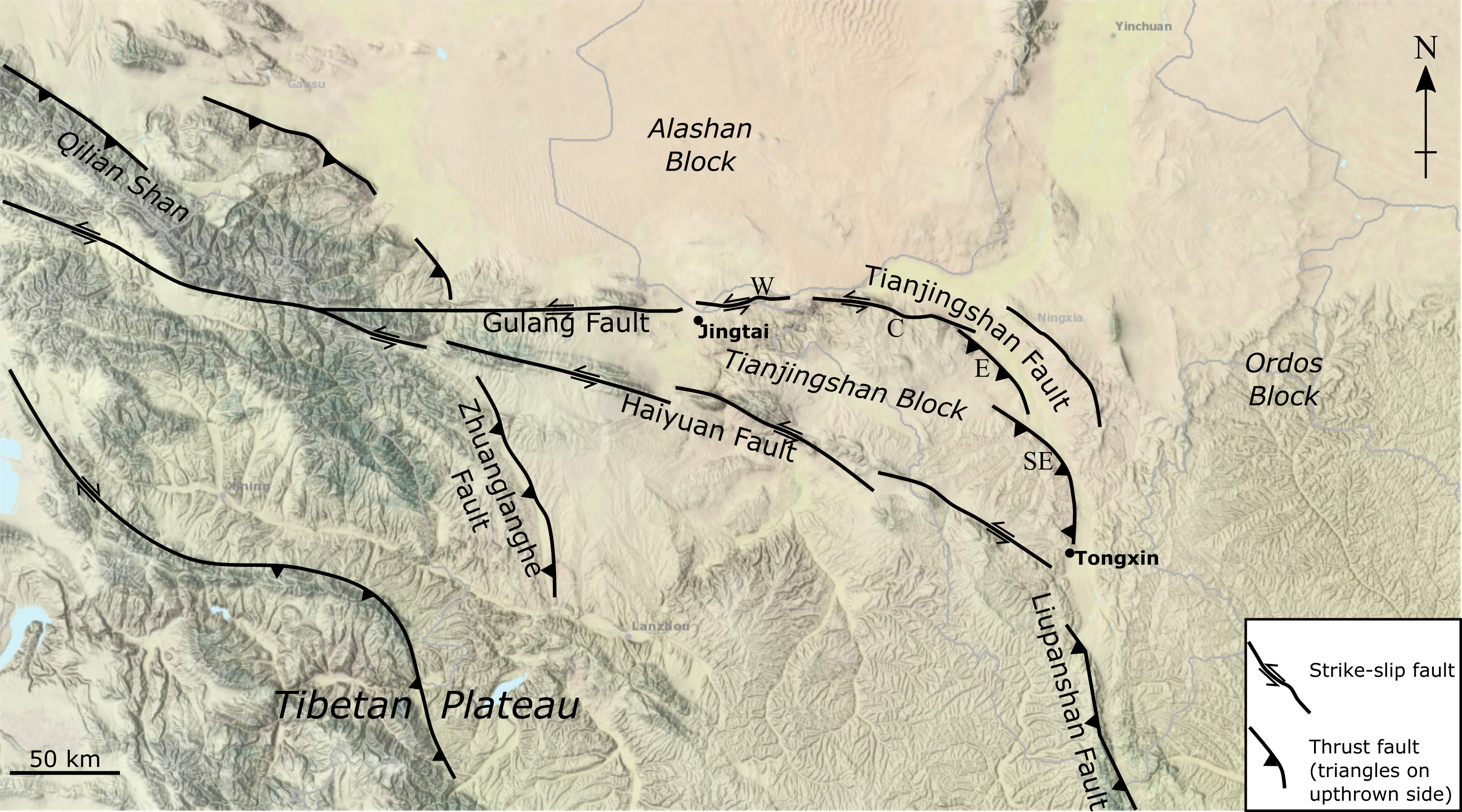
Major faults at the northeastern Tibetan Plateau; the earthquake occurred along the fault at the bottom left of the image

The Jishi Shan range lies in the easternmost segment of the Qilian Mountains that form part of the northern margin of the Tibetan Plateau. The plateau is a thickened zone of continental crust formed as a result of the ongoing collision between the Indian plate and the Eurasian plate. The plateau continues to be pushed northwards, while spreading laterally, causing the development of a combination of large left-lateral strike-slip faults and zone of thrust faulting. The NNW–SSE trending Jishi Shan range is bounded on both sides by faults that show evidence of both thrusting and strike-slip. Based on GPS observations, the most active of these structures is the eastern marginal fault, with estimated displacement rates of about 1 mm per year both for strike-slip and shortening.

The east–west trending Laji Shan Faults (northern and southern segments) bound the northern margin of the range while the northwest-striking Jishi Shan Faults (eastern and western segments) are located at the eastern end of the Laji Shan. These two fault structures represents a transpression zone between the right-lateral Riyue Shan Fault in the north and the left-lateral Qinling Fault in the south. Two prehistoric earthquakes were identified along the fault zone including one that may have destroyed Lajia. GNSS velocity observations indicate the Laji Shan Fault produces insignificant thrust and strike-slip movements. The Jishi Shan Fault shows greater thrust and right-lateral movement with its eastern segment showing greater activity. Earthquake potential along the Jishi Shan Fault is greater compared to the neighboring fault for moderate to strong events.

The Qilian Mountains have been the location for many large and damaging historical earthquakes. The largest of these was a M_{w} 7.7 earthquake in 1927 to the north that killed 40,000 people. The earthquake was the result of thrust faulting and brought extreme damage in the Gulang–Wuwei area and triggered damaging landslides. Gansu was also affected by another earthquake in 1920, a result of strike-slip faulting, which killed 200,000 people; often regarded as among the deadliest earthquakes of the 20th century. In 1990, a M_{w} 6.5 earthquake, immediately preceded by a M_{w} 6.3 foreshock and followed by a M_{w} 6.3 aftershock, led to at least 126 fatalities and extensive damage and landslides.

Earthquake-related losses in China are common, even for moderate magnitude earthquakes, due to the proximity of large population centers to shaking, the prevalence of structures that are vulnerable to earthquake shaking, and the occurrence of landslides in steep topography.

== Earthquake ==
Map of 2023 Jishishan earthquake sequence (map data)

The China Earthquake Administration recorded the earthquake at 6.2 on the surface-wave magnitude scale. The United States Geological Survey said it measured M_{ww} 5.9 and struck at a depth of 10 km (6.2 mi). The epicenter was estimated to be in Liugou Township, about 8 kilometers from the county seat of Jishishan. The Global Centroid Moment Tensor registered the shock at M_{w} 6.1 at 18.9 km (11.7 mi) depth. Shaking was reported to have lasted for nearly 20 seconds and was felt by residents as far as Xi'an, 570 km (350 mi) away in Shaanxi province. At least 512 aftershocks were recorded by 21 December with two of the largest measuring 4.1.

The earthquake occurred as a result of reverse faulting at shallow depth. It ruptured either along a north-striking, steeply dipping, reverse fault or a south-southeast striking, shallow-dipping, reverse fault. The region where the earthquake occurred is an intraplate region located on the northern margin of the Tibetan Plateau, a high topographic region north of the Himalayas that developed in response to ongoing collision between the Indian plate and Eurasian plate. The National Institute of Geophysics and Volcanology in Italy developed a finite fault model from InSAR; illustrating a fault shallow-dipping (11°) to the west–southwest and striking north-northwest–south-southeast. Peak slip of 1.9 m (6 ft 3 in) occurred in the hypocenter area at 9.6 km (6.0 mi) depth. Slip occurred bilaterally along the fault's strike relative to the epicenter forming an elongated elliptical area where movement was detected. The slip area dimensions was estimated to be at least 14 km (8.7 mi) by 5 km (3.1 mi). No slip occurred at the surface.

The earthquake rupture occurred along a 18 km (11 mi) fault; it mainly propagated in a northwesterly direction along the fault's strike from the hypocenter. Slip was observed at 5–15 km (3.1–9.3 mi) depth suggesting a buried rupture with no slip at the surface. The entire rupture process took 12 seconds. Data from strong ground motion sensors also supported the northwestern-propagating rupture.

According to a professor at the China University of Geosciences, Xu Xiwei, the earthquake was associated with a fault along the northern edge of the Laji Mountain range. The China Earthquake Networks Center said the seismic sequence was consistent with a mainshock–aftershock type event. Within 200 km (120 mi) of the earthquake's epicenter, only three earthquakes greater than magnitude 6.0 have occurred. In 1936, a M_{s} 6.8 earthquake caused significant destruction and deaths in Kangle County, Gansu.

== Impact ==
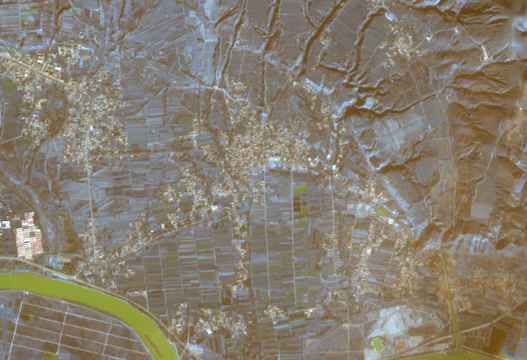
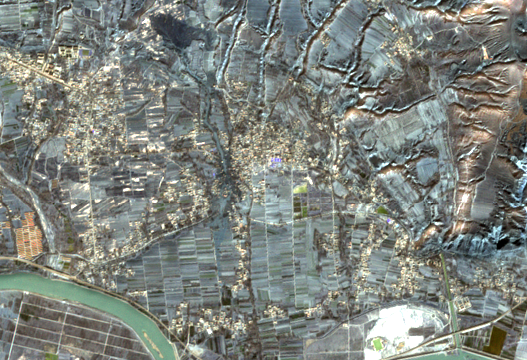
Minhe county before (left) and after (right) landslide

At least 151 deaths and 982 injuries were reported; 117 people were killed and 784 were injured in Gansu. Seventy-eight people died in Dahejia, 23 in Liuji Township, eight in Shiyuan, three in Chuimatan and one each in Xu Hujia, Guanjiachuan and Zhongzuiling townships. Thirty-four deaths, 198 injuries and two missing people were reported in neighbouring Qinghai province, with the last two fatalities found on 31 December. All deaths in Qinghai occurred in the city of Haidong. At least 16 of the injured were said to be in critical condition. Over 140,000 people were affected across the region. The earthquake was considered the deadliest to affect China since the 2014 Ludian earthquake. Li Haibing, an expert at the Chinese Academy of Geological Sciences, attributed the casualties and damage from the earthquake to its timing, shallow depth, vertical movement, and the low quality of building materials in the area.

At least 15,000 houses collapsed and 207,000 others were damaged. In Jishishan County, many houses collapsed while at least 5,000 buildings were damaged. A rescue team director said many houses in the area were old and made of clay. Residents were trapped in three villages near Dahejia. Communications, transport, electrical and water services were knocked out in some villages. A debris slide due to soil liquefaction occurred in the village of Jintian in Minhe Hui and Tu Autonomous County, Qinghai. The debris slide buried the village under 2.5–3 m (8 ft 2 in – 9 ft 10 in) of mud, destroying 51 homes and leaving at least 20 people dead. It was reported that muddy sediment, which had liquefied due to the area's high water table, burst through the surface and flowed into the village through a usually dry ditch. In one village of Gansu, four-fifths of its homes were rendered uninhabitable.

Several sections of the Qingshui-Dahejia Highway were blocked by rockfalls. In Xunhua County, homes in several villages were damaged including in Qingshui Township, Daogu Township and Jishi town. In Minhe County, Guanting Town and Zhongchuan Township were among the places with casualties and severe damage. The shocks were also felt in Lanzhou, prompting residents to leave their dwellings. China Central Television reported many buildings collapsed while people fled to the streets.

Preliminary assessments by officials in Gansu found that the earthquake caused ¥532 million (US$74.6 million) in damage to the province's agriculture and fisheries sectors. The Ministry of Emergency Management estimated the total damage at CN¥ 14.61 billion (US$2.05 billion).

The Chengdu University of Technology reported a maximum China seismic intensity scale of IX. A maximum intensity of VIII was reported in two areas according to an isoseismal map by the Ministry of Emergency Management. The larger of the two was an elongated area trending north–northwest which covers 331 km^{2} (128 sq mi) while a smaller zone to the north covered 15 km^{2} (5.8 sq mi). A seismic station in Dahejia recorded the largest Mercalli intensity value of 9.4 (IX).

== Response ==
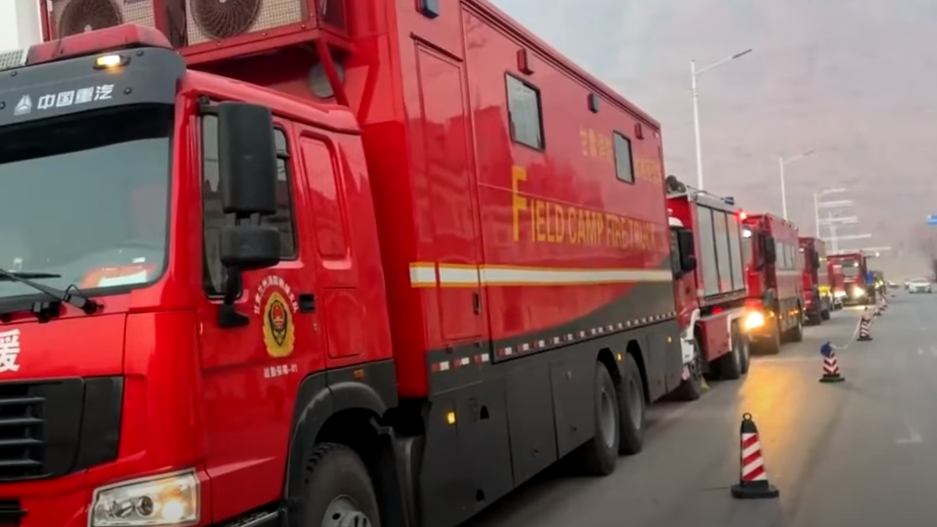
Rescue trucks parked at the side of a road in Jishishan in the aftermath

Xi Jinping, the General Secretary of the Chinese Communist Party, said "all efforts should be made to carry out search and rescue, treat the injured in a timely manner, and minimise casualties". The Chinese government announced 200 million yuan in emergency aid for rescue work. Premier Li Qiang subsequently visited the affected area and called on officials to "improve living conditions" for survivors.

The Ministry of Emergency Management issued a level four emergency response. Rescue workers from the local emergency management and fire departments were deployed to the affected region. Nearly 2,200 provincial fire department, forest brigade and professional emergency rescue teams members were activated. Members of the military and police were also involved, with the Western Theater Command of the People's Liberation Army establishing a command post. The Gansu Fire Brigade deployed 1,440 personnel, 88 fire trucks, 12 search and rescue dogs and 10,000 rescue equipment. To assist local emergency personnel, the Chinese government also deployed teams of rescue workers to the area. Social media footage showed rescue personnel combing through rubble and unfolding stretchers for casualties. Emergency services set up tents as temperatures in the area fell to subzero ranges as low as −15 °C, with snowy conditions also being reported. An expert warned on China Newsweek that the freezing conditions could hamper rescue efforts and shorten the time window needed to rescue survivors. Firefighters rescued a total of 78 people by the morning of 20 December, while search and rescue was called off the day before as treating the injured became a priority.

Passenger and cargo railway services in the affected area were stopped to facilitate safety inspections. Hu Changsheng, Chinese Communist Party Committee Secretary of Gansu, and governor Ren Zhenhe subsequently visited the affected areas. At Dahejia, more than 140 local hospital workers attended to the injured. Cracks developed within the walls, prompting makeshift beds to be laid by the roadside. Village residents were evacuated while taxis transported injured survivors away. At Dahe village, a relief team established a camp in the village square. Shelter, folding beds and blankets were distributed. All 15 boarding schools in Jishishan County, which hosted a total of 14,700 students and teachers, were evacuated. More than 139,000 people were resettled in both provinces by 22 December. Many affected residents resided in makeshift plastic and quilt tents. On 21 December, single-room accommodation units were constructed. Funeral processions also began for most victims, following Islamic customs in accordance with the predominant faith in the affected region.

Classes in the primary level resumed in Jishishan County on 25 December, but were held in tents as officials said repairs to school buildings were expected to last throughout the winter. The governor of Linxia Prefecture said 12,000 preconstructed homes were expected to be ready by 27 December. Nearly 8,800 had arrived in the affected area while 8,096 were being transported. About 1,165 pre-constructed classrooms were created in preparation for the new school semester in response to the 244 damaged schools.

== Reactions ==
António Guterres, the Secretary-General of the United Nations, expressed his solidarity with the Chinese people and government and extended condolences to the families of the victims. Taiwanese president Tsai Ing-wen expressed condolences and offered assistance, while interim Pakistani prime minister Anwaar ul Haq Kakar said he was "deeply saddened" over the earthquake. The Ministry of Foreign Affairs of Turkey offered condolences to the victims of the earthquake in a statement. Russian prime minister Mikhail Mishustin expressed condolences over the casualties to Chinese premier Li Qiang during a meeting. According to Wang Wenbin, a Foreign Ministry spokesperson, leaders from 20 countries (Note: Russian president Vladimir Putin, Cambodian king Norodom Sihamoni, Pakistan president Arif Alvi, Maldives president Mohamed Muizzu, South Korean president Yoon Suk Yeol, United Arab Emirates president Mohamed bin Zayed Al Nahyan, Central African Republic president Faustin-Archange Touadéra, Belarusian president Alexander Lukashenko, Kazakh president Kassym-Jomart Tokayev, Turkmen president Serdar Berdimuhamedow, Uzbek president Shavkat Mirziyoyev, Tajik president Emomali Rahmon, German president Frank-Walter Steinmeier, Italian president Sergio Mattarella, Serbian president Aleksandar Vučić, three members of the presidency of Bosnia and Herzegovina, Hungarian president Katalin Novák, Nicaraguan president Daniel Ortega, Bangladeshi prime minister Sheikh Hasina, and Japanese prime minister Fumio Kishida.) expressed their condolences.

== See also ==
- List of earthquakes in 2023
- List of earthquakes in China
