= Jiezi Mosque =

Mosque in Jiezi, Xunhua, Qinghai, China

- 街子清真寺
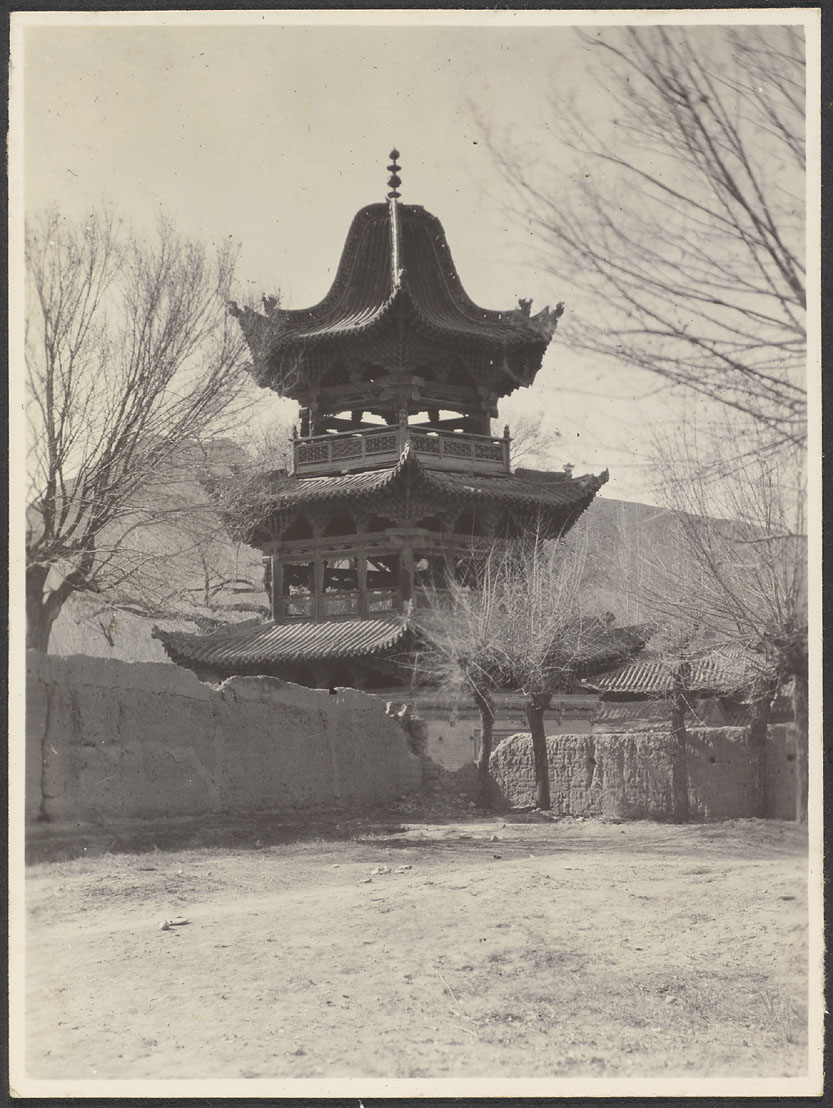

Religion
- Affiliation: Sunni Islam
- Ecclesiastical or organizational status: Mosque
- Status: Active

Location
- Location: Jiezi, Xunhua, Qinghai
- Country: China

Architecture
- Type: Mosque

Chinese name
- Simplified Chinese: 街子清真寺
Transcriptions
Standard Mandarin
- Hanyu Pinyin: Jiēzǐ Qīngzhēnsì

The Jiezi Mosque (Chinese: 街子清真寺; pinyin: Jiēzǐ Qīngzhēnsì) is a mosque in Jiezi Town, Xunhua Salar Autonomous County, Qinghai Province, China. It is regarded as the ancestral mosque of the Salar people and is the second largest mosque in Qinghai Province.

== History ==
The mosque was built in the early years of the Ming dynasty, in the third year of the Hongwu reign. It was later expanded during the Qing dynasty and again in 1931. During the Cultural Revolution, the structure was destroyed. In 1982, it was rebuilt with government funding and public donations, modeled after the Kashgar Mosque in Xinjiang. Since 2009, it is listed as a provincial-level cultural heritage protection item.

The mosque serves as a place of worship for the Salar Muslim minority and is the second largest mosque in Qinghai Province.

== Oldest Quran Manuscript ==
The mosque houses a rare handwritten copy of the Quran that is regarded as the oldest of its kind in China. The manuscript consists of 867 pages in two volumes and is written in Arabic. Experts believe it dates between the 8th and 13th centuries.

According to the National Catalogue of Precious Ancient Books (国家珍贵古籍名录) published by the Ministry of Culture, the manuscript is listed as a precious ancient book and is dated to the 13th century.

Historical accounts state that the Quran was brought to China by the ancestors of the Salar people when they migrated east from Samarkand about 700 to 800 years ago. The manuscript was handwritten by Arab Muslims, unlike other early copies in China written by Chinese Muslims.

In 2007, Chinese authorities funded a restoration project. Experts from the Nanjing Museum conducted scientific analysis of the paper and ink, cleaned mildew, and repaired damaged pages using conservation techniques. In 2009, the manuscript was included in the national list of precious cultural heritage items and placed in a specially constructed exhibition hall beside the mosque, where it is preserved in a temperature and humidity controlled glass case.

The mosque museum also displays later printed copies of the Quran, many reflecting traditional Chinese calligraphic styles.

== See also ==
- Islam in China
- List of mosques in China
