= Erlitou culture =

Bronze Age culture in China

Coordinates: 34.693°N 112.689°E

- Erlitou in eastern China
- Geographical range: Western Henan
- Period: Bronze Age China
- Dates: c. 1900–1500 BC (general estimates) c. 1750–1530 BC (2007 radiocarbon dating study estimates)
- Type site: Erlitou
- Preceded by: Longshan culture
- Followed by: Erligang culture
- Defined by: Xu Xusheng

Chinese name
- Traditional Chinese: 二里頭文化
- Simplified Chinese: 二里头文化
Transcriptions
Standard Mandarin
- Hanyu Pinyin: Èrlǐtóu wénhuà

The Erlitou culture (Chinese: 二里頭; pinyin: Èrlǐtóu) was an early Bronze Age society and archaeological culture in the Yellow River valley. Early estimates dated it from approximately 1900 to 1500 BC. Radiocarbon dating studies since 2007 have yielded a narrower date range of 1750–1500 BC. The culture is named after Erlitou, an archaeological site in Yanshi, Henan. It was widely spread throughout Henan and Shanxi and later appeared in Shaanxi and Hubei. Most archaeologists consider Erlitou the first state-level society in China.

Chinese archaeologists generally identify the Erlitou culture with the later part of the Xia dynasty, due to its location and chronology being consistent with traditional accounts. Some Western scholars argue that such a conclusion is premature, as unlike the Late Shang period, no contemporary written records have yet been found to prove the linkage.

== Erlitou site ==
Map of discovered Erlitou culture sites; important sites are underscored with a green line

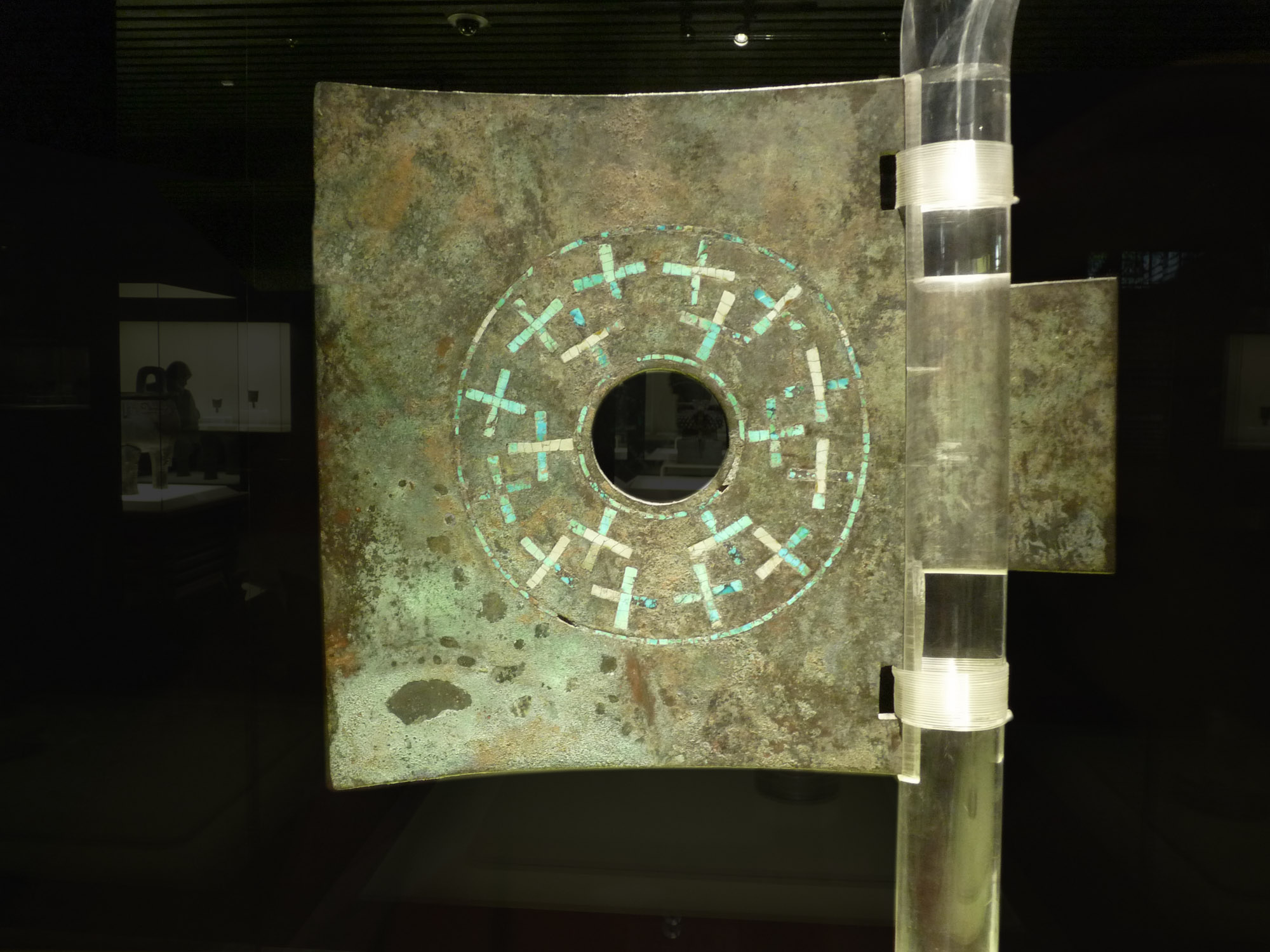
Bronze ceremonial axe (yuè 鉞) with pattern of crosses inlaid in turquoise, dated between 1800 and 1500 BC

The Erlitou culture may have evolved from the matrix of Longshan culture. Originally centered around Henan and Shanxi province, the culture spread to Shaanxi and Hubei provinces. After the rise of the Erligang culture, the site at Erlitou diminished in size but remained inhabited.

Discovered in 1959 by Xu Xusheng, Erlitou is the largest site associated with the culture, with palace buildings and bronze smelting workshops. Erlitou monopolized the production of ritual bronze vessels, including the earliest recovered dings. The city is on the Yi River, a tributary of the Luo River, which flows into the Yellow River. The city was 2.4 by 1.9 kilometres (1.5 by 1.2 mi); however, because of flood damage only 3 km^{2} (1.2 sq mi) are left.

The Erlitou Site Museum of the Xia Capital, located in Luoyang, Henan province, which has more than 2,000 items excavated from the Erlitou site in its collection, opened in October 2019.

=== Phases ===
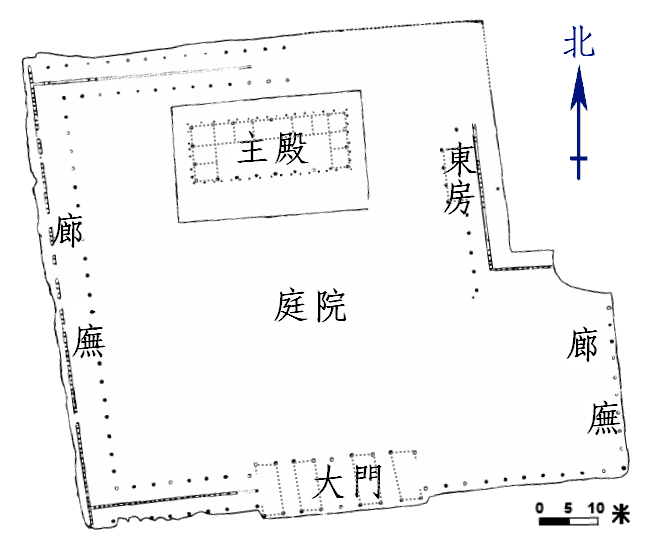
Architectural layout of palace 1 (phase III)

The site's growth is divided into four phases.

During Phase I, covering 100 ha (250 acres), Erlitou was a rapidly growing regional center with an estimated population of several thousand people, but not yet an urban civilization.

Urbanization began in Phase II, expanding to 300 ha (740 acres) with a population of around 11,000. A palace area of 12 ha (30 acres) was demarcated by four roads. It contained the 150 m × 50 m (490 ft × 160 ft) Palace 3, composed of three courtyards along a 150-metre axis, and Palace 5. A bronze foundry was established to the south of the palatial complex and was controlled by the elite. Tracks of vehicles were discovered near the palace. This is the earliest example of the usage of wheeled wagons in China.

The city reached its peak in Phase III, and may have had a population of around 24,000. The palatial complex was surrounded by a two-meter-thick rammed-earth wall, and Palaces 1, 7, 8 and 9 were built. Palace 1, the largest, had an area of 9,600 m^{2} (103,000 sq ft). Palaces 3 and 5 were abandoned and replaced by Palace 2, measuring 4,200 m^{2} (45,000 sq ft), and Palace 4.

In Phase IV, the population decreased to around 20,000, but building continued. Palace 6 was built as an extension of Palace 2, and Palaces 10 and 11 were built. Phase IV overlaps with the Lower Phase of the Erligang culture (1600–1450 BC). Around 1600 BC, a walled city was built at Yanshi, about 6 km (3.7 mi) northeast of Erlitou.

Production of bronzes and other elite goods ceased at the end of Phase IV, at the same time as the Erligang city of Zhengzhou was established 85 km (53 mi) to the east. There is no evidence of destruction by fire or war, but, during the Upper Erligang phase (1450–1300 BC), all the palaces were abandoned, and Erlitou was reduced to a village of 30 ha (74 acres).

== Bronzeworking ==
The Erlitou culture is the earliest large-scale bronze producing culture in China, with the new-fashioned section-mold process there to produce ritual vessels and other bronzes.

Although the remains of bronze have been found in the Qijia and Siba Cultures, Erlitou bronzes are significantly more advanced and prolific. The Erlitou culture not only has bronze tools and bell musical instruments, but also bronze weapons and unique animal-faced plaques, especially more than ten kinds of bronze vessels have been unearthed. This shows that the bronze casting of Erlitou is diverse and systematic.

There are no copper resources in the Luoyang Plain. It has been suggested the Eridou culture acquired the ore in the Zhongtiao Mountains of southern Shanxi, the same place they probably acquired salt.

Erlitou bronzes have obvious features imitating pottery, with plain surfaces or simple geometric patterns. In the third phase of the Erlitou culture, the perforated decoration that was very popular throughout the Erlitou culture appeared on the bronze jue.

Many archetypal Chinese artifacts were first found in Erlitou culture sites. The earliest bronze ding in China were found in the fourth stage of the Erlitou culture, decorated with striped grid patterns. The earliest metal bells, with one found in the Taosi site, and four in the Erlitou site, dated to about 2000 BC, may have been derived from the earlier pottery prototype. The first bronze dagger-axe or ge appeared at the Erlitou site, where two were found among over 200 bronze artifacts (as of 2002) at the site. Three jade ge were also discovered from the same site.

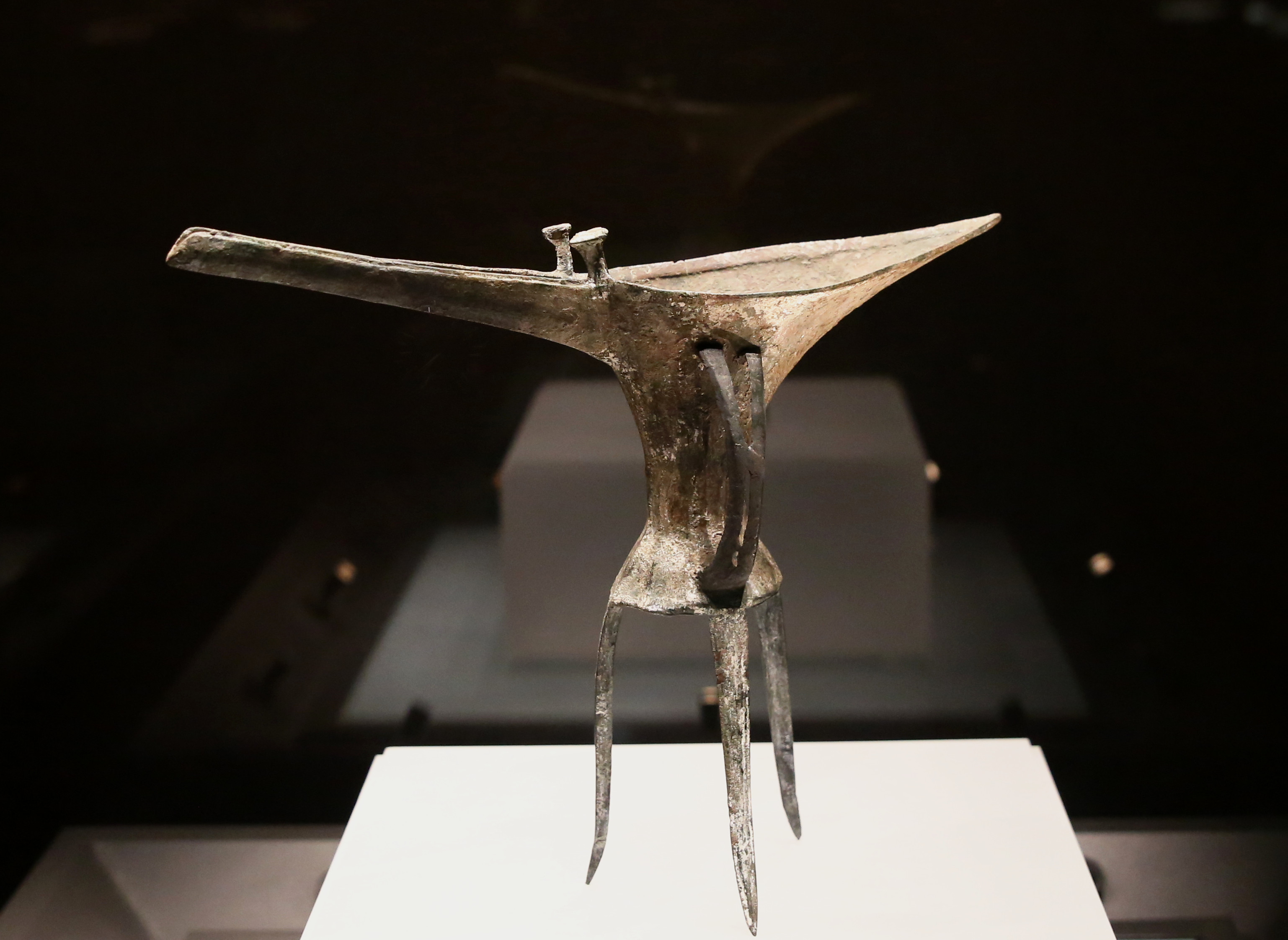
Bronze jue goblet

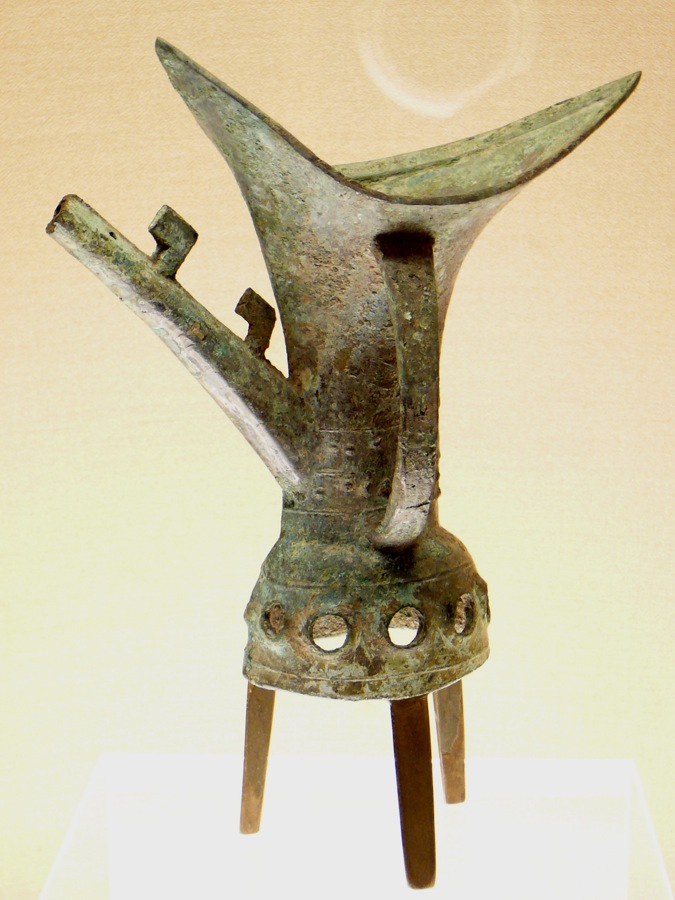
Bronze jue goblet

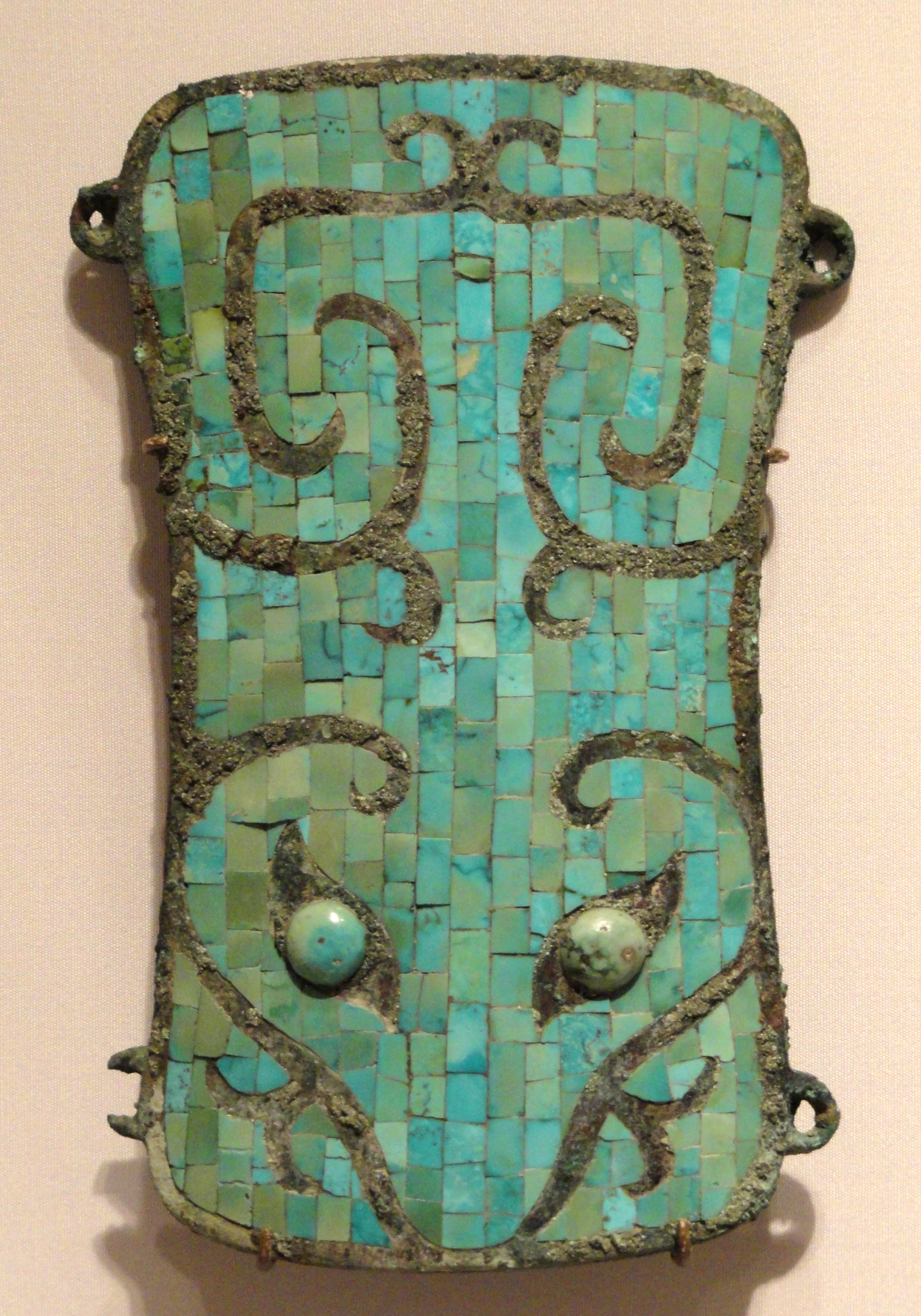
Ornamental bronze plaque inlaid with turquoise pieces

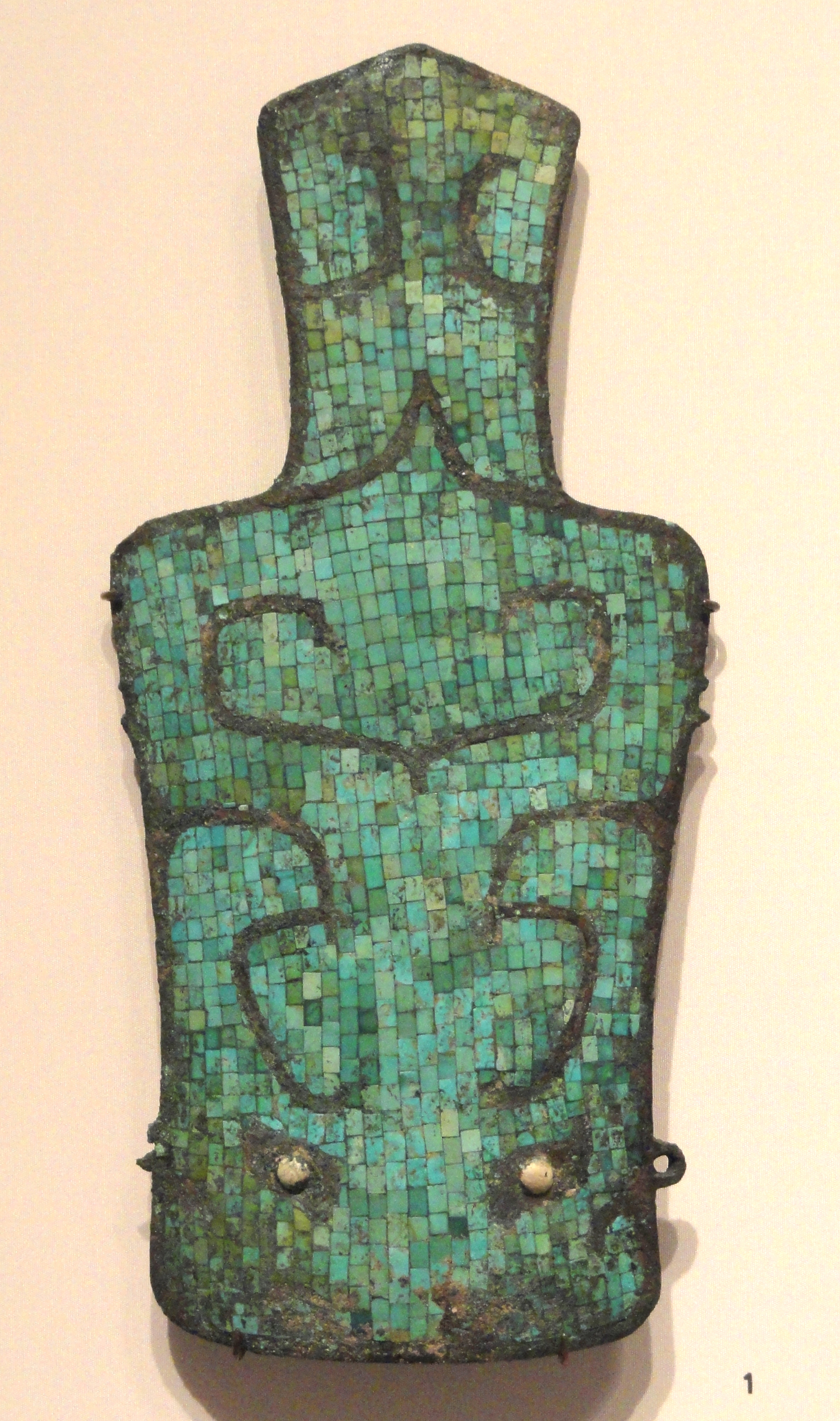

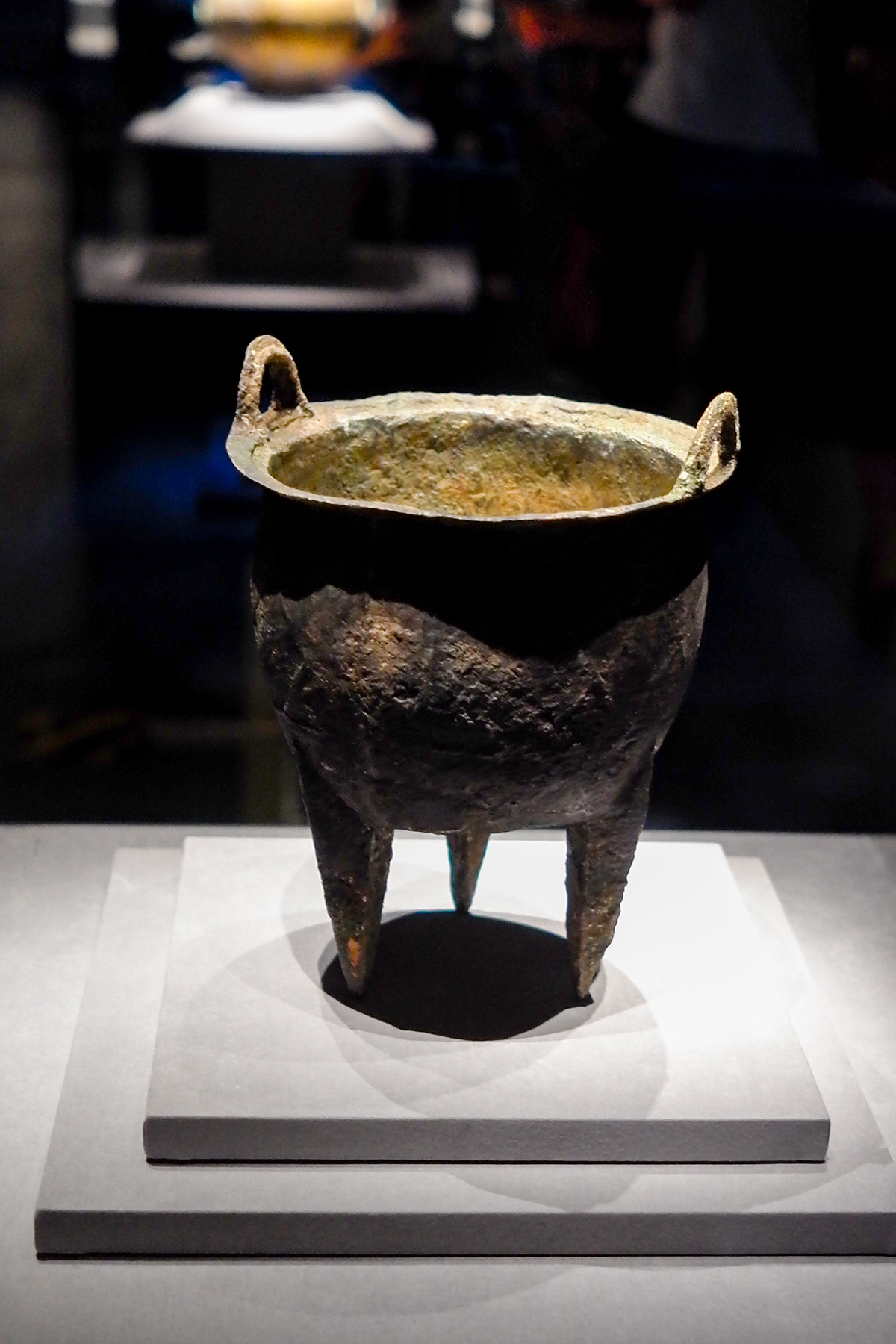
Bronze ding cauldron

== Jadeworking ==
Like other contemporaneous cultures in China, jade was worked into ritual objects at Erlitou sites. These included ceremonial blades (zhang) as well as ritual dagger-axes (ge).

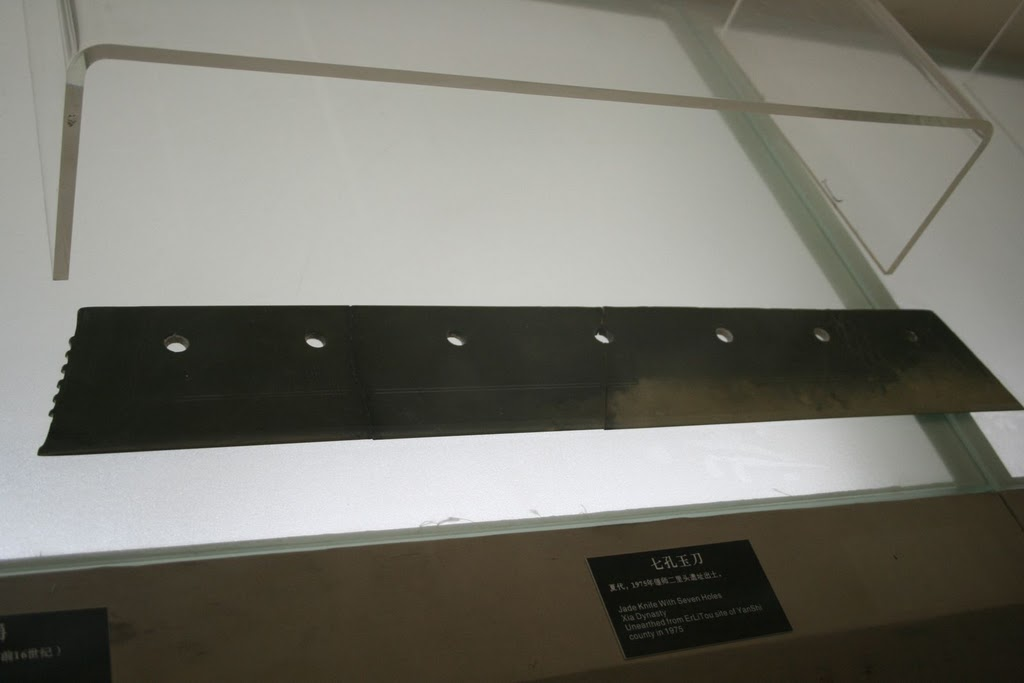
Jade ritual blade with seven holes

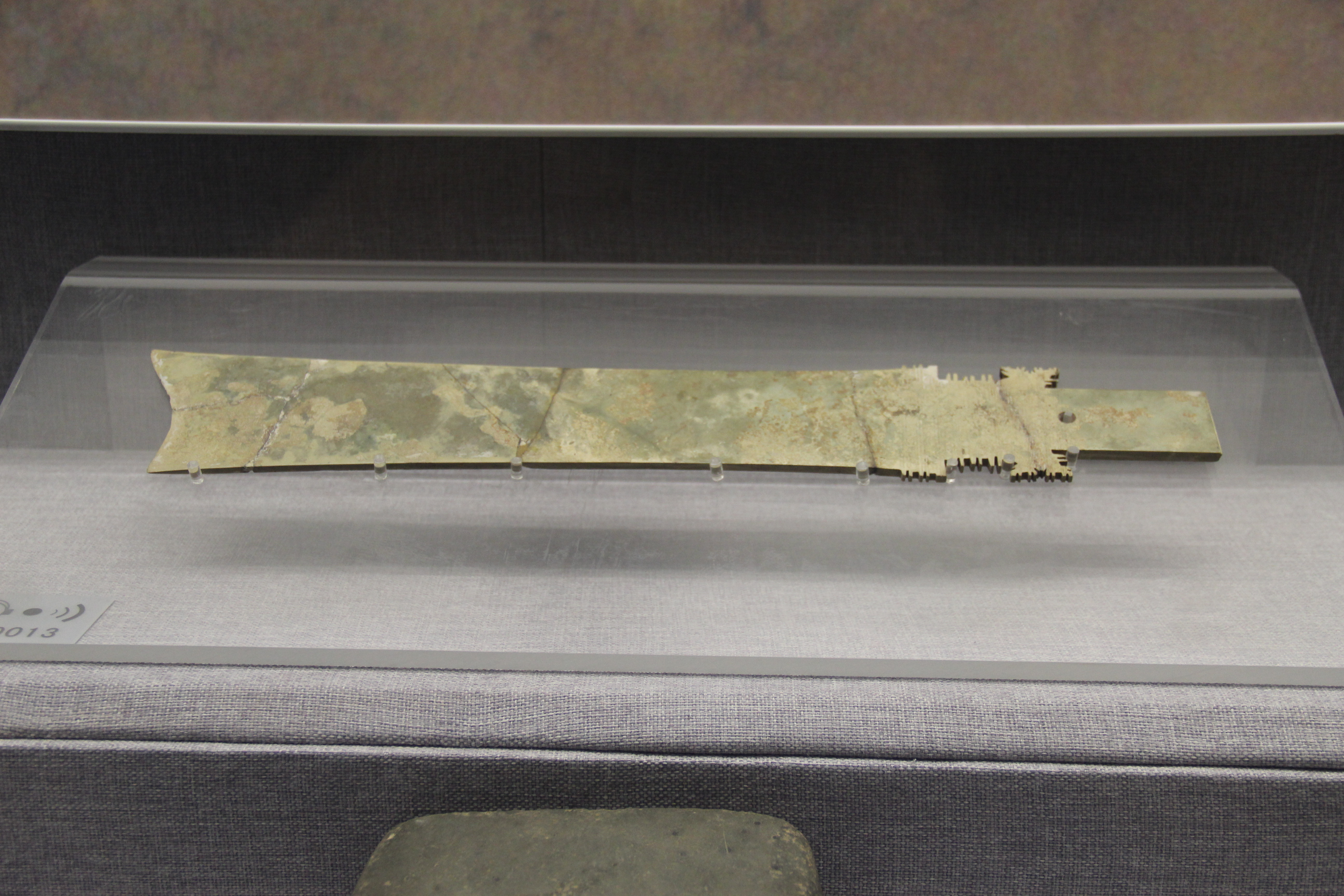
Jade ritual blade with ornate edges

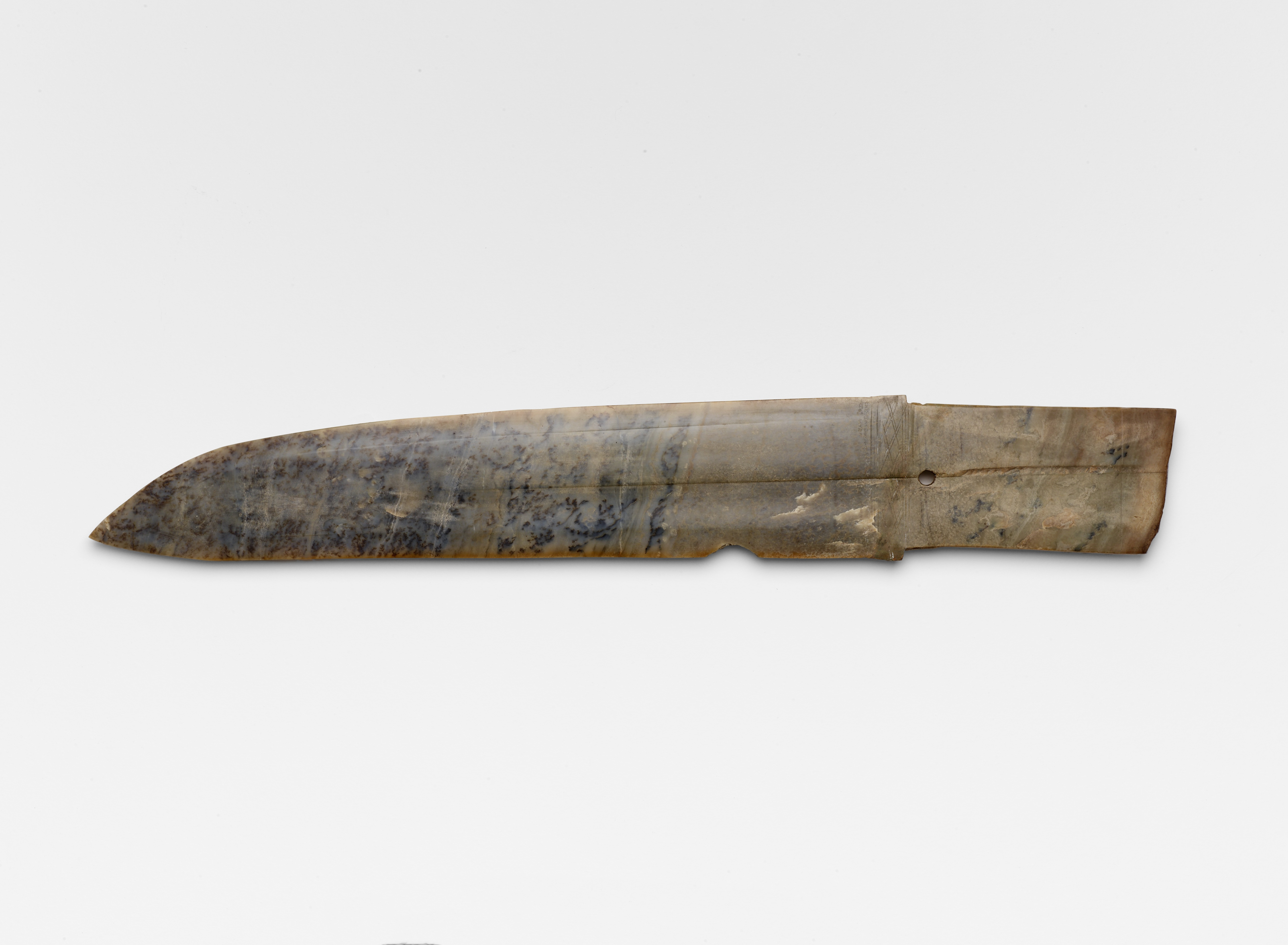
Jade ritual dagger-axe (ge)

== Symbols ==
Symbols on ceramic pieces have been found at Erlitou culture sites, leading to speculation about possible connections with early Chinese characters, which appear several centuries later in the same region. However, no clear linkage has been proven yet, thus the symbols are currently considered markings or proto-writing.

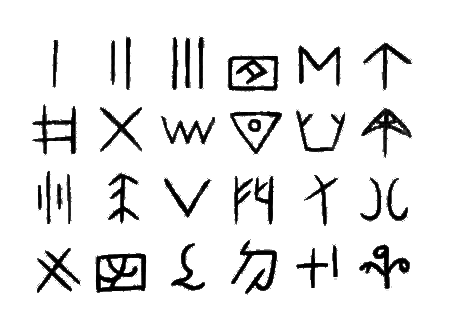
Early symbols appearing on ceramics; from the site of Yanshi

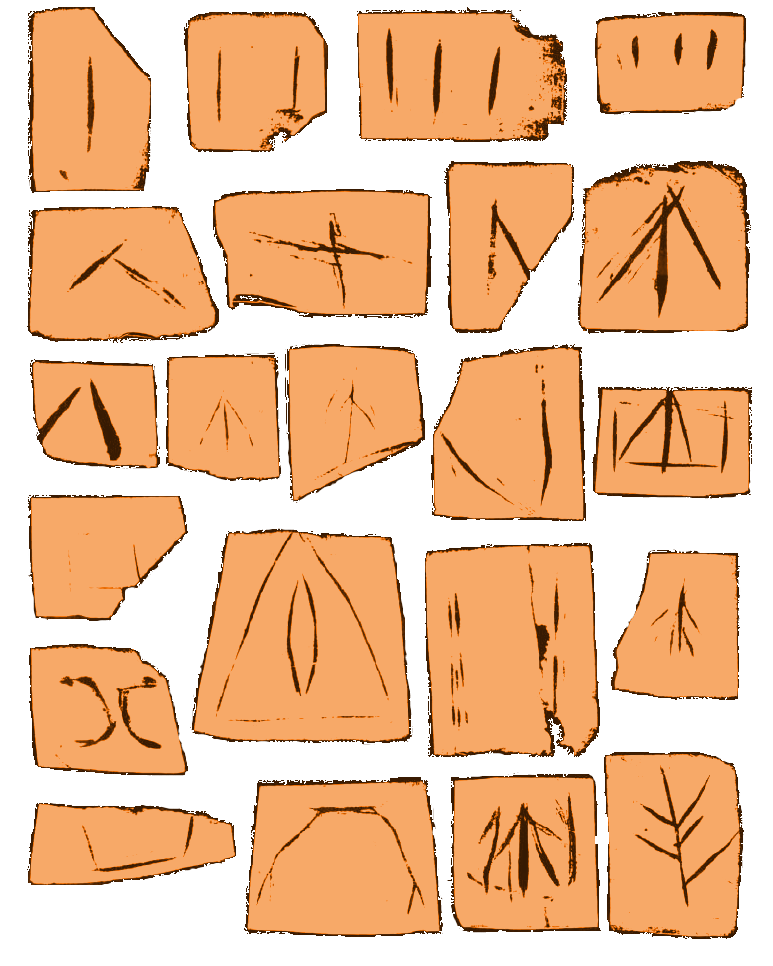

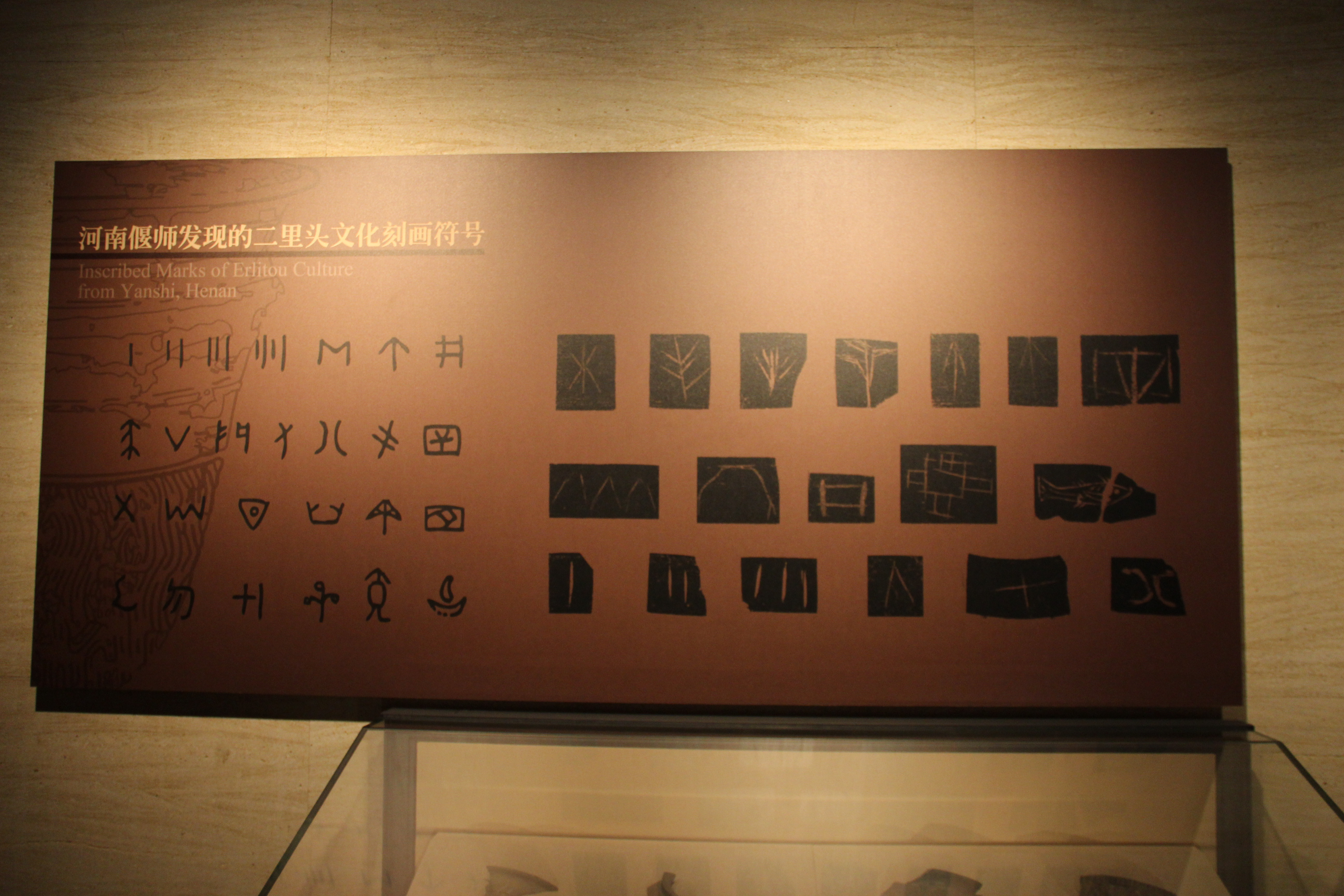

== Relation to traditional accounts ==
Erlitou sites (black) and Xia capitals identified in traditional sources (red, with numbers for those from the "current text" version of the Bamboo Annals)

A major goal of archaeology in China has been the search for the capitals of the Xia and Shang dynasties described in traditional accounts as inhabiting the Yellow River valley. These originally oral traditions were recorded much later in histories such as the Bamboo Annals (c. 300 BC) and the Records of the Grand Historian (1st century BC), and their historicity, particularly regarding the Xia, was challenged by the Doubting Antiquity School of Chinese history. The discovery of writing in the form of oracle bones at Yinxu in Anyang definitively established the site as the last capital of the Shang, but such evidence is unavailable for earlier sites.

The Erlitou culture is found in broadly the same area (southern Shanxi and western Henan) and same period (early second millennium BC) as the received texts indicate for the Xia, leading many scholars, especially in China, to identify the Erlitou culture as the material residue of the Xia, with Erlitou as its capital.

When Xu Xusheng first discovered Erlitou, he suggested that it was Bo, the first capital of the Shang under King Tang in the traditional account. Since the late 1970s, archaeologists in China have tended to identify the site with Zhenxun, the last Xia capital. The traditional account of the overthrow of the Xia by the Shang has been identified with the ends of each of the four phases of the site by different authors. The Xia–Shang–Zhou Chronology Project identified all four phases of Erlitou as Xia, and the construction of the Yanshi walled city as the founding of the Shang. As the period indicated by the Bamboo Annals was longer than the span of the Erlitou culture, the project also assigned the later phases of the Wangwan III variant of the Longshan culture to the Xia period. Other scholars, particularly outside China, point to the lack of any firm evidence for such an identification, and argue that the historiographical focus of Chinese archaeology is unduly limiting.

Archaeological evidence of a large outburst flood at Jishi Gorge that destroyed the Lajia site on the upper reaches of the Yellow River has been dated to about 1920 BC. This date is shortly before the rise of the Erlitou culture in the middle Yellow River valley and the Yueshi culture in Shandong, following the decline of the Longshan culture in the North China Plain. The authors suggest that this flood may have been the basis for the later myth, and contributed to the transition of cultures. They further argue that the timing is further evidence for the identification of the Xia with the Erlitou culture. However, no evidence of contemporaneous widespread flooding in the North China Plain has yet been found.

== See also ==
- List of Neolithic cultures of China
- Three Sovereigns and Five Emperors
