= Yinchuan Township =

Yinchuan Township (simplified Chinese: 银川乡; traditional Chinese: 銀川鄉) may refer to these townships in China:

- Yinchuan Township, Gansu, in Jishishan Bonan, Dongxiang and Salar Autonomous County, Gansu
- Yinchuan Township, Heilongjiang, in Tongjiang, Heilongjiang

== See also ==
- Yinchuan, the capital city of Ningxia
