= Dahejia =

Dahejia 大河家镇
- Town
- Location within Gansu Location within China
- Coordinates: 35°50′10″N 102°45′30″E
- Country: China
- Province: Gansu
- Prefecture-level City: Linxia
- County: Jishishan

Area
  - Total: 52.72 km^{2} (20.36 sq mi)

Population (2008)
  - Total: 28,016

Dahejia Town (大河家镇) is a town under Jishishan County, in Linxia, Gansu. It is located on the south bank of the Yellow River, bordering Qinghai province on what can be considered the boundary between the Loess Plateau and the Tibetan Plateau.

== History ==
The area around Dahejia has been inhabited since 5,000 years ago by the Majiayao culture.

The town has long been the site of the Linjin ferry, an important ferry crossing in the upper reaches of the Yellow River. This also established the town as a trading base on the Silk Road and a military chokepoint. It was a marketplace for tea and horses.

In 1988 a 161 meter long bridge opened, replacing the ferry. A second bridge was built in 2019.

Dahejia town was merged from the former Dahejia township and Shibaozi township.

Dahejia was one of the most severely hit areas by the 2023 Jishishan earthquake, recording 78 deaths and over 5,200 homes becoming inhabitable

== Demographics ==
In 1996, the population was 12,000, of which 42% are Bonan, 31% are Hui, and 7% are Salar people.

== Culture ==
The Bonan minority are known for their saber-crafting.

The Jishi Gorge outburst flood, on which the Great Flood myth was probably based, took place near Dahejia.

== See also ==
- List of township-level divisions of Gansu
