= List of generic Chinese toponyms =

This article lists a number of common generic Chinese toponyms, their meanings, and some examples of their use.

== Adjectives ==
Term	Hanzi	Pinyin	Meaning	Examples	Comments
an	安	ān	calm, peaceful	Anqing, Xi'an	
bai	白	bái	white	Baicheng, Baiyun Mountain	
bei	北	běi	north	Beijing, Hubei	
chang	长; 長	cháng	long	Changchun, Changsha	
da	大	dà	big, great	Daqing, Daxiang District	
dong	东; 東	dōng	east	Guangdong, Shandong	
guang	广; 廣	guǎng	broad	Guang'an, Guangdong	
hei	黑	hēi	black	Heilongjiang, Heishan County	
huang	黄	huáng	yellow	Huanggang, Huangpu District	
jin	金	jīn	golden	Jinchang, Jinhua	
nan	南	nán	south	Hainan, Hunan	
ning	宁; 寧	níng	peaceful	Liaoning, Ningxia	
ping	平	píng	flat, peaceful	Nanping, Pingdingshan	
qing	青	qīng	green, blue	Qingdao, Qinghai Lake	For more information, see Qing (color)
xi	西	xī	west	Shanxi, Xi'an	
xin	新	xīn	new	Xinjiang	
yong	永	yǒng	everlasting, forever	Yongning, Yongzhou	

== Physical objects ==
Term	Hanzi	Pinyin	Meaning	Examples	Comments
chuan	川	chuān	river	Sichuan, Yichuan County	
dao	岛; 島	dǎo	island	Qingdao, Qinhuangdao	
gou	沟; 溝	gōu	ditch	Mentougou District, Qiaogou Subdistrict	
guan	关; 關	guān	mountain pass	Jiayuguan, Shaoguan	
hai	海	hǎi	sea	Hainan, Shanghai	
he	河	hé	river	Hebei, Qitaihe	
jiang	江	jiāng	river	Jiangsu, Zhanjiang	
lin	林	lín	forest	Guilin, Yulin	
liu	柳	liǔ	willow	Liugou Township, Liuzhou	
men	门; 門	mén	gate, door	Jiangmen, Xiamen	
qiao	桥; 橋	qiáo	bridge	Shuangqiao District, Qiaodong District	
quan	泉	quán	spring	Jiuquan, Quanzhou	
sha	沙	shā	sand	Changsha, Sansha	
shan	山	shān	mountain	Ma'anshan, Shandong	
shi	石	shí	stone	Huangshi, Shitai County	
xi	溪	xī	stream, brook	Benxi, Yuxi	
yang	阳; 陽	yáng	sun	Fuyang, Nanyang	
ying	营; 營	yíng	barracks	Dongying, Yingkou	
zhai	寨	zhài	stockade, fort, village	Dazhai, Xiazhai	

== Other ==
Term	Hanzi	Pinyin	Meaning	Examples	Comments
cheng	城	chéng	city	Fangchenggang, Xuancheng	
jing	京	jīng	capital city	Beijing, Nanjing	
kou	口	kǒu	mouth	Yingkou, Zhangjiakou	
long	龙; 龍	lóng	dragon	Heilongjiang, Longyan	
ma	马; 馬	mǎ	horse	Ma'anshan, Maguan County	
qing	庆; 慶	qìng	celebration	Anqing, Chongqing	
tun	屯	tún	village	Liulintun Township, Sanlitun Subdistrict	
wang	王	wáng	king, prince	Wangfujing, Wanghe	
zhen	镇; 鎮	zhèn	town	Jingdezhen, Zhenjiang	
zhou	州	zhōu	zhou	Fuzhou, Hangzhou	A type of historical administrative division
zhuang	庄; 莊	zhuāng	village	Shijiazhuang, Zaozhuang	
