= Gangcha Township, Qinghai =

Gangca Tibetan Township 岗察藏族乡 རྐང་ཚ་བོད་རིགས་ཞང་། Gangcha
- Ethnic township
- Location in Qinghai
- Coordinates: 35°41′59″N 102°13′50″E
- Country: China
- Province: Qinghai
- Prefecture-level city: Haidong
- Autonomous County: Xunhua

Area
  - Total: 266.6 km^{2} (102.9 sq mi)

Population (2010)
  - Total: 1,912
  - Density: 7.172/km^{2} (18.57/sq mi)
- Time zone: UTC+8 (China Standard)
- Local dialing code: 972

Gangca Tibetan Township (Tibetan: རྐང་ཚ་བོད་རིགས་ཞང་།, Chinese: 岗察藏族乡) or Gangcha Township, is an ethnic township in Xunhua Salar Autonomous County, Haidong, Qinghai, China. In 2010, Gangca Township had a total population of 1,912: 999 males and 913 females: 505 aged under 14, 1,289 aged between 15 and 65 and 118 aged over 65.
