= Galeng Township, Qinghai =

Garing Tibetan Township 尕楞藏族乡 ཀ་རིང་བོད་རིགས་ཞང་། Galeng
- Ethnic township
- Location in Qinghai
- Coordinates: 35°45′45″N 102°16′30″E
- Country: China
- Province: Qinghai
- Prefecture-level city: Haidong
- Autonomous County: Xunhua

Area
  - Total: 184.5 km^{2} (71.2 sq mi)

Population (2010)
  - Total: 5,169
  - Density: 28.02/km^{2} (72.56/sq mi)
- Time zone: UTC+8 (China Standard)
- Local dialing code: 972

Garing Tibetan Township (Tibetan: ཀ་རིང་བོད་རིགས་ཞང་།, Chinese: 尕楞藏族乡) or Galeng Township, is an ethnic township in Xunhua Salar Autonomous County, Haidong, Qinghai, China. In 2010, Galeng Township had a total population of 5,169: 2,599 males and 2,570 females: 1,315 aged under 14, 3,457 aged between 15 and 65 and 397 aged over 65.
