= Xunhua Incident =

Uprising against the policies of the Chinese Communist Party

- Part of Great Leap Forward in China
- Native name: 循化事件
- Location: China
- Date: April 1958
- Target: Chinese Communist Party (CCP) officials, rebels
- Attack type: uprising and its suppression
- Deaths: 437 civilians, 17 People's Liberation Army (PLA) soldiers
- Perpetrators: Rebels, PLA
- Motive: opposition to CCP policies

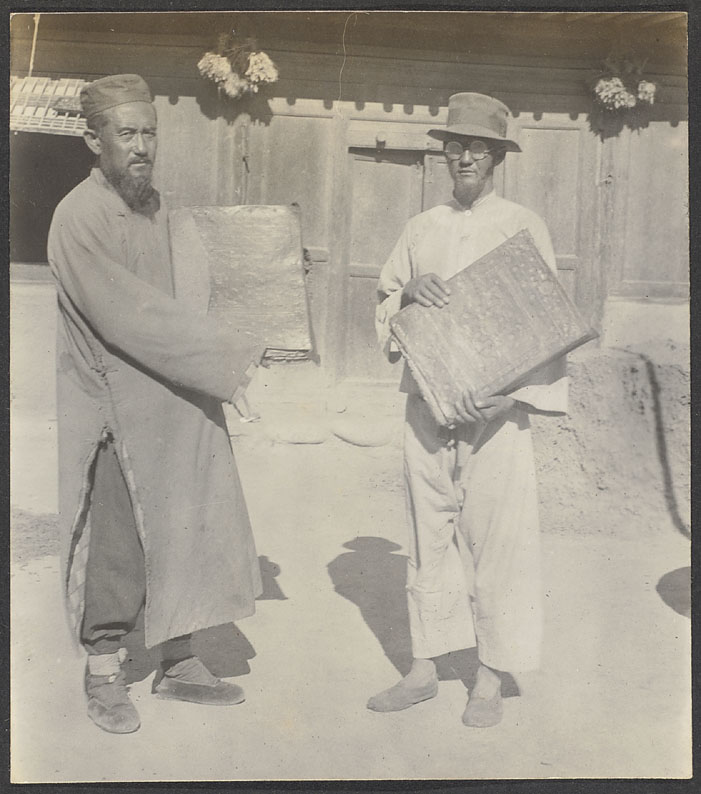
Salar Muslims holding Qurans.

The Xunhua Incident (Chinese: 循化事件) was an uprising of Salars and Tibetans against the policies of the Chinese Communist Party (CCP) in Qinghai, China in April 1958. It took place in the Xunhua Salar Autonomous County, hometown of the 10th Panchen Lama, during the Great Leap Forward. In March 1958, local officials imposed strict rules for socialist transformations. To prevent uprisings, religious leaders such as Jnana Pal Rinpoche (加乃化仁波切), a well-respected monk, were forcibly sent for re-education. Over 4,000 people with different ethnic backgrounds subsequently revolted and killed a team leader from the CCP task force. The uprising ended after the People's Liberation Army massacred 435 people, most of whom were unarmed civilians, on April 25, and 2,499 more rioters were arrested.

== Historical background ==
Under the leadership of Mao Zedong, the Chinese Communist Party (CCP) launched the Anti-rightist Campaign in 1957 and the Great Leap Forward in 1958. Local leaders in Qinghai Province thus intended to achieve the goals of "socialist revolution" as well as "democratic revolution" in a fast pace.

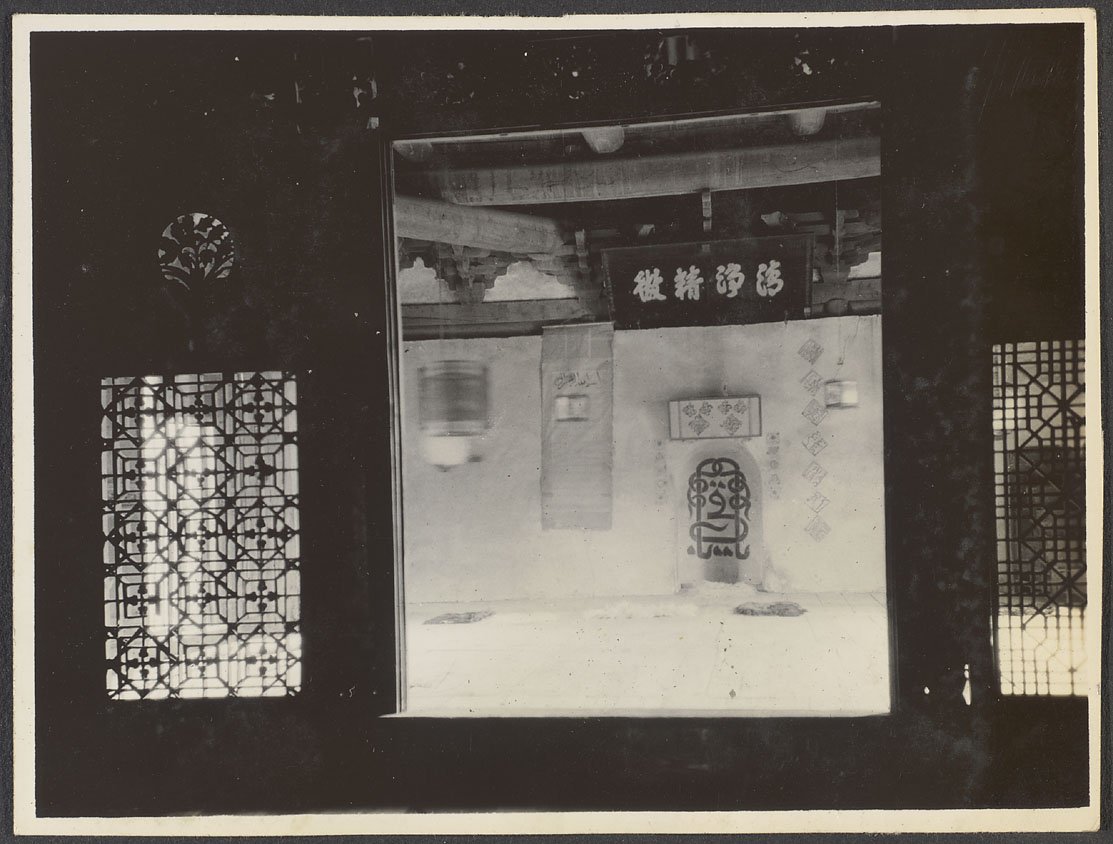
Prayer hall of Salar Mosque near Jishi (积石镇) of Xunhua, Qinghai.

In March 1958, Zhu Xiafu (朱侠夫), the vice secretary of CCP committee in Qinghai, called on fast socialist transformations of nomads and set quota for different areas, forcibly establishing the socialist cooperatives for animal husbandry. At the same time, in order to "prevent uprising", leaders in Qinghai followed the directive of the Central Committee of CCP and began to "use meetings and study sessions to rein in the minority religious leaders". Jnana Pal Rinpoche (加乃化仁波切), a prestigious monk from Bimdo Monastery (温都寺) who was a vice administrator of Xunhua County and had taught Dalai Lama and Panchen Lama, was among the religious leaders sent for re-education.

== Uprising ==
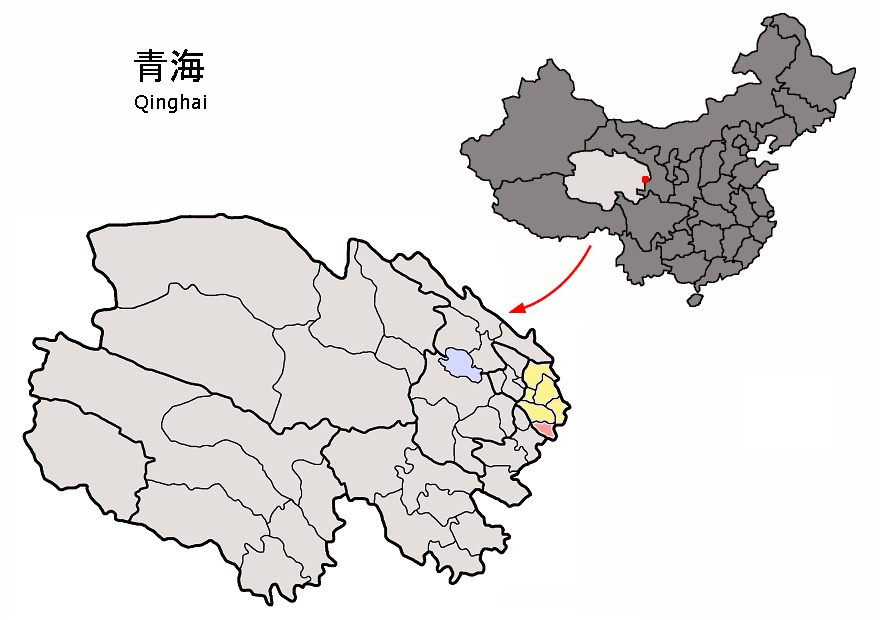
Xunhua Salar Autonomous County

On April 17, 1958, a group of civilians from Gangca Town resisted the socialist cooperatives and demanded the release of Jnana Pal Rinpoche. They detained the CCP secretary of Gangca Town, cutting down utility poles, and on the next day their protests turned violent, resulting in the death of a team leader from the CCP task force.

The resistance was joined by local Salar people, and on April 24, over 4,000 people led by the Salar besieged Xunhua County. Some of the stores were robbed and several local officials were beaten. However, the armed resistance fled the area during the night.

== Suppression and fatalities ==
On the morning of April 25, People's Liberation Army (PLA) sent two regiments to suppress the uprising. Upon arrival, the PLA troops started to open fire towards the civilians who demanded the release of Jnana Pal Rinpoche. Within four hours, the troops realized the civilians were mostly unarmed, but had already killed 435 people, with a total casualties of 719. On the afternoon of April 25, a total of 2,499 were arrested, including 1,581 Salars, 537 Tibetans, 343 Hui people and 38 Han Chinese. Official sources state that the death toll within PLA troops was 17, in addition to an estimated loss of properties worth 0.9 million RMB at the time.

Jnana Pal Rinpoche committed suicide in the "study session" after hearing the news, and he was "identified" by officials as the organizer of the uprising.

Mao Zedong later expressed support for the crackdown in Qinghai, stating that "the uprising of counter-revolutionaries in Qinghai was wonderful, as it was an opportunity for the liberation of working people, and the decision of the CCP committee in Qinghai was absolutely correct".

== See also ==
- Anti-rightist Campaign
- Great Leap Forward
- 1959 Tibetan uprising
- List of massacres in China
- History of the People's Republic of China
- Shadian incident
