= Jishishan Bonan, Dongxiang and Salar Autonomous County =

Jishishan Bonan, Dongxiang and Salar Autonomous County 积石山保安族东乡族撒拉族自治县
- Autonomous county
- 积石山保安族东乡族撒拉族自治县
- Location of the county seat in Gansu
- Coordinates: 35°43′03″N 102°52′39″E
- Country: China
- Province: Gansu
- Autonomous prefecture: Linxia
- County seat: Chuimatan (吹麻滩镇)

Area
  - Total: 909.97 km^{2} (351.34 sq mi)
- Highest elevation: 4,308 m (14,134 ft)
- Lowest elevation: 1,787 m (5,863 ft)

Population (2020 census)
  - Total: 239,390
  - Density: 263.07/km^{2} (681.36/sq mi)
- Time zone: UTC+8 (China Standard)
- Postal code: 731700
- Area code: 0930
- Website: jss.gov.cn

Jishishan Bonan, Dongxiang and Salar Autonomous County
- Simplified Chinese: 积石山保安族东乡族撒拉族自治县
- Traditional Chinese: 積石山保安族東鄉族撒拉族自治縣
Transcriptions
Standard Mandarin
- Hanyu Pinyin: Jīshíshān Bǎoānzú Dōngxiāngzú Sālāzú Zìzhìxiàn
other Mandarin
- Xiao'erjing: ڭِ‌شِ‌شًا بَوْاًزُو دْوثِيَانْ‌زُو سَالَازُو زِجِ‌ثِيًا

Jishishan County
- Simplified Chinese: 积石山县
- Traditional Chinese: 積石山縣
Transcriptions
Standard Mandarin
- Hanyu Pinyin: Jīshíshān Xiàn

Jishishan Bonan, Dongxiang and Salar Autonomous County (Note: Chinese: 积石山保安族东乡族撒拉族自治县; pinyin: Jīshíshān Bǎoānzú Dōngxiāngzú Sālāzú Zìzhìxiàn) is an autonomous county of Linxia Hui Autonomous Prefecture, in Gansu province, China. It is located in the mostly mountainous area to the south of the Yellow River, near Gansu's border with Qinghai province. The total population was 239,390 in 2020; 64.9% were of an ethnic minority. The county's titular ethnic groups are the Bonan, Dongxiang, and Salar peoples. There are 21,400 Bonan people living in Jishishan, which accounts for 95% of all Bonan in China. The Bonan are known for their cultivation of Sichuan peppers and walnuts. Jishishan's local cuisine includes Bonan-style maisui baozi and lamb meat.

== History ==
The area of present-day Jishishan County was formerly inhabited by the Qiang and the Xirong peoples.

During the Warring States period, the Qin annexed the territory of present-day Jishishan County. In 278 BC, it was incorporated into the Longxi Commandery as Fuhan County (Chinese: 枹罕县; pinyin: Fúhǎn Xiàn). This organizational structure continued into the Western Han.

In 81 BC, Longxi Commandery was reorganized as Jincheng Commandery, and Fuhan County was placed under its jurisdiction. In 60 BC, the county was reorganized as Heguan County (Chinese: 河关县; pinyin: Héguān Xiàn).

During the Eastern Han, under the Liang Province Governor's Department, the area was reorganized under the jurisdiction of Fuhan County and Heguan County. In 36 AD, Jincheng Commandery was merged into Longxi Commandery.

In 184 AD, Song Jian led local Qiang forces to rebel against the Han dynasty during the Liang Province rebellion. Song Jian ruled over the area for the subsequent 30 years. Song Jian's reign ended in 214 AD, when Cao Cao successfully sent general Xiahou Yuan to re-establish Han dynasty control over the area.

Following the fall of the Han dynasty, the area of present-day Jishishan fell under the jurisdiction of Cao Wei.

After the Cao Wei, the area was incorporated into the Western Jin under the Qín Prefecture. Around 301–302 AD, Liang Province governor Zhang Gui carved out a portion of Xiping Commandery to establish Jinxing Commandery, which governed the area. Within Jinxing Commandery, present-day Jishishan County was organized as Linjin County (Chinese: 临津县; pinyin: Línjīn Xiàn).

=== Sixteen Kingdoms period ===
During the subsequent Sixteen Kingdoms period, the area of present-day Jishishan County changed hands frequently. It was first conquered by the Former Liang, then by the Han-Zhao, then by the Later Zhao, then the Former Qin, then the Later Qin, then the Western Qin, and finally the Later Liang. In 412 AD, it was brought into the folds of the Northern Wei, which organized it as part of the Jianchang Commandery. Upon the collapse of the Western Qin in 431 AD, the area was conquered by the Tuyuhun. In 445 AD, it was reconquered by the Northern Wei. Following the collapse of the Northern Wei, the area was a part of the short-lived Western Wei. In 546, under the Western Wei, He Province governor Yang Kuan reorganized the area as Fenglin County. During the Northern Zhou, the area was split between Fenglin County and Fuhan County.

=== Sui dynasty ===
In the early parts of the subsequent Sui dynasty, the area belonged to the Fuhan Commandery. The Fuhan Commandery was transferred to the jurisdiction of He Province in 583, and then abolished altogether in 607, and replaced by Linjing County.

=== Tang dynasty ===
The Tang dynasty established control over the area in 619 AD, and placed it under the jurisdiction of He Province. In 631, the area was included in the newly established Mi Province, which was abolished in 636 AD, and replaced with Michuan County (Chinese: 米川县; pinyin: Mǐchuān Xiàn), which fell under the jurisdiction of He Province. The following year, part of the area was included in the newly established Anxiang County (Chinese: 安乡县; pinyin: Ānxiāng Xiàn). In 655, Michuan County was moved north, and in 676 AD, Anxiang County was moved west. Following these changes, the area of present-day Jishishan County was divided between Anxiang County and Fuhan County. Later, the area was assigned to the Longyou Jiedushi, a form of military government. In 742, Anxiang County was replaced by Fenglin County, which was placed under the jurisdiction of Anxiang Commandery, in He Province.

=== Tibetan Empire and Song dynasty ===
In 762, the area was conquered by the Tibetan Empire. In 848, Tang dynasty general Zhang Yichao led a rebellion against the Tibetan Empire, and briefly conquered the area of He Province. The Tibetan Empire regained control of it shortly thereafter. The area belonged to the Tibetan Empire until the late 11th century, when general Wang Shao conquered the area for the Song dynasty. It was reincorporated as part of He Province.

=== Jin dynasty ===
The area was then conquered by the Jin dynasty in 1131. Under the Jin dynasty, the area became part of the newly formed Jishi Prefecture.

=== Mongol Empire ===
In 1226, the Mongol Empire conquered the Western Xia, and conquered He Province and Jishi Prefecture.

=== Yuan dynasty ===
In the subsequent Mongol-led Yuan dynasty, the area was incorporated as part of Gongchang Circuit (Chinese: 巩昌路; pinyin: Gǒngchāng Lù). In 1269, He Province was replaced by Hezhou Circuit (Chinese: 河州路; pinyin: Hézhōu Lù).

=== Ming dynasty ===
The area was conquered by Ming dynasty general Deng Yu in 1370. It was placed under military governance the following year. The area's government organized it using the lijia system. Civil governance was installed in 1373, and the area was organized as Anxiang County, which was under the jurisdiction of Hezhou Fu (Chinese: 河州府; pinyin: Hézhōu Fǔ). In 1473, He Province was re-established.

=== Qing dynasty ===
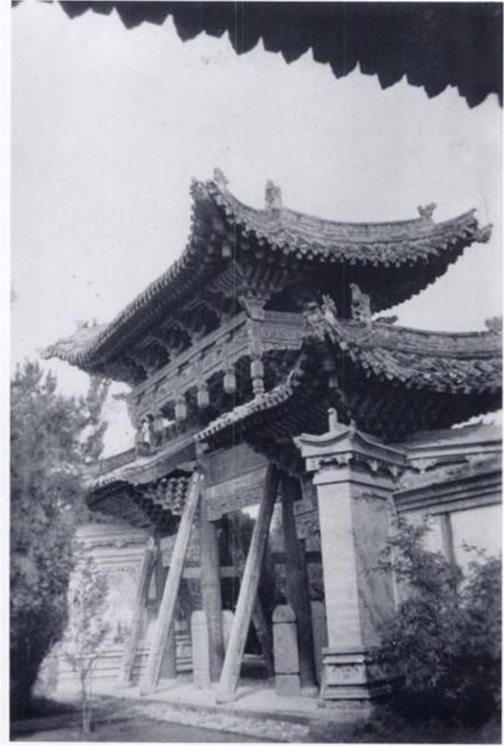
A paifang in honor of Ma Anliang located in Jishishan County, photographed in 1933

In the early Qing dynasty, He Province was put under the jurisdiction of Lintao Fu. The local government stopped using the lijia system in 1705, and replaced it with the huishe system (Chinese: 会社制; pinyin: huìshè zhì). In 1762, He Province was revoked, and replaced with Xunhua Subprefecture.

=== Republic of China ===
Upon the establishment of the Republic of China in 1912, the area was reorganized as Lanshan Circuit, in Gansu province. In 1913, Lintao Fu was abolished, and the area was reorganized as Daohe County (Chinese: 导河县; pinyin: Dǎohé Xiàn). In 1929, Daohe County was reorganized as Linxia County. Following this change, the area of present-day Jishishan County was split between Linxia County and nearby Xunhua County.

=== People's Republic of China ===
In August 1949, the area was captured by the People's Liberation Army, and became part of the People's Republic of China.

At the end of 1958, Linxia County was merged into the city of Linxia, although this would be reverted in 1961.

On 14 June 1980, Jishishan Bonan, Dongxiang and Salar Autonomous County was established.

Jishishan County was the site of the epicenter of an earthquake which killed 146 people on 18 December 2023.

== Administrative divisions ==
Jishishan County administers 7 towns and 10 townships.

=== Towns ===
Jishishan County administers the following 7 towns:

- Chuimatan (吹麻滩镇) – the county seat
- Dahejia (大河家镇)
- Juji (居集镇)
- Biezang (癿藏镇)
- Shiyuan (石塬镇)
- Anji (安集镇)
- Yinchuan (银川镇)

=== Townships ===
Jishishan County administers the following 10 townships:

- Liuji Township (刘集乡)
- Liugou Township (柳沟乡)
- Guanjiachuan Township (关家川乡)
- Hulinjia Township (胡林家乡)
- Zhaizigou Township(寨子沟乡)
- Guogan Township (郭干乡)
- Xuhujia Township (徐扈家乡)
- Zhongjuling Township (中咀岭乡)
- Xiaoguan Township (小关乡)
- Puchuan Township (铺川镇)
