= Baizhuang, Qinghai =

Baizhuang 白庄镇
- Town
- Baizhuangzhen
- Location in Qinghai
- Coordinates: 35°43′17″N 102°34′25″E
- Country: China
- Province: Qinghai
- Prefecture-level city: Haidong
- Autonomous County: Xunhua

Area
  - Total: 162.5 km^{2} (62.7 sq mi)

Population (2010)
  - Total: 20,919
  - Density: 128.7/km^{2} (333.4/sq mi)
- Time zone: UTC+8 (China Standard)
- Local dialing code: 972

Baizhuang (Chinese: 白庄镇) is a town in Xunhua Salar Autonomous County, Haidong, Qinghai, China. In 2010, Baizhuang had a total population of 20,919 people: 10,516 males and 10,403 females: 6,058 under 14 years old, 13,419 aged between 15 and 64 and 1,442 over 65 years old.
