= Daowei Tibetan Ethnic Township =

Dobi Tibetan Township 道纬藏族乡 རྡོ་སྦིས་བོད་རིགས་ཞང་། Daowei
- Ethnic township
- Location in Qinghai
- Coordinates: 35°39′0″N 102°38′40″E
- Country: China
- Province: Qinghai
- Prefecture-level city: Haidong
- Autonomous County: Xunhua
- Administrative villages: 27

Area
  - Total: 606.7 km^{2} (234.2 sq mi)

Population (2018)
  - Total: 13,614
  - Density: 22.44/km^{2} (58.12/sq mi)
- Time zone: UTC+8 (China Standard)
- Local dialing code: 972

Dobi Tibetan Ethnic Township (Tibetan: རྡོ་སྦིས་བོད་རིགས་ཞང་།, simplified Chinese: 道帏藏族乡; traditional Chinese: 道幃藏族鄉; pinyin: Dàowéi Zàngzú Xiāng) or Daowei Township, is an ethnic township in Xunhua Salar Autonomous County, Haidong, Qinghai, China. The ethnic township is located 35 kilometres (22 mi) to the southeast of the autonomous county's seat of government. Dobi Tibetan Ethnic Township spans an area of 606.7 square kilometres (234.2 mi^{2}), and has a hukou population of 13,614 people as of 2018.

== Geography ==
Dobi Tibetan Ethnic Township is located within the southeast of Xunhua Salar Autonomous County, within the prefecture-level city of Haidong. The ethnic township is largely mountainous, with an average elevation of 2,620 metres (8,600 ft) above sea level, and grassy mountains covering 880,000 mu of Dobi. The ethnic township has 32,900 mu of arable land.

== Administrative divisions ==
Dobi Tibetan Ethnic Township administers 27 administrative villages (Chinese: 行政村; pinyin: Xíngzhèng Cūn), and 34 natural villages (Chinese: 自然村; pinyin: Zìrán Cūn), although the latter have no formal status. The ethnic township's 27 administrative villages are as follows:

- Gulei Village (Chinese: 古雷村)
- Qitaibao Village (Chinese: 起台堡村)
- Helongbao Village (Chinese: 贺龙堡村)
- Bilong Village (Chinese: 比隆村)
- Hetang Village (Chinese: 贺塘村)
- Hezhuang Village (Chinese: 贺庄村)
- Ningba Village (Chinese: 宁巴村)
- Zhangsha Village (Chinese: 张沙村)
- Duowa Village (Chinese: 多哇村)
- Duoshize Village (Chinese: 多什则村)
- Ejia Village (Chinese: 俄家村)
- Wumandao Village (Chinese: 吾曼道村)
- Lake Village (Chinese: 拉科村)
- Lamulongwa Village (Chinese: 拉木龙哇村)
- Deman Village (Chinese: 德曼村)
- Xunwa Village (Chinese: 循哇村)
- Lilun Village (Chinese: 立伦村)
- Wangjia Village (Chinese: 王家村)
- Sanmucang Village (Chinese: 三木仓村)
- Danma Village (Chinese: 旦麻村)
- Jiacang Village (Chinese: 加仓村)
- Muhong Village (Chinese: 木洪村)
- Yamu Village (Chinese: 牙木村)
- Tiegaleng Village (Chinese: 铁尕楞村)
- Wuman Village (Chinese: 吾曼村)
- Kema Village (Chinese: 克麻村)
- Xichong Village (Chinese: 夕冲村)

== Demographics ==
As of 2018, Dobi Tibetan Ethnic Township has a population of 13,614 people.

In 2010, the ethnic township had a total population of 11,635 people: 5,774 males and 5,861 females: 2,868 under 14 years old, 7,836 aged between 15 and 64 and 931 over 65 years old.

Tibetans comprise the main population group in the ethnic township, although there are also sizeable Salar, Hui, and Han populations.

== Culture ==
The ethnic township has a memorial hall devoted to Tibetan religious teacher and politician Geshe Sherab Gyatso, who was born in the area.

Dobi Tibetan Ethnic Township claims to be the origin of two styles of Tibetan ethnic drumming: Chi Drumming (Chinese: 螭鼓舞; pinyin: Chī Gǔwǔ) and Xia'erqun Drumming (simplified Chinese: 夏尔群鼓舞; traditional Chinese: 夏爾群鼓舞; pinyin: Xià'ěrqún Gǔwǔ). Chi Drumming is included in the Chinese government's List of National Intangible Cultural Heritage Representatives, whereas Xia'erqun Drumming is included in the Qinghai provincial Provincial Intangible Cultural Heritage List.
