= Wendu Township, Qinghai =

Windo Tibetan Township 文都藏族乡 བིས་མདོ་བོད་རིགས་ཞང་། Wendu
- Ethnic township
- Location in Qinghai
- Coordinates: 35°46′43″N 102°23′28″E
- Country: China
- Province: Qinghai
- Prefecture-level city: Haidong
- Autonomous County: Xunhua

Area
  - Total: 224.7 km^{2} (86.8 sq mi)

Population (2010)
  - Total: 8,677
  - Density: 38.62/km^{2} (100.0/sq mi)
- Time zone: UTC+8 (China Standard)
- Postal code: 811301
- Local dialing code: 972

Windo Tibetan Township (Tibetan: བིས་མདོ་བོད་རིགས་ཞང་།, Chinese: 文都藏族乡) or Wendu Township, is an ethnic township in Xunhua Salar Autonomous County, Haidong, Qinghai, China. In 2010, Windo had a total population of 8,677 people: 4,463 males and 4,214 females: 1,913 under 14 years old, 6,173 aged between 15 and 64 and 586 over 65 years old.
