= Liugou Township =

Liugou Township 柳沟乡
- Township
- Location in Gansu
- Coordinates: 35°44′37″N 102°51′14″E
- Country: People's Republic of China
- Province: Gansu
- Autonomous prefecture: Linxia Hui Autonomous Prefecture
- Autonomous county: Jishishan Bonan, Dongxiang and Salar Autonomous County
- Time zone: UTC+8 (China Standard)

Liugou Township (simplified Chinese: 柳沟乡; traditional Chinese: 柳溝鄉; pinyin: Liǔgōu Xiāng) is a township under the administration of Jishishan Bonan, Dongxiang and Salar Autonomous County, Gansu, China. As of 2022, it has 9 villages under its administration.

The name "Liugou" means ditch with willow trees in Chinese. There are many willow trees growing in the ditch where the village is located, hence the name Liugou.

Liugou was the epicenter of the 2023 Jishishan earthquake, which killed at least 148 people.

== History ==
In August 2018, a flood hit Liugou Township, resulting in over 400 people being displaced from the villages of Xietao, Majia, and Liugou within the township.

Liugou was named by Chinese authorities to be the epicenter of the 2023 Jishishan earthquake, which killed at least 148 people.

== Administrative divisions ==
As of 2022, it has the following 9 villages under its administration:

- Xietao Village (Chinese: 斜套村)
- Gaji Village (Chinese: 尕集村)
- Yuanjiashan Village (Chinese: 袁家山村)
- Yangshan Village (Chinese: 阳山村)
- Liugou Village (Chinese: 柳沟村)
- Majia Village (Chinese: 马家村)
- Zhangguojia Village (Chinese: 张郭家村)
- Shangping Village (Chinese: 上坪村)
- Fanjiagou Village (Chinese: 樊家沟村)

== See also ==
- List of township-level divisions of Gansu
