= Yinchuan Township, Gansu =

Yinchuan Township 银川乡
- Township
- Location in Gansu
- Coordinates: 35°40′43″N 103°4′17″E
- Country: People's Republic of China
- Province: Gansu
- Autonomous prefecture: Linxia Hui Autonomous Prefecture
- Autonomous county: Jishishan Bonan, Dongxiang and Salar Autonomous County
- Time zone: UTC+8 (China Standard)

Yinchuan Township (simplified Chinese: 银川乡; traditional Chinese: 銀川鄉; pinyin: Yínchuān Xiāng) is a township under the administration of Jishishan Bonan, Dongxiang and Salar Autonomous County, Gansu, China. As of 2018, it has 12 villages under its administration.

== See also ==
- List of township-level divisions of Gansu
