= National Catalogue of Precious Ancient Books =

Historical archive of Chinese anicent texts

The National Catalogue of Precious Ancient Books (simplified Chinese: 国家珍贵古籍名录; traditional Chinese: 國家珍貴古籍名錄; pinyin: Guójiā zhēnguì gǔjí mínglù) is a register compiled by the Chinese government to establish a comprehensive archive of valuable ancient books, ensure their security, promote the protection of ancient books, raise public awareness about their preservation, and facilitate international cultural exchange and cooperation. The list is drafted by the Ministry of Culture and Tourism and published upon approval by the State Council. It primarily includes books written or printed before 1912, preserved in a traditional Chinese way, and possessing significant historical, ideological, and cultural value. Some books in minority languages and scripts are also included.

As of November 2020, China had a total of 13,026 nationally valuable ancient books.

== Lists ==
- I (2,392 numbers, 2008)
- II (4,478 numbers, 2009)
- III (2,989 numbers, 2010)
- IV (1,516 numbers, 2013)
- V (899 numbers, 2016)
- VI (752 numbers, 2020)

== See also ==
- National priority protected site
- Intangible cultural heritage
