= Qingshui Township, Qinghai =

Qingshui Township 清水乡
- Township
- Qingshuixiang
- Location in Qinghai
- Coordinates: 35°50′12″N 102°32′49″E
- Country: China
- Province: Qinghai
- Prefecture-level city: Haidong
- Autonomous County: Xunhua

Area
  - Total: 239.8 km^{2} (92.6 sq mi)

Population (2010)
  - Total: 13,545
  - Density: 56.48/km^{2} (146.3/sq mi)
- Time zone: UTC+8 (China Standard)
- Postal code: 811100
- Local dialing code: 972

Qingshui Township (Chinese: 清水乡) is a township in Xunhua Salar Autonomous County, Haidong, Qinghai, China. In 2010, Qingshui Township had a total population of 13,545 people: 6,656 males and 6,889 females: 3,822 under 14 years old, 8,897 aged between 15 and 64 and 826 over 65 years old.
