= Jishi Gorge outburst flood =

Natural disaster in ancient China

The Jishi Gorge Outburst Flood was a natural disaster that occurred around 1920 BC in what is now China. There is a theory in which the water flow during the eruption was one of the largest fresh water flows to occur in the Holocene and caused widespread flooding around the Yellow River, affecting everyone living in the river basin. The flood outbreak was triggered by the bursting of a dam caused by landslides after an earthquake. The Lajia archaeological site, downstream of the Jishi Gorge, was first destroyed by the earthquake and later covered by sediments from the flood eruption.

== The course ==
The Jishi Gorge (积石峡) leads the Yellow River from the river area around Xunhua in the west through the Jishi Mountain and further east to the river area around the Guanting Basin. An earthquake triggered landslides and rock avalanches that dammed the Yellow River in Jishi Gorge west of what is now Mengda township (孟达乡) in Xunhua County, eastern Qinghai, near the border of Gansu around 100 kilometres west of Lanzhou. The dam after the earthquake extended 1.3 km in the direction of the river's flow and its highest level was 240 meters above today's water level. Upstream at Xunhua, a dammed lake filled after the river was blocked at the Jishi Gorge dam.

After less than a year, probably after about six to nine months, the water level approached the top of the dam. In the end, the dam could not withstand the large water masses, and the flood outbreak was triggered when the dam broke. The dammed river basin at Guanting is estimated to have had a level approximately up to 160 or 200 meters above today's water level at the time of the eruption. When the dam broke, the water level in the dammed lake dropped more than 100 meters and released 12 to 16 cubic kilometers of water. Calculations based on both the volume of water and its head in the impoundment area at Xunhua, and also reconstructed cross-sections of the floodplain at Guanting estimate the peak flow at the outlet to be approximately 480,000 cubic meters per second, which is more than 500 times the current flow of the Yellow River at the Jishi Gorge. This is one of the largest known fresh water flows to have occurred during the Holocene.

== Effects of the flood ==
The flood breached the Yellow River's natural levees and caused widespread flooding, which also potentially changed the course of the Yellow River and had a major impact on all communities along the Yellow River's reach. After the primary flood, prolonged secondary floods likely occurred. The flood may have affected 2,000 kilometers downstream of the Yellow River.

Flood sediments downstream of the dam are found at levels 7 to 50 meters above the present water level. The sediments consist exclusively of angular clasts of greenschist and purple-brown mudrock sourced from Jishi Gorge. At the outlet of the gorge, the sediment layer is 20 meters thick and contains stones up to two meters in diameter.

Finds at the archaeological site of Lajia located 25 kilometers downstream from the dam show the devastation following the earthquake and then the flood, which together completely destroyed the settlement. The site was covered by up to 38 meters thick layer of flood sediments from the eruption. In the archaeological excavation, skeletons have been found inside terraced houses whose positions show people helping each other before they died, and some adults died with children in their arms.

== Dating ==
The damming and flood outbreak occurred during the Qijia culture archaeological period. Radiocarbon dating from Lajia date the eruption rounded to 1920 BC. The measurements were made, among other things, on skeletal parts of human victims after their dwellings collapsed during the earthquake. With a margin of error, measurements gave the date 1922±28 BC.

== In mythology ==
The flood is suggested by scientists such as Qinglong Wu to possibly be the disaster that gave rise to the Gun-Yu flood myth, which preceded the establishment of the Xia dynasty.

The historical chronicles the Book of Documents and the Records of the Grand Historian describe a great and devastating flood of the Yellow River that the Taotang and Youyu clans failed to controlled, despite sending several individuals, such as Gun, Earl of Chong, to do so. Gun's son, Yu the Great, would eventually control it after being sent by Emperor Shun. After Yu solved the problem of the flood, the Xia Dynasty was established, which is China's first dynasty. The flood of the Jishi Gorge has great similarities to the great flood described in the chronicles. In both the Book of Documents and Records of the Grand Historian, it is described that the place where Yu began to fight the river was "Jishi" (積石 / 积石) (literally translated 'amassed stones') which is the same name as the modern gorge.

This theory is considered controversial, as the size and scale of the flood does not match the description given in traditional accounts of the great flood, and it would postdate the traditional dates given for the Xia dynasty by several centuries. Additionally, the ruins said to have been destroyed by the flood appear to have been destroyed around 2,000 years prior to the flood itself.

== Controversy ==
The outburst flood theory was put forward in 2016, referencing the Lajia architectural site. However, other scholars found error with their conclusions, pointing out that the Lajia disaster took place over a hundred years after the 1920 BC earthquake, and that the lake that is supposed to have burst to produce this flood ceased to exist nearly 2,000 years prior.

More recent research on the Lajia disaster suggest that localized flash flooding and severe mudflows could have been the cause of the disaster, rather than an outburst flood.
