= Lajia =

Archaeological site in Qinghai, China

- 喇家 (Japanese)
- Lajia Ruins
- Location within Qinghai province Lajia (Qinghai)
- 35.86405°N 102.81025°E
- Cultures: Qijia
- Location: China
- Region: Qinghai

History
- Event(s): Earthquake; Mudslide; Flood

Site notes
- Excavation dates: 1999, 2000, 2001, 2002, 2003, 2004
- Management: Lajia Site Museum

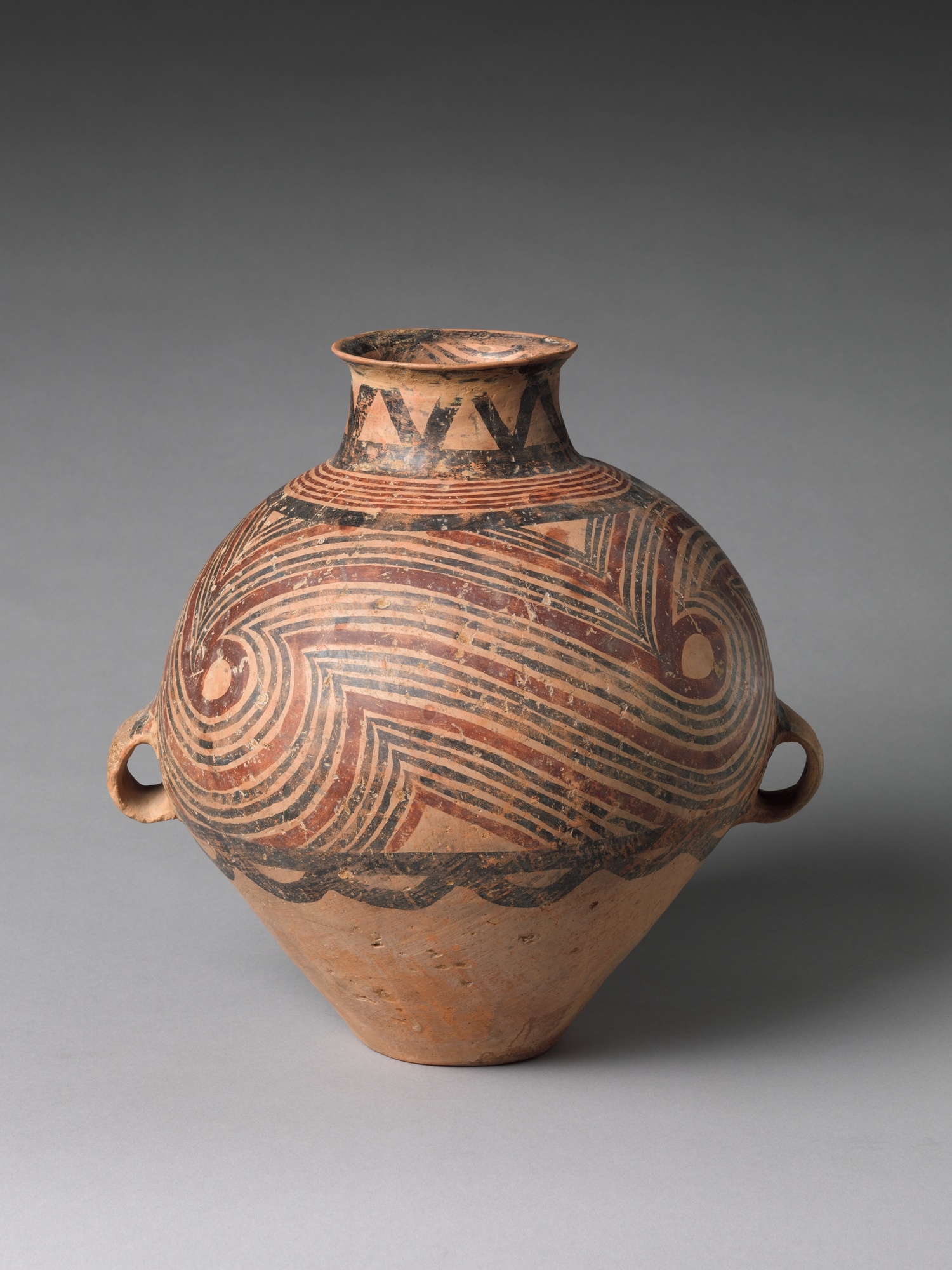
An ancient Chinese pot similar to those found at the Lajia site and those of the Qijia culture

Lajia (Chinese: 喇家; pinyin: Lǎjiā) is a Bronze Age archaeological site in the upper reaches of the Yellow River, on the border between the Chinese provinces of Gansu and Qinghai. As at other sites of the Qijia culture (c. 2300–1500 BCE), the people of Lajia had an agricultural economy based primarily on millet cultivation and sheep herding. They also kept pigs for use in ritual activities, including making oracle bones, and experimented with a high temperature-fired pottery described as proto-porcelain. The world's oldest known noodles were discovered at the site in 2005.

A natural disaster buried the site and killed many of its inhabitants in around 1920 BCE, but archaeologists continue to debate the exact cause of the catastrophe.

== Background ==
Lajia is associated with the Qijia culture, an archaeological culture of northwestern China dated to the late Neolithic and early Bronze Age periods (c. 2300–1500 BCE). Excavations at the site have unearthed various Qijia artifacts, including pottery, rings, stone, weapons and jade flakes. Its moat is also typical of Qijia sites. Some metal artifacts from Qijia sites are similar in style to finds from Central Asia and Siberia, suggesting frequent contact and cultural interactions.

For most of the Qijia period, the Guanting Basin was relatively warm and moist. The staple cereal crop of the Qijia culture was millet, which requires high rainfall and temperature to grow. A significant decrease in mean annual precipitation and mean annual temperature occurred between 1800 and 1400 BCE. This coincided with the demise of the Qijia culture, perhaps because their reliance on millet cultivation meant they could not adapt to the changing climate.

== Finds ==
The world's oldest known noodles have been found at Lajia. The thin yellow strands were found in an upturned pot in 2005 and radiocarbon dated to around 4,000 years ago (c. 2000 BCE). They were originally thought to be made from a combination of foxtail and broomcorn millet, but subsequent experiments have shown millet alone could not have formed noodles, and that the Lajia noodles must have incorporated other starches, perhaps barley or wheat. Remnants of grains, including foxtail and broomcorn millet, and stems of Hordeum and Triticum species, have also been found at the site. The inhabitants used stone knives to process, peel, and cut them.

The inhabitants of Lajia kept domesticated sheep, pigs and cattle. Sheep were primarily used for their milk and wool, but were also the main source of meat. Pigs were not slaughtered for their meat, but used in ritual activities. Pig scapulae were modified for use as oracle bones for divination and, as is frequently seen at Qijia sites, deposited in burials. Wild deer remains have also been found at the site; they must have been hunted by the people of Lajia, or traded from elsewhere.

The pottery used at Lajia included pieces fired at extremely high temperatures to produce a glassy surface, a kind of proto-porcelain. Clays rich in flux were selected for their ability to vitrify at these temperatures. However, the technique used by the Lajia potters was unreliable and required large amounts of fuel, which is perhaps why the use of this proto-porcelain remained uncommon.

== Destruction ==
Lajia was destroyed by a natural disaster at Jishi Gorge that buried the site in mud and killed many of its inhabitants. The cause of this catastrophe is debated. The excavators of the site originally proposed a combination of simultaneous earthquakes and flooding of the Yellow River and mountain gullies. More recent research has pointed to localised flash flooding and severe mudflows, which are known to occur in the area and could have been exacerbated by human activity. A controversial 2016 study proposed that an earthquake in 1920 BCE triggered a catastrophic outburst flood of the Yellow River, which the authors incorrectly linked to the legendary Great Flood that, according to traditional Chinese historiography, led to the rise of the Xia dynasty. Other researchers considered this implausible, pointing out that the Lajia disaster took place over a hundred years after the 1920 earthquake, and that the lake that is supposed to have burst to produce this flood ceased to exist nearly 2000 years prior.

The simultaneous deaths of many people at Lajia provides a rare opportunity to study family relationships within prehistoric households. Analysis of ancient DNA from the remains of twelve people in one house showed that they belonged to multiple maternal lineages, ruling out a matrilineal social structure.
