= Xunhua Salar Autonomous County =

- Autonomous county

Name transcription(s)
  - Chinese: 循化撒拉族自治县
  - Salar: Gökdeñiz Velayat Yisır Salır Özbaşdak Yurt
  - Tibetan: ཞུན་ཧྭ་ས་ལར་རིགས་རང་སྐྱོང་རྫོང་།
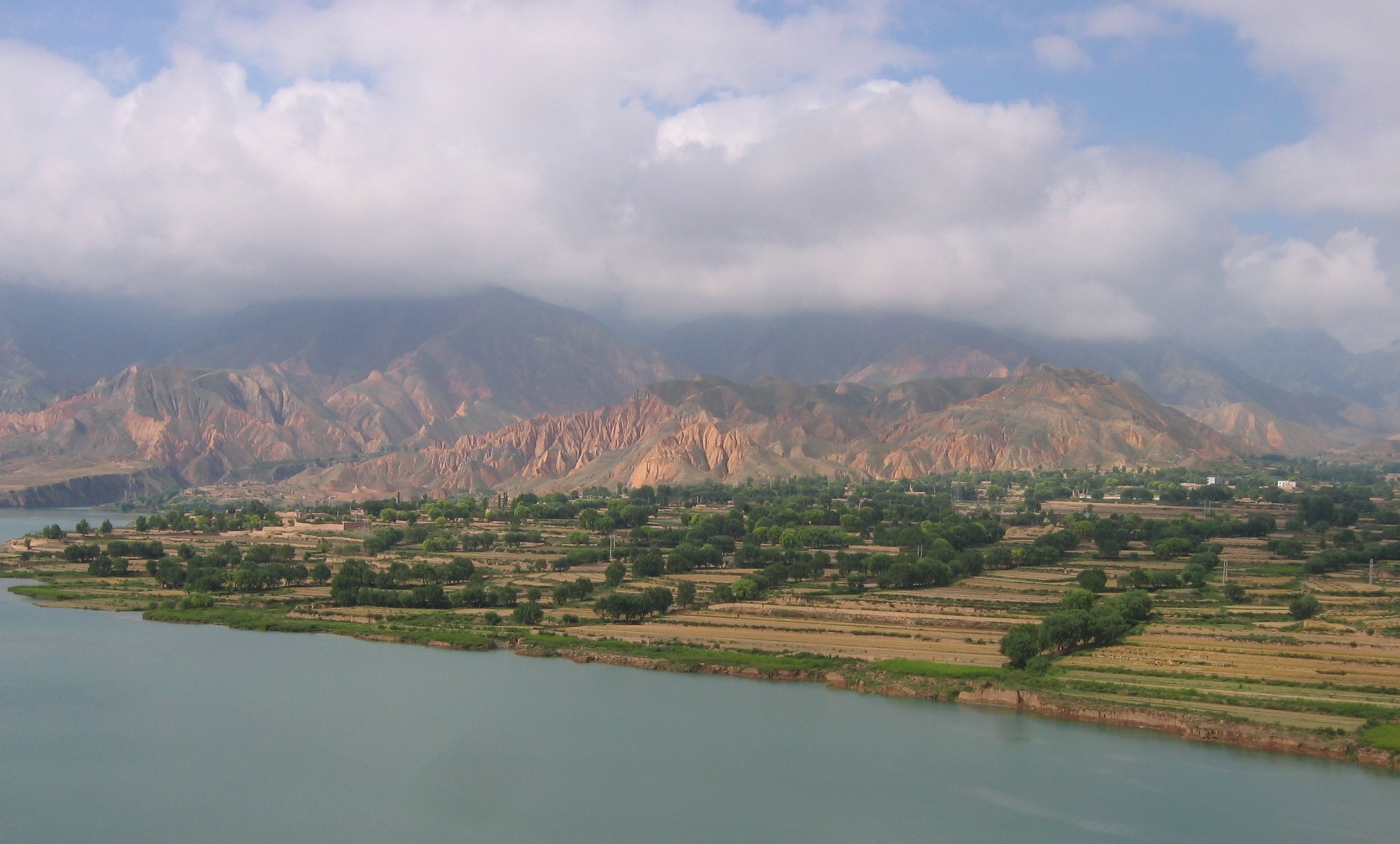

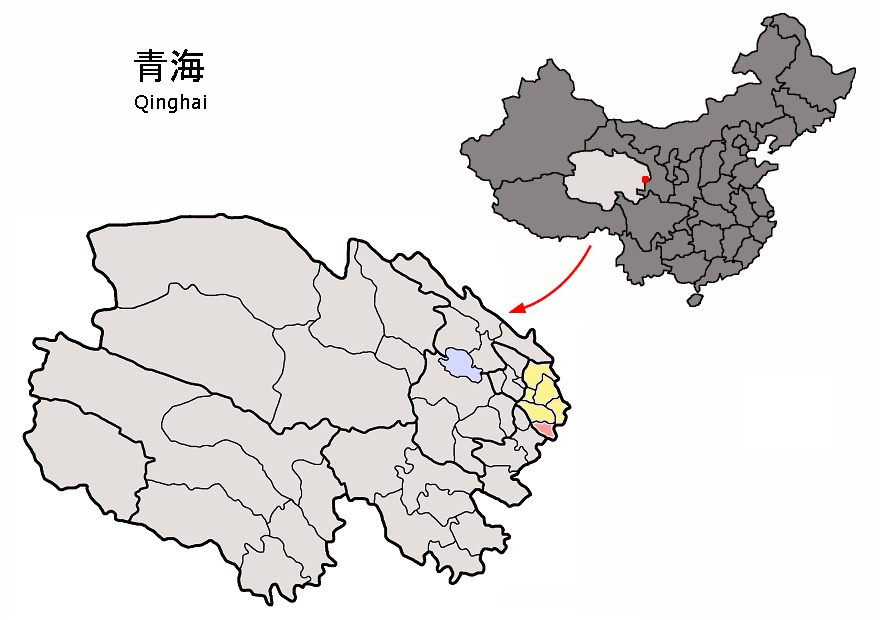
- Xunhua County (pink) within Haidong City (yellow) and Qinghai
- Coordinates (Xunhua government): 35°51′04″N 102°29′21″E
- Country: China
- Province: Qinghai
- Prefecture-level city: Haidong
- County seat: Jishi

Area
  - Total: 2,100 km^{2} (810 sq mi)

Population (2021)
  - Total: 161,600
  - Density: 77/km^{2} (200/sq mi)
- Time zone: UTC+8 (China Standard)
- Postal code: 811100

Xunhua Salar Autonomous County

Chinese name
- Simplified Chinese: 循化撒拉族自治縣
- Traditional Chinese: 循化撒拉族自治縣
Transcriptions
Standard Mandarin
- Hanyu Pinyin: Xúnhuà Sǎlázú Zìzhìxiàn

Tibetan name
- Tibetan: ཞུན་ཧྭ་ས་ལར་རིགས་རང་སྐྱོང་རྫོང་།
Transcriptions
- Wylie: zhun hwa sa lar rigs rang skyong rdzong

Salar name
- Salar: Göxdeñiz Velayat Yisır Salır Özbaşdak Yurt

Xunhua Salar Autonomous County (Note: Chinese: 循化撒拉族自治县; pinyin: Xúnhuà Sǎlázú Zìzhìxiàn; Salar: Gökhdengiz Velayat Yisyr Salyr Özbashdak Yurt; Tibetan: ཞུན་ཧྭ་ས་ལར་རིགས་རང་སྐྱོང་རྫོང་།, Wylie: zhun hwa sa lar rigs rang skyong rdzong) (Amdo Tibetan: ཡ་རྫི, Amdo Tibetan pronunciation: [jaɦdzə]) is an autonomous county in the southeast of Haidong Prefecture, in Qinghai province, China. The autonomous county has an area of around 2,100 square kilometres (810 sq mi), and a population of approximately 161,600 inhabitants per a 2022 government publication. In the east it borders the province of Gansu and in the south and the west Huangnan Tibetan Autonomous Prefecture. Its postal code is 811100 and its capital is the town of Jishi.

Xunhua County is the only autonomous county where the Salar are the sole titular minority. Salar language is an official language in Xunhua, as well as in Jishishan Bonan, Dongxiang and Salar Autonomous County.

As of April 2009, Xunhua is also the site of a mosque containing the oldest hand-written copy of the Quran in China, believed to have been written sometime between the 8th and 13th centuries.

== History ==
Xunhua County is the location of the Bronze Age necropolis Suzhi (simplified Chinese: 苏志墓地; traditional Chinese: 蘇志墓地; pinyin: Sūzhì Mùdì) of the Kayue culture.

=== Salar arrival ===
Ethnic Salars first arrived in present-day Xunhua Salar Autonomous County during the 13th or 14th century, as part of the Mongol army. Initially, Salar settlers cohabitated with ethnic Tibetans, moving into existing Tibetan villages along the Yellow River. However, as a result of population pressures and religious differences, conflicts between the two groups broke out, and Salar populations expelled local Tibetans, first from villages along the south of the Yellow River, and later, from villages along the northern bank.

The Ming dynasty established control of the area by the year 1370, placing it under the jurisdiction of Hezhou, located in Gansu. Following this conquest, Hui settlers from Hezhou began moving to the region, and began trading with and marrying local Salars. Many Salars originally surnamed "Han", which acted as a derivative of term "khan" adopted the surname "Ma", which acted as a derivative of "Muhammed". Marriage ceremonies, funerals, birth rites and prayer were shared by both Salar and Hui as they intermarried. These increasing economic and cultural ties between Salars and the Hui resulted in intermarriages between the two groups becoming commonplace, even more so than marriages between local Salars and Tibetans, or between Salars and Mongols and Han Chinese.

The Salar language, culture, and sociopolitical organization were all highly impacted throughout the 14th–16th centuries by large-scale interethnic contact and interethnic marriage. For example, Salars adopted high-walled adobe compounds and side-buttoning coats from Tibetic and Mongolic influences. The Salar language imported semantic and grammatical lexemes from Mongolic languages, and upon the end of Mongol rule in the late 14th century, many Salars were fluent in Tibetan and Chinese languages as a result of increasing contact with these two groups.

Since the early Ming dynasty, many Salars in the region engaged in long-distance traded along the Yellow River, a practice which has continued into modern times. Much of the region's trade had historically utilized the river to reach destinations such as Lanzhou and Ningxia.

In 1917, the Hui Muslim General Ma Anliang ordered his younger brother Ma Guoliang to suppress a rebellion of Tibetans in Xunhua who rebelled because of taxes Ma Anliang imposed on them. Ma Anliang did not report it to the central government in Beijing and was reprimanded for it and the Hui Muslim General Ma Qi was sent by the government to investigate the case and suppress the rebellion.

Choekyi Gyaltsen, the 10th Panchen Lama, was born in Xunhua Salar Autonomous County on February 19, 1938.

In April 1958, during the Great Leap Forward, an uprising of ethnic Tibetan and Salar people against the government took place, known as the Xunhua Incident. Over 400 people were killed by the People's Liberation Army as a result.

In 1996, Wimdo township only had one Salar because Tibetans complained about the Muslim call to prayer and a mosque built in the area in the early 1990s so they kicked out most of the Salars from the region.

== Geography ==
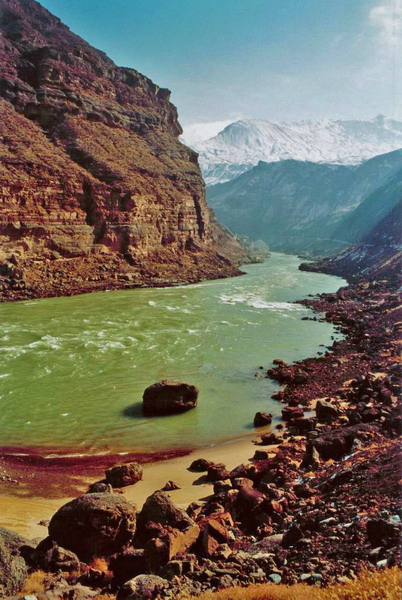
On the Yellow River near Xunhua

Xunhua Salar Autonomous County is located in the east of Qinghai province, under the jurisdiction of the prefecture-level city of Haidong. The autonomous county spans an area of approximately 2,100 square kilometres (810 mi^{2}), and has an average elevation of 2,300 metres (7,500 ft) above sea level.

The Yellow River flows through the autonomous county for more than 90 kilometres (56 mi).

== Climate ==
Climate data for Xunhua, elevation 1,921 m (6,302 ft), (1991–2020 normals, extremes 1981–2010)
Month	Jan	Feb	Mar	Apr	May	Jun	Jul	Aug	Sep	Oct	Nov	Dec	Year
Record high °C (°F)	13.4 (56.1)	20.5 (68.9)	29.9 (85.8)	32.8 (91.0)	33.2 (91.8)	34.1 (93.4)	38.2 (100.8)	35.8 (96.4)	32.0 (89.6)	26.6 (79.9)	21.1 (70.0)	14.8 (58.6)	38.2 (100.8)
Mean daily maximum °C (°F)	3.5 (38.3)	7.3 (45.1)	13.1 (55.6)	19.1 (66.4)	22.4 (72.3)	25.5 (77.9)	27.5 (81.5)	26.4 (79.5)	21.8 (71.2)	16.7 (62.1)	10.9 (51.6)	5.0 (41.0)	16.6 (61.9)
Daily mean °C (°F)	−3.9 (25.0)	0.1 (32.2)	5.8 (42.4)	11.7 (53.1)	15.3 (59.5)	18.7 (65.7)	20.6 (69.1)	19.9 (67.8)	15.5 (59.9)	9.8 (49.6)	3.0 (37.4)	−2.7 (27.1)	9.5 (49.1)
Mean daily minimum °C (°F)	−9.8 (14.4)	−6.0 (21.2)	−0.4 (31.3)	4.8 (40.6)	8.6 (47.5)	12.1 (53.8)	14.4 (57.9)	14.1 (57.4)	10.4 (50.7)	4.2 (39.6)	−3.2 (26.2)	−8.3 (17.1)	3.4 (38.1)
Record low °C (°F)	−20.6 (−5.1)	−17.9 (−0.2)	−12.4 (9.7)	−5.6 (21.9)	−1.5 (29.3)	4.1 (39.4)	6.8 (44.2)	6.3 (43.3)	0.6 (33.1)	−8.3 (17.1)	−13.6 (7.5)	−18.4 (−1.1)	−20.6 (−5.1)
Average precipitation mm (inches)	0.5 (0.02)	0.3 (0.01)	2.3 (0.09)	11.8 (0.46)	32.0 (1.26)	38.8 (1.53)	70.5 (2.78)	58.3 (2.30)	42.1 (1.66)	14.8 (0.58)	0.7 (0.03)	0.2 (0.01)	272.3 (10.73)
Average precipitation days (≥ 0.1 mm)	0.8	0.9	2.3	4.3	9.6	12.1	13.5	11.7	11.7	5.8	1.1	0.4	74.2
Average snowy days	2.1	2.6	2.6	0.9	0	0	0	0	0	0.5	1.8	1.5	12
Average relative humidity (%)	43	41	40	41	51	57	62	63	66	61	49	47	52
Mean monthly sunshine hours	202.3	197.3	228.2	243.6	245.3	232.6	241.4	236.4	187.0	201.8	205.2	204.3	2,625.4
Percentage possible sunshine	65	64	61	62	56	53	55	57	51	59	67	68	60
Source: China Meteorological Administration

== Administrative divisions ==
Xunhua Salar Autonomous County administers three towns, two townships, and four ethnic townships:

- Jishi Town (积石镇)
- Baizhuang Town (白庄镇)
- Jiezi Town (街子镇)
- Qingshui Township (清水乡)
- Chahandousi Township (查汗都斯乡)
- Dobi Tibetan Ethnic Township (道帏藏族乡, རྡོ་སྦིས་བོད་རིགས་ཞང་།)
- Gangca Tibetan Ethnic Township (岗察藏族乡, རྐང་ཚ་བོད་རིགས་ཞང་།)
- Windo Tibetan Ethnic Township (文都藏族乡, བིས་མདོ་བོད་རིགས་ཞང་།)
- Garing Tibetan Ethnic Township (尕楞藏族乡, ཀ་རིང་བོད་རིགས་ཞང་།)

== Demographics ==
Xunhua Salar Autonomous County is a majority-minority region within China, with the eponymous Salar people constituting 62.7% of the autonomous county's population, per a 2022 government publication. Other sizeable ethnic minority populations within the autonomous county include Tibetans and the Hui. Conversely, the Han Chinese make up just 6.5% of the autonomous county's population.

Ethnic groups in Xunhua, 2000 census
Nationality	Population	Percentage
Salar	63,859	61.14%
Tibetan	25,783	24.68%
Hui	8,155	7.81%
Han	6,217	5.95%
Tu	134	0.13%
Dongxiang	116	0.11%
Mongol	39	0.04%
Qiang	35	0.03%
Bonan	22	0.02%
Blang	18	0.02%
Buyei	12	0.01%
Others	62	0.06%

=== Salar subgroups ===
Salars in the area live along both banks of the Yellow River, south and north. Due to a prolonged period of separation due to a lack of bridge across the river, separate subgroups of Salars in the areas emerged: Bayan Salars, largely concentrated in present-day Hualong Hui Autonomous County to the north, and Xunhua Salars who largely reside in Xunhua Salar Autonomous County. This physical separation has resulted linguistic and cultural differences between Xunhua Salars and Bayan Salars to the north, to such a degree that government officials from the Qing dynasty identified them as two distinct groups. The region north of the Yellow River is a mix of discontinuous Salar and Tibetan villages while the region south of the yellow river is solidly Salar with no gaps in between, since Hui and Salars pushed the Tibetans on the south region out earlier.

== Economy ==
In 2021, Xunhua Salar Autonomous County's gross domestic product (GDP) totaled 4.036 billion renminbi (RMB), an increase of 6.5% over the previous year. Total retail sales in the autonomous county totaled 1.19 billion RMB, an increase of 7.5% from the previous year.

As of 2021, the per capita disposable income of urban residents reached 35,233 RMB, an increase of 6.8% from the previous year; per capita disposable income of rural residents totaled 13,773 RMB, an increase of 10.6% from the previous year.

The autonomous county has a sizeable tourism industry, and boasts a number of eco-tourist attractions. Xunhua Salar Autonomous County received approximately 4.36 million tourists in 2021, and earned 2.25 billion renminbi in tourist revenue.

== Culture ==
Lamian is a popular dish in the area, with the autonomous county's government boasting that the region has nearly 10,000 lamian shops.

== See also ==
- Choekyi Gyaltsen, 10th Panchen Lama
- Han Youwen
- Jishi Bonan, Dongxiang and Salar Autonomous County
- List of administrative divisions of Qinghai
- Salar people
- Xunhua incident
