= Duosong Township, Qinghai =

Duosong Township 多松乡
- Township
- Duosongxiang
- Location in Qinghai
- Coordinates: 34°19′55″N 101°19′33″E
- Country: People's Republic of China
- Province: Qinghai
- Autonomous prefecture: Huangnan Tibetan Autonomous Prefecture
- County: Henan Mongol Autonomous County

Area
  - Total: 584.4 km^{2} (225.6 sq mi)

Population (2010)
  - Total: 2,319
  - Density: 3.968/km^{2} (10.28/sq mi)
- Time zone: UTC+8 (China Standard)
- Local dialing code: 973

Duosong Township (Chinese: 多松乡) is a township in Henan Mongol Autonomous County, Huangnan Tibetan Autonomous Prefecture, Qinghai, China. In 2010, Duosong Township had a total population of 2,319: 1,151 males and 1,168 females: 555 aged under 14, 1,645 aged between 15 and 65 and 119 aged over 65.
