= Maketang, Qinghai =

Maketang 马克堂镇
- Town
- Maketangzhen
- Location in Qinghai
- Coordinates: 35°57′2″N 101°58′7″E
- Country: People's Republic of China
- Province: Qinghai
- Autonomous prefecture: Huangnan Tibetan Autonomous Prefecture
- County: Jainca County

Area
  - Total: 100.5 km^{2} (38.8 sq mi)

Population (2010)
  - Total: 19,226
  - Density: 191.3/km^{2} (495.5/sq mi)
- Time zone: UTC+8 (China Standard)
- Postal code: 811299
- Local dialing code: 974

Maketang (Mandarin: 马克堂镇) is a town in Jainca County, Huangnan Tibetan Autonomous Prefecture, Qinghai, China. In 2010, Maketang had a total population of 19,226 people: 9,841 males and 9,385 females: 5,169 under 14 years old, 13,054 aged between 15 and 64 and 1,003 over 65 years old.
