= Huangnaihai Township, Qinghai =

Huangnaihai Township 黄乃亥乡
- Township
- Huanghaihaixiang
- Location in Qinghai
- Coordinates: 35°36′58″N 102°0′34″E
- Country: People's Republic of China
- Province: Qinghai
- Autonomous prefecture: Huangnan Tibetan Autonomous Prefecture
- County: Tongren County

Area
  - Total: 85.87 km^{2} (33.15 sq mi)

Population (2010)
  - Total: 3,152
  - Density: 36.71/km^{2} (95.07/sq mi)
- Time zone: UTC+8 (China Standard)
- Postal code: 811301
- Local dialing code: 974

Huangnaihai Township (Mandarin: 黄乃亥乡) is a township in Tongren County, Huangnan Tibetan Autonomous Prefecture, Qinghai, China. In 2010, Huangnaihai Township had a total population of 3,152 people: 1,592 males and 1,560 females: 769 under 14 years old, 2,152 aged between 15 and 64 and 231 over 65 years old.
