= Cuozhou Township, Qinghai =

Cuozhou Township 措周乡
- Township
- Cuozhouxiang
- Location in Qinghai
- Coordinates: 35°56′59″N 101°55′22″E
- Country: People's Republic of China
- Province: Qinghai
- Autonomous prefecture: Huangnan Tibetan Autonomous Prefecture
- County: Jainca County

Area
  - Total: 143.1 km^{2} (55.3 sq mi)

Population (2010)
  - Total: 4,415
  - Density: 30.85/km^{2} (79.91/sq mi)
- Time zone: UTC+8 (China Standard)
- Local dialing code: 974

Cuozhou Township (Chinese: 措周乡) is a township in Jainca County, Huangnan Tibetan Autonomous Prefecture, Qinghai, China. In 2010, Cuozhou Township had a total population of 4,415 people: 2,194 males and 2,221 females: 991 under 14 years old, 3,105 aged between 15 and 64 and 319 over 65 years old.
