= Zhamao Township, Qinghai =

Zhamao Township 扎毛乡
- Township
- Zhamaoxiang
- Location in Qinghai
- Coordinates: 35°20′40″N 101°54′0″E
- Country: People's Republic of China
- Province: Qinghai
- Autonomous prefecture: Huangnan Tibetan Autonomous Prefecture
- County: Tongren County

Area
  - Total: 217.1 km^{2} (83.8 sq mi)

Population (2010)
  - Total: 4,364
  - Density: 20.10/km^{2} (52.06/sq mi)
- Time zone: UTC+8 (China Standard)
- Local dialing code: 973

Zhamao Township (Chinese: 扎毛乡) is a township in Tongren County, Huangnan Tibetan Autonomous Prefecture, Qinghai, China. In 2010, Zhamao Township had a total population of 4,364: 2,205 males and 2,159 females: 1,228 aged under 14, 2,873 aged between 15 and 65 and 263 aged over 65.
