= Sai'erlong Township, Qinghai =

Sai'erlong Township 赛尔龙乡
- Township
- Sai'erlongxiang
- Location in Qinghai
- Coordinates: 34°29′1″N 102°8′27″E
- Country: People's Republic of China
- Province: Qinghai
- Autonomous prefecture: Huangnan Tibetan Autonomous Prefecture
- County: Henan Mongol Autonomous County

Area
  - Total: 1,013 km^{2} (391 sq mi)

Population (2010)
  - Total: 3,038
  - Density: 2.999/km^{2} (7.767/sq mi)
- Time zone: UTC+8 (China Standard)
- Local dialing code: 973

Sai'erlong Township (Chinese: 赛尔龙乡) is a township in Henan Mongol Autonomous County, Huangnan Tibetan Autonomous Prefecture, Qinghai, China. In 2010, Sai'erlong Township had a total population of 3,038: 1,604 males and 1,434 females: 600 aged under 14, 2,259 aged between 15 and 65 and 179 aged over 65.
