= Bao'an, Qinghai =

Bao'an 保安镇
- Town
- Bao'anzhen
- Location in Qinghai
- Coordinates: 35°37′7″N 102°4′10″E
- Country: People's Republic of China
- Province: Qinghai
- Autonomous prefecture: Huangnan Tibetan Autonomous Prefecture
- County: Tongren County

Area
  - Total: 300.6 km^{2} (116.1 sq mi)

Population (2010)
  - Total: 10,771
  - Density: 35.83/km^{2} (92.80/sq mi)
- Time zone: UTC+8 (China Standard)
- Local dialing code: 973

Bao'an (Chinese: 保安镇) is a town in Tongren County, Huangnan Tibetan Autonomous Prefecture, Qinghai, China. In 2010, Bao'an had a total population of 10,771 people: 5,332 males and 5,439 females: 2,441 under 14 years old, 7,396 aged between 15 and 64 and 934 over 65 years old.
