= Angla Township, Qinghai =

Angla Township 昂拉乡
- Township
- Anglaxiang
- Location in Qinghai
- Coordinates: 35°53′22″N 102°2′38″E
- Country: People's Republic of China
- Province: Qinghai
- Autonomous prefecture: Huangnan Tibetan Autonomous Prefecture
- County: Jainca County

Area
  - Total: 77.84 km^{2} (30.05 sq mi)

Population (2010)
  - Total: 2,449
  - Density: 31.46/km^{2} (81.49/sq mi)
- Time zone: UTC+8 (China Standard)
- Local dialing code: 974

Angla Township (Mandarin: 昂拉乡) is a township in Jainca County, Huangnan Tibetan Autonomous Prefecture, Qinghai, China. In 2010, Angla Township had a total population of 2,449 people: 1,250 males and 1,199 females: 569 under 14 years old, 1,687 aged between 15 and 64 and 193 over 65 years old.
