= Jiawu Township, Qinghai =

Jiawu Township 加吾乡
- Township
- Jiawuxiang
- Location in Qinghai
- Coordinates: 35°29′8″N 102°3′18″E
- Country: People's Republic of China
- Province: Qinghai
- Autonomous prefecture: Huangnan Tibetan Autonomous Prefecture
- County: Tongren County

Area
  - Total: 134.3 km^{2} (51.9 sq mi)

Population (2010)
  - Total: 4,481
  - Density: 33.37/km^{2} (86.42/sq mi)
- Time zone: UTC+8 (China Standard)
- Local dialing code: 973

Jiawu Township (Mandarin: 加吾乡) is a township in Tongren County, Huangnan Tibetan Autonomous Prefecture, Qinghai, China. In 2010, Jiawu Township had a total population of 4,481: 2,247 males and 2,234 females: 1,108 aged under 14, 2,998 aged between 15 and 65 and 375 aged over 65.
