= Ningmute Township, Qinghai =

Ningmute Township 宁木特镇
- Township
- Ningmutexiang
- Location in Qinghai
- Coordinates: 34°35′26″N 101°20′13″E
- Country: People's Republic of China
- Province: Qinghai
- Autonomous prefecture: Huangnan Tibetan Autonomous Prefecture
- County: Henan Mongol Autonomous County

Area
  - Total: 1,803 km^{2} (696 sq mi)

Population (2010)
  - Total: 9,677
  - Density: 5.367/km^{2} (13.90/sq mi)
- Time zone: UTC+8 (China Standard)
- Local dialing code: 973

Ningmute Township (Chinese: 宁木特镇) is a township in Henan Mongol Autonomous County, Huangnan Tibetan Autonomous Prefecture, Qinghai, China. In 2010, Ningmute Township had a total population of 9,677: 4,865 males and 4,812 females: 2,619 aged under 14, 6,552 aged between 15 and 65 and 506 aged over 65.
