= Jianzhatan Township, Qinghai =

Jianzhatan Township 尖扎滩乡
- Township
- Jainzhatanxiang
- Location in Qinghai
- Coordinates: 35°45′59″N 101°52′10″E
- Country: People's Republic of China
- Province: Qinghai
- Autonomous prefecture: Huangnan Tibetan Autonomous Prefecture
- County: Jainca County

Area
  - Total: 523.2 km^{2} (202.0 sq mi)

Population (2010)
  - Total: 4,871
  - Density: 9.310/km^{2} (24.11/sq mi)
- Time zone: UTC+8 (China Standard)
- Local dialing code: 974

Jianzhatan Township (Chinese: 尖扎滩乡) is a township in Jainca County, Huangnan Tibetan Autonomous Prefecture, Qinghai, China. In 2010, Jianzhatan Township had a total population of 4,871 people: 2,383 males and 2,488 females: 1,342 under 14 years old, 3,256 aged between 15 and 64 and 273 over 65 years old.
