= Lancai Township, Qinghai =

Lancai Township 兰采乡
- Township
- Lancaixiang
- Location in Qinghai
- Coordinates: 35°39′54″N 101°49′0″E
- Country: People's Republic of China
- Province: Qinghai
- Autonomous prefecture: Huangnan Tibetan Autonomous Prefecture
- County: Tongren County

Area
  - Total: 383 km^{2} (148 sq mi)

Population (2010)
  - Total: 4,207
  - Density: 11.0/km^{2} (28.4/sq mi)
- Time zone: UTC+8 (China Standard)
- Local dialing code: 973

Lancai Township (Chinese: 兰采乡) is a township in Tongren County, Huangnan Tibetan Autonomous Prefecture, Qinghai, China. In 2010, Lancai Township had a total population of 4,207: 2,133 males and 2,074 females: 1,312 aged under 14, 2,664 aged between 15 and 65 and 231 aged over 65.
