= Shuangpengxi Township, Qinghai =

Shuangpengxi Township 双朋西乡
- Township
- Shuangpengxixiang
- Location in Qinghai
- Coordinates: 35°33′48″N 102°1′58″E
- Country: People's Republic of China
- Province: Qinghai
- Autonomous prefecture: Huangnan Tibetan Autonomous Prefecture
- County: Tongren County

Area
  - Total: 232.8 km^{2} (89.9 sq mi)

Population (2010)
  - Total: 3,276
  - Density: 14.07/km^{2} (36.45/sq mi)
- Time zone: UTC+8 (China Standard)
- Local dialing code: 973

Shuangpengxi Township (Chinese: 双朋西乡) is a township in Tongren County, Huangnan Tibetan Autonomous Prefecture, Qinghai, China. In 2010, Shuangpengxi Township had a total population of 3,276: 1,582 males and 1,694 females: 774 aged under 14, 2,155 aged between 15 and 65 and 347 aged over 65.
