= Kesheng Township, Qinghai =

Kesheng Township 柯生乡
- Township
- Keshengxiang
- Location in Qinghai
- Coordinates: 34°12′16″N 101°33′37″E
- Country: People's Republic of China
- Province: Qinghai
- Autonomous prefecture: Huangnan Tibetan Autonomous Prefecture
- County: Henan Mongol Autonomous County

Area
  - Total: 1,072 km^{2} (414 sq mi)

Population (2010)
  - Total: 3,017
  - Density: 2.814/km^{2} (7.289/sq mi)
- Time zone: UTC+8 (China Standard)
- Local dialing code: 973

Kesheng Township (Chinese: 柯生乡) is a township in Henan Mongol Autonomous County, Huangnan Tibetan Autonomous Prefecture, Qinghai, China. In 2010, Kesheng Township had a total population of 3,017: 1,546 males and 1,471 females: 764 aged under 14, 2,108 aged between 15 and 65 and 145 aged over 65.
