= Jiajia Township, Qinghai =

Jiajia Township 贾加乡
- Township
- Jiajiaxiang
- Location in Qinghai
- Coordinates: 35°59′10″N 101°51′53″E
- Country: People's Republic of China
- Province: Qinghai
- Autonomous prefecture: Huangnan Tibetan Autonomous Prefecture
- County: Jainca County

Area
  - Total: 133.5 km^{2} (51.5 sq mi)

Population (2010)
  - Total: 1,612
  - Density: 12.07/km^{2} (31.27/sq mi)
- Time zone: UTC+8 (China Standard)
- Local dialing code: 974

Jiajia Township (Chinese: 贾加乡) is a township in Jainca County, Huangnan Tibetan Autonomous Prefecture, Qinghai, China. In 2010, Jiajia Township had a total population of 1,612 people: 789 males and 823 females: 353 under 14 years old, 1,115 aged between 15 and 64 and 144 over 65 years old.
