= Dangshun Township, Qinghai =

Dangshun Township 当顺乡
- Township
- Dangshunxiang
- Location in Qinghai
- Coordinates: 35°50′46″N 102°1′54″E
- Country: People's Republic of China
- Province: Qinghai
- Autonomous prefecture: Huangnan Tibetan Autonomous Prefecture
- County: Jainca County

Area
  - Total: 128.7 km^{2} (49.7 sq mi)

Population (2010)
  - Total: 1,878
  - Density: 14.59/km^{2} (37.79/sq mi)
- Time zone: UTC+8 (China Standard)
- Local dialing code: 974

Dangshun Township (Chinese: 当顺乡) is a township in Jainca County, Huangnan Tibetan Autonomous Prefecture, Qinghai, China. In 2010, Dangshun Township had a total population of 1,878 people: 916 males and 962 females: 441 under 14 years old, 1,286 aged between 15 and 64 and 151 over 65 years old.
