= Tuoyema Township, Qinghai =

Tuoyema Township 托叶玛乡
- Township
- Tuoyemaxiang
- Location in Qinghai
- Coordinates: 34°35′47″N 101°32′10″E
- Country: People's Republic of China
- Province: Qinghai
- Autonomous prefecture: Huangnan Tibetan Autonomous Prefecture
- County: Henan Mongol Autonomous County
- Village-level divisions: 6

Population (2019)
  - Total: 3,000
- Time zone: UTC+8 (China Standard)
- Local dialing code: 973

Tuoyema Township (Chinese: 托叶玛乡) is a township in central Henan Mongol Autonomous County, Huangnan Tibetan Autonomous Prefecture, Qinghai, China, 22 kilometres away from the county seat. Tuoyema has 6 villages under its township-level jurisdiction:

- Ningsai Village
- Quhai Village
- Qulong Village
- Tuoyema Village
- Wenqun Village
- Xiawute Village

Tuoyema's total population is 3,000 and 99.8% of Tuoyema Township's population is of Mongolian descent.
