= Qukuhu Township, Qinghai =

Qukuhu Township 曲库乎乡
- Township
- Qukuhuxiang
- Location in Qinghai
- Coordinates: 35°24′27″N 101°57′56″E
- Country: People's Republic of China
- Province: Qinghai
- Autonomous prefecture: Huangnan Tibetan Autonomous Prefecture
- County: Tongren County

Area
  - Total: 223.2 km^{2} (86.2 sq mi)

Population (2010)
  - Total: 7,223
  - Density: 32.36/km^{2} (83.81/sq mi)
- Time zone: UTC+8 (China Standard)
- Local dialing code: 973

Qukuhu Township (Chinese: 曲库乎乡) is a township in Tongren County, Huangnan Tibetan Autonomous Prefecture, Qinghai, China. In 2010, Qukuhu Township had a total population of 7,223: 3,630 males and 3,593 females: 1,847 aged under 14, 4,889 aged between 15 and 65 and 487 aged over 65.
