= Guashize Township, Qinghai =

Guashize Township 阿什努乡
- Township
- Guashizexiang
- Location in Qinghai
- Coordinates: 35°29′36″N 102°16′52″E
- Country: People's Republic of China
- Province: Qinghai
- Autonomous prefecture: Huangnan Tibetan Autonomous Prefecture
- County: Tongren County

Area
  - Total: 422.9 km^{2} (163.3 sq mi)

Population (2010)
  - Total: 4,355
  - Density: 10.30/km^{2} (26.67/sq mi)
- Time zone: UTC+8 (China Standard)
- Postal code: 811301
- Local dialing code: 973

Guashize Township (Mandarin: 瓜什则乡) is a township in Tongren County, Huangnan Tibetan Autonomous Prefecture, Qinghai, China. In 2010, Guashize Township had a total population of 4,355: 2,165 males and 2,190 females: 1,114 aged under 14, 2,960 aged between 15 and 65 and 281 aged over 65.
