= Nengke Township, Qinghai =

Nengke Township 能科乡
- Township
- Nengkexiang
- Location in Qinghai
- Coordinates: 35°52′20″N 101°58′1″E
- Country: People's Republic of China
- Province: Qinghai
- Autonomous prefecture: Huangnan Tibetan Autonomous Prefecture
- County: Jainca County

Area
  - Total: 60.72 km^{2} (23.44 sq mi)

Population (2010)
  - Total: 1,976
  - Density: 32.54/km^{2} (84.29/sq mi)
- Time zone: UTC+8 (China Standard)
- Local dialing code: 973

Nengke Township (Chinese: 能科乡) is a township in Jainca County, Huangnan Tibetan Autonomous Prefecture, Qinghai, China. In 2010, Nengke Township had a total population of 1,976 people: 1,027 males and 949 females: 422 under 14 years old, 1,385 aged between 15 and 64 and 169 over 65 years old.
