= Kangyang =

Kangyang may refer to:

- Kangyang, Qinghai, a town in Qinghai, China
- Kangyang station, a railway station in North Hamgyong Province, North Korea
- Zhang Kangyang (born 1991), Chinese businessman
