= Regong arts =

Popular arts on the subject of Tibetan Buddhism

- UNESCO Intangible Cultural Heritage
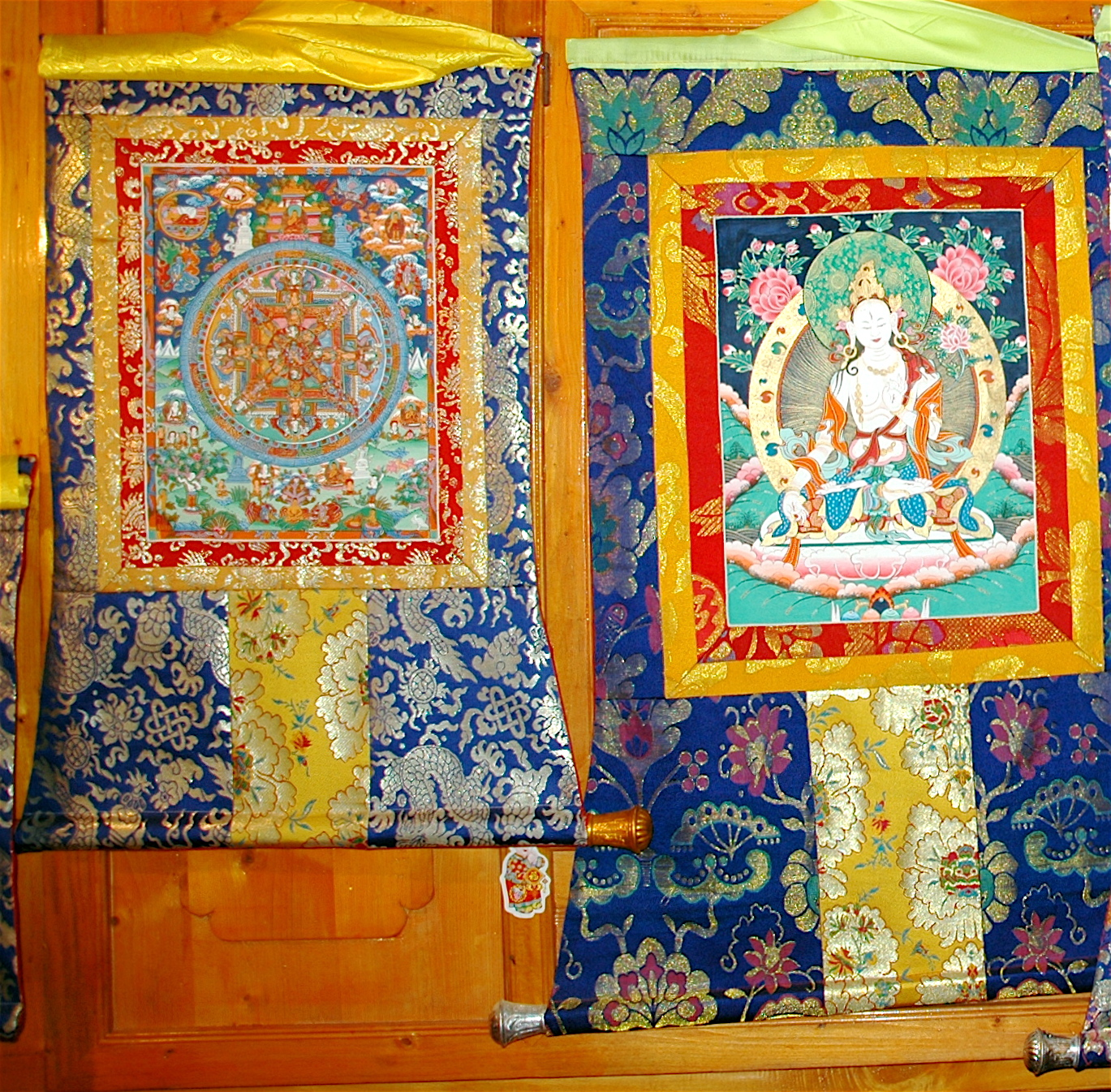
- The Thangka
- Country: China
- Reference: 00207
- Region: Asia and Pacific

Inscription history
- Inscription: 2009
- List: Representative

The Regong arts (or Rebgong arts) are the popular arts on the subject of Tibetan Buddhism. They are painting, sculpture, engraving, architecture, and embroidery. They are associated with communities in Tongren County and along the river Rongwo which crosses the current Huangnan Tibetan Autonomous Prefecture in the province of Qinghai in China.

Regong arts were included in 2009 on the representative list of intangible cultural heritage.

== History ==
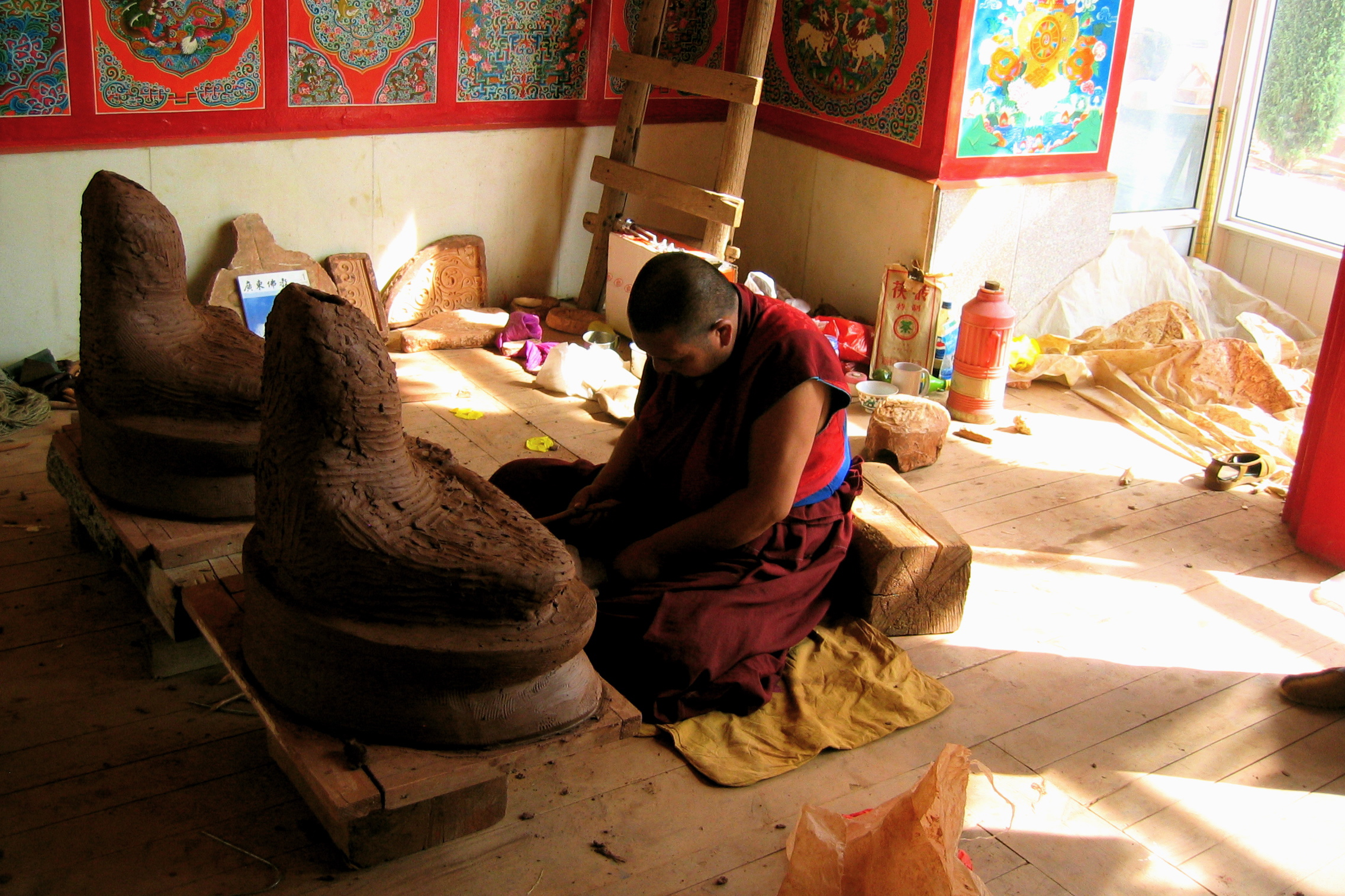
Sculpture at Rongwo Monastery

Regong arts trace their origins to the 10th century

== Different Regong arts ==
- The thangka, literally something which is unrolled, is a painting on canvas characteristic of Tibetan culture. Canvases of all sizes can be found, from thangka portraits which can be unrolled due to two sticks passing through eyelets, up to momentous designed to be unrolled to cover a wall or door, which can measure dozens of metres. The thangkas generally represent mystic symbols (mandala), divinities of Tibetan Buddhism or Bon, or portraits of the Dalai Lama. They are often used as support for meditation.
- The Thangka paintings stand as a paramount art form in Asia, it embodies intricate Buddhist symbolism that demands comprehensive expertise and scholarly investigation. Every ornament, posture, and attribute holds profound significance, reflecting specific aspects of Buddhism and the related teachings. While materials have evolved, the techniques and methodologies have remained essentially unchanged, preserving the traditional essence of this art form.
- The hues of the Thangka painting are naturally extracted from plants and minerals, and adorned with 24k gold paint. Each art piece of Thangka carries a unique tradition and lesson that survives intact to the present day.
- Generally, Thangka paintings fall into two categories: painted (palas) and silk-made. While Thangka can be used as educational aids of Buddha to illustrate historical events to related lamas, Thangka are also used as a centrepiece in meditation rituals and worshipers’ rituals. Most Thangka paintings were crafted by monks, who acquired merits to do so. Rather than being sold for a fee, the art pieces were then given to monasteries and individuals in exchange for “gifts”.
- The Dui tapestries (duixiu) or barbola are pictures of animals and plants, decorated on silk, which creates a relief. These can be used to decorate columns or on walls.
- Regong sculptures can be made of clay, wood, stone or brick, and decorate temples and homes; mural panels, furniture, or tables for serving tea.

== See also ==
- Tibetan art
