= Kelden Gyatso =

Tibetan poet, scholar, and siddha

Kelden Gyatso (Kalden Gyatso, Kelden Repa, Tibetan: སྐལ་ལྡན་རྒྱ་མཚོ, Wylie: Skal ldan rgya mtsho) (1607-1677) was a 17th-century Tibetan poet, scholar, and siddha. He was the first of the Rongwo Drubchen tulku lineage, and an important figure for Buddhism in Amdo, a region of north-eastern Tibet. The founder of a religious college and a seminary for tantric studies in Rebgong, throughout his life Kelden struggled between his desire to become a recluse hermit and his responsibility to these institutions. While he was ordained and taught in the Gelug school, he had a special affinity for Milarepa, the legendary Tibetan poet of the Kagyu school. The information that survives about Kelden comes from a biography by Jangchup Mila Ngawang Sönam (1636-1716), and from his poetry and songs, both written down and performed today by monks in Amdo.

== Life ==
=== Early life and study ===
Kelden Gyatso was born in 1607, in Rebgong, Amdo, Tibet. His birth was foretold; his father is said to have been promised “three famous sons” by a clairvoyant siddha. One of these sons, Kelden's older brother Chöpa Rinpoche (1581-1659), was 26 at the time of Kelden's birth and already established as a monk; he would later become Kelden's teacher. Kelden was briefly raised by Chöpa, who gave him lay vows, and took him to Ü-Tsang to become a monk. At eleven, the thirteenth Ganden Tripa gave him his novice vows at Ganden monastery, but he soon moved to Drepung monastery to actually complete his schooling. There he studied scriptures and tantric ritual for nine years. At age twenty, Kelden received full ordination from the Fourth Panchen Lama, Lobsang Chökyi Gyaltsen, in Lhasa. He long regarded Ü-Tsang as a place of more spiritual awakening, compared to his home in Amdo which he regarded as “barbarous”.

=== Return to Amdo and later life ===
Shortly after, he returned home to Amdo, where he planned to pursue a removed, ascetic lifestyle. His older brother, however, made him promise to found a school. He thus converted the Sakya Rongwo Monastery in Rebgong to the Gelug school and established it as a religious college. Eighteen years later, he founded a seminary for tantric studies, where mountain hermits could study tantric practice before returning to their hermitages. He took care of these schools until his death.

== Struggles ==
=== Backwardness of Amdo ===
Amdo is described by Kelden Gyatso in his mgur as having once been a spiritually awakened place, but having since fallen to disrepair. He laments this not only for the sake of the people, but also for his own sake, as he sees this backwardness as a direct barrier to his own awakening. When the 5th Dalai Lama, Ngawang Lobsang Gyatso, traveled through the region in 1653 on his way to China, Kelden Gyatso met with him to offer gifts and receive teachings. In his mgur, he describes how the Dalai Lama converted a number of local deities, such as Machen Pomra, a mountain deity of Amdo. Gyatso thus likens the Dalai Lama to the legendary Padmasambhava, the master who first tamed the local deities of Tibet during the first transmission of Buddhism. The need for this kind of ritual conversion also demonstrates the lack of Buddhist teaching in Amdo.

=== Mongol rule ===
Throughout the Kelden's life, Amdo was occupied by Mongol tribes. They had entered the region in the 1500s and held it since; in Kelden's lifetime it was used as a springboard to enter into central Tibet. The Kagyu school had held significant power over central Tibet until the middle of the 17th century, when Güshi Khan of the Khoshut Khanate invaded and installed the 5th Dalai Lama (a Gelugpa leader) as the political leader of Tibet. This marks the beginning of the Gelug school's dominance over Tibet and paved the way for the expansion of Buddhism into Amdo. While Kelden was a part of the Gelug school, and his ability to establish a monastery and religious college at Rongwo was likely linked to Mongol rule and patronage, he still saw this rule as detrimental to the region and its people. From Mgur XI-10,

"When [we] look at [their] material goods [and] sloppy way of doing work, It is difficult [for us] to integrate mind with religion."

Mongol dominance to the Tibetans escalated cultural tensions, especially in regards to Buddhist practice, which Kelden always prioritized.

=== Obligations to institutions ===
The college and seminary were among Kelden's greatest achievements, yet he frequently saw them as obstacles to his own personal practice. He even went so far as to criticize the very institutions he had established, stating

“A monastery, seminary, a clay throne, etc., A monastery and a religious college cause no benefit at all.”

In 1670, just seven years before his death, Kelden finally stepped away from these institutions and retreated to the mountains, where he spent his final days.

== Legacy ==
=== Rongwo Drubchen line ===
Kelden Gyatso was the first of one of the most important tulku lineages in Amdo, the Rongwo Drubchen line. This tulku lineage was closely tied to the institutions Kelden founded in his lifetime. The line survived until 1978, when the 7th Rongwo Drubchen died. Nothing is known of this lineage holder's life beyond the age of 27, when he took over as the head of the college Kelden had founded at Rongwo monastery.

=== Buddhist resurgence in Amdo ===
Along with the larger Gelug rise to power, Kelden Gyatso is seen as instrumental in the revival of Buddhism in Amdo in the 17th century. According to his biography, he had many students in his lifetime, many of whom followed his example by returning to their own regions and founding colleges and seminaries for tantric studies.
