= 河南 (disambiguation) =

河南 is the Chinese name for Henan province in China.

河南 may also refer to:

- Hà Nam Province, Vietnam
- Hà Nam ward, Ninh Bình Province, Vietnam
- Henan Mongol Autonomous County, Qinghai, China
- Tuyuhun, also known as "Henan State" (河南国/河南國)
- Hanam, city in Gyeonggi-do, South Korea
- An informal name for Haizhu District, Guangzhou, China
