= National Cultural Ecosystem Conservation Areas of China =

A National Cultural Ecosystem Conservation Area (NCECA) is a specific area designated by the Ministry of Culture and Tourism of the People's Republic of China. Created to holistically protecting cultural patterns that are historically and culturally rich, in good state of existence and have important values and distinctive features, its core function is to preserve the intangible cultural heritage in China.

Twenty-one out of twenty-three conservation areas were formally designated by the Ministry. The rest of them are technically called "experiment areas". A formal designation as "National Cultural Ecosystem Conservation Area" will only be granted upon completion of the project, subject to inspection and acceptance by the Ministry.

== List of National Cultural Ecosystem Conservation Areas ==
- Southern Fujian Cultural Ecosystem Conservation Area (Fujian)
- Huizhou Cultural Ecosystem Conservation Area (Anhui, Jiangxi)
- Rebgong Cultural Ecosystem Conservation Area (Qinghai)
- Qiang Cultural Ecosystem Conservation Area (Sichuan, Shaanxi)
- Wuling Mountains Region (Xiangxi) Tujia and Miao Cultural Ecosystem Conservation Area (Hunan)
- Marine Fishing Culture (Xiangshan) Eco-Conservation Area (Zhejiang)
- Qilu Culture (Weifang) Eco-Conservation Area (Shandong) (Qilu: an alternative name for Shandong Province)
- Qiandongnan Ethno-Cultural Ecosystems Conservation Area (Guizhou)
- Hakka Culture (Meizhou) Eco-Conservation Area (Guangdong)
- Dali Cultural Ecosystem Conservation Area (Yunnan)
- Northern Shaanxi Cultural Ecosystem Conservation Area (Yulin City and Yan'an City of Shaanxi Province)
- Central Shanxi Cultural Ecosystem Conservation Area (Jinzhong City, Taiyuan City and Lüliang City of Shanxi Province)
- Hakka Culture (Southern Jiangxi) Eco-Conservation Area (Jiangxi)
- Bronze Drum Culture (Hechi) Eco-Conservation Area (Guangxi)
- Dêqên Ethno-Cultural Ecosystems Conservation Area (Yunnan)
- Gêsar Culture (Golog) Eco-Conservation Area (Qinghai)
- Hakka Culture (Western Fujian) Eco-Conservation Area (Longyan City and Sanming City of Fujian Province)
- Storytelling and Ballad Singing Culture (Baofeng) Eco-Conservation Area (Henan)
- Wuling Mountains Region (Southwestern Hubei) Tujia and Miao Cultural Ecosystem Conservation Area (Yichang City and Enshi Tujia and Miao Autonomous Prefecture of Hubei Province)
- Wuling Mountains Region (Southeastern Chongqing) Tujia and Miao Cultural Ecosystem Conservation Area (Chongqing)
- Tibetan Culture (Yushu) Eco-Conservation Area (Qinghai)

== List of National Cultural Ecosystem Conservation Experimental Areas ==
- Heluo Culture Eco-Conservation Experimental Area (Henan)
- Jingdezhen Ceramic Culture Eco-Conservation Experimental Area (Jiangxi)

== See also ==
- List of protected areas of China
