= Jainca County =

Jainca 尖扎县 · གཅན་ཚ་རྫོང་། Chentsa, Jainzha
- County
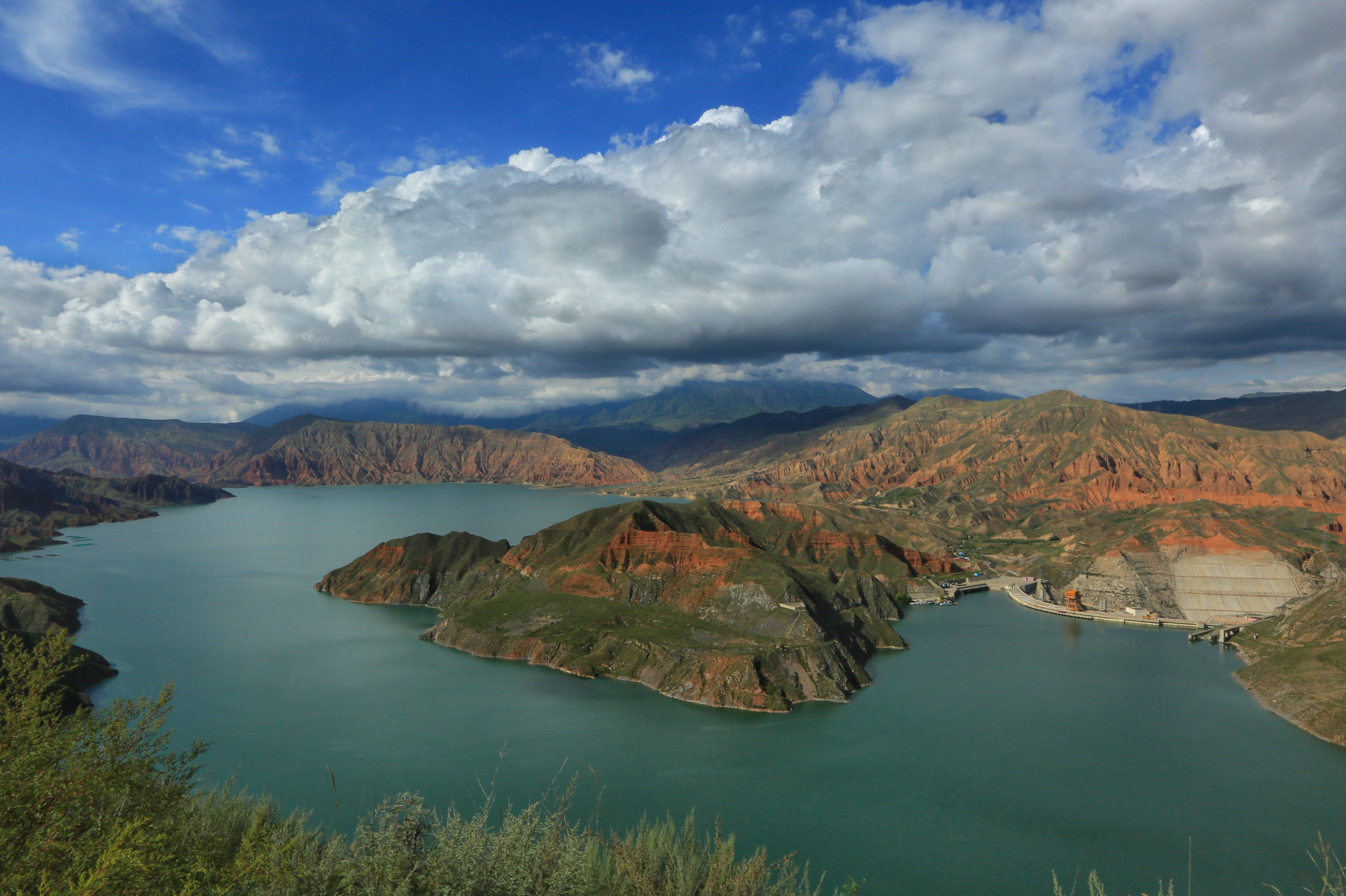
- Lijiaxia lake in Janica

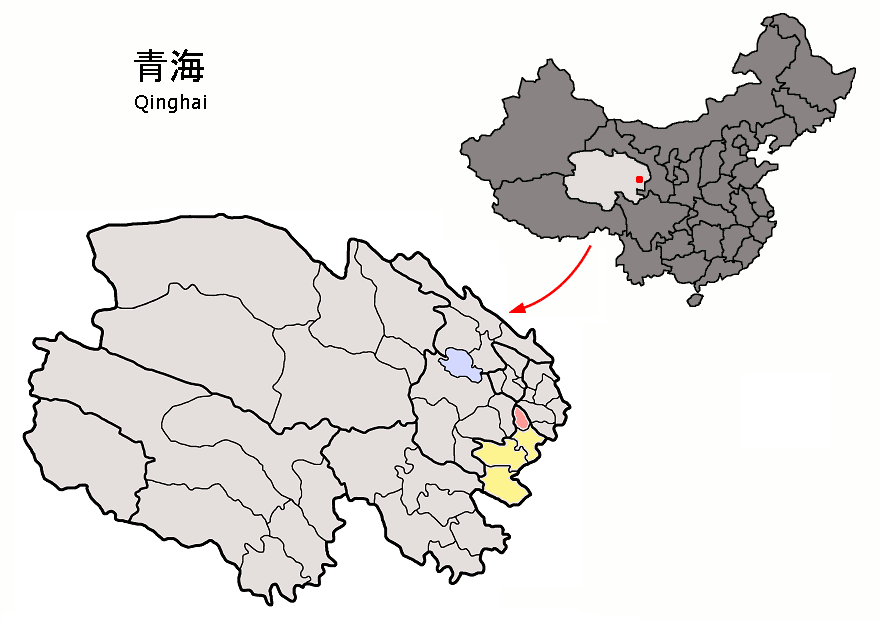
- Jainca County (light red) within Huangnan Prefecture (yellow) and Qinghai

- Location of the seat in Qinghai
- Coordinates: 35°56′18″N 102°02′00″E
- Country: China
- Province: Qinghai
- Autonomous prefecture: Huangnan
- County seat: Markhu Thang

Area
  - Total: 1,714 km^{2} (662 sq mi)
- Elevation: 1,990 m (6,530 ft)

Population (2020)
  - Total: 58,173
  - Density: 33.94/km^{2} (87.90/sq mi)
- Time zone: UTC+8 (China Standard)
- Postal code: 811200
- Area code: 0973
- Website: www.jianzha.gov.cn

Jainca County

Chinese name
- Simplified Chinese: 尖扎县
- Traditional Chinese: 尖扎縣
Transcriptions
Standard Mandarin
- Hanyu Pinyin: Jiānzhā Xiàn

Tibetan name
- Tibetan: གཅན་ཚ་རྫོང་།
Transcriptions
- Wylie: gcan tsha rdzong
- Tibetan Pinyin: Jainca Zong

Jainca County, Chentsa County or Jainzha County (Tibetan: གཅན་ཚ།, Wylie: gcan tsha; Chinese: 尖扎县; pinyin: Jiānzhā Xiàn) is a county in Huangnan Tibetan Autonomous Prefecture in Qinghai Province, China, to Tibetans in the area known as Malho Prefecture, part of Amdo. There are six townships, three towns and a total of 79 administrative villages in Chentsa county. The county has an area of 1,714 square kilometres (662 sq mi) and a population of ~50,000 (2001), 67% Tibetan. The county seat is the town of Markhu Thang.

== Administrative divisions ==
Jainca County is made up of 3 towns and 6 townships:

Name	Simplified Chinese	Hanyu Pinyin	Tibetan	Wylie	Administrative division code
Towns
Markhu Thang Town (Markutang, Magitang, Maketang)	马克堂镇	Mǎkètáng Zhèn	མར་ཁུ་ཐང་གྲོང་བརྡལ།	mar khu thang grong brdal	632322100
Kangyang Town (Dongna)	康扬镇	Kāngyáng Zhèn	གདོང་སྣ་གྲོང་བརྡལ།	gdong sna grong brdal	632322101
Kamra Town (Kanbula)	坎布拉镇	Kǎnbùlā Zhèn	ཁམས་ར་གྲོང་རྡལ།	khams ra grong rdal	632322102
Townships
Gya'gya Township (Jiajia)	贾加乡	Jiǎjiā Xiāng	སྐྱ་རྒྱ་ཞང་།	skya rgya zhang	632322200
Cozhug Township (Cuozhou)	措周乡	Cuòzhōu Xiāng	ཚོ་དྲུག་ཞང་།	tsho drug zhang	632322201
Nangra Township (Angla)	昂拉乡	Ánglā Xiāng	སྣང་ར་ཞང་།	snang ra zhang	632322202
Nangkog Township (Nengke)	能科乡	Néngkē Xiāng	ནང་ཁོག་ཞང་།	nang khog zhang	632322203
Dêngso Township (Dangshun)	当顺乡	Dàngshùn Xiāng	སྟེང་སོ་ཞང་།	steng so zhang	632322204
Jaincatang Township (Jianzhatan)	尖扎滩乡	Jiānzhātān Xiāng	གཅན་ཚ་ཐང་ཞང་།	gcan tsha thang zhang	632322205

== Climate ==
Jainca County has a cold semi-arid climate (Köppen BSk) and it set the record high temperature of Qinghai, at 40.3 °C (104.5 °F), on July 24, 2000.

Climate data for Jainca County, elevation 2,086 m (6,844 ft), (1991–2020 normals, extremes 1981–2010)
Month	Jan	Feb	Mar	Apr	May	Jun	Jul	Aug	Sep	Oct	Nov	Dec	Year
Record high °C (°F)	12.7 (54.9)	18.2 (64.8)	29.5 (85.1)	34.5 (94.1)	31.6 (88.9)	33.1 (91.6)	40.3 (104.5)	36.0 (96.8)	31.9 (89.4)	26.0 (78.8)	18.9 (66.0)	12.8 (55.0)	40.3 (104.5)
Mean daily maximum °C (°F)	3.1 (37.6)	7.2 (45.0)	13.0 (55.4)	18.9 (66.0)	22.2 (72.0)	25.2 (77.4)	27.2 (81.0)	26.3 (79.3)	21.4 (70.5)	16.2 (61.2)	10.3 (50.5)	4.5 (40.1)	16.3 (61.3)
Daily mean °C (°F)	−4.7 (23.5)	−0.6 (30.9)	5.2 (41.4)	11.1 (52.0)	14.9 (58.8)	18.2 (64.8)	20.1 (68.2)	19.3 (66.7)	14.8 (58.6)	8.9 (48.0)	2.2 (36.0)	−3.5 (25.7)	8.8 (47.9)
Mean daily minimum °C (°F)	−10.5 (13.1)	−6.6 (20.1)	−0.8 (30.6)	4.6 (40.3)	8.6 (47.5)	12.0 (53.6)	14.2 (57.6)	13.8 (56.8)	10.0 (50.0)	3.6 (38.5)	−3.7 (25.3)	−9.2 (15.4)	3.0 (37.4)
Record low °C (°F)	−18.8 (−1.8)	−16.4 (2.5)	−13.7 (7.3)	−6.8 (19.8)	−1.5 (29.3)	3.5 (38.3)	5.6 (42.1)	6.9 (44.4)	1.2 (34.2)	−7.5 (18.5)	−14.0 (6.8)	−18.7 (−1.7)	−18.8 (−1.8)
Average precipitation mm (inches)	0.8 (0.03)	1.0 (0.04)	4.4 (0.17)	15.5 (0.61)	46.5 (1.83)	55.0 (2.17)	74.7 (2.94)	77.6 (3.06)	59.2 (2.33)	18.5 (0.73)	1.3 (0.05)	0.3 (0.01)	354.8 (13.97)
Average precipitation days (≥ 0.1 mm)	1.0	1.4	3.2	5.3	10.0	13.3	13.4	12.1	12.9	7.1	1.5	0.5	81.7
Average snowy days	2.1	2.8	3.9	1.3	0.1	0	0	0	0	0.7	2.1	1.6	14.6
Average relative humidity (%)	39	37	38	39	48	54	59	60	64	58	46	41	49
Mean monthly sunshine hours	205.4	203.9	233.3	243.5	246.4	230.1	239.0	229.2	186.8	210.4	213.0	207.7	2,648.7
Percentage possible sunshine	66	66	62	62	56	53	54	56	51	61	70	69	61
Source: China Meteorological Administration

== See also ==
- Amdo Jampa
- List of administrative divisions of Qinghai
