= Kangyang, Qinghai =

Kangyang 康扬镇
- Town
- Kangyangzhen
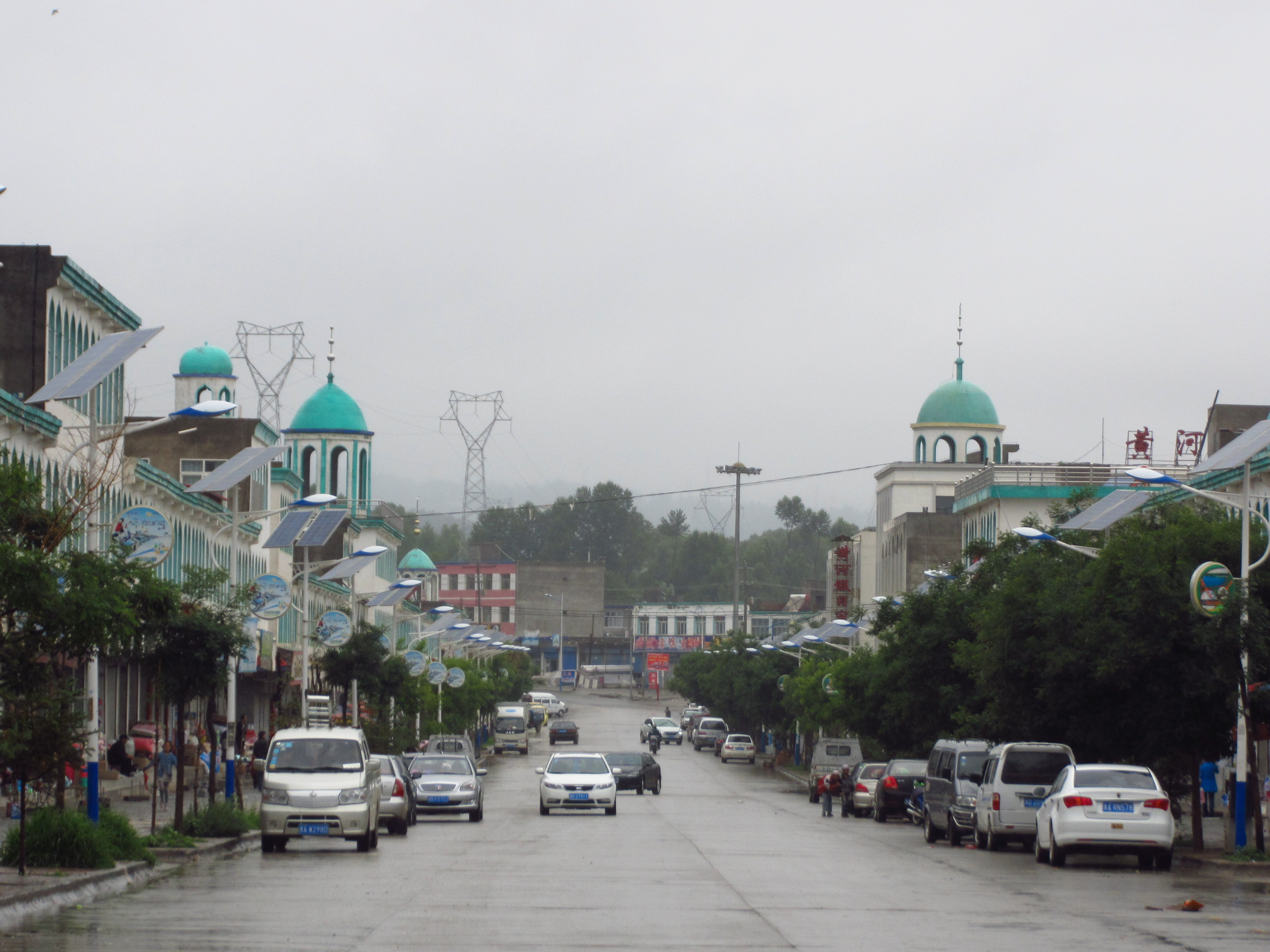
- Main street through Kangyang

- Location in Qinghai
- Coordinates: 36°3′53″N 101°55′17″E
- Country: People's Republic of China
- Province: Qinghai
- Autonomous prefecture: Huangnan Tibetan Autonomous Prefecture
- County: Jainca County

Area
  - Total: 32.07 km^{2} (12.38 sq mi)

Population (2010)
  - Total: 8,182
  - Density: 255.1/km^{2} (660.8/sq mi)
- Time zone: UTC+8 (China Standard)
- Postal code: 810904
- Local dialing code: 974

Kangyang (Mandarin: 康扬镇) is a town in Jainca County, Huangnan Tibetan Autonomous Prefecture, Qinghai, China. In 2010, Kangyang had a total population of 8,182 people: 4,023 males and 4,159 females: 2,096 under 14 years old, 5,584 aged between 15 and 64 and 502 over 65 years old.
