= Hainan Li and Miao Autonomous Prefecture =

Historical administrative division of China

Hainan Li-Miao Autonomous Prefecture (Chinese: 海南黎族苗族自治州; pinyin: Hǎinán Lízú Miáozú Zìzhìzhōu) was an autonomous prefecture in Guangdong Province, People's Republic of China from 1952 to 1988. It was located on Hainan Island and was the home of the majority of the Hlai people, a recognized ethnic minority. The area now belongs to Hainan Province, which was created in 1988.

== See also ==
- Baisha Li Autonomous County
- Baoting Li and Miao Autonomous County
- Changjiang Li Autonomous County
- Ledong Li Autonomous County
- Lingshui Li Autonomous County
- Qiongzhong Li and Miao Autonomous County
