= Henan Mongol Autonomous County =

Henan County
- Autonomous County
- Henan Mongol Autonomous County 河南蒙古族自治县 ᠾᠧᠨᠠᠨ ᠶᠢᠨ ᠮᠣᠩᠭᠣᠯ ᠦᠨᠳᠦᠰᠦᠲᠡᠨ ᠦ ᠥᠪᠡᠷᠲᠡᠭᠡᠨ ᠵᠠᠰᠠᠬᠤ ᠰᠢᠶᠠᠨ རྨ་ལྷོ་སོག་རིགས་རང་སྐྱོང་རྫོང་།
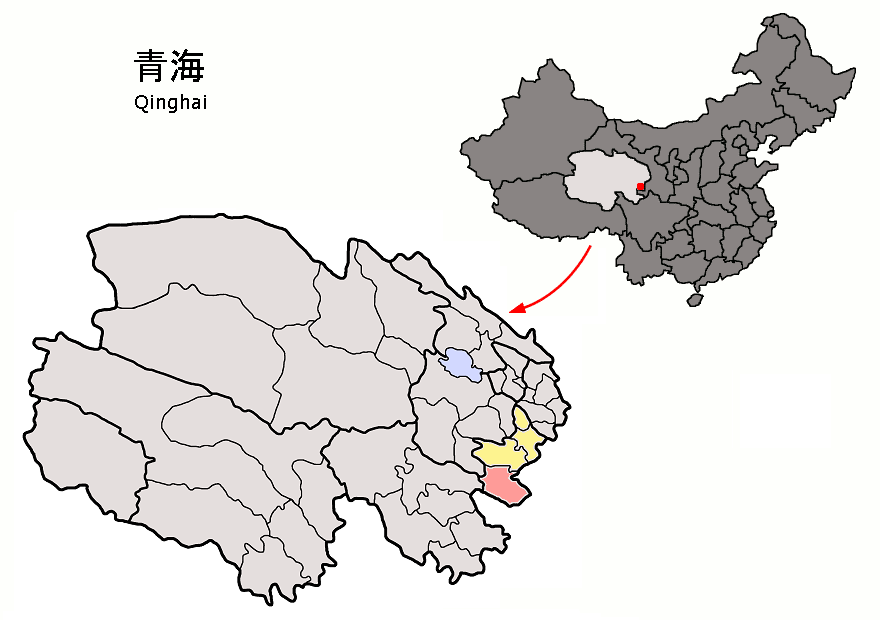
- Location of Henan County (red) in Huangnan Prefecture (yellow) and Qinghai

- Location of the seat in Qinghai
- Coordinates (Henan County government): 34°44′05″N 101°37′04″E
- Country: China
- Province: Qinghai
- Autonomous prefecture: Huangnan
- County seat: Yêgainnyin Town

Area
  - Total: 6,250 km^{2} (2,410 sq mi)

Population (2020)
  - Total: 40,864
  - Density: 5.16/km^{2} (13.4/sq mi)
- Time zone: UTC+8 (China Standard)
- Website: www.henanxian.gov.cn

Henan Mongol Autonomous County

Chinese name
- Simplified Chinese: 河南蒙古族自治县
- Traditional Chinese: 河南蒙古族自治縣
Transcriptions
Standard Mandarin
- Hanyu Pinyin: Hénán Ménggǔ Zìzhìxiàn
Yue: Cantonese
- Jyutping: ho^{4}naam^{4} mung^{4}gu^{2}zuk^{6} zi^{6}zi^{6}jyun^{2}

Tibetan name
- Tibetan: རྨ་ལྷོ་སོག་རིགས་རང་སྐྱོང་རྫོང་།
Transcriptions
- Wylie: rma lho sog rigs rang skyong rdzong
- Tibetan Pinyin: Malho Sogrig Ranggyong Zong

Mongolian name
- Mongolian Cyrillic: Хөнаний Монгол үндэстний өөртөө засах шянь
- Mongolian script: ᠾᠧᠨᠠᠨ ᠶᠢᠨ ᠮᠣᠩᠭᠣᠯ ᠦᠨᠳᠦᠰᠦᠲᠡᠨ ᠦ ᠥᠪᠡᠷᠲᠡᠭᠡᠨ ᠵᠠᠰᠠᠬᠤ ᠰᠢᠶᠠᠨ

Henan Mongol Autonomous County is an autonomous county in the south of Huangnan Tibetan Autonomous Prefecture in the province of Qinghai, China, bordering Gansu Province to the south and east. Its administrative seat ("capital") is the town of Yêgainnyin (Youganning). Henan has an area of 6,250 km^{2} (2,410 sq mi) and approximately 30,000 inhabitants (2004). The Mongols or Upper Mongols (Sogwo Arig), the overwhelming majority of the inhabitants of the county, do not speak Mongolian (with relatively few exceptions) and speak primarily Standard Chinese and Tibetan.

== Administrative divisions ==
Henan County is made up of 2 towns and 4 townships:

Name	Simplified Chinese	Hanyu Pinyin	Tibetan	Wylie	Mongolian (Hudum Script)	Mongolian (Cyrillic)	Administrative division code
Towns
Yêgainnyin Town	优干宁镇	Yōugànníng Zhèn	གཡུ་སྒང་ཉིན་གྲོང་རྡལ།	g.yu sgang nyin grong rdal	ᠶᠧᠦ ᠭᠠᠨ ᠨᠢᠩ ᠪᠠᠯᠭᠠᠰᠤ	Ево ган нин балгас	632324100
Nyimta Town	宁木特镇	Níngmùtè Zhèn	ཉིན་མཐའ་གྲོང་བརྡལ།	nyin mtha' grong brdal	ᠨᠢᠮᠳᠠ ᠪᠠᠯᠭᠠᠰᠤ	Нямд балгас	632324101
Townships
Dosum Township	多松乡	Duōsōng Xiāng	མདོ་གསུམ་ཞང་།	mdo gsum zhang	ᠳᠣᠬᠰᠤᠮ ᠰᠢᠶᠠᠩ	Тогсм шиян	632324201
Sêrlung Township	赛尔龙乡	Sài'ěrlóng Xiāng	གསེར་ལུང་ཞང་།	gser lung zhang	ᠰᠠᠷᠯᠦᠩ ᠰᠢᠶᠠᠩ	Сарлан шиян	632324202
Kosag Township	柯生乡	Kēshēng Xiāng	ཁིས་སིན་ཞང་།	khis sin zhang	ᠬᠦᠢᠰᠦᠨ ᠰᠢᠶᠠᠩ	Хүйсэн шиян	632324203
Toyêma Township	托叶玛乡	Tuōyèmǎ Xiāng	མཐོ་ཡུལ་མ་ཞང་།	mtho yul ma zhang	ᠲᠣᠶᠢᠮ᠎ᠠ ᠰᠢᠶᠠᠩ	Доём шиян	632324204

== Ethnic groups in Henan, 2000 census ==
Nationality	Population	Percentage
Mongol	28,879	89.55%
Han	1,444	4.48%
Tibetan	863	2.68%
Hui	821	2.54%
Tu	144	0.45%
Salar	45	0.14%
Bai	19	0.06%
Bonan	13	0.04%
Dongxiang	11	0.03%
Yi	6	0.02%
Others	5	0.02%

== Climate ==
Climate data for Henan Mongol Autonomous County, elevation 3,500 m (11,500 ft), (1991–2020 normals, extremes 1981–2010)
Month	Jan	Feb	Mar	Apr	May	Jun	Jul	Aug	Sep	Oct	Nov	Dec	Year
Record high °C (°F)	12.2 (54.0)	14.1 (57.4)	18.4 (65.1)	22.5 (72.5)	22.4 (72.3)	23.3 (73.9)	26.2 (79.2)	24.9 (76.8)	25.1 (77.2)	21.7 (71.1)	14.0 (57.2)	12.1 (53.8)	26.2 (79.2)
Mean daily maximum °C (°F)	−0.8 (30.6)	2.0 (35.6)	5.4 (41.7)	9.7 (49.5)	12.6 (54.7)	15.0 (59.0)	17.5 (63.5)	17.4 (63.3)	14.1 (57.4)	8.9 (48.0)	4.4 (39.9)	0.8 (33.4)	8.9 (48.1)
Daily mean °C (°F)	−12.4 (9.7)	−8.5 (16.7)	−3.5 (25.7)	1.7 (35.1)	5.3 (41.5)	8.7 (47.7)	10.7 (51.3)	10.2 (50.4)	6.8 (44.2)	0.9 (33.6)	−5.9 (21.4)	−11.2 (11.8)	0.2 (32.4)
Mean daily minimum °C (°F)	−21.7 (−7.1)	−17.4 (0.7)	−10.9 (12.4)	−5.0 (23.0)	−0.8 (30.6)	3.2 (37.8)	4.9 (40.8)	4.3 (39.7)	1.4 (34.5)	−4.7 (23.5)	−13.3 (8.1)	−20.2 (−4.4)	−6.7 (20.0)
Record low °C (°F)	−37.2 (−35.0)	−33.4 (−28.1)	−29.0 (−20.2)	−19.2 (−2.6)	−11.9 (10.6)	−6.2 (20.8)	−4.0 (24.8)	−7.4 (18.7)	−9.9 (14.2)	−18.2 (−0.8)	−26.9 (−16.4)	−35.3 (−31.5)	−37.2 (−35.0)
Average precipitation mm (inches)	5.7 (0.22)	6.9 (0.27)	14.5 (0.57)	27.2 (1.07)	71.8 (2.83)	97.6 (3.84)	109.0 (4.29)	99.9 (3.93)	91.0 (3.58)	38.1 (1.50)	6.1 (0.24)	2.5 (0.10)	570.3 (22.44)
Average precipitation days (≥ 0.1 mm)	4.7	5.8	9.2	11.3	17.2	18.9	17.9	16.7	17.0	13.5	4.0	2.7	138.9
Average snowy days	6.3	8.4	11.7	12.8	10.6	1.6	0.2	0.4	3.3	13.5	5.9	4.0	78.7
Average relative humidity (%)	53	52	54	59	66	71	74	75	76	70	60	53	64
Mean monthly sunshine hours	215.0	197.5	219.8	231.6	215.7	191.6	210.3	208.9	172.8	196.2	225.0	227.2	2,511.6
Percentage possible sunshine	68	63	59	59	50	44	48	51	47	57	73	75	58
Source: China Meteorological Administration

== See also ==
- List of administrative divisions of Qinghai
