= Amdo Jampa =

Tibetan painter (1911–2002)

Amdo Jampa (Tibetan: ཨ་མདོའི་བྱམས་པ, Wylie: a mdo'i byams pa; 1911 – 28 March 2002), also known as Jampa Tseten (Tibetan: བྱམས་པ་ཚེ་བརྟན, Wylie: byams pa tshe brtan), was a Tibetan painter.

== Biography ==
Amdo Jampa was born in Chentsa, Amdo, Tibet, in 1911. He was known for his photo-realistic style. He made famous portraits of the Dalai Lama and the Panchen Lama.

He was one of the first Tibetan artists to study at a Chinese art college.

He was a student of the Tibetan scholar and artist Gendün Chöphel.

As a teenager, he became a monk at Drepung Monastery and study traditional Tibetan thangka painting. He left Drepung when he accompanied the Dalai Lama to Beijing in 1954.

There, he studied traditional Chinese painting and Western painting techniques under the guidance of the Chinese teacher Li Zhongjin.

When he came back in Lhasa in 1956, he was commissioned to paint in the Tagtu Mingyur Podrang new palace recently completed in the Norbulingka. His murals merged a traditional Tibetan style with a modern one. The innovation he introduced was that his portraits were easily recognisable.

The Choekyi Gyaltsen, 10th Panchen Lama, later asked Amdo Jampa a portrait, which he also realised in realist style.

Amdo Jampa travelled to India in the 1980s. He performed paintings for religious buildings for the Dalai Lama in Dharamshala.

He returned to Lhasa, Tibet. According to Drangchar, a Tibetan magazine, he occupied the official positions of Chairman of the Tibet Fine Arts Association and Chief Research Officer of the Central Executive Committee of the Tibet Autonomous Museum of Cultural Artefacts. He opened an art school in Shol village, before the Potala Palace.

Amdo Jampa's paintings spread in Tibet and influenced Tibetan contemporary painting. Hence, before 1996 when the Chinese ban on Dalai Lama pictures, many monasteries had such a picture in the style of Amdo Jampa's famous painting of the Dalai Lama.

According to Gonkar Gyatso, a Tibetan artist from Lhasa now in the UK, Amdo Jampa is the most important Tibetan modern artist. He was trained in the 1950s at thangka painting and he was the only one to perform original works different from traditional painting and had the support of the 14th Dalai Lama for his creative work. His paintings were partly influenced by painters such as Vittore Carpaccio.

For Jamyang Norbu, Amdo Jampa was influenced by Gendun Choephel who travelled in India and knew Indian Buddhist and Hindu art as well as European art, as seen in his nudes and dancers. Like other Tibetan artists, Amdo Jampa did not produce anything during the Cultural Revolution years.

Even at an old age, Amdo Jampa walked every day around Lhasa, performing a kora. He died on 28 March 2002, in Lhasa, Tibet Autonomous Region, China. He was survived by his wife, 2 daughters and 2 sons.
