= Rongwo Monastery =

Tibetan Buddhist monastery

Coordinates: 35°30′32″N 102°00′27″E

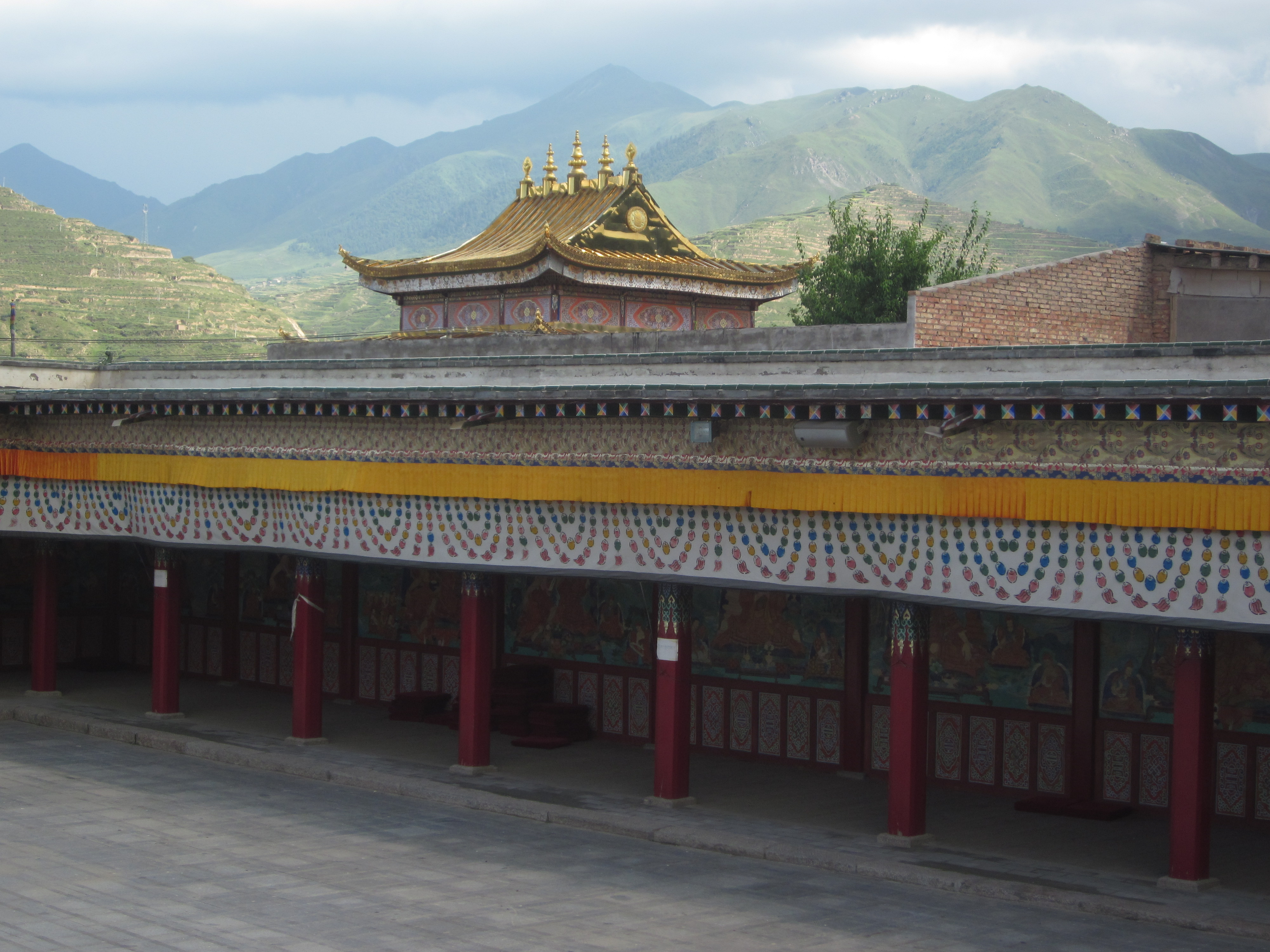
View of the Rongwo Monastery.

Rongwo Monastery (Tibetan: རོང་བོ་དགོན་ཆེན, Wylie: rong bo dgon chen, formally Wylie: rong po dgon chen thos bsam rnam rgyal gling, simplified Chinese: 隆务寺; traditional Chinese: 隆務寺; pinyin: Lóngwù sì), is a Tibetan Buddhist monastery in Tongren County, Huangnan Tibetan Autonomous Prefecture, Qinghai, China. It is 186 kilometres (116 mi) from Xining.

== Name ==
The monastery is named after the Rongwo River upon which it is located.

== History ==
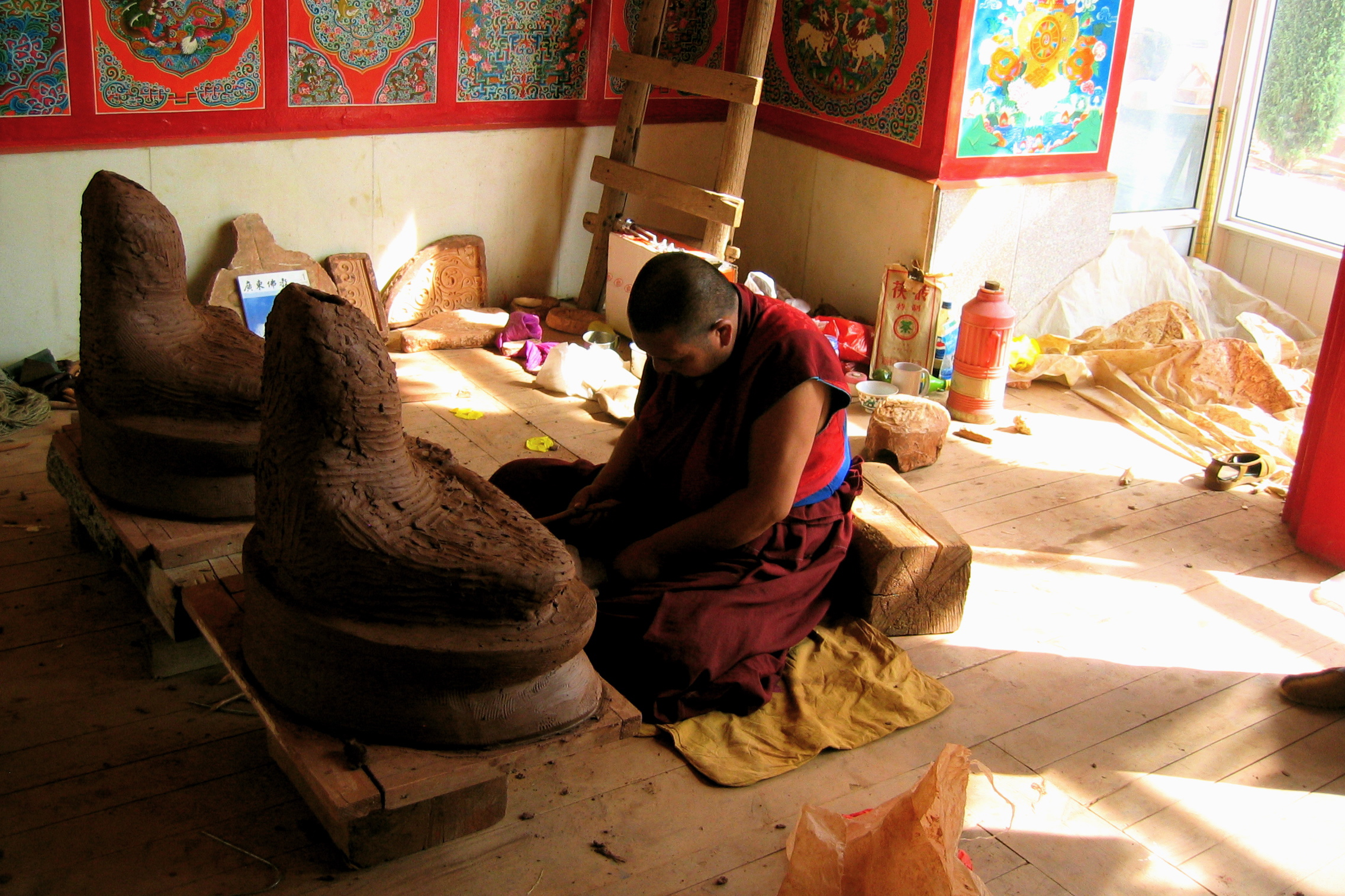
New statues being created - thangka paintings can be seen in the background

Rongwo Monastery was initially established as a three monastery site in 1341 in by Rongwo Samten Rinpoche. Samten's younger brother was the architect and designer of the monasteries. The first monastery built was the Temple of 3 Buddhas and then the Golden Temple and other temples. Shartsang Kaldan Gyatso (1607-1677) is recognized as the 1st re-incarnation of Rongwo Samten Rinpoche and was the founder of the current monastery on the temples' sites. The 8th re-incarnation of Shartsang Rinpoche was recognized and installed in October 1991. Yarba Chogyi built the prayer hall, the Victory Stupa and the stupas at the 4 corners of the monastery, had the sayings of Buddha written in gold, and commissioned the statues of Je Tsongkhapa. Shartsang Kaldan Gyatso established the first monastic college, Tsennyi Tratsang, in which Buddhist dialectics, vinaya, Madhyamika philosophy, Prajnaparamita, and Abhidharma are still currently taught, in 1630. Following multiple subsequent re-incarnations, the 7th incarnation of Shartsang Rinpoche, Lobsang Trinley Lungtok Gyatso, increased the number of colleges to the present: the Tsennyi Tratsang, the Gyamat Tratsang (tantric College, where tantric scriptures and practices are taught) and the Duikor Tratsang, a monastic college of the wheel of time that is also known as the College of Kalachakra, the 10 syllable mantra. This information was provided at the monastery in June 2006 and is translated from their official documents.
