= Tongren, Qinghai =

Tongren 同仁市 · ཐུང་རིན་གྲོང་ཁྱེར། Rebgong
- County-level city
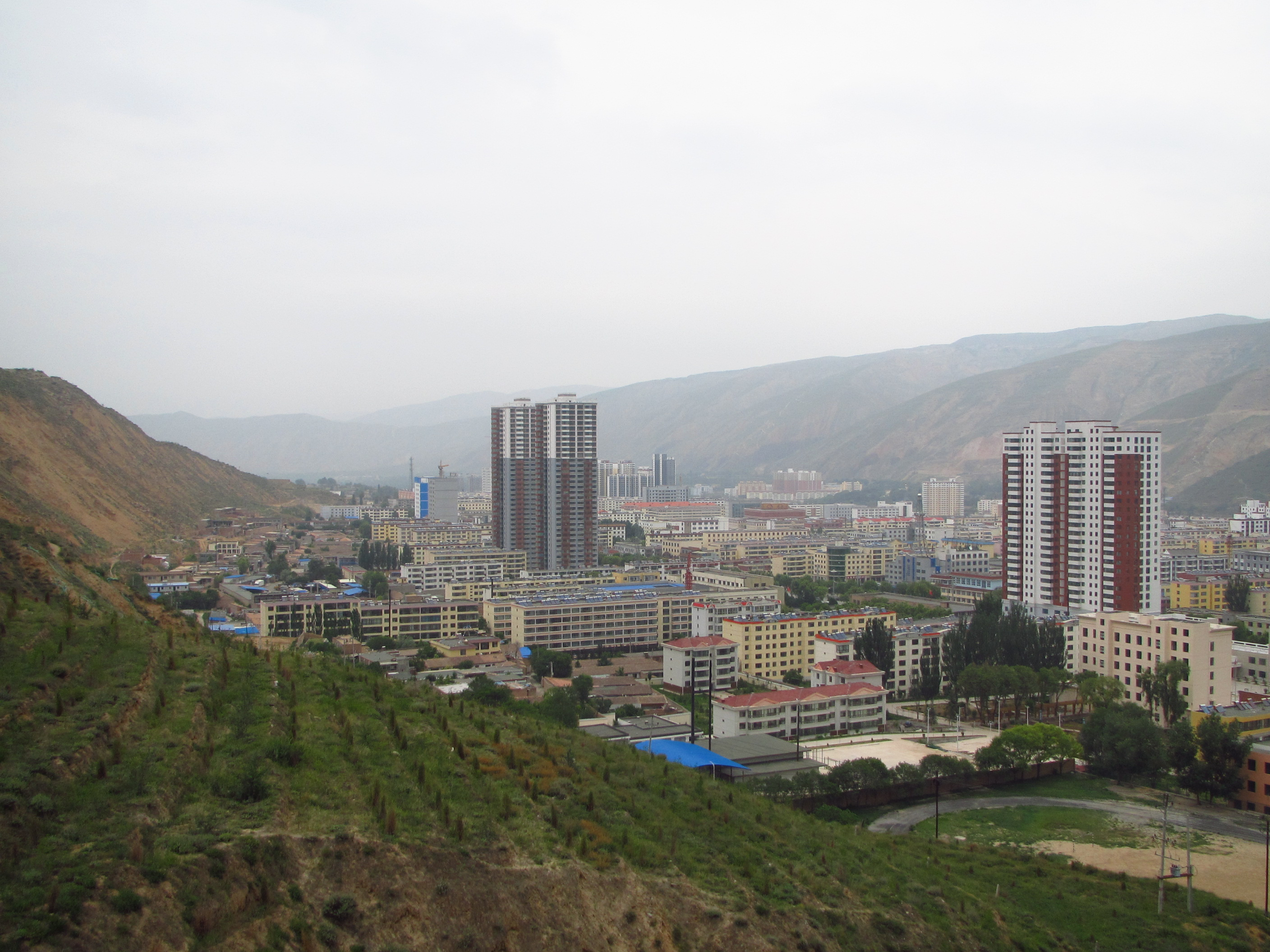
- Tongren from above

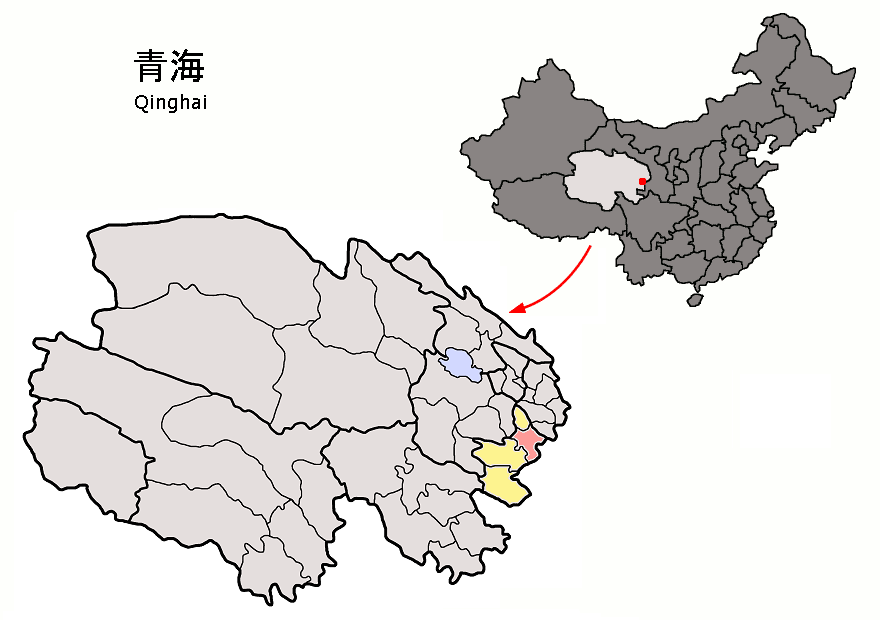
- Tongren (light red) within Huangnan Prefecture (yellow) and Qinghai

- Location of the seat in Qinghai
- Coordinates (Tongren County government): 35°30′58″N 102°01′06″E
- Country: China
- Province: Qinghai
- Autonomous prefecture: Huangnan
- Municipal seat: Longwu (Rongwo)

Area
  - Total: 3,275 km^{2} (1,264 sq mi)
- Elevation: 2,480 m (8,140 ft)

Population (2020)
  - Total: 101,519
  - Density: 31.00/km^{2} (80.28/sq mi)
- Time zone: UTC+8 (China Standard)
- Postal code: 811399
- Area code: 0973
- Website: www.hntongren.gov.cn

Tongren, Qinghai

Chinese name
- Chinese: 同仁市
Transcriptions
Standard Mandarin
- Hanyu Pinyin: Tóngrén Shì

Tibetan name
- Tibetan: ཐུན་རིན་གྲོང་ཁྱེར། or རེབ་གོང་གྲོང་ཁྱེར།
Transcriptions
- Wylie: thun rin grong khyer or reb gong grong khyer

Tongren (Tibetan: ཐུན་རིན་, Wylie: thun rin; Chinese: 同仁; pinyin: Tóngrén), known to Tibetans as Rebgong (Tibetan: རེབ་གོང་, རེབ་ཀོང་ or རེབ་སྐོང་, Amdo Tibetan pronunciation: [ɾɛʋ koŋ]) in the historic region of Amdo, is the capital and second smallest administrative subdivision by area within Huangnan Tibetan Autonomous Prefecture in Qinghai, China.

The city has an area of 3465 square kilometers and a population of ~80,000 (2002), 75% Tibetan. The economy of the city includes agriculture and aluminium mining.

== Administrative divisions ==
Tongren is made up of 3 towns and 8 townships:

Name	Simplified Chinese	Hanyu Pinyin	Tibetan	Wylie	Administrative division code
Towns
Longwu Town (Rongwo Town)	隆务镇	Lóngwù Zhèn	རོང་བོ་གྲོང་རྡལ།	rong bo grong rdal	632301100
Bao'an Town (Tokya Town)	保安镇	Bǎo'ān Zhèn	ཐོ་ཀྱཱ་གྲོང་རྡལ།	tho kyā grong rdal	632301101
Dowa Town	多哇镇	Duōwā Zhèn	མདོ་བ་གྲོང་རྡལ།	mdo ba grong rdal	632301102
Townships
Lancai Township (Loinqê Township)	兰采乡	Láncǎi Xiāng	བློན་ཆོས་ཞང་།	blon chos zhang	632301200
Shuangpengxi Township (Xo'ongjê Township)	双朋西乡	Shuāngpéngxī Xiāng	ཞོ་འོང་དཔྱེལ་ཞང་།	zho 'ong dpyel zhang	632301201
Zainmo Township (Zhamao Township)	扎毛乡	Zhāmáo Xiāng	བཙན་མོ་ཞང་།	btsan mo zhang	632301202
Hornag Township (Huangnaihai Township)	黄乃亥乡	Huángnǎihài Xiāng	ཧོར་ནག་ཞང་།	hor nag zhang	632301203
Qokog Township (Qukuhu Township)	曲库乎乡	Qǔkùhū Xiāng	ཆུ་ཁོག་ཞང་།	chu khog zhang	632301204
Nyaintog Township (Nianduhu Township)	年都乎乡	Niándūhū Xiāng	གཉན་ཐོག་ཞང་།	gnyan thog zhang	632301205
Garzê Township (Guashize Township)	瓜什则乡	Guāshízé Xiāng	འགར་རྩེ་ཞང་།	'gar rtse zhang	632301206
Gyaiwo Township (Jiawu Township)	加吾乡	Jiāwú Xiāng	རྒྱལ་བོ་ཞང་།	rgyal bo zhang	632301207

== Demographics and languages ==
The Amdo Tibetan is the lingua franca of Tongren and the surrounding region, which is populated by Tibetan and Hui people, as well as some Han Chinese and Mongols.

The Wutun language, a Chinese-Bonan-Tibetan mixed language, is spoken by some 2,000 people in the two villages of Upper and Lower Wutun, located on the eastern bank of the Rongwo River.

== Culture ==
The city has a number of Tibetan Buddhist temples and gompas, including the large and significant Rongwo Monastery of the Gelug school. It is known as a center of thangka painting. Regong arts were named on the UNESCO Intangible Cultural Heritage Lists in 2009.

In October 2010 there were reports of large demonstrations in Tongren by Tibetan students who reportedly shouted the slogans, “equality of ethnic groups” and “freedom of language."

== Climate ==
Tongren has a highland humid continental climate (Köppen Dwb).

Climate data for Tongren, elevation 2,475 m (8,120 ft), (1991–2020 normals, extremes 1981–2010)
Month	Jan	Feb	Mar	Apr	May	Jun	Jul	Aug	Sep	Oct	Nov	Dec	Year
Record high °C (°F)	15.1 (59.2)	21.6 (70.9)	27.0 (80.6)	32.7 (90.9)	30.9 (87.6)	31.3 (88.3)	35.0 (95.0)	34.2 (93.6)	32.5 (90.5)	23.4 (74.1)	19.8 (67.6)	13.9 (57.0)	35.0 (95.0)
Mean daily maximum °C (°F)	1.5 (34.7)	5.5 (41.9)	11.0 (51.8)	16.4 (61.5)	19.3 (66.7)	22.0 (71.6)	24.1 (75.4)	23.7 (74.7)	19.0 (66.2)	14.0 (57.2)	8.5 (47.3)	3.0 (37.4)	14.0 (57.2)
Daily mean °C (°F)	−6.1 (21.0)	−2.5 (27.5)	2.9 (37.2)	8.5 (47.3)	12.2 (54.0)	15.3 (59.5)	17.4 (63.3)	16.7 (62.1)	12.5 (54.5)	6.8 (44.2)	0.6 (33.1)	−4.7 (23.5)	6.6 (43.9)
Mean daily minimum °C (°F)	−11.6 (11.1)	−8.4 (16.9)	−3.1 (26.4)	2.1 (35.8)	6.3 (43.3)	9.9 (49.8)	12.0 (53.6)	11.5 (52.7)	8.1 (46.6)	1.9 (35.4)	−4.7 (23.5)	−10.1 (13.8)	1.2 (34.1)
Record low °C (°F)	−22.6 (−8.7)	−19.5 (−3.1)	−15.0 (5.0)	−9.3 (15.3)	−3.7 (25.3)	1.2 (34.2)	4.3 (39.7)	2.3 (36.1)	−0.9 (30.4)	−10.5 (13.1)	−16.4 (2.5)	−21.5 (−6.7)	−22.6 (−8.7)
Average precipitation mm (inches)	2.8 (0.11)	4.2 (0.17)	10.5 (0.41)	24.5 (0.96)	56.9 (2.24)	59.4 (2.34)	84.3 (3.32)	77.8 (3.06)	68.6 (2.70)	25.4 (1.00)	4.1 (0.16)	1.0 (0.04)	419.5 (16.51)
Average precipitation days (≥ 0.1 mm)	3	3.3	5.2	7.8	12.8	15.1	16.0	13.9	14.3	8.5	2.4	1.3	103.6
Average snowy days	4.4	5.3	6.7	3.7	0.8	0	0	0	0.1	2.4	3.2	2.4	29
Average relative humidity (%)	41	41	42	45	53	60	64	65	68	61	48	41	52
Mean monthly sunshine hours	205.4	197.1	219.9	228.2	220.8	203.3	219.3	210.0	172.0	197.1	210.6	211.9	2,495.6
Percentage possible sunshine	66	63	59	58	51	47	50	51	47	57	69	70	57
Source: China Meteorological Administration

== See also ==
- List of administrative divisions of Qinghai
