= Huangnan Tibetan Autonomous Prefecture =

Huangnan Prefecture 黄南州 · རྨ་ལྷོ་ཁུལ། Malho
- Autonomous prefecture
- Huangnan Tibetan Autonomous Prefecture 黄南藏族自治州 · རྨ་ལྷོ་བོད་རིགས་རང་སྐྱོང་ཁུལ་
- Location of Huangnan Tibetan Autonomous Prefecture in Qinghai
- Coordinates: 35°31′09″N 102°00′55″E
- Country: People's Republic of China
- Province: Qinghai
- Prefecture seat: Tongren

Area
  - Total: 18,226 km^{2} (7,037 sq mi)
- Elevation: 3,194 m (10,479 ft)
- Highest elevation: 3,500 m (11,500 ft)
- Lowest elevation: 3,194 m (10,479 ft)

Population (2026)
  - Total: 276,215
  - Density: 15.155/km^{2} (39.251/sq mi)

GDP
  - Total: CN¥ 7.3 billion US$ 1.2 billion
  - Per capita: CN¥ 27,181; US$ 4,364
- Time zone: UTC+8 (China Standard)
- ISO 3166 code: CN-QH-23

Huangnan Tibetan Autonomous Prefecture (simplified Chinese: 黄南藏族自治州; traditional Chinese: 黃南藏族自治州; pinyin: Huángnán Zàngzú Zìzhìzhōu; Tibetan: རྨ་ལྷོ་བོད་རིགས་རང་སྐྱོང་ཁུལ་, Wylie: rma lho bod rigs rang skyong khul) is an autonomous prefecture of eastern Qinghai, northwest China, bordering Gansu to the east. The prefecture has an area of 17,921 km^{2} (6,919 sq mi) and its seat is in Tongren County.

== Demographics ==
According to the 2000 census, Huangnan has 214,642 inhabitants with a population density of 11.98 inhabitants/km^{2} (31.03 inhabitants/sq. mi.).

The ethnic composition in Huangnan according to the 2000 census was as follows:

Nationality	Population	Percentage
Tibetan	142,360	66.32%
Mongol	29,071	13.54%
Hui	16,411	7.65%
Han	16,194	7.54%
Tu/Monguor	8,445	3.93%
Salar	1,530	0.71%
Others	631	0.31%

== Climate ==
Climate data for Tongren County (1981–2010)
Month	Jan	Feb	Mar	Apr	May	Jun	Jul	Aug	Sep	Oct	Nov	Dec	Year
Record high °C (°F)	15.1 (59.2)	21.6 (70.9)	27.0 (80.6)	32.7 (90.9)	30.9 (87.6)	31.3 (88.3)	35.0 (95.0)	34.2 (93.6)	32.5 (90.5)	23.4 (74.1)	19.8 (67.6)	13.9 (57.0)	35.0 (95.0)
Mean daily maximum °C (°F)	1.3 (34.3)	4.8 (40.6)	10.1 (50.2)	15.7 (60.3)	18.9 (66.0)	21.3 (70.3)	23.5 (74.3)	23.4 (74.1)	18.7 (65.7)	13.6 (56.5)	8.1 (46.6)	2.7 (36.9)	13.5 (56.3)
Daily mean °C (°F)	−6.6 (20.1)	−3.2 (26.2)	2.0 (35.6)	7.8 (46.0)	11.9 (53.4)	14.7 (58.5)	16.7 (62.1)	16.1 (61.0)	12.0 (53.6)	6.3 (43.3)	0.1 (32.2)	−5.1 (22.8)	6.1 (42.9)
Mean daily minimum °C (°F)	−12.2 (10.0)	−9.2 (15.4)	−3.9 (25.0)	1.4 (34.5)	5.8 (42.4)	9.1 (48.4)	11.2 (52.2)	10.5 (50.9)	7.4 (45.3)	1.4 (34.5)	−5.4 (22.3)	−10.6 (12.9)	0.5 (32.8)
Record low °C (°F)	−22.6 (−8.7)	−19.5 (−3.1)	−15.0 (5.0)	−9.3 (15.3)	−3.7 (25.3)	1.2 (34.2)	4.3 (39.7)	2.3 (36.1)	−0.9 (30.4)	−10.5 (13.1)	−16.4 (2.5)	−21.5 (−6.7)	−22.6 (−8.7)
Average precipitation mm (inches)	2.5 (0.10)	3.9 (0.15)	11.0 (0.43)	22.6 (0.89)	58.0 (2.28)	64.5 (2.54)	80.4 (3.17)	70.8 (2.79)	65.1 (2.56)	25.9 (1.02)	3.1 (0.12)	0.8 (0.03)	408.6 (16.08)
Source: China Meteorological Administration

== Subdivisions ==
The prefecture is subdivided into 4 county-level divisions: 1 county-level city, 2 counties and 1 autonomous county:

Map
Name	Simplified Chinese	Hanyu Pinyin	Tibetan	Wylie Tibetan Pinyin	Population (2010 Census)	Area (km^{2})	Density (/km^{2})
Tongren city	同仁市	Tóngrén shì	Official: ཐུང་རིན་གྲོང་ཁྱེར། (རེབ་གོང་གྲོང་ཁྱེར། or རེ་སྐོང་གྲོང་ཁྱེར།)	thung rin grong khyer Tungrin Chongkyêr	92,601	3,465	26.72
Jainca County (Jianzha County)	尖扎县	Jiānzhā Xiàn	གཅན་ཚ་རྫོང་།	gcan tsha rdzong Jainca Zong	55,325	1,712	32.31
Zêkog County (Zeku County)	泽库县	Zékù Xiàn	རྩེ་ཁོག་རྫོང་།	rtse khog rdzong Zêkog Zong	69,416	6,494	10.68
Henan Mongol; Autonomous County	河南蒙古族 自治县	Hénán Měnggǔzú; Zìzhìxiàn	རྨ་ལྷོ་སོག་རིགས་རང་སྐྱོང་རྫོང་།	rma lho sog rigs rang skyong rdzong Malho Sogrig; Ranggyong Zong	39,374	6,250	6.29

== Rongwo Monastery ==
Huangnan is home to Rongwo Monastery, a Gelug monastery initially established in 1341 in Amdo on the Rongwo River.
