= Autonomous prefecture =

People's Republic of China prefecture-level subdivision

Autonomous Prefecture 自治州 Zìzhìzhōu
- Current autonomous prefectures (yellow)
- Category: Second-level administrative division of a unitary state
- Location: China
- Number: 30 (as of 1983)

Autonomous prefectures (Chinese: 自治州; pinyin: zìzhìzhōu) are one type of autonomous administrative division in China, existing at the prefectural level, with either ethnic minorities forming over 50% of the population or being, most commonly, the historic home of significant minorities. The official name of an autonomous prefecture includes the most significant minority in that region, sometimes two, rarely three. For example, a prefecture with a large number of Kazakhs (Kazak in official naming system) may be called a Kazak Autonomous Prefecture. Like all other prefectural level divisions, autonomous prefectures are divided into county level divisions. There is one exception: Ili Kazak Autonomous Prefecture contains two prefectures of its own. Under the Constitution of China, autonomous prefectures cannot be abolished.

== Autonomous administrative divisions ==
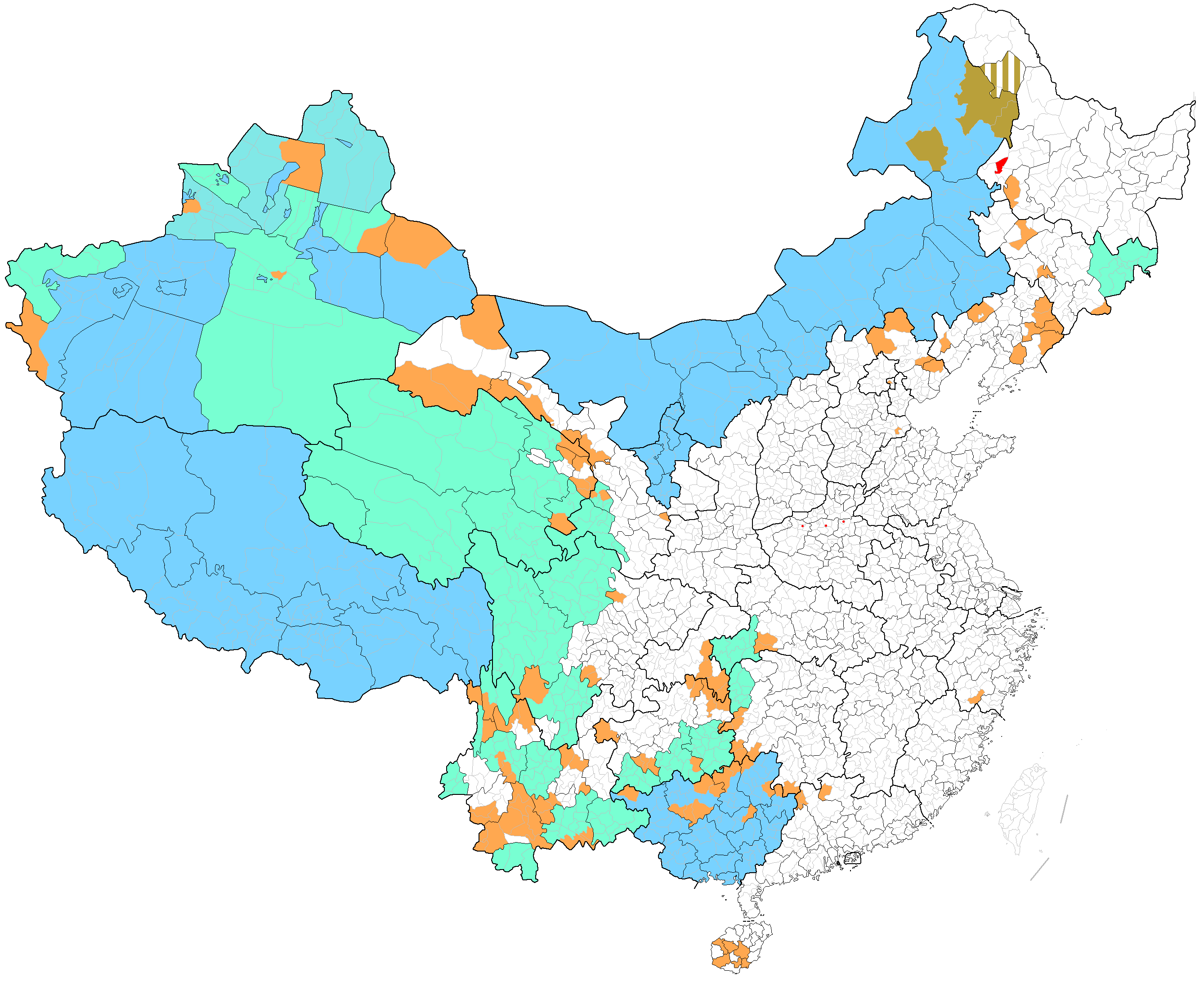
Map of all minority regions under autonomous rule designated by the Central Government Autonomous Region Autonomous Prefecture Autonomous County Autonomous Banner Ethnic district

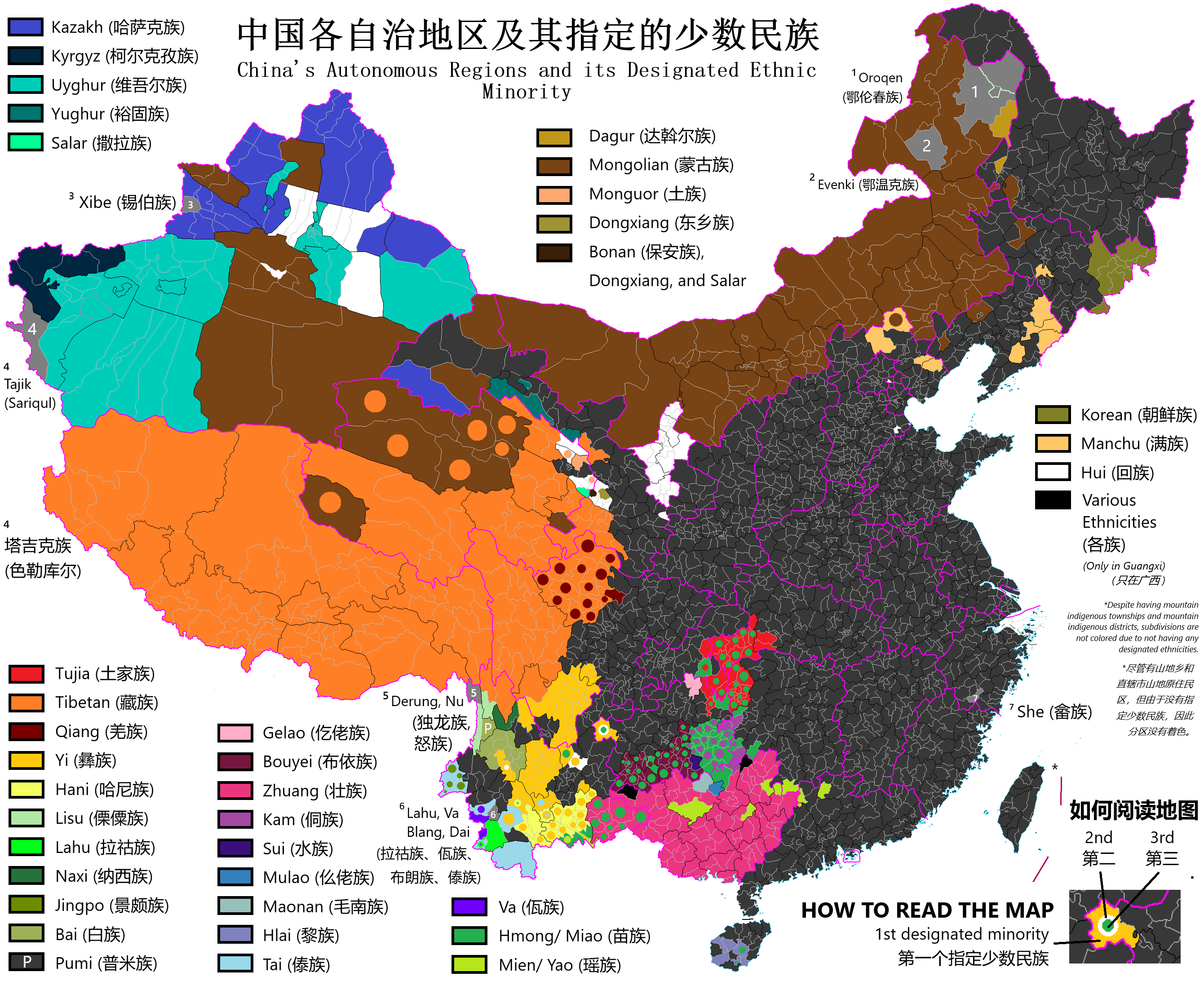
China's Autonomous Regions and its Designated Ethnic Minority

The PRC's autonomous administrative divisions may be found in the first (or top) to third levels of its national administrative divisions thus:

| Level | Type | Chinese | Pinyin | Number as of June 2005 |
|---|---|---|---|---|
| Province (1) | Autonomous regions | 自治区 | Zìzhìqū | 5 |
| Prefecture (2) | Autonomous prefectures | 自治州 | Zìzhìzhōu | 30 |
| County (3) | Autonomous counties | 自治县 | Zìzhìxiàn | 117 |
| County (3) | Autonomous banners | 自治旗 | Zìzhìqí | 3 |

== List of autonomous prefectures ==
| Province | Name | Simplified Chinese and Pinyin | Designated minority | Local name | Capital |
|---|---|---|---|---|---|
| Gansu | Linxia | 临夏回族自治州; Línxià Huízú Zìzhìzhōu | Hui | (The Hui speak Chinese) Xiao'erjing: لٍ‌ثِیَا خُوِزُو زِجِجِوْ | Linxia city |
| Gansu | Gannan | 甘南藏族自治州; Gānnán Zàngzú Zìzhìzhōu | Tibetan | Tibetan: ཀན་ལྷོ་བོད་རིགས་རང་སྐྱོང་ཁུལ་ (Kan-lho Bod-rigs rang-skyong-khul) | Hezuo (Hzö) city |
| Guizhou | Qiandongnan | 黔东南苗族侗族自治州; Qiándōngnán Miáozú Dòngzú Zìzhìzhōu | Miao and Dong | Hmu: Qeef Dongb Naif Dol Yat Hmub Zid Zid Zeb; Dong: Qeenc Dongs Nanc Nyenc Miiul Nyenc Gaeml Zil Zl Zous | Kaili (Kad Linx) city |
| Guizhou | Qiannan | 黔南布依族苗族自治州; Qiánnán Bùyīzú Miáozú Zìzhìzhōu | Bouyei and Miao | Bouyei: Qianfnanf Buxqyaix Buxyeeuz ziqziqzouy Hmu: Qeef Naif Dol Yat Dol Hmub Zid Zid Zeb | Duyun city |
| Guizhou | Qianxinan | 黔西南布依族苗族自治州; Qiánxī'nán Bùyīzú Miáozú Zìzhìzhōu | Bouyei and Miao | Bouyei: Qianfxiynanf Buxqyaix Buxyeeuz Ziqziqzouy; Hmu: Qeef Xib Naif Dol Yat Dol Hmub Zid Zid Zeb | Xingyi city |
| Hubei | Enshi | 恩施土家族苗族自治州; Ēnshī Tǔjiāzú Miáozú Zìzhìzhōu | Tujia and Miao | Tujia: Eng Shiv Bif Ziv Kar hev Bef Kar zouf xengv zuvз Hmong: Ee Si Thws Ca Txhwj Mioj Txhwj Txim Tsim Tsawb | Enshi city |
| Hunan | Xiangxi | 湘西土家族苗族自治州; Xiāngxī Tǔjiāzú Miáozú Zìzhìzhōu | Tujia and Miao | Tujia: Xiз’angv Xif Bif Ziv Kar hev Bef Kar zouf xengv zuvз Hmong: Xyaa Xyi Thws Ca Txhwj Mioj Txhwj Txim Tsim Tsawb | Jishou city |
| Jilin | Yanbian | 延边朝鲜族自治州; Yánbiān Cháoxiǎnzú Zìzhìzhōu | Korean | Korean: 연변 조선족 자치주 (Yeonbyeon Joseonjok Jachiju) | Yanji (Yeongil) city |
| Qinghai | Haibei | 海北藏族自治州; Hǎiběi Zàngzú Zìzhìzhōu | Tibetan | Tibetan: མཚོ་བྱང་བོད་རིགས་རང་སྐྱོང་ཁུལ་ (Mtsho-byang Bod-rigs rang-skyong-khul) | Haiyan County |
| Qinghai | Hainan | 海南藏族自治州; Hǎinán Zàngzú Zìzhìzhōu | Tibetan | Tibetan: མཚོ་ལྷོ་བོད་རིགས་རང་སྐྱོང་ཁུལ་ (Mtsho-lho Bod-rigs rang-skyong-khul) | Gonghe County |
| Qinghai | Huangnan | 黄南藏族自治州; Huángnán Zàngzú Zìzhìzhōu | Tibetan | Tibetan: རྨ་ལྷོ་བོད་རིགས་རང་སྐྱོང་ཁུལ་ (Rma-lho Bod-rigs rang skyong khul) | Tongren city |
| Qinghai | Golog | 果洛藏族自治州; Guǒluò Zàngzú Zìzhìzhōu | Tibetan | Tibetan: མགོ་ལོག་བོད་རིགས་རང་སྐྱོང་ཁུལ་ (Mgo-log Bod-rigs rang-skyong-khul) | Maqên County |
| Qinghai | Yushu | 玉树藏族自治州; Yùshù Zàngzú Zìzhìzhōu | Tibetan | Tibetan: ཡུལ་ཤུལ་བོད་རིགས་རང་སྐྱོང་ཁུལ་ (Yul-shul Bod-rigs rang-skyong-khul) | Yushu city |
| Qinghai | Haixi | 海西蒙古族藏族自治州; Hǎixī Měnggǔzú Zàngzú Zìzhìzhōu | Mongolian & Tibetan | Mongolian: ᠬᠠᠶᠢᠰᠢ ᠶᠢᠨ ᠮᠣᠩᠭᠣᠯ ᠲᠥᠪᠡᠳ ᠦᠨᠳᠦᠰᠦᠲᠡᠨ ᠦ ᠥᠪᠡᠷᠲᠡᠭᠡᠨ ᠵᠠᠰᠠᠬᠤ ᠵᠧᠦ (Borotal a-yin mongγol ebereen öbertegen zasaqu ǰuu); Tibetan: མཚོ་ནུབ་སོག་རིགས་ཆ་བོད་རིགས་རང་སྐྱོང་ཁུལ་ (Mtsho-nub Sog-rigs dang Bod-rigs rang-skyong-khul) | Delingha (Delhi) city |
| Sichuan | Ngawa | 阿坝藏族羌族自治州; Ābà Zàngzú Qiāngzú Zìzhìzhōu | Tibetan & Qiang | Tibetan: རྔ་བ་བོད་རིགས་ཆ་བ༹ང་རིགས་རང་སྐྱོང་ཁུལ་ (Rnga-ba Bod-rigs dang Chavang-rigs rang skyong khul); Qiangic: Ggabba Shbea Rrmea nyujugvez zhou | Barkam city |
| Sichuan | Garzê | 甘孜藏族自治州; Gānzī Zàngzú Zìzhìzhōu | Tibetan | Tibetan: དཀར་མཛེས་བོད་རིགས་རང་སྐྱོང་ཁུལ་ (Dkar-mdzes Bod-rigs rang-skyong khul) | Kangding (Dartsedo) city |
| Sichuan | Liangshan | 凉山彝族自治州; Liángshān Yízú Zìzhìzhōu | Yi | Yi: ꆃꎭꆈꌠꊨꏦꏱꅉꍏ (Niepsha Nuosu Zytjiejux dde Zho) | Xichang (Op Rro) city |
| Xinjiang | Kizilsu | 克孜勒苏柯尔克孜自治州; Kèzīlèsū Kē'ěrkèzī Zìzhìzhōu | Kyrgyz | Kyrgyz: قىزىلسۇۇ قىرعىز اپتونوم وبلاسى (Kızılsuu Kırgız avtonom oblastı) | Artux city |
| Xinjiang | Bortala | 博尔塔拉蒙古自治州; Bó'ěrtǎlā Měnggǔ Zìzhìzhōu | Mongolian | Mongolian: ᠪᠣᠷᠣᠳᠠᠯ᠎ᠠ ᠮᠣᠩᠭᠣᠯ ᠥᠪᠡᠷᠲᠡᠭᠡᠨ ᠵᠠᠰᠠᠬᠤ ᠵᠧᠦ (Borotala mongγol ebereen zasaqu ǰuu) | Bole (Bortala) city |
| Xinjiang | Changji | 昌吉回族自治州; Chāngjí Huízú Zìzhìzhōu | Hui | (The Hui speak Chinese) Xiao'erjing: چَانْ‌ݣِ خُوِزُو زِجِجِوْ | Changji city |
| Xinjiang | Bayingolin | 巴音郭楞蒙古自治州; Bāyīnguōlèng Měnggǔ Zìzhìzhōu | Mongolian | Mongolian: ᠪᠠᠶᠠᠨᠭᠣᠣᠯ ᠮᠣᠩᠭᠣᠯ ᠥᠪᠡᠷᠲᠡᠭᠡᠨ ᠵᠠᠰᠠᠬᠤ ᠵᠧᠦ (Bayangol mongγol ebereen zasaqu ǰuu) | Korla city |
| Xinjiang | Ili (Altay) (Tacheng) | 伊犁哈萨克自治州; Yīlí Hāsàkè Zìzhìzhōu (阿勒泰地区) (Ālètài Dìqū) (塔城地区) (Tǎchéng Dìqū) | Kazakh | Kazakh: ىله قازاق اۆتونومىيالى وبلىسى (İle Qazaq awtonomïyalıq oblısı) (Kazakh: ئالتاي ۋىلايىتى) (Altay aymağı) (Kazakh: تارباعاتاي ايماعى) (Tarbağatay aymağı) | Yining (Ghulja) city (Altay city) (Tacheng city) |
| Yunnan | Dehong | 德宏傣族景颇族自治州; Déhóng Dǎizú Jǐngpōzú Zìzhìzhōu | Dai and Jingpo | Tai Nüa - ᥟᥪᥒᥱ ᥙᥪᥴ ᥓᥝᥲ ᥙᥩᥒ ᥛᥥᥝᥰ ᥖᥭᥰ ᥓᥤᥒ ᥚᥨᥲ ᥖᥬᥲ ᥑᥨᥒᥰ (Sakhkung Sam Jinghpo Amyu Madu Uphkang Mungdo); Zaiwa:Sikung Sam Zaizo Byumyu Yumsing Upkang Mau | Mangshi city |
| Yunnan | Nujiang | 怒江傈僳族自治州; Nùjiāng Lìsùzú Zìzhìzhōu | Lisu | Lisu: ꓠꓳ-ꓟꓵ ꓡꓲ-ꓢꓴ ꓫꓵꓽ ꓚꓲꓸ ꓛꓬꓽ ꓗꓪꓼ ꓫꓵꓽ ꓝꓳꓴ (Nolmut lisu shit jilqait guatshit zhou) | Lushui city |
| Yunnan | Dêqên (Diqing) | 迪庆藏族自治州; Díqìng Zàngzú Zìzhìzhōu | Tibetan | Tibetan: བདེ་ཆེན་བོད་རིགས་རང་སྐྱོང་ཁུལ་ (Bde-chen Bod-rigs rang-skyong khul) | Shangri-La city |
| Yunnan | Dali | 大理白族自治州; Dàlǐ Báizú Zìzhìzhōu | Bai | Bai: Darl•lit Baif•cuf zirl•zirl•zox | Dali city |
| Yunnan | Chuxiong | 楚雄彝族自治州; Chǔxióng Yízú Zìzhìzhōu | Yi | Yi: ꀒꇐꆈꌠꊨꏦꏱꅉꍏ (Olu Nuosu Zytjiejux dde Zho) | Chuxiong city |
| Yunnan | Honghe | 红河哈尼族彝族自治州; Hónghé Hānízú Yízú Zìzhìzhōu | Hani and Yi | Hani: Haoqhoq Haqniqssaq Haqhholssaq Ziiqziifzel; Yi: ꉼꉻꆈꌠꊨꏦꏱꅉꍏ (Hopho Nuosu Zytjiejux dde Zho) | Mengzi city |
| Yunnan | Wenshan | 文山壮族苗族自治州; Wenshān Zhuàngzú Miáozú Zìzhìzhōu | Zhuang and Miao | Zhuang: Munzsanh Bouxcuengh Myauzcuz Swcicouh; Hmong: Veej Sa Tsuaam Txhwj Mioj Txhwj Txim Tsim Tsawb | Wenshan city |
| Yunnan | Xishuangbanna (Sibsongbanna) | 西双版纳傣族自治州; Xīshuāngbǎnnà Dǎizú Zìzhìzhōu | Dai | Tai Lü: ᦈᦹᧈ ᦈᦹᧈ ᦵᦋᦲᧁᧈ ᦘᦱ ᦉᦱ ᦺᦑ ᧑᧒ ᦗᧃ ᦓᦱ | Jinghong city |

== Ethnic composition of autonomous prefectures ==
Note: * - denotes as the second titular ethnic group

| Autonomous prefecture | Year established | Province | Titular ethnic group | | | Other minorities | | | Han % | | Total population |
| Autonomous prefecture | Year established | Province | | % 2000 | % 2010 | | % 2000 | % 2010 | 2000 | 2010 | |
|---|---|---|---|---|---|---|---|---|---|---|---|
| Bayingolin Prefecture | 1954 | Xinjiang | Mongolian | 3.40 | 3.40 | Uyghur | 31.83 | 31.83 | 59.29 | 59.29 | 1,323,028 |
| Bortala Prefecture | 1954 | Xinjiang | Mongolian | 5.64 | 5.66 | Uyghur | 12.53 | 13.32 | 67.19 | 64.96 | 482,615 |
| Changji Prefecture | 1954 | Xinjiang | Hui | 11.55 | 9.52 | Kazakh | 7.98 | 9.33 | 75.14 | 75.31 | 1,412,844 |
| Chuxiong Prefecture | 1958 | Yunnan | Yi | 26.31 | 26.70 | Lisu | 2.03 | 1.98 | 67.45 | 66.94 | 2,615,109 |
| Dali Prefecture | 1956 | Yunnan | Bai | 32.80 | 32.19 | Yi | 12.94 | 13.02 | 50.35 | 50.69 | 3,525,706 |
| Dehong Prefecture | 1953 | Yunnan | Dai | 30.14 | 28.88 | Jingpo* | 11.53 | 11.09 | 50.66 | 51.93 | 1,124,432 |
| Dêqên (Diqing) Prefecture | 1957 | Yunnan | Tibetan | 33.12 | 32.36 | Lisu | 27.78 | 26.72 | 16.39 | 18.34 | 357,528 |
| Enshi Prefecture | 1983 | Hubei | Tujia | 45.00 | 47.50 | Miao* | 5.45 | 5.01 | 47.24 | 45.32 | 3,976,081 |
| Gannan Prefecture | 1953 | Gansu | Tibetan | 51.44 | 54.64 | Hui | 6.43 | 6.25 | 41.75 | 38.70 | 723,521 |
| Garzê Prefecture | 1950 | Sichuan | Tibetan | 78.37 | 78.29 | Yi | 2.56 | 2.66 | 18.24 | 18.24 | 1,060,632 |
| Golog Prefecture | 1954 | Qinghai | Tibetan | 91.63 | 91.86 | Hui | 1.11 | 0.96 | 6.59 | 6.57 | 173,541 |
| Haibei Prefecture | 1953 | Qinghai | Tibetan | 24.15 | 24.36 | Hui | 30.58 | 31.52 | 36.63 | 35.88 | 283,230 |
| Hainan Prefecture | 1953 | Qinghai | Tibetan | 62.77 | 66.31 | Hui | 6.97 | 6.84 | 28.06 | 24.84 | 446,849 |
| Haixi Prefecture | 1954 | Qinghai | Mongol | 7.23 | 5.53 | Tibetan* | 12.16 | 10.93 | 64.95 | 66.01 | 390,743 |
| Honghe Prefecture | 1957 | Yunnan | Hani | 16.60 | 17.55 | Yi* | 23.57 | 23.19 | 44.31 | 42.85 | 4,408,699 |
| Huangnan Prefecture | 1953 | Qinghai | Tibetan | 66.32 | 68.55 | Mongol | 13.54 | 13.98 | 7.54 | 6.08 | 254,033 |
| Ili Prefecture | 1954 | Xinjiang | Kazakh | | 21.53 | Uyghur | | 26.88 | | 35.22 | 2,814,980 |
| Kizilsu Prefecture | 1954 | Xinjiang | Kyrgyz | 28.32 | 27.32 | Uyghur | 63.98 | 64.68 | 6.41 | 6.78 | 539,849 |
| Liangshan Prefecture | 1952 | Sichuan | Yi | 44.43 | 49.13 | Tibetan | 1.49 | 1.39 | 51.97 | 47.55 | 4,789,421 |
| Linxia Prefecture | 1956 | Gansu | Hui | | 31.59 | Dongxiang | | 25.99 | | 39.70 | 2,103,259 |
| Ngawa Prefecture | 1953 | Sichuan | Tibetan | 53.72 | 54.50 | Qiang* | 18.28 | 17.58 | 24.69 | 24.56 | 898,846 |
| Nujiang Prefecture | 1954 | Yunnan | Lisu | 47.13 | 48.21 | Bai | 26.97 | 26.04 | 13.13 | 12.35 | 520,765 |
| Qiandongnan Prefecture | 1956 | Guizhou | Miao | 41.48 | 41.57 | Dong* | 31.40 | 29.02 | 19.3 | 21.73 | 4,535,015 |
| Qiannan Prefecture | 1956 | Guizhou | Buyei | 32.46 | 31.22 | Miao* | 13.37 | 12.69 | 43.37 | 44.84 | 4,037,887 |
| Qianxinan Prefecture | 1982 | Guizhou | Buyei | 30.04 | 27.56 | Miao* | 7.51 | 7.08 | 57.53 | 60.62 | 3,398,147 |
| Wenshan Prefecture | 1958 | Yunnan | Miao | 12.94 | 13.68 | Zhuang* | 30.04 | 29.20 | 41.99 | 42.69 | 3,703,008 |
| Xiangxi Prefecture | 1957 | Hunan | Tujia | | 42.73 | Miao* | | 33.85 | | 22.85 | 2,547,833 |
| Xishuangbanna (Sibsongbanna) Prefecture | 1953 | Yunnan | Dai | 29.89 | 27.89 | Hani | 18.73 | 19.01 | 29.11 | 30.03 | 942,844 |
| Yanbian Prefecture | 1952 | Jilin | Korean | 36.26 | 32.45 | Manchu | 2.58 | 2.52 | 60.70 | 64.55 | 2,190,763 |
| Yushu Prefecture | 1951 | Qinghai | Tibetan | | 96.49 | Hui | | 0.22 | | 3.09 | 373,427 |

== Former autonomous prefectures of China ==
- Hainan Li and Miao Autonomous Prefecture (1952–1988) in Guangdong, abolished because of the establishment of Hainan Province.
- Hedong Hui Autonomous Prefecture (1954–1955) in Gansu, later changed name as Wuzhong Hui Autonomous Prefecture (1955–1958), abolished because of the establishment of Ningxia Hui Autonomous Region.
- Xihaigu Hui Autonomous Prefecture (1953–1955) in Gansu, later changed name as Guyuan Hui Autonomous Prefecture (1955–1958), abolished because of the establishment of Ningxia Hui Autonomous Region.
- Guixi Zhuang Autonomous Prefecture (sub-provincial level, 1953–1955) in Guangxi Province, abolished because of the establishment of Guangxi Zhuang Autonomous Region.
- Bayinhot Mongol Autonomous Prefecture (1954–1956) in Gansu, included today's Dengkou County and Alxa League. The autonomy abolished after it merged into Inner Mongolia Autonomous Region.

== Administrative prefecture level units with a population of 30% or more of ethnic minorities ==
Excluding prefecture level units of autonomous regions in 2000.

- Hebei: Chengde (Han - 55.32%, Manchu - 39.87%)
- Liaoning: Benxi (Han - 66.84%, Manchu - 30.22%), Dandong (Han - 64.11%, Manchu - 32.99%)
- Hunan: Zhangjiajie (Tujia - 68.40%, Han - 22.81%), Huaihua (Han - 61.33%, Dong - 17.42%, Miao - 15.63%)
- Guizhou: Anshun (Han - 61.6%, Buyei - 16.92%, Miao - 14.27%), Tongren (Tujia - 37.81%, Han - 31.76%, Miao - 14.87%, Dong - 11.41%)
- Yunnan: Yuxi (Han - 68,18%, Yi - 19,32%), Pu'er (Han - 40,92%, Hani - 16,98%, Yi - 16.58%, Lahu - 11.47%), Lijiang (Han - 42.71%, Nakhi 20.51%, Yi - 18.68%, Lisu - 9.62%), Lincang (Han - 61.22%, Dai - 15.77%, Lahu and Va - 9.76%)
- Qinghai: Haidong (Han - 56.33%, Hui - 20.38%, Tibetan - 9.2%, Tu - 8.06%)

== See also ==
- List of prefecture-level divisions of China
- Tusi Native Chieftain System
- Autonomous regions of China
