= Chenguanying station =

Railway station in Lanzhou, China

Chenguanying 陈官营站
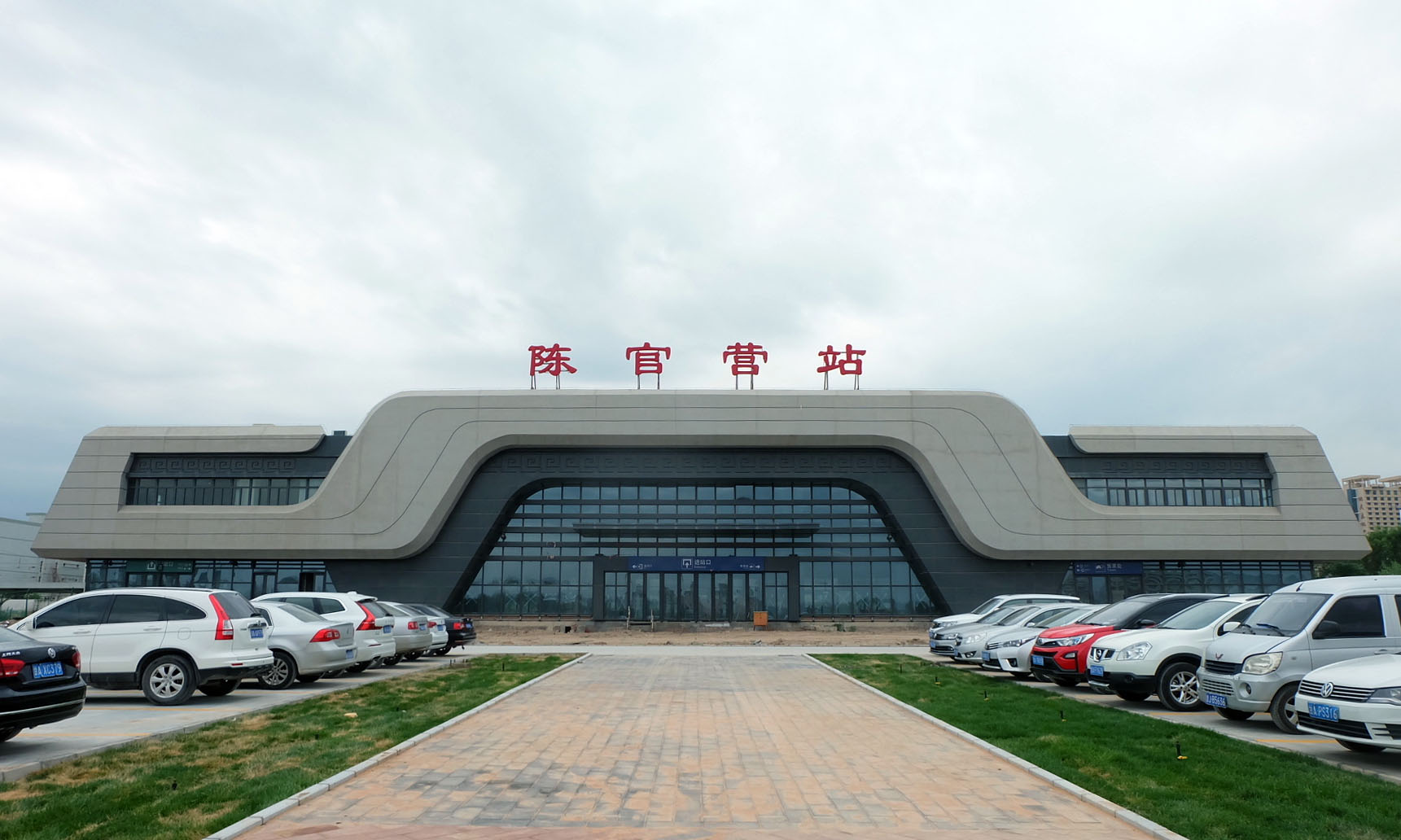

General information
- Location: Xigu West Road; Xigu District, Lanzhou, Gansu; China
- Coordinates: 36.08660°N 103.65966°E
- Operated by: CR Lanzhou; Lanzhou Rail Transit
- Line(s): Lanzhou–Qinghai railway; Lanzhou–Xinjiang railway; Lanzhou-Zhongchuan Airport Intercity Railway; 1 Line 1 (Lanzhou Metro)

Other information
- Classification: Third class

Chenguanying station (Chinese: 陈官营站) is a station in Xigu District, Lanzhou, Gansu. Built in 1953, it is a minor station on the Lanzhou–Xinjiang railway, with only one local train per day stopping in each direction. A new station building was constructed together with the construction of the Lanzhou-Zhongchuan Airport Intercity Railway, however the station has not opened as a stop on this route yet.

== Metro station ==
Chenguanying station is also the western terminus of the Lanzhou Metro Line 1. The metro station is located in a separate building a hundred meters east of the railway station.

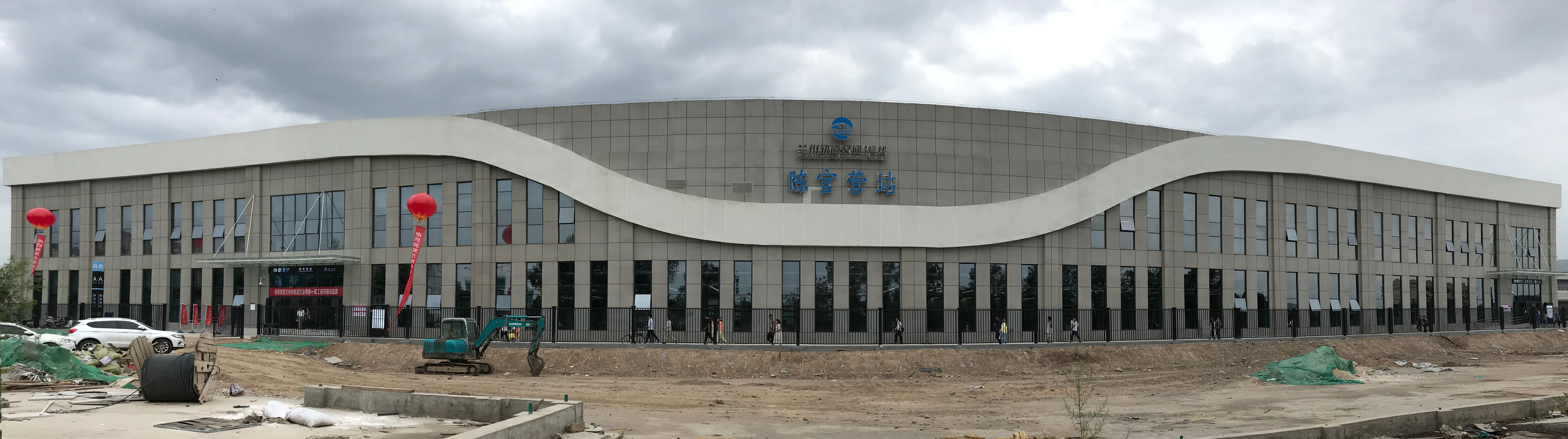
Chenguanying Metro station
