= Qinwangchuan railway station =

Railway station in Lanzhou, China

Qinwangchuan railway station 秦王川站

General information
- Coordinates: 36.47°N 103.76°E
- Operated by: China Railway Lanzhou Group
- Line: Yinchuan–Lanzhou high-speed railway
- Platforms: 3
- Tracks: 8
- Bus routes: 2
- Connections: Bus

History
- Opened: 29 December 2022
Location

Qinwangchuan railway station is a station on the Yinchuan–Lanzhou high-speed railway serving Lanzhou New Area, in addition to the Lanzhou Xinqu railway station on the Lanzhou–Zhongchuan Airport intercity railway. Qinwangchuan is the name of the plain where Lanzhou New Area is located.

The station building is designed to visualize the 'rushing Yellow River' with a ceiling inspired by Dunhuang style caisson.
