= Lanzhou Xinqu railway station =

Railway station in Lanzhou, China

Lanzhou Xinqu railway station 兰州新区站
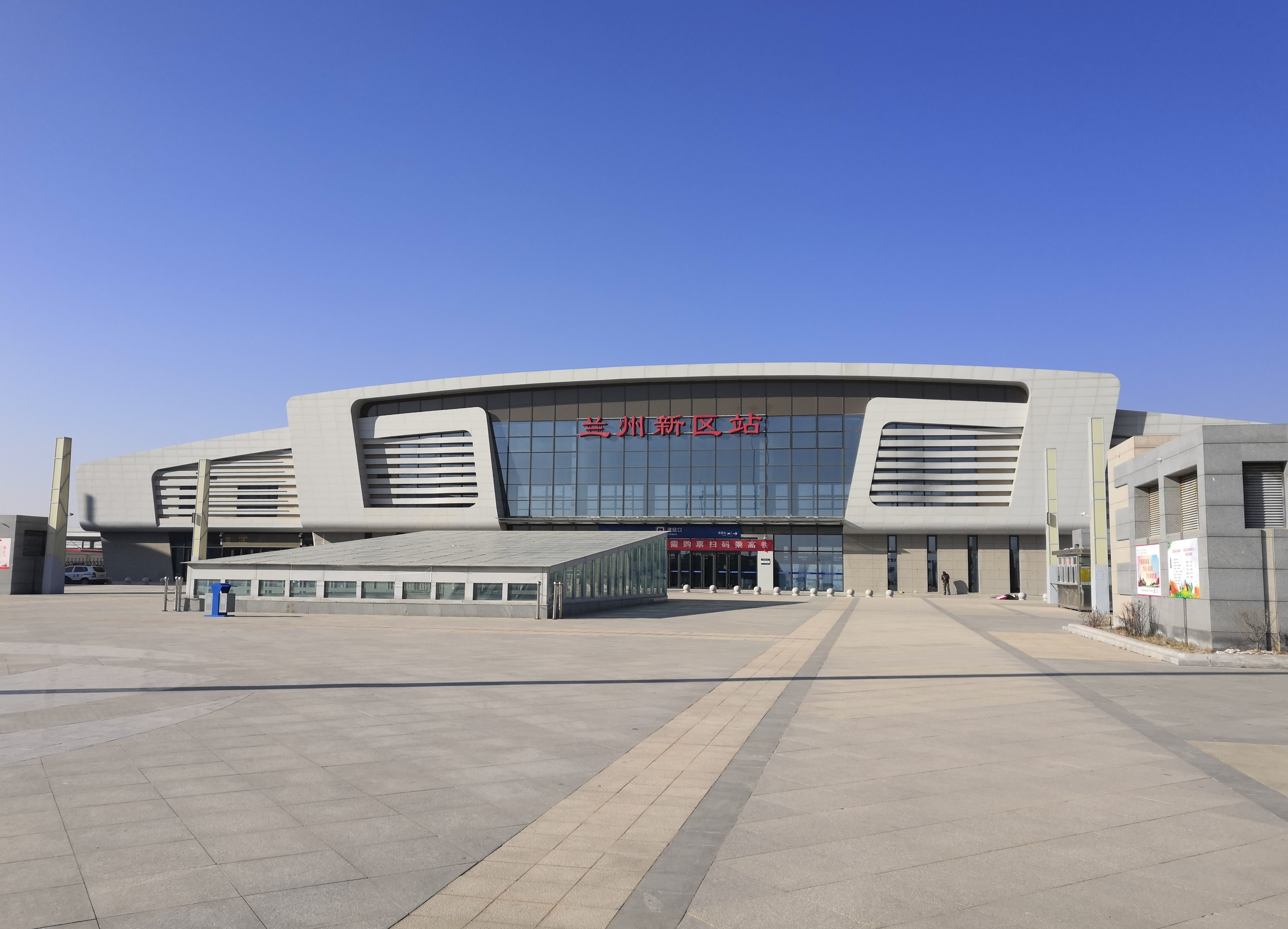

General information
- Other names: Lanzhou New Area railway station
- Location: Yongdeng, Lanzhou, Gansu; China
- Coordinates: 36.46957°N 103.616338°E
- Operator: China Railway Lanzhou Group, China Railway Corporation
- Line: Lanzhou–Zhongchuan Airport Intercity Railway
- Platforms: 1

History
- Opened: 30 September 2015
Location

Lanzhou Xinqu railway station (Chinese: 兰州新区站; pinyin: Lánzhōu Xīnqū zhàn; lit. 'Lanzhou New Area railway station') is a railway station located in Lanzhou New Area, Yongdeng County in Lanzhou, on the Lanzhou–Zhongchuan Airport Intercity Railway.

It takes about 30 minutes to the Lanzhou West railway station as well as the city proper, although the station is close to the commercial centre of the Qilihe District. The station was opened on 30 September 2015, along with the railway.

== See also ==
- Qinwangchuan railway station, serving Lanzhou New Area on the Yinchuan–Lanzhou high-speed railway
