= Fuliqu railway station =

Railway station in Lanzhou, China

Fuliqu 福利区站
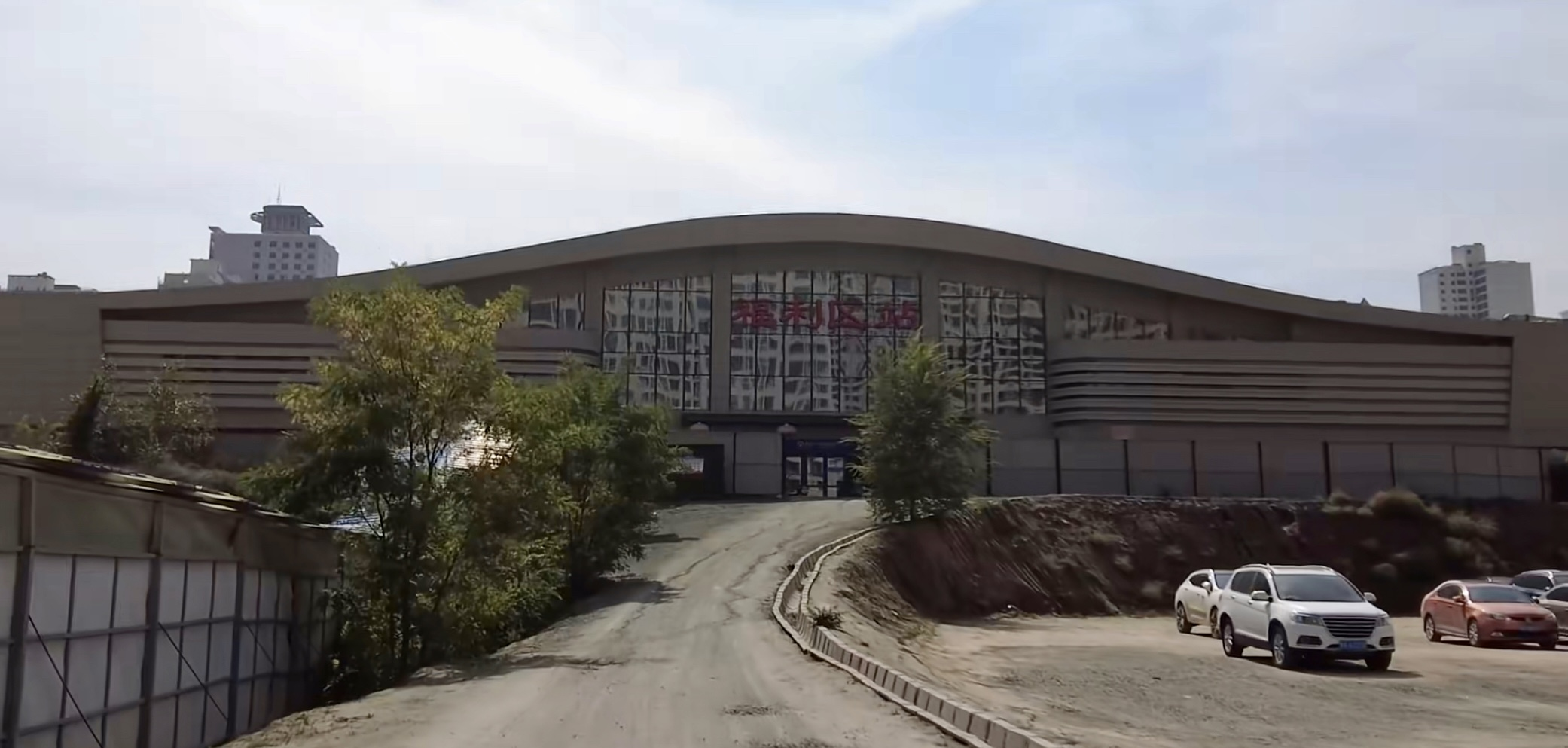

General information
- Location: Xigu District, Lanzhou, Gansu; China
- Coordinates: 36.09546°N 103.62875°E
- Operated by: CR Lanzhou
- Lines: Lanzhou–Qinghai railway; Lanzhou–Xinjiang railway; Lanzhou-Zhongchuan Airport Intercity Railway

History
- Opened: January 8, 2020
Location

Fuliqu railway station is a station on the Lanzhou–Zhongchuan Airport intercity railway. When the railway went into operation, only the concrete core and the platforms of the station were built. The station opened on January 8, 2020 as a commuter station served by 12 trains a day.
