= Beijing–Lanzhou corridor =

High-speed rail corridor in China

Beijing-Lanzhou corridor 京兰通道
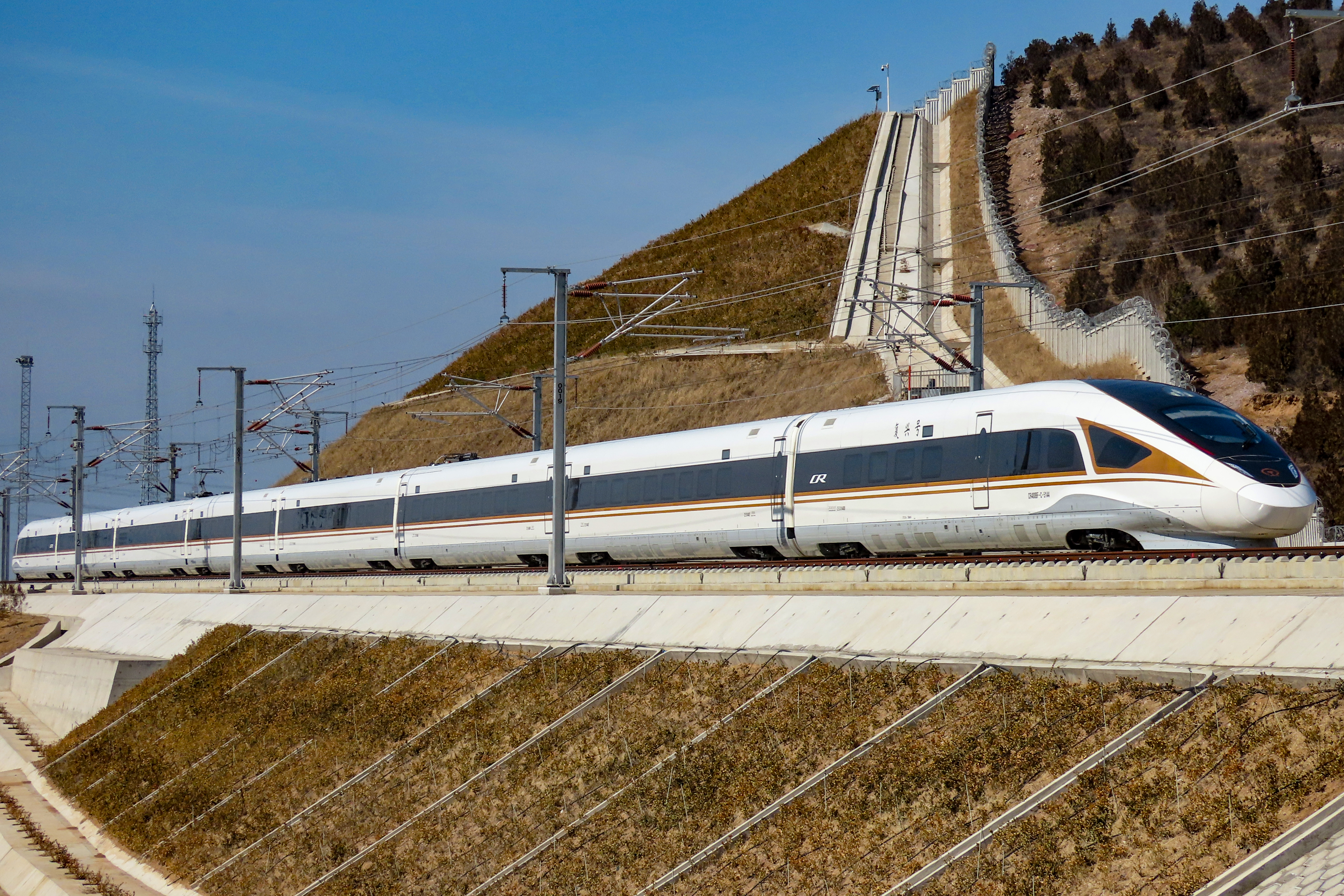
- A CR400BF-C train on the Beijing-Zhangjiakou section of Beijing–Lanzhou corridor

Overview
- Status: Operational
- Locale: People's Republic of China
- Termini: Beijing; Lanzhou

Service
- Type: High-speed rail
- Operator(s): China Railway High-speed

Technical
- Track gauge: 1,435 mm (4 ft 8 1/2 in) standard gauge
- Electrification: 50 Hz 25,000 V
- Operating speed: 200 to 350 km/h (124 to 217 mph)

The Beijing–Lanzhou corridor is a high-speed rail corridor running from Beijing through Hohhot and Yinchuan to Lanzhou. It was announced in 2016 as part of China's "Eight Vertical and Eight Horizontal" network.

== Sections ==
Line	Project name	Section	Design speed (km/h)	Length (km)	Construction start date	Opening date
Beijing-Baotou HSR	Beijing–Zhangjiakou ICR	Beijing North–Zhangjiakou	250–350	172	29 April 2016	30 December 2019
Beijing-Baotou HSR	Zhangjiakou–Hohhot HSR	Zhangjiakou–Ulanqab	250	161	28 April 2014	30 December 2019
Beijing-Baotou HSR	Zhangjiakou–Hohhot HSR	Ulanqab–Hohhot East	250	126	28 April 2014	3 August 2017
Beijing-Baotou HSR	Jining–Baotou railway	Hohhot East–Hohhot	160	9	1 April 2015	4 August 2017
Beijing-Baotou HSR	Jining–Baotou railway	Hohhot–Taigemu	160	19	5 March 2014	28 September 2015
Beijing-Baotou HSR	Jining–Baotou railway	Taigemu–Baotou	200	146	1 April 2009	3 December 2012
Baotou–Yinchuan high-speed railway	Baotou–Yinchuan high-speed railway	Baotou–Huinong South	250	422	31 December 2021	23 December 2025
Baotou–Yinchuan high-speed railway	Baotou–Yinchuan high-speed railway	Huinong South–Yinchuan	250	97	16 August 2018	1 October 2024
Yinchuan–Lanzhou HSR	Yinchuan–Lanzhou HSR	Yinchuan–Wuzhong	250	74	26 October 2015	29 December 2019
Yinchuan–Lanzhou HSR	Wuzhong–Zhongwei ICR	Wuzhong–Zhongwei South	250	133	10 October 2015	29 December 2019
Yinchuan–Lanzhou HSR	Zhongwei–Lanzhou HSR	Zhongwei South–Shuping	250	222	19 June 2017	29 December 2022
Lanzhou–Zhongchuan Airport ICR	Lanzhou–Zhongchuan ICR	Shuping-Fuliqu	160	34	21 December 2012	30 September 2015
Lanzhou–Zhongchuan Airport ICR	Connection of Lanzhou–Zhongchuan ICR to central Lanzhou	Fuliqu–Lanzhou West	120	11	1 September 2018	6 September 2024

== See also ==
- High-speed rail in China
- Baotou–Yinchuan high-speed railway
