= Lanzhou New Area =

Lanzhou New Area 兰州新区
- State-level new area
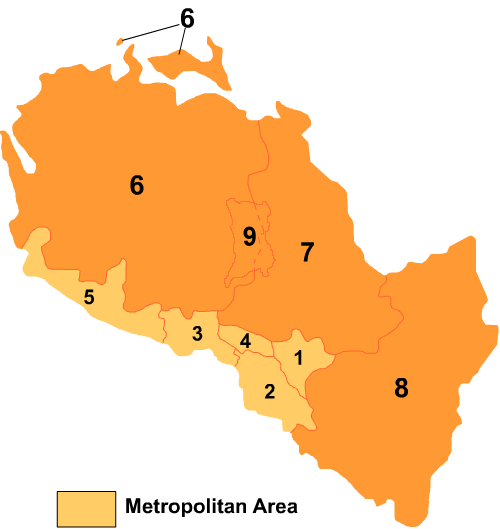
- Lanzhou New area is labelled 9 on the map.

- Location within Gansu
- Coordinates: 36°29.89′N 103°39.73′E
- Country: People's Republic of China
- Province: Gansu
- Prefecture-level city: Lanzhou
- Established: 20 August 2012

Area
  - Total: 1,744 km^{2} (673 sq mi)

Population (2020)
  - Total: 450,000
- Time zone: UTC+8 (China Standard)
- Postal code: 730300
- Website: www.lzxq.gov.cn

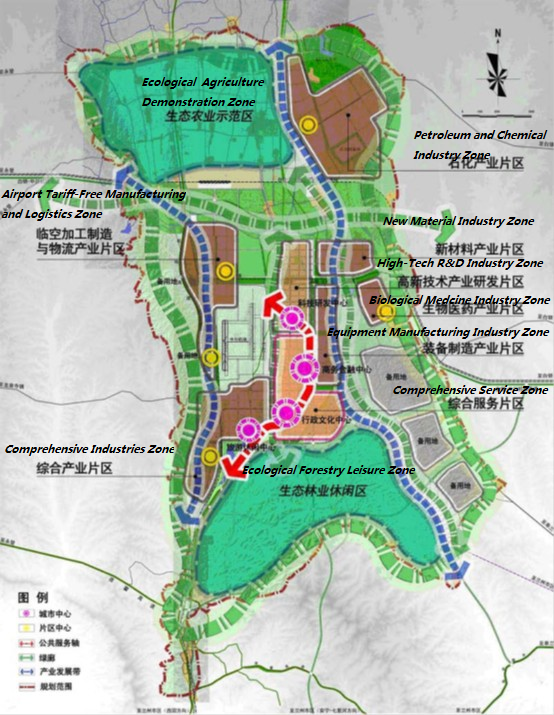
Planning map of Lanzhou New Area

Lanzhou New Area (simplified Chinese: 兰州新区; traditional Chinese: 蘭州新區; pinyin: Lánzhōuxīnqū) is a state-level new area. It was established in 2012 as the fifth state-level new area and the first in Western China. It is located on the Qingwangchuan plain, around 70 km (45 mi) north of downtown Lanzhou, which is also where Lanzhou Zhongchuan International Airport is located.

== Background ==
The establishment of Lanzhou New Area (LNA) is the culmination of multiple strategies both from Chinese Central Government and Gansu Provincial Government. Since China launched its Western Development initiative in 2000, several 'Western' Provinces, such as Shanxi, Guangxi, etc. have seen a flurry of investments during the last decade due to the favorable policies those provinces received from China's Central Government. With huge amount of capital investment issued from State's Financial Department, those provinces developed rapidly with a progressive GDP growth rate, a gradually mature industry structure and an efficient communication system. Though the provinces mentioned above developed quickly, none of those fast developing provinces are actually located in the geographical West of China, although the Chinese Central Government classified them into the 12 Western provinces.

Lanzhou is intended to achieve the ideal of 'common wealth' as outlined by the Chinese Communist Party through the rapid development of Western provinces. The geographical location of Lanzhou New Area holds significant advantages to its future economic growth. Lanzhou, 30 kilometres south from the New Area, is the biggest city among two megacities (Ürümqi and Xi'an) in this vast region, and is relatively close to two other capital cities, (Xining of Qinghai Province and Yinchuan of Ningxia Hui Autonomous Region). These three capital cities are close enough to form a regional economic conglomeration, and Lanzhou New Area is envisioned as the center of this amalgamation. The development of LNA will boost the development of its adjacent areas.

Lanzhou's main urban area is constrained in size by its geographical topography, since it is a typical valley sandwiched by mountains, with the Yellow River crossing by. The topography of Lanzhou hampers this city to become a continuous megacity like Beijing or Xi'an. The General Office of the State Council issued the Several Advice about Supporting the Development of Economy and Society of Gansu Province in May 2010, especially stating that Lanzhou has to be the impetus of the development of Gansu Province, and even the whole northwestern region. Not long after, on August 3, 2010, the Lanzhou Municipal Government, by the 7th Session of the 11th convention of Lanzhou Municipal Council, announced the strategy of building a new city in Qinwangchuan plain, which now called Lanzhou New Area. Later, the Gansu Provincial Government issued the Consulting Advice about Promoting Constructions in Lanzhou New Area in order to support the development of LNA.

Lanzhou and Gansu province are part of China's strategic platform for opening up to the West, to improve manufacturing industry and economy in the western regions. Within western China, Lanzhou's role as a center of development should be strengthened by Lanzhou New Area.

== Administrative divisions ==
In 2019, Lanzhou New Area was formally established as a county-level division of Lanzhou, and given government over three towns that were split off from Yongdeng and Gaolan counties:

- Zhongchuan (中川镇)
- Qinchuan (秦川镇)
- Xicha (西岔镇)

== History and geography ==
Lanzhou New Area is located in the Qinwangchuan plain, the largest plateau basin near Lanzhou, measuring roughly 40 km from north to south and 16 km from east to west. The area of the plain is 470 km^{2} (180 mi^{2}) and it is elevated between 1800 and 2300 meters. The plain was formed 70 million years ago with the formation of the Himalaya.

Around 200 BC, the plain was still humid, but during the Han dynasty the plain became very arid. Thanks to irrigation and new farming methods, it became a fertile agricultural area again.

Until Lanzhou's new Zhongchuan Airport was built in the 1960s, the area remained of little importance. In the 1970s and 1980s, a water diversion project leading water from the Datong River improved the availability of irrigation water in the plain.

On June 22, 2011, the first press conference was held by the Administration Council of Lanzhou New Area (ACLNA). The ACLNA issued the General Planning of Lanzhou New Area (2011-2030), confirming the objectives of LNA: Strong Industrial City, Ecological Green City, Multiple Lakes City, Modern New City. The ACLNA aims to achieve a GDP of 50 billion RMB, 100 billion RMB and 270 billion RMB by years 2015, 2020 and 2030 respectively in LNA. The objective rendered the economic and geographical scale of LNA to be equivalent to that of Lanzhou main city within 20 years. On August 20, 2012 Lanzhou New Area was approved by the State Council of China's Central Government as the fifth state-level new area. In order to construct the city, 6000 workers and more than 3000 excavators were brought in to flatten hundreds of mountain tops, thereby making land which could be built upon.

=== Population ===
The area was formerly described as a ghost town, and still houses far from the eventually envisioned population of one million. In 2017, city officials claimed that LNA has 150,000 residents plus 40,000 construction workers, though a journalist from The Guardian who visited the site suspected that these numbers were "wildly inflated" and asserted that large parts of the city remained vacant. Most other early residents were local villagers who were received an urban hukou in exchange for selling their land, and workers of factories that had been relocated to the new area.

By 2018 the population had reached 250,000 people, which still made the area one of the least densely populated New Areas in China. Originally it was planned for the area to have 600,000 inhabitants by 2020. The actual population by November 2020 was 465,000.

=== Zones ===
There are four functional zones: the 246-square-kilometer central development zone environs Zhongchuan International Airport (without airport controlled area) which includes industrial congregation zone, comprehensive service zone and airport tariff-free manufacturing and logistics zone; the 48-square-kilometer ecological leisure and business housing zone; 248-square-kilometer demonstration zone for developing barren wasteland and hills; 220-square-kilometer ecological demonstration zone of modern agriculture.

=== Smart city ===
LNA has been designated a smart city since 2017, primarily based on technology supplied by Huawei. Fire fighting, water management, healthcare and municipal administration are managed using 'smart' technology.

== Transportation ==
Communication systems are the core of the development of Lanzhou New Area, owing to the differences with other Chinese new areas which are generally located close to the existing urban areas. The common model of Chinese new areas can be exemplified as a giant plain area which needs to be expanded. It is a spontaneous urbanization of the old main city area, and short distances between the new areas and their respective main cities are advantageous for the new areas' development. Lanzhou's peculiar topography led to Lanzhou New Area being located 70 kilometers away from its main city, and the linkage between the new and the old area is a crucial factor for its development.

=== Railways ===
The Lanzhou–Zhongchuan Airport Intercity Railway has an intermediate station for Lanzhou New Area. The Zhongwei–Lanzhou high-speed railway passes along the south part of the New Area, with Qinwangchuan railway station serving the area.

Construction of the Lanzhou Metro commenced in July 2012, and future lines are planned connecting the New Area to the old city. Lanzhou Zhongchuan Airport is being extended to become a giant air hub in the Western region, making it a potential center for international flight and logistics, especially towards Central and Western Asia.

A freight railway connects a freight terminal in the north to the Lanxin Railway.

=== Tram ===
The construction of several tram lines has been approved by the government. This would be the first tram line in Northwest China. Once finished, the system is planned to have 5 lines. The first two lines were to be finished in 2019. However, as of February 2020, development appears to be put on hold in planning phase, as Tianshui Tram becomes the first tram line to open in Gansu.

=== Highways ===
- S1 Lanzhou-Yingpanguan / Lanying Expressway
- G1816 Wuhai–Maqên Expressway
- Lanqin Expressway

== Climate ==
Climate data for Lanzhou New Area (Lanzhou Zhongchuan International Airport), elevation 1,947 m (6,388 ft), (2012–2024 normals)
Month	Jan	Feb	Mar	Apr	May	Jun	Jul	Aug	Sep	Oct	Nov	Dec	Year
Mean daily maximum °C (°F)	0.2 (32.4)	3.3 (37.9)	11.5 (52.7)	16.2 (61.2)	20.8 (69.4)	24.7 (76.5)	26.8 (80.2)	25.2 (77.4)	20.2 (68.4)	14.1 (57.4)	7.1 (44.8)	0.7 (33.3)	14.2 (57.6)
Daily mean °C (°F)	−7.4 (18.7)	−3.8 (25.2)	4.3 (39.7)	9.3 (48.7)	14.1 (57.4)	18.3 (64.9)	20.5 (68.9)	19.5 (67.1)	14.7 (58.5)	8.2 (46.8)	0.7 (33.3)	−6.5 (20.3)	7.7 (45.8)
Mean daily minimum °C (°F)	−14.9 (5.2)	−10.8 (12.6)	−3.0 (26.6)	2.4 (36.3)	7.3 (45.1)	12.0 (53.6)	14.2 (57.6)	13.7 (56.7)	9.1 (48.4)	2.3 (36.1)	−5.8 (21.6)	−13.6 (7.5)	1.1 (33.9)
Average relative humidity (%)	52	51.1	40.0	44.6	47.3	52.4	60.5	63.9	68.4	64.2	59.7	57.5	55.1
Source: IEM
