= Zhongchuan, Lanzhou =

Zhongchuan 中川镇
- Town
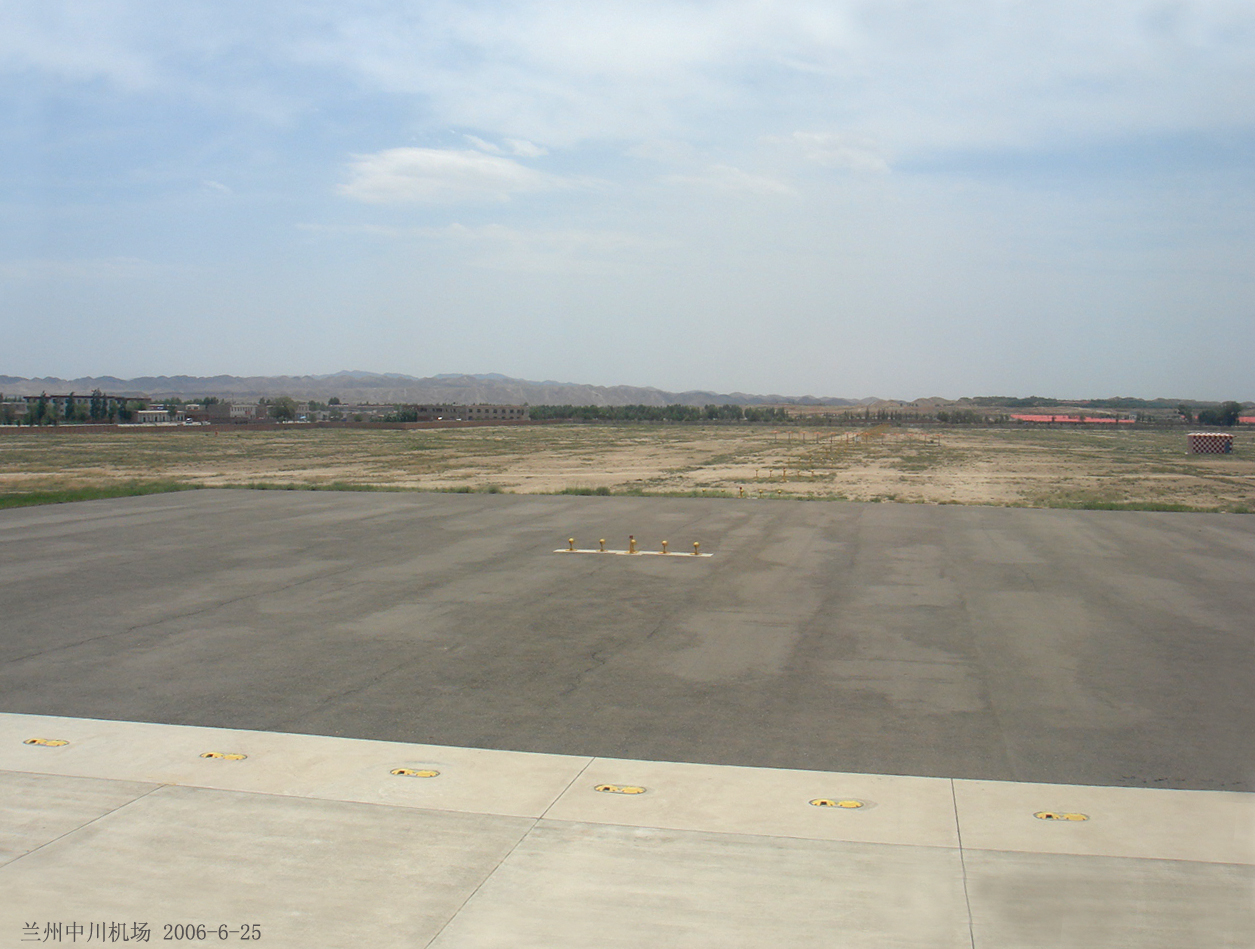

- Location within Gansu
- Coordinates: 36.51294°N 103.65948°E
- Country: People's Republic of China
- Province: Gansu
- Prefecture-level city: Lanzhou
- State-level new area: Lanzhou New Area

Zhongchuan is a town of Lanzhou New Area, China. Before 2019 it was part of Yongdeng County. In 2006 it had a population of 31,191, however by 2020, the entirety of Lanzhou New Area had a population of 450,000.

The town is located in the middle of the Qinwangchuan plain, the largest plateau basin near Lanzhou, measuring roughly 40 km (25 mi) from north to south and 16 km (9.9 mi) from east to west. The area of the plain is 470 km^{2} (180 mi^{2}) and it is elevated between 1,800 and 2,300 metres (5,900 and 7,500 ft). The plain was formed 70 million years ago with the formation of the Himalaya.

Around 200 BC, the plain was still humid, but during the Han dynasty the plain became very arid. Thanks to irrigation and new farming methods, it became a fertile agricultural area again. The town is known for its apricot orchards.

From 2018, the entirety of the original town and several villages, totaling 10.7 square kilometres (4.1 sq mi), were demolished to make way for the expansion of Lanzhou Zhongchuan International Airport, and residents were relocated to Lanzhou and Lanzhou New Area.
