= Nanjing Brain Bay =

Nanjing Brain Bay also called Nanjing Brain Bay International Talent Community. The Launching Ceremony held at Nanjing in December 2020. The development area consists of four zones: Jianye District, Jiangbei District, Jiangning District and Zidong core area.

The establishment time and area of the four zones
Establishment time	Name	Area
11 December 2020	Jianye International Talent Community	Jianye District
19 January 2021	Zidong International Talent Community	Qixia District and Zidong Core Area
23 April 2021	Jiangning International Talent Community	Jiangning District
8 June 2021	Jiangbei International Talent Community	Jiangbei New Area and Free Trade Pilot Core Area
