= Zhongchuanjichang railway station =

Railway station in Lanzhou, China

Zhongchuanjichang 中川机场
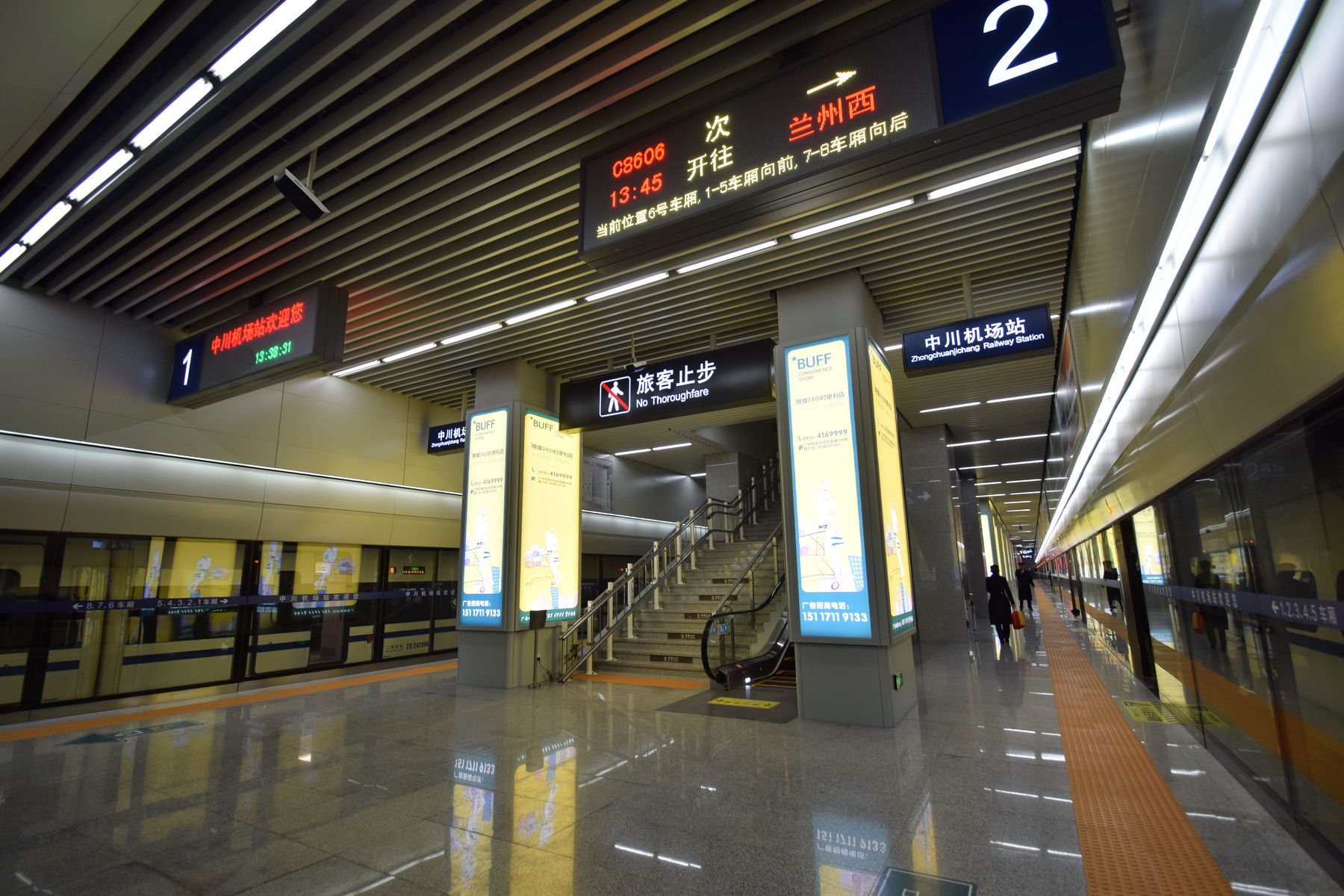

General information
- Other names: Zhongchuan Airport railway station
- Location: Yongdeng, Lanzhou, Gansu; China
- Coordinates: 36.50425°N 103.614919°E
- Operated by: Lanzhou Railway Bureau, China Railway Corporation
- Line(s): Lanzhou–Zhongchuan Airport Intercity Railway
- Platforms: 1

History
- Opened: 30 September 2015
- Closed: 20 March 2025

Zhongchuan Airport railway station or Zhongchuanjichang railway station (Chinese: 中川机场站; pinyin: Zhōngchuān Jīchǎng zhàn) is a railway station located in Yongdeng County on the Lanzhou–Zhongchuan Airport Intercity Railway, which served as Airport rail link for Terminals 1 and 2 of Lanzhou Zhongchuan International Airport. The station is close to the airport terminal. It takes about 30 minutes from the Lanzhou West railway station to the Airport.

== History ==
The station was opened on 30 September 2015, along with the railway. The station closed on 20 March 2025, and a new station (Zhongchuanjichangdong) near Terminal 3 of Lanzhou Zhongchuan International Airport opened on the same day.

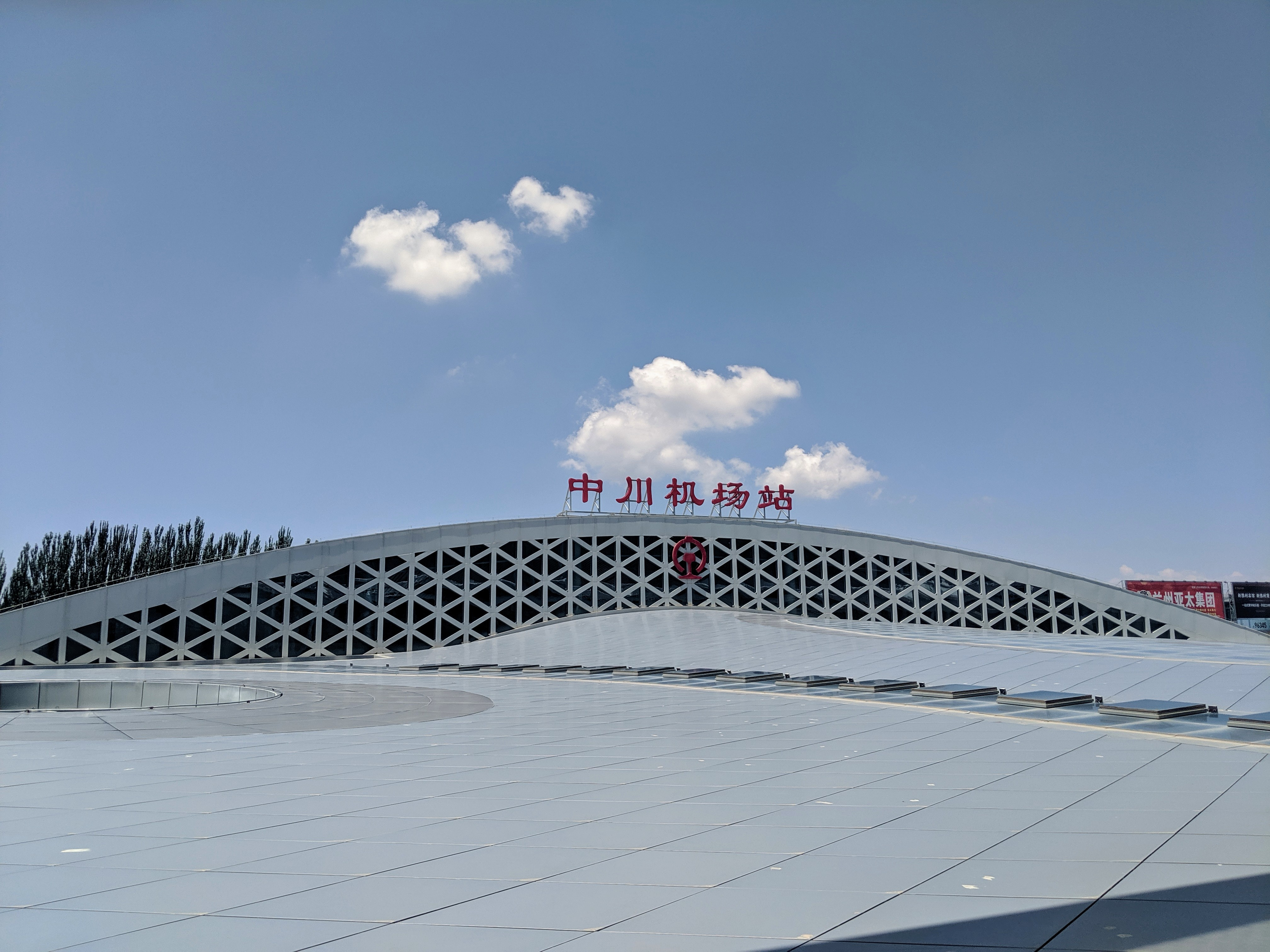
Above ground station building

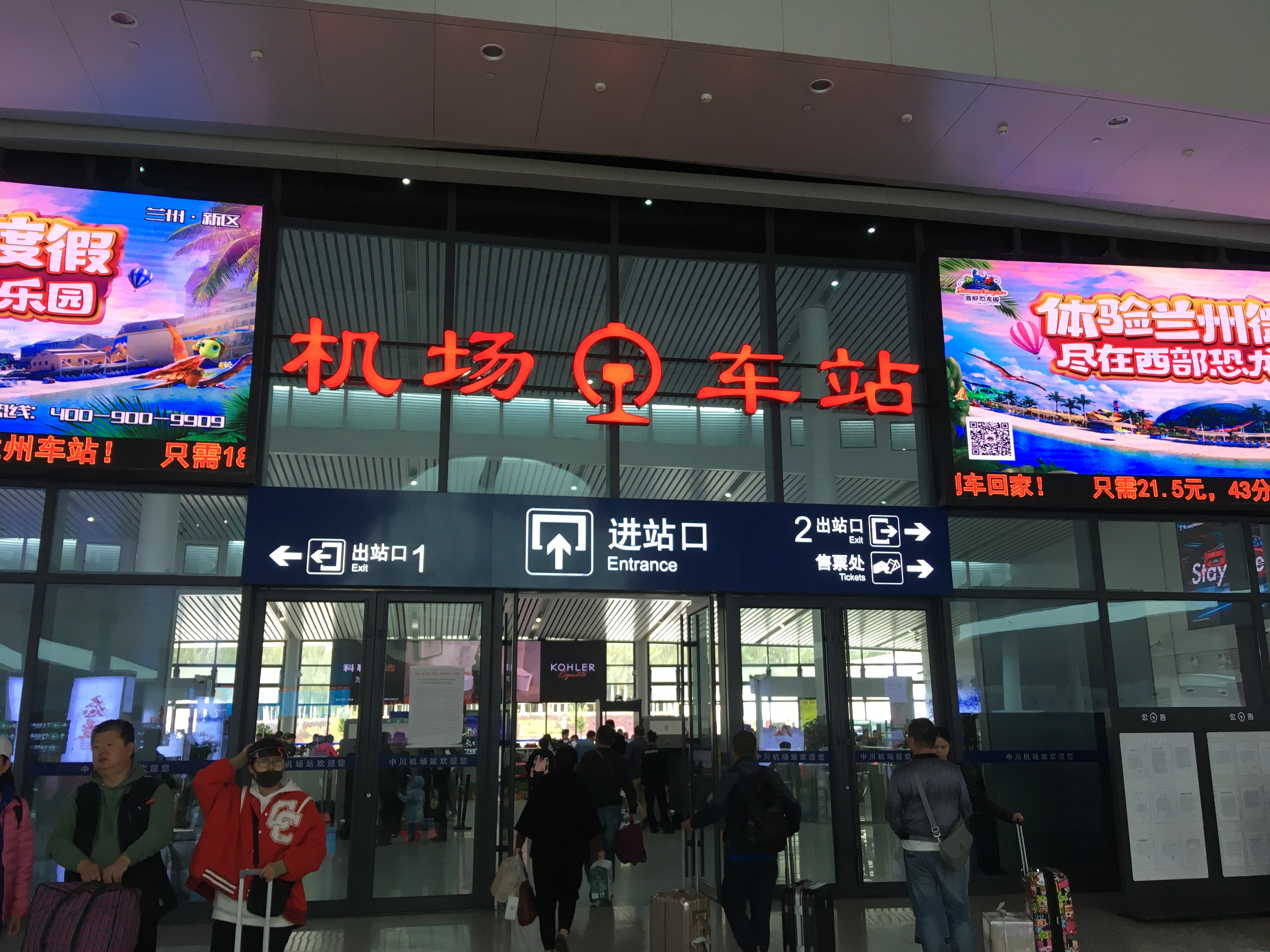
Entrance from airport terminal

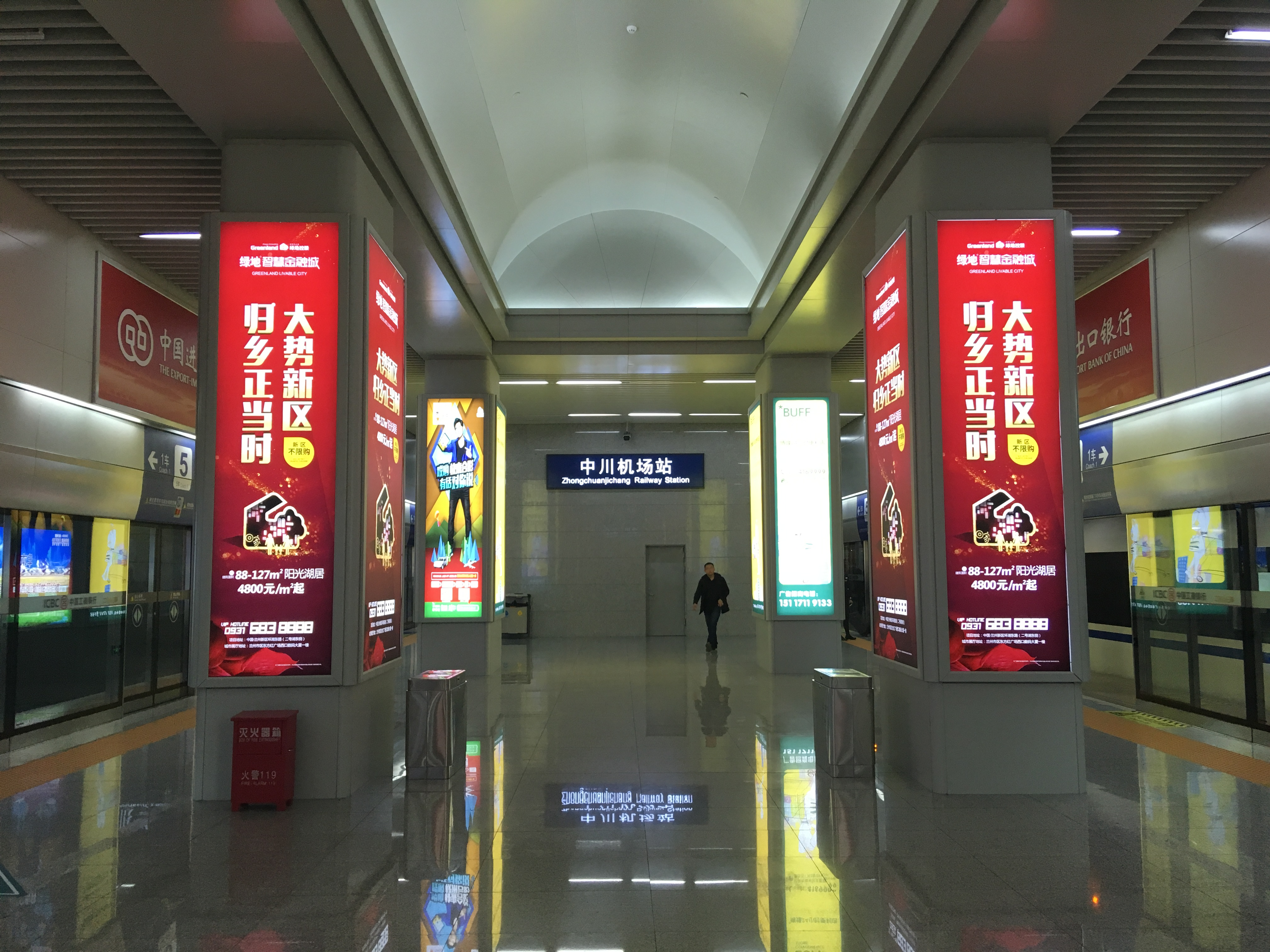
Platform level
