= Zhongchuan–Majiaping railway =

Rail line in Gansu, China

Overview
- Status: Operating
- Termini: 30 December 2013

Service
- Operator(s): China Railway High-speed

Technical
- Line length: 30.8 km (19 mi)
- Track gauge: 1,435 mm (4 ft 8 1/2 in)
- Operating speed: 160 km/h (99 mph)

The Zhongchuan–Majiaping railway is a single-track railway line in Yongdeng County, Lanzhou, Gansu, China. It is 30.8 kilometres (19.1 mi) long and has a maximum speed of 160 kilometres per hour (99 mph). It is used exclusively for freight. At its western terminus, the line connects to the Lanzhou–Xinjiang railway. At its eastern end, the line continues east as the Zhujiayao–Zhongchuan railway.
