= Lanzhou railway station =

Railway station in Lanzhou, Gansu, China

Lanzhou 兰州
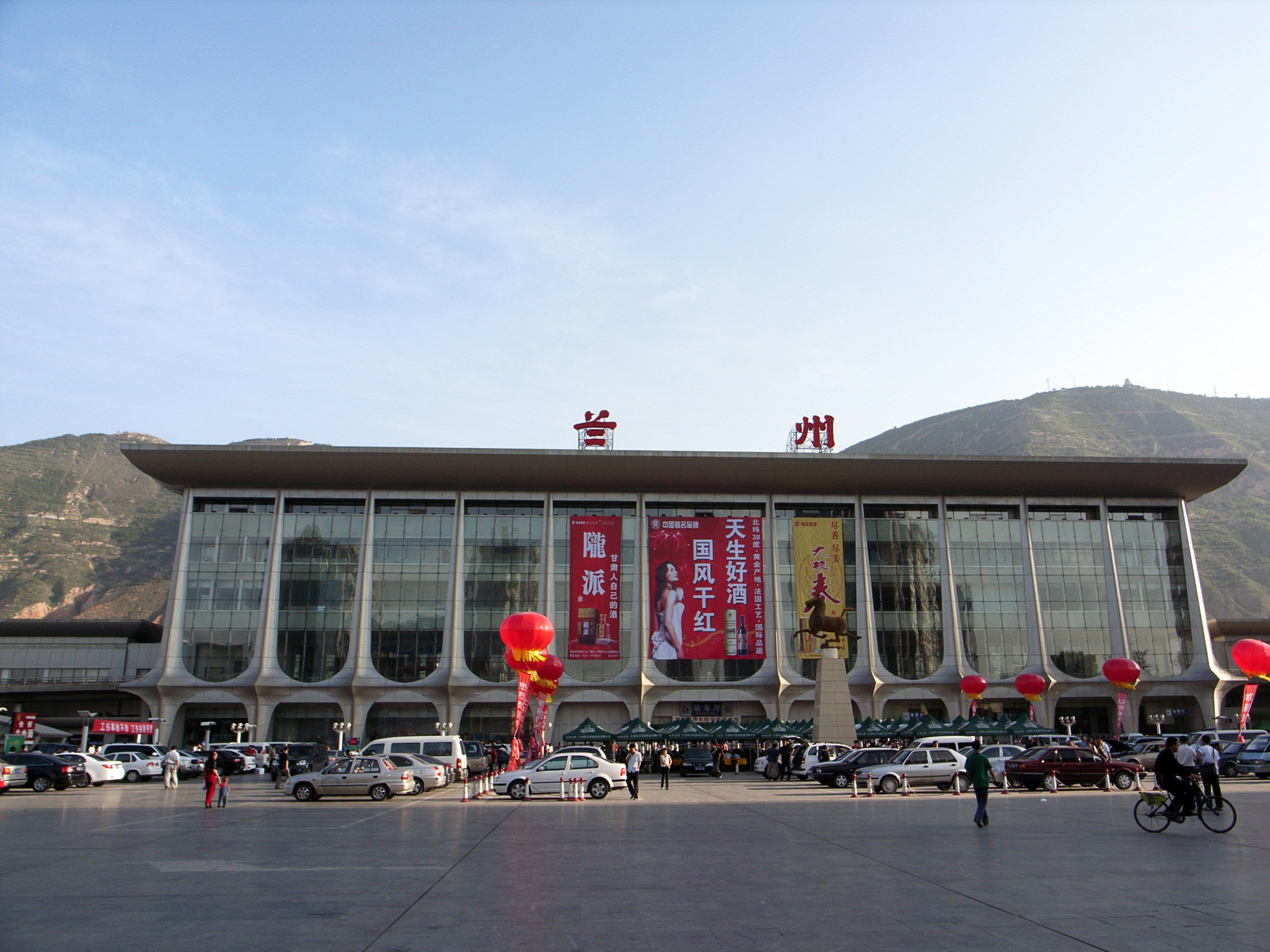

General information
- Location: 393 Huochezhan East Road; Chengguan District, Lanzhou, Gansu; China
- Coordinates: 36°02′03″N 103°51′00″E
- Operator: CR Lanzhou
- Lines: China Railway: Longhai Railway; Lanzhou–Xinjiang railway; Lanzhou–Qinghai railway; Baotou–Lanzhou railway; China Railway High-speed: Lanzhou–Chongqing railway; Lanzhou–Zhongchuan Airport intercity railway
- Platforms: 11
- Tracks: 13
- Connections: Bus terminal

Other information
- Station code: 39872 (TMIS code); LZJ (telegraph code); LZH (Pinyin code)
- Classification: Class 1 station (一等站)

History
- Opened: 1952

Services
Preceding station	China Railway	Following station
Lanzhou East towards Baotou East	Baotou–Lanzhou railway	Terminus
Lanzhou East towards Lianyungang East	Longhai railway	Terminus
Terminus	Lanzhou–Xinjiang railway	Lanzhou West towards Ürümqi South
Terminus	Lanzhou–Qinghai railway	Lanzhou West towards Xining
Preceding station	China Railway High-speed	Following station
Terminus	Lanzhou–Zhongchuan Airport intercity railway	Lanzhou West towards Zhongchuan Airport
Location
- Location within Gansu Location within China

Lanzhou railway station (simplified Chinese: 兰州站; traditional Chinese: 蘭州站; pinyin: Lánzhōu Zhàn) is a railway station located in Chengguan District, Lanzhou, Gansu Province along Huochezhan East Road (火车站东路). The station was established in October 1952, and is operated by China Railway Lanzhou Group. It handles both passenger and freight as a Class 1 station. It is served by Longhai railway, Lanzhou–Xinjiang railway and Baotou–Lanzhou railway.

== Station facilities ==
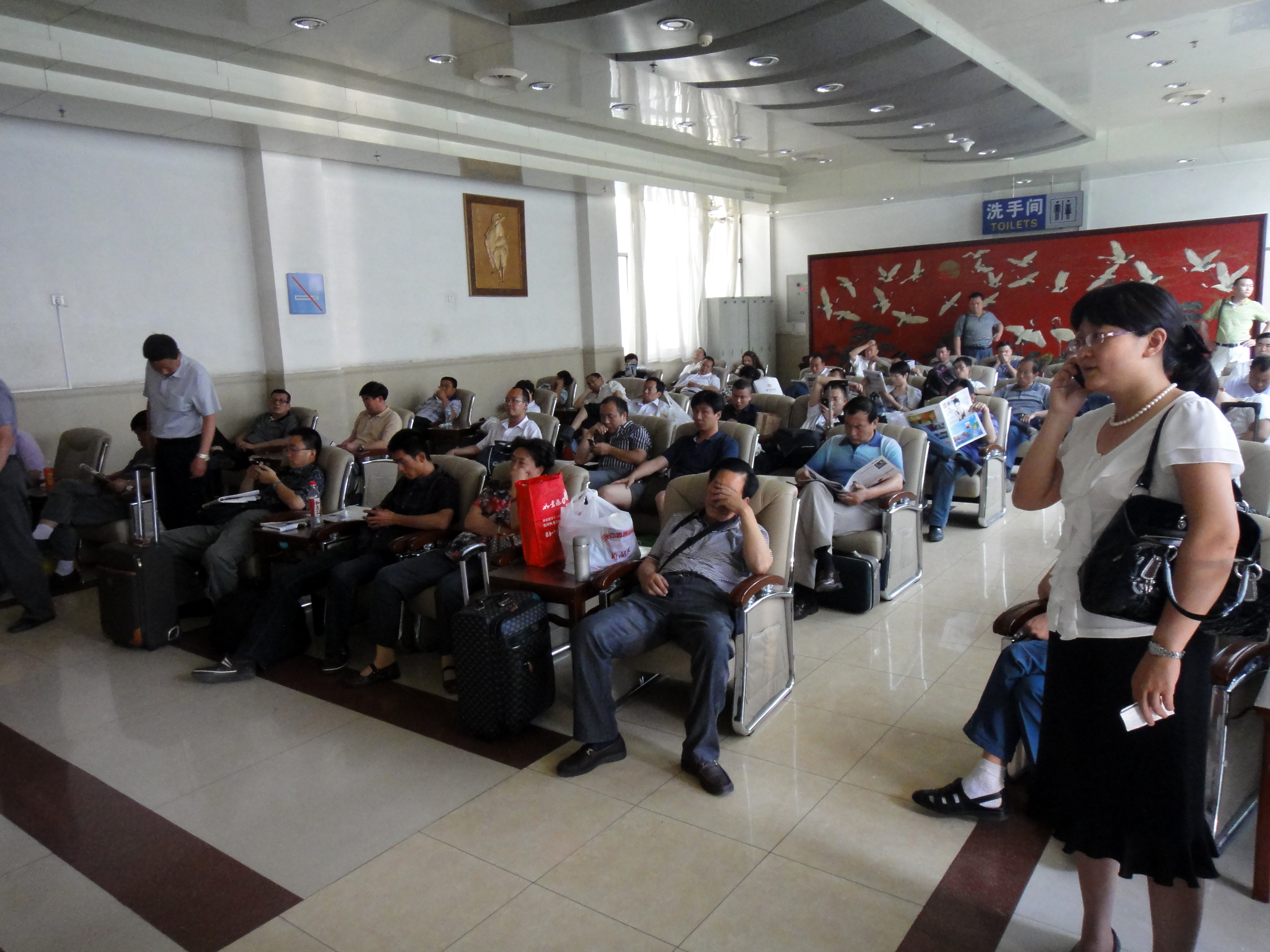
Lanzhou railway station soft seat waiting area

The station building has an area of 18,006 square meters, with a total area of 33,528 square metres with the outdoor square. It has been designed to hold 6,000 waiting passengers. It is served by an elevated footbridge across the lines, arrival and departure car ramps, escalators and central air conditioning, electronic ticketing and an electronic-oriented information inquiry system. The outdoor station square hosts a large replica of the ancient Flying Horse of Gansu, a symbol of Lanzhou.

Lanzhou station has five platforms and a total of 12 shared tracks (passenger and freight).

== Usage ==
The station is mostly used for regular speed rail services, being served by the Longhai railway, Lanzhou–Xinjiang railway and Baotou–Lanzhou railway as a major station. The average daily handling capacity is for passenger trains is about 100 trains, including various types of originating and through passenger trains.

High speed train services east to Xi'an and west to Ürümqi bypass this station via a tunnel to Lanzhou West railway station, 8 kilometres (5.0 mi) to the west. However high speed services on the Chongqing–Lanzhou railway do stop at Lanzhou station.

== Metro station ==
A station for Line 2 is opened at 29 June 2023.

== History ==
- 1 October 1952 : Lanzhou railway station was inaugurated.
- 6 June 2002: The expansion project was completed
