= Hongcheng =

Hongcheng 红城镇
- Town
- Interactive map of Hongcheng
- Country: China
- Province: Gansu
- Prefecture-level city: Lanzhou
- County: Yongdeng

Area
  - Total: 441 km^{2} (170 sq mi)

Population
  - Total: 19,010

Hongcheng is a town of Yongdeng County, Lanzhou, Gansu, China. It is located along the east bank of the Zhuanglang River, a left tributary of the Yellow River.

The town has a long history, being a former strategic military post and merchant town on the ancient Silk Road. Majiayao culture artifacts have also been found in the town. The town was established in 121 BC when the Western Han entered the Hexi Corridor. After a 1369 flood, the town was rebuilt on the eastern bank of the Zhuanglang river.

Due to the influx of tradespeople, the town is home to both Tibetan Buddhist and Mongolian culture. The Gan'en Tibetan Buddhist temple from 1494 is located in the town.
