= Lanzhou East railway station =

Railway station in Lanzhou, China

Lanzhoudong 兰州东

General information
- Location: 66 Jiaojiawan South Road; Chengguan District, Lanzhou, Gansu; China
- Coordinates: 36.029516°N 103.888533°E
- Operator: CR Lanzhou
- Lines: Longhai Railway; Lanzhou–Chongqing railway; Baotou–Lanzhou railway
- Connections: Bus terminal

Other information
- Station code: 15104 (TMIS code); LVJ (telegraph code); LZD (Pinyin code)
- Classification: Class 2 station (二等站)

History
- Opened: 1952

Services
Preceding station	China Railway	Following station
Xiaguanying towards Lianyungang East	Longhai railway	Lanzhou Terminus
Location
- Location within Gansu Location within China

Lanzhoudong (Lanzhou East) railway station (Chinese: 兰州东站; pinyin: Lánzhōudōng zhàn) is a station in Lanzhou, Gansu. The station is mainly used as a marshalling yard, only two local passenger trains a day stop at the station.

== History ==
The station was established in 1952.

== See also ==
- Lanzhou railway station
- Lanzhou West railway station
