= Lanzhou Metro =

Metro system in Lanzhou, China

Overview
- Locale: Lanzhou, Gansu, China
- Transit type: Rapid Transit
- Number of lines: 2
- Number of stations: 29
- Website: https://www.lzgdjt.com/lzgd/

Operation
- Began operation: 23 June 2019; 7 years ago
- Operators: Lanzhou Rail Transit Co., Ltd
- Number of vehicles: 20 (2019)

Technical
- System length: 34.96 km (21.7 mi)
- Track gauge: 1,435 mm (4 ft 8 1/2 in) (standard gauge)
System map

Lanzhou Metro
- Simplified Chinese: 兰州地铁
- Traditional Chinese: 蘭州地鐵
Transcriptions
Standard Mandarin
- Hanyu Pinyin: Lánzhōu Dìtiě

Lanzhou Metro or Lanzhou Rail Transit is a rapid transit system in Lanzhou, Gansu, China.

There are 34.96 kilometers (22 mi) of lines in operation, including Line 1 (25.9 km (16.1 mi)), and Line 2 (9.06 km (5.63 mi)). The first two lines will cost about 23 billion yuan ($3.6 billion).

== Lines in operation ==
Line	Terminals		Commencement	Length km	Stations
1	Chenguanying (Xigu)	Donggang (Chengguan)	2019	25.9	20
2	Yanbai Bridge (Chengguan)	Dongfanghong Square (Chengguan)	2023	9.06	9

=== Line 1 ===
Line 1 started construction on July 9, 2012, the first phase measures 25.9 kilometers (16.1 mi) with 20 stations. The line is completely underground. Line 1 opened on 23 June 2019.

=== Line 2 ===
Line 2 was planned to start construction at the end of 2015. Built in phases, the first phase is 9.06 kilometers (5.6 mi) with 9 stations. It runs from Yanbai Bridge to Dongfanghong Square, all within Chengguan District. The line has 2 transfer stations to Line 1, at Wulipu station and Dongfanghong Square station. In December 2017, tunnel boring for the second line commenced. The tunnel is at depths between 6.3 metres (21 ft) and 16.8 metres (55 ft). The line opened on 29 June 2023.

== Under planning ==
External image
- chinhoyoo. "兰州轨道交通线路图（2035+）" [Lanzhou rail transit route map (2035+)]. Archived from the original on 2 August 2020. Alt URL

In long-term planning, there will be 5 lines totaling 228 kilometers (142 mi). Due to the urban geography of Lanzhou following a river valley, most of the lines will run east-west parallel to the Yellow River. There will be lines connecting the main urban center with Lanzhou Zhongchuan Airport, Yuzhong county and Gaolan county.

=== Line 2 (Phase 2) ===
Stations

- Nanguanshizi (南关什字)
- Shuangchengmen (双城门)
- Sunjiatai (孙家台)
- Shangxiyuan (上西园)
- Lanzhou University of Technology (兰州理工大学)
- Wuwei Road (武威路)
- West Railway Station (西客站站), transfer to line 1, high speed and heavy rail
- Huoxing Road (火星路)
- Yellow River Market (黄河市场)
- Shilidian (十里店)
- Baile Square (培黎广场)
- Shuiguazhuang (水挂庄)
- Lanzhou Jiaotong University (兰州交通大学)
- Feijiaying (费家营)
- Cuijiazhuang (崔家庄)
- Majiazhuang (马家庄)
- Huangjiatan (黄家滩)
- Xiahewan (下河湾)

=== Line 3 ===
Line 3 is entirely in the planning phase. Unlike the first two lines, it will have above-ground sections. A road-rail bridge is planned to carry Line 3 over the Yellow River, continuing its route above ground.

Stations

- Railway station (火车站), transfer to Lanzhou Railway Station
- Hezheng Road (和政路)
- Five springs square (五泉广场)
- Zhengning Road (正宁路)
- Xiguan (西关), transfer to line 1
- Miaotanzi (庙滩子)
- Caochang Street (草场街)
- Yanchangbao (盐场堡)
- Xingangcheng (新港城)
- Yanxi Road (雁西路)
- Yanbei Road (雁北路), transfer to line 2
- Arts college (文理学院)
- Baidaoping (白道坪)
- Doudaogou (陡道沟)

=== Line 4 ===
Line 4 is entirely in the planning phase.

Stations

- Yantan Road (雁滩路)
- Yantanshizi (雁滩什字)
- Yanyuan Road (雁园路), transfer to line 2
- Yanxing Road (雁兴路)
- Yandong Street (雁东街)
- Fanjiawan (范家湾)
- Donggang (东岗), transfer to line 1
- Heping (和平)
- Weiliu Road (纬六路)
- Dingyuan (定远)
- New Technology City (科技新城)

=== Line 5 ===
Line 5 is entirely in the planning phase and is planned to be from Chengguan District to Lanzhou Zhongchuan Airport via Zhonghe town in Gaolan County.

== Technology ==
=== Rolling stock ===
Line 1 is served by a fleet of 26 Type A rolling stock trainsets of 6 cars each, with a capacity of 2460 passengers per trainset. Each set is 139.98 m (459 ft 3 in) long, 3.09 m (10 ft 2 in) wide and 3.8 m (12 ft 6 in) high. The rolling stock is manufactured in Changchun by China's CRRC. The train sets are developed to be able to withstand sand storms, and feature aluminium bodywork with sand resistant paint, sand resistant glass, and the ventilation system is designed to handle large amounts of dust in the air.

Production of the first trains started in March 2016. In October 2016, the first two metro trains were delivered.

A few of the trainsets in service on Line 1 carry the colour scheme of Line 2 which is still under construction.

=== Payment system ===
All stations have ticket barriers which can be entered using China T-union cards, either personally bound, or bought for single journeys from ticketing machines.

Since December 2019, passengers can also pay using the Tencent Ride app (zh:騰訊乘車碼).
