= Line 1 (Lanzhou Metro) =

Metro line in Lanzhou, China

- 1
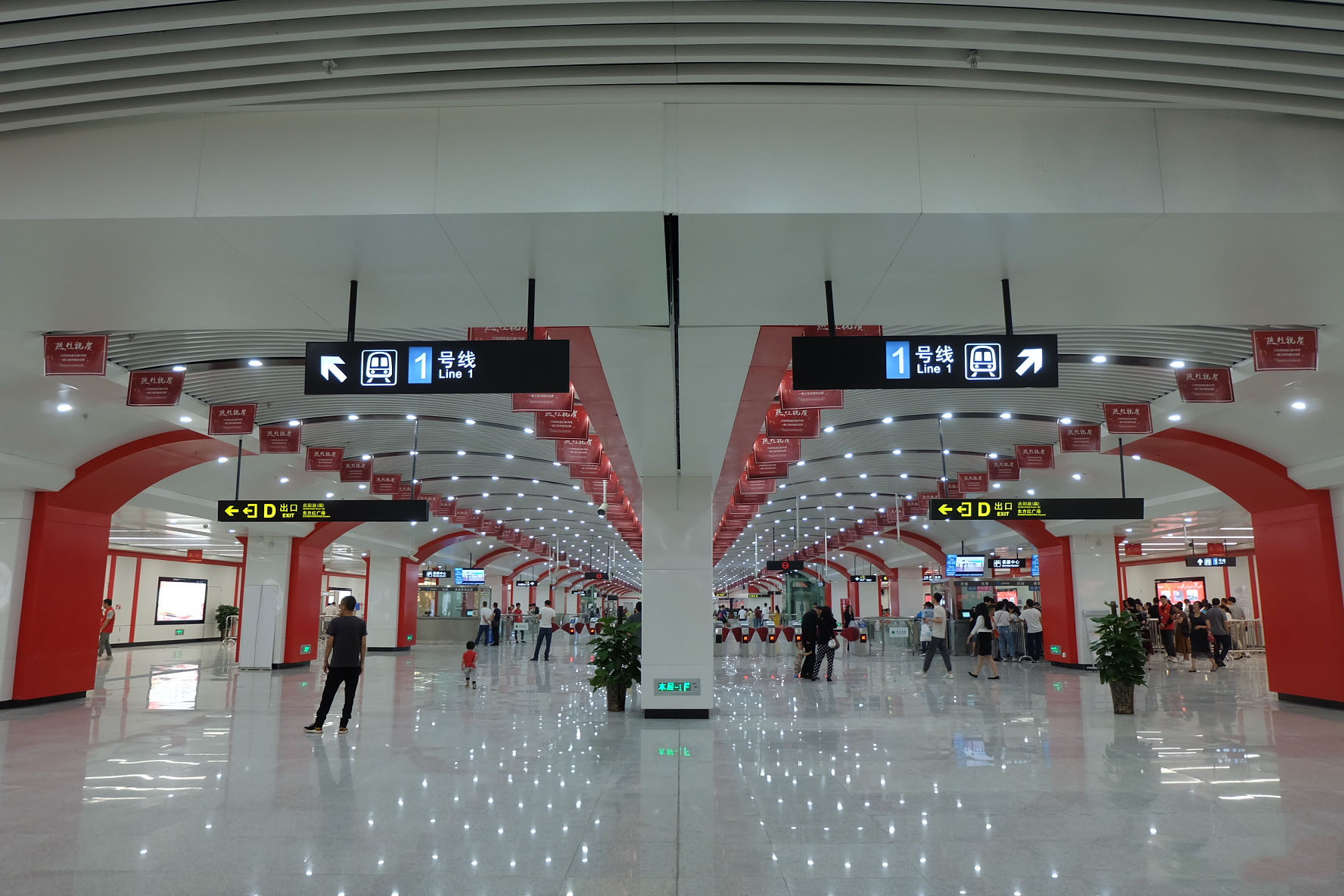
- Dongfanghong Square station

Overview
- Locale: Lanzhou, Gansu, China
- Termini: Donggang; Chenguanying
- Stations: 20

Service
- Type: Rapid transit
- System: Lanzhou Metro
- Operator(s): Lanzhou Rail Transit Co., Ltd.

History
- Opened: 23 June 2019; 6 years ago

Technical
- Line length: 25.9 km (16.09 mi)
- Number of tracks: 2
- Character: Underground
- Track gauge: 1,435 mm (4 ft 8 1/2 in)
- Operating speed: 80 km/h

Line 1
- Simplified Chinese: 兰州地铁1号线
- Traditional Chinese: 蘭州地鐵1號線
Transcriptions
Standard Mandarin
- Hanyu Pinyin: Lánzhōu Dìtiě Yī Hào Xiàn

Line 1 of the Lanzhou Metro is a subway line in Lanzhou, China running from Donggang to Chenguanying. It has 20 stations and is 25.9 kilometres (16.1 mi) long. It opened on 23 June 2019.

== History ==
Line 1 started construction on July 9, 2012. Line 1 is 25.9 kilometers (16.1 mi) with 20 stations. The line is completely underground. Line 1 opened on 23 June 2019. The operating speed will be 80 kilometres per hour (50 mph). The stations are fitted with platform screen doors. The first two metro lines in Lanzhou will cost about 23 billion yuan ($3.6 billion) and be completed by 2020.

On 22 October 2015, a fire broke out at the construction site of Donggang station. No casualties were reported by authorities.

The China Association of Metros (CAMET) has awarded an innovation award for the techniques used for the tunnel sections of Line 1's first phase under the Yellow River. Line 1 is the first subway in China to tunnel under the Yellow River.

=== Opening timeline ===
Segment	Commencement	Length	Station(s)	Name
Donggang — Chenguanying	23 June 2019	25.9 km (16.09 mi)	19	Phase 1
Gansu Provincial Government	28 September 2020	Infill station	1	

== Stations ==
station name		Transfer	Distance km		Location
English	Chinese	Transfer	Distance km		Location
Chenguanying	陈官营	^{[A]}	0.00	0.00	Xigu
Olympic Sports Center (Note: Was South Shen'an Bridge until 22 November 2023)	奥体中心		1.40	1.40	Qilihe
Lanzhou City University (Gansu Science & Technology Museum)	兰州城市学院（省科技馆）		2.49	3.89	Anning
Lanzhou Customs	兰州海关		0.88	4.77	Anning
Matan	马滩		2.14	6.91	Qilihe
Tumendun	土门墩		1.52	8.43	Qilihe
North Square of Lanzhou West Railway Station	兰州西站北广场	LZ	1.09	9.52	Qilihe
Xizhanshizi	西站什字	Lanzhou BRT	1.72	11.24	Qilihe
Qilihe	七里河		0.96	12.20	Qilihe
Xiaoxihu Park	小西湖		1.43	13.63	Qilihe
Cultural Palace	文化宫		0.85	14.48	Qilihe
Xiguan	西关		1.02	15.50	Chengguan
Gansu Provincial Government	省政府		1.06	16.56	Chengguan
Dongfanghong Square	东方红广场	2	1.22	17.78	Chengguan
Lanzhou University	兰州大学		1.59	19.37	Chengguan
Wulipu	五里铺	2	1.30	20.67	Chengguan
Gansu Meteorological Bureau	省气象局		1.28	21.95	Chengguan
Gongxingdun	拱星墩		1.17	23.12	Chengguan
Jiaojiawan	焦家湾		1.07	24.19	Chengguan
Donggang	东岗		1.25	25.44	Chengguan

^{A} The station is only serviced once per day by China Railway as of 2019

== Operation ==
The line averaged 230,800 passengers daily during October 2020, with the busiest station being North Square of Lanzhou West Railway Station followed by Xiguan and Lanzhou University.

=== Fares ===
The fare price is distance based as following:

Distance (km)	Fare
0–4	CN¥ 2
4–8	CN¥ 3
8–12	CN¥ 4
12–18	CN¥ 5
18–24	CN¥ 6
24–32	CN¥ 7
32–40	CN¥ 8

=== Service ===
Trains run between 6:30 until 22:00. The travel time between the two termini is roughly 45 minutes. It is understood that the initial operation time of Line 1 is from 6:30 to 22:00, and the daily operation service is 15 hours and 30 minutes. The single-line operation time is about 45 minutes, giving an average travel speed of 34 kilometres per hour (21 mph).
