= Zhoushan Archipelago New Area =

Zhoushan Archipelago 舟山群岛新区
- State-level new area
- Zhoushan Archipelago New Area
- Country: People's Republic of China
- Province: Zhejiang
- Prefecture-level city: Zhoushan
- Time zone: UTC+8 (China Standard)

Zhoushan Archipelago, officially known as Zhoushan Archipelago New Area (simplified Chinese: 舟山群岛新区; traditional Chinese: 舟山群島新區; pinyin: Zhōushān Qúndǎo Xīn Qū), is a state-level new area (special economic and political administration zone) under the direct control of Zhoushan Municipal Government on 7 July 2011. Zhoushan Archipelago New Area was approved by the State Council of China's Central Government as the fourth state-level new area (following Pudong of Shanghai, Binhai of Tianjin, and Liangjiang of Chongqing), which is also the second state-level new development area in East China.
