= Lanzhou Petrochemical Refinery =

Oil refinery in Lanzhou, China

Coordinates: 36.119795°N 103.602442°E

- Nightview of Lanzhou Petrochemical Refinery
- Formerly: Lanzhou Oil Refinery
- Industry: Petroleum Refining
- Founded: 1956
- Headquarters: Xigu District, Lanzhou, Gansu
- Parent: PetroChina Lanzhou Petrochemical Company

Lanzhou Petrochemical Refinery, formerly known as the Lanzhou Oil Refinery, is a state-owned oil refinery in Xigu District, Lanzhou, Gansu, China. It is one of the principal refining bases of PetroChina Lanzhou Petrochemical Company. Initially constructed in the 1950s during China's First Five-Year Plan as one of the 156 major industrial projects built with Soviet assistance, it is the first large-scale modern oil refinery constructed in the People's Republic of China.

Construction of the first phase of the refinery began in 1956, and it officially entered operation in September 1958. Designed primarily to process crude oil extracted from the Yumen Oilfield, its completion established China's first large-scale modern refining capacity, marking a major advance in the scale and technological level of the country's petroleum refining industry.

The refinery has since experienced several rounds of expansion and reorganization. In the 1990s, it was restructured as the Lanzhou Refining and Chemical Complex; in 2000, it was merged with the Lanzhou Chemical Industry Company and other enterprises, gradually forming the integrated refining and petrochemical production system of what is now Lanzhou Petrochemical Company.

Today, Lanzhou Petrochemical is an important refining and petrochemical base in Western China. In 2025, the historical facilities of Lanzhou Refinery and Lanzhou Chemical Industry Company were jointly listed as the industrial heritage sites in the province of Gansu.

== History ==
=== Early planning ===
In the early years of the People's Republic of China, the country had a feeble oil-refining industry. In 1949, just three small-sized refineries were in operation nationwide, producing a combined total of about 35,000 tonnes of gasoline, kerosene, and diesel. Per capita petroleum consumption was below 0.2 kilograms, and roughly 90 percent of refined petroleum products relied on imports from foreign nations.

As the national economy recovered and the First Five-Year Plan was introduced, the development of large-scale modern oil-refining capacity became a major priority in the expansion of China's petroleum industry. In 1951, Xi Zhongxun, then secretary of the Chinese Communist Party Northwest Bureau, proposed extracting the petroleum resources of northwestern China and building a refinery in Lanzhou.

The reason behind this decision was that up until the discovery of the Daqing Oilfield, the nation's largest oilfield was located at Yumen in Gansu, while Lanzhou lay at the western end of the Longhai Railway, placing it about 600 kilometres by rail from China's major industrial regions in the east. Lanzhou was therefore chosen as the preferred site for the new refinery. Subsequent surveys in Gansu were carried out in parallel with preparations for the fertilizer plant and the synthetic rubber plant.

According to An Jianglin, former director of the Institute of Regional Economics at the Gansu Academy of Social Sciences, both Yuzhong and Xigu, on the eastern and western sides of Lanzhou, respectively, were considered possible sites for the refinery. Yuzhong was ultimately crossed out because of its poorer water supply and the higher cost required to construct adequate infrastructure for water diversion, and the refinery subsequently landed in Xigu, about 20 kilometres west of central Lanzhou and close to the Yellow River.

Construction scene in Lanzhou Oil Refinery, workers were seen welding an oil storage tank on the ground using the "reverse-assembly" method, 1957

Another angle of the construction site

The inspection of Lanzhou Oil Refinery by Deng Xiaoping on April 5, 1957

=== First phase of production ===
On August 2, 1958, the first trainload of crude oil from Yumen arrived at the Lanzhou Oil Refinery.

On 2 August 1958, the first train carrying crude oil from the Yumen Oilfield arrived at the Lanzhou Oil Refinery.

The refinery's first crude-oil electro-desalting unit entered operation on 13 September, and on 18 September the plant produced its first batch of gasoline, kerosene, diesel and other refined products. The completion of the refinery marked the commissioning of China's first large-scale modern oil refinery, and significantly reduced the country's dependence on imported petroleum products. As part of the celebrations, gasoline produced at the refinery was sent to Beijing for use during the National Day ceremonies that year.

After the refinery entered production, changes in domestic and international oil supplies promptedfurther expansion. The development of the Daqing Oilfield rapidly increased domestic crude-oil output, while the worsening Sino-Soviet relations led to a sharp drop in the import of petrol products from the Soviet Union, particularly military fuels. The government therefore placed greater emphasis on the development of domestically produced military and specialty oils. Lanzhou Oil Refinery was thus assigned with tasks to research and develop the gasoline and kerosene for aviation, lubricant as well as heavy fuel oil.

To support this work, the refinery established a research institute and organized more than 160 technical teams to conduct experiments on feedstock properties, processing conditions and product formulations. In 1960, aviation gasoline was trial-produced using a fluid catalytic cracking unit. Ground and flight tests were carried out between June and October, and the product was approved for trial use in December. In 1962, the refinery successfully produced No.20 aviation lubricating oil that met the required quality standards.

By 1966, the Lanzhou Oil Refinery was processing more than 1.2 million tones of crude oil annually and was capable of producing 137 different petroleum products.

=== Cultural Revolution ===
In 1966, the outbreak of the Cultural Revolution severely disrupted the refinery's daily operation. A Cultural Revolution Committee was established at the plant in August, followed by the emergence of several mass organizations. Between January and February 1967, the rebel faction "Lanzhou Refinery Revolutionary Workers' Alliance" (兰炼革工联) seized power within the plant, bringing its administration into a state of paralysis, while suspension of a number of internal regulations resulted in deteriorating production quality and output.

On 13 February 1967, a military control commission was dispatched by the Lanzhou Military Region to the refinery, and production in the refinery was resumed along military lines, and later in January 1968 Party and administrative authority returned once again with the establishment of the revolutionary committee. According to the refinery's official history, chaos and upheaval during this period had resulted in the loss of 1.28 million yuan in 1968, its first ever serious loss since entering production.

=== Reform era ===
From the 1980s onward, the Lanzhou Oil Refinery entered a period of institutional and economic adjustment as China pursued reform and opening-up and gradually introduced market-oriented reforms into the state-owned sector. Like many other large state-owned industrial enterprises at the time, the refinery struggled to adapt to the new economic reality due to its ageing facilities, rigid management structures, and decling revenues.

The gas flare of Lanzhou Petrolchemical refinery

During the following decade, the refinery underwent a series of organizational and managerial reforms as part of the broader restructuring of China's state-owned enterprises. These reforms eventually led to the reorganization of the refinery in the 1990s and its later integration into Lanzhou Petrochemical.

Fearing a rise in inflation, the Chinese government commanded many state-owned enterprises in western China to continue supplying their products nationwide at administratively set prices below prevailing market levels. At the same time, manufactuers in eastern China were increasingly given the green light to sell goods at the more advantageous market prices under the dual-track pricing system. This placed growing hurdle to the on the fiscal situation of Lanzhou Oil Refinery and Lanzhou Petrochemical, even as they continued to produce refined petroleum products, fertilizers, plastics and other goods. By the late 1990s, the two companies reportedly recorded losses of approximately 590 million yuan and 680 million yuan respectively, and Lanzhou Petrochemical was classified as a "financially distressed enterprise".

=== Restructuring ===
Around 1999, China National Petroleum Corporation (CNPC) began restructuring its branch in Lanzhou by separating the core listed businesses from non-listed operations, spinning off ancillary activities and enterprise-run social duties, and reducing and reorganizing the workforce. In August 1999, the former Lanzhou Oil Refinery was formally reorganized as Lanzhou Refining and Chemical Company. In October 2000, it was merged with Lanzhou Petrochemical Company to form PetroChina Lanzhou Petrochemical Company.

== Legacy ==
=== Impact on Lanzhou's urban development ===
The founding of Lanzhou Oil Refinery had left a permanent footprint on the demographic growth and urban development of Lanzhou, particularly in Xigu. During the early years of construction, more than 16,000 young educated industrial workers and technical professionals were recruited from northeastern China, Beijing, Tianjin, Hebei, Shaanxi, Sichuan and other regions to take part in the industrial development of western Lanzhou. Participants later recalled that Xigu up until that point was still a rural backwater with little to no paved roads, and it was the large-scale construction led by state that radically transformed the local landscape.

Housing and public amenities were built to accommodate workers of the refinery. Construction of the first four apartment blocks in the Xigu welfare district—Nos. 93, 95, 98A and 98B—began in March 1955 and was completed the following year. They were among the earliest modern residential buildings in Xigu. The subsequent erection of schools, hospitals and other public facilities contributed to the transformation of Xigu from a remote suburb into one of Lanzhou's principal industrial districts.

=== Economic impact ===
Economically, the refinery became an important source of industrial output and fiscal revenue for Lanzhou. Between 1958 and 1987, it reportedly generated approximately 6.3 billion yuan in profits and taxes, around eight times the total state investment made in the enterprise, and was at one point ranked among China's top 50 enterprises by profits and tax contributions.

Together with Lanzhou's petrochemical, machinery and textile industries, the refinery helped establish the city's status as a major centre of heavy industry in northwestern China, and had propelled it—originally an economically marginalized inland city—into the ranks of China's top twenty cities by economic output during the 1970s.

=== Environmental pollution ===
The rapid industrialization of Xigu also created long-term environmental consequences. Early planners did not anticipate that the industrial district would eventually become contiguous with Lanzhou's main urban area, and environmental considerations played only a limited role in the original choice of location. As the city expanded westward, emissions from petrochemical production became one of the major environmental concerns affecting Xigu and the wider Lanzhou urban area.

=== Industrial heritage ===
In September 2025, the "Lanzhou Petrochemical Industrial Heritage Group," comprising historical facilities associated with the former Lanzhou Oil Refinery and Lanzhou Chemical Industry Company, was officially listed in the third batch of Gansu's provincial-level industrial heritage sites.
