= Dongfanghong Square =

Central public space in Lanzhou, China

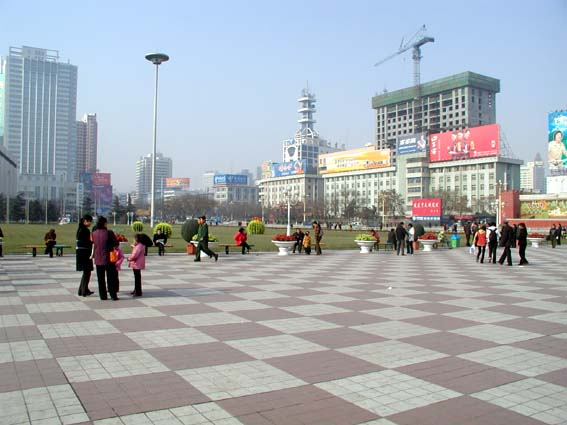
- Dongfanghong Square in 2011
- Interactive map of Dongfanghong Square
- Native name: 东方红广场 (Chinese)
- Length: 638 metres (2,093 ft)
- Width: 155 metres (509 ft)
- Area: 92,172 square metres (992,130 sq ft)
- Coordinates: 36.05282°N 103.84055°E

Dongfanghong Square is a large square and park in Lanzhou, China. It is located centrally in the city. On the west side, a stadium is located and on the east side the Guofang Department Store mall is located.

The square was given its current name 1968, with fountains and grass patches added in 1981. The stadium on the west side was built in 1984. In 1993, a partially underground shopping mall was constructed, and the square was enlarged. It maximum width is 638 metres (2,093 ft) from east to west, 155 metres (509 ft) from north to south, with a total surface area of 92,172 square metres (992,130 sq ft).

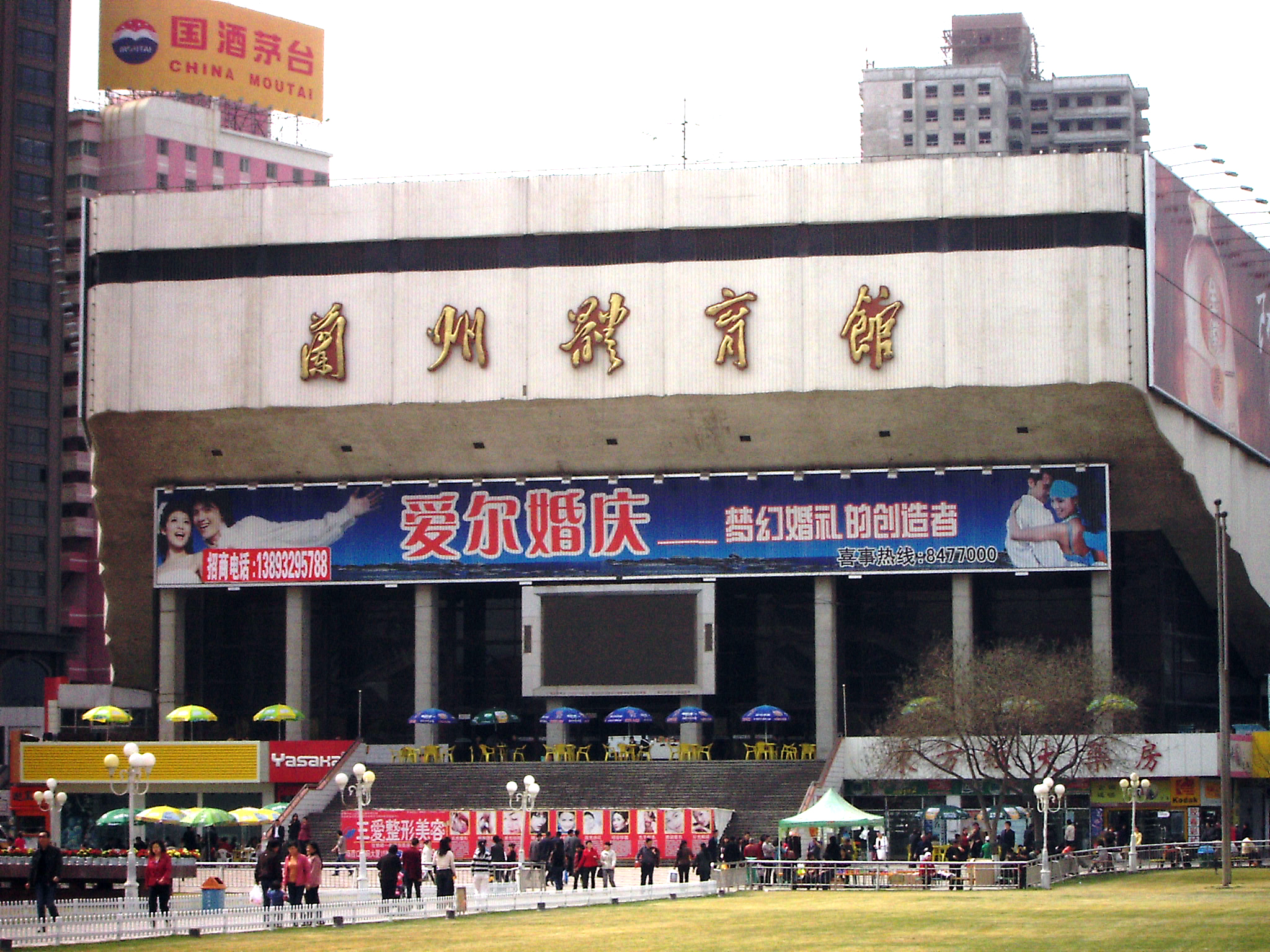
Stadium at the square

== Metro Station ==
Dongfanghong Square 东方红广场站
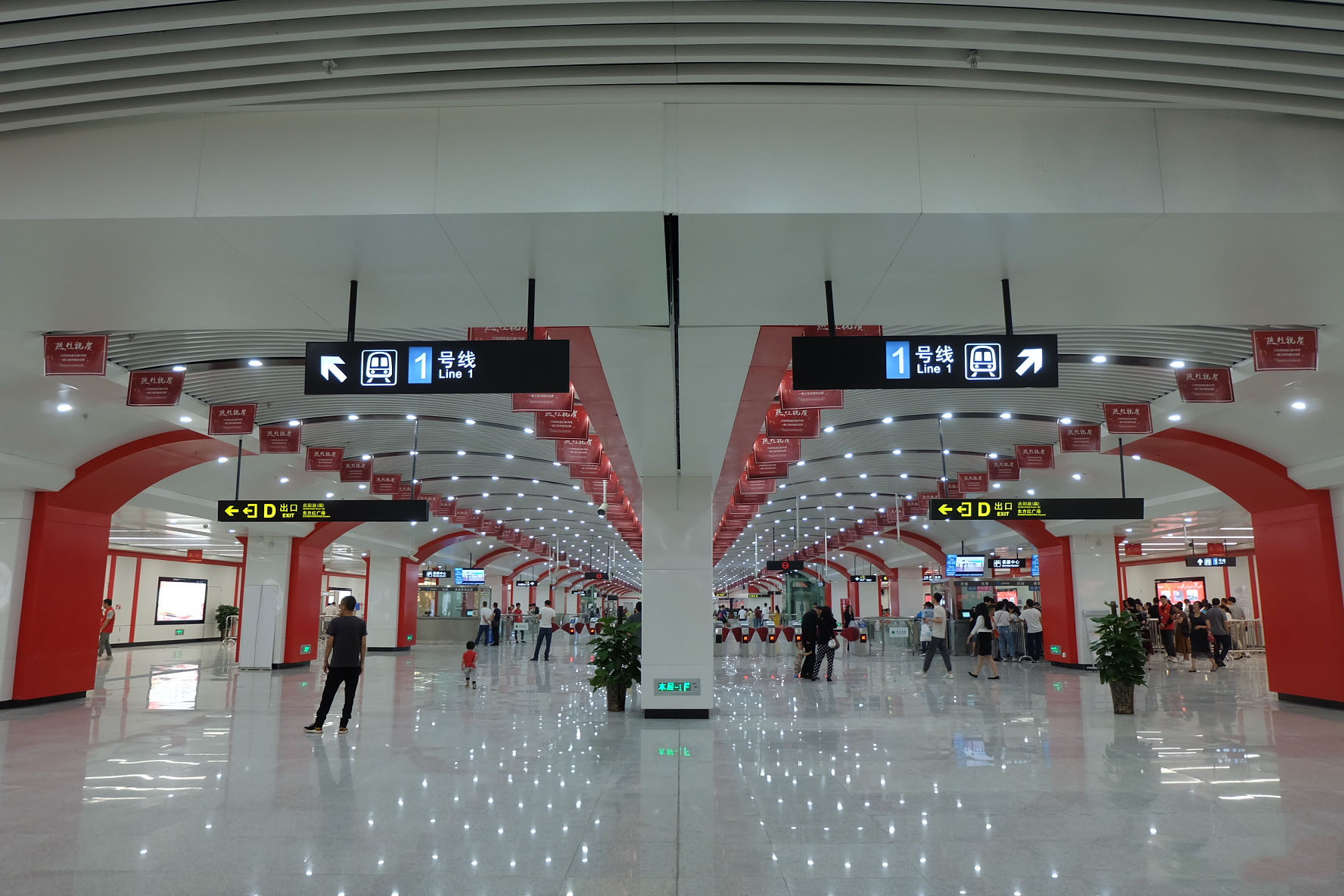

General information
- Operator: Lanzhou Rail Transit
- Lines: Line 1 Line 2
- Platforms: 2
- Tracks: 2

History
- Opened: 23 June 2019
Location

Dongfanghong Square metro station is located at the north side of the square, it is served by Line 1 and Line 2 of the Lanzhou Metro.
