= Zhuanglang River =

Tributary of the Yellow River

- Location of mouth in Gansu
- Native name: 庄浪河 (Chinese)

Location
- Country: China
- Province: Gansu

Physical characteristics
- Mouth
  - coordinates: 36.17423°N 103.44311°E
- Length: 184.8 km (114.8 mi)
- Basin size: 4,008 km^{2} (1,547 sq mi)

Basin features
- River system: Yellow River

The Zhuanglang River is a river in the central part of Gansu Province, China. It is a left tributary of the Yellow River. Its source is in Zhuaxixiulong in the northwest of Tianzhu (Bairi) Tibetan Autonomous County, Wuwei City, on the eastern end of the Qilian Mountains. The river flows from northwest to southeast through Tianzhu and Yongdeng County, with a total length of 184.8 kilometres long, and a watershed area of 4,008 km^{2}. The valley of the Zhuanglang River was the main route of the eastern part of the Hexi Corridor on the ancient Silk Road. Nowadays, the G30 Lianhuo Expressway, China National Highway G312 and the Lanzhou-Xinjiang Railway all run along the river, making it a major traffic route between China proper and the northwestern areas.
