= Lanzhou–Chongqing railway =

Railway line in China

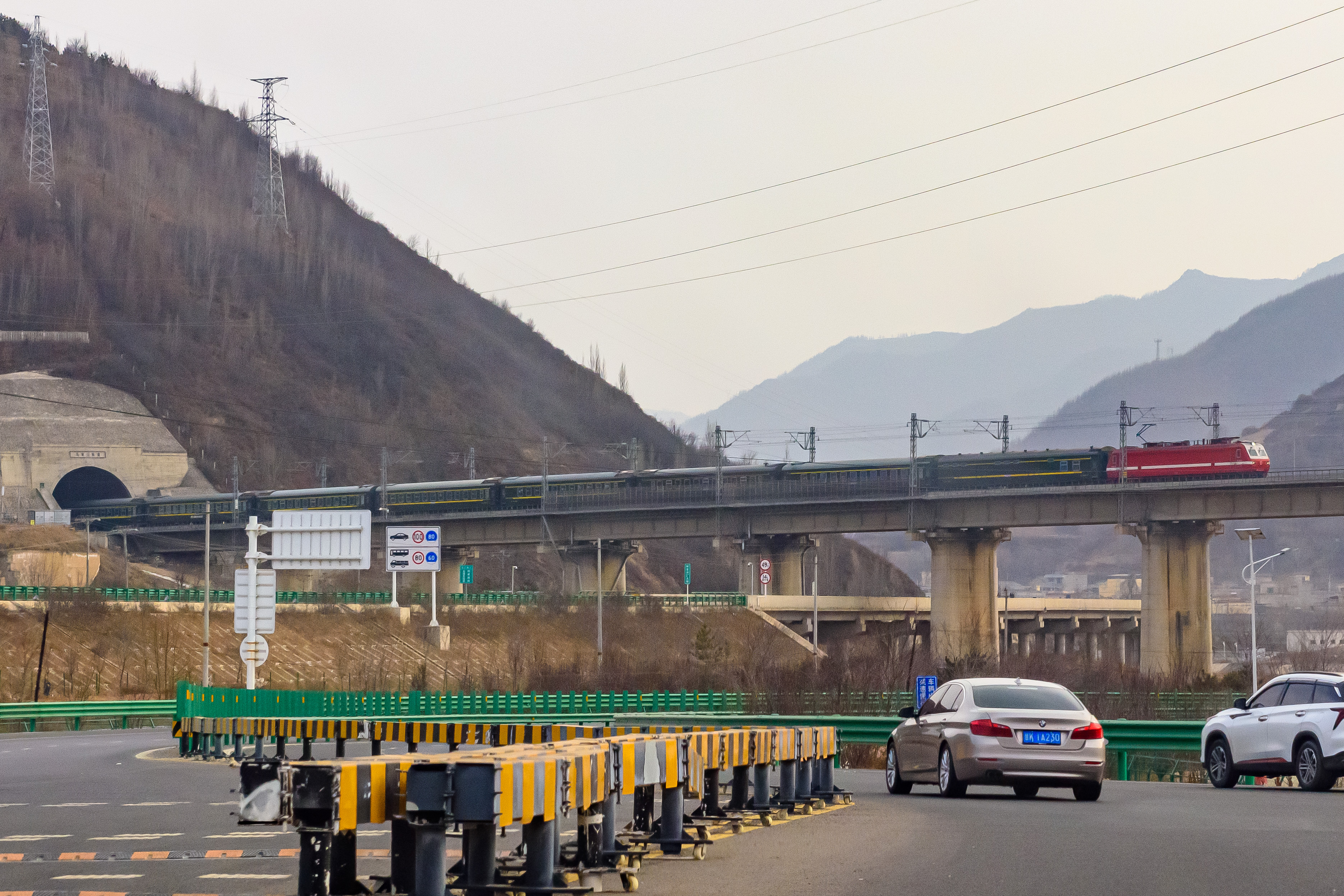
- Viaduct of Lanzhou–Chongqing railway above G75 in Tanchang County, Longnan

Overview
- Other name: Lanyu railway (兰渝铁路)
- Status: Operational Chongqing - Guangyuan opened Dec 2015; Guangyuan - Minxian opened Dec 2016 Minxian - Lanzhou opened Sep 2017
- Locale: China
- Termini: Lanzhou East; Chongqing

Service
- Type: Higher-speed rail, Heavy rail
- Services: 1
- Operator(s): China Railway Chengdu Group & China Railway Lanzhou Group

Technical
- Line length: 832 km (517 mi)
- Track gauge: 1,435 mm (4 ft 8 1/2 in)
- Electrification: Electrified
- Operating speed: 200 km/h (Chongqing-Guangyuan) 160 km/h (Guangyuan-Lanzhou)

Lanzhou–Chongqing railway or Lanyu railway (Chinese: 兰渝铁路; pinyin: Lán-Yú tiělù, "Lan" and "Yu" being the abbreviations for Lanzhou and Chongqing) is a higher-speed railway in China connecting Lanzhou and Chongqing. Construction started in 2010, last segment of the railway was opened for service in September 2017. The line allows trains to travel between Chongqing and Lanzhou, Gansu via Nanchong and Guangyuan, Sichuan.

== Introduction ==
With a total length of 820 km (510 mi), of which 435 km (270 mi) is located within Gansu Province, in addition to the construction of a branch to Nanchong and Guang'an that is 95 km (59 mi) long. It was built as a new double line electrified railway, with freight train capable of up to 160 km/h (99 mph), passenger trains traveling at 200 km/h (124 mph). The capacity of the line is expected at 50 train pairs per day and 50,000,000 tonnes of freight per year. The railway is designed to permit double-stack container operations.

Lanzhou–Chongqing railway project was estimated to need a total investment of 77.4 billion yuan, of which the Gansu Provincial Government invested about 43 billion yuan, with the rest of the funding was coming from a Ministry of Railways, Sichuan and Chongqing joint construction effort. The construction period was expected to take 6 years. By the completion of the railway rail transport from Lanzhou and Chongqing is shortened from 1,466 kilometres (911 mi) to 820 kilometres (510 mi), conventional train running time is reduced to 7 hours from 17.5 hours. Fast trains will complete the route in 5.5 hours.

Recent high speed rail reforms has also meant direct Chengdu-Lanzhou and Chongqing-Xi'an services will use a combination of Xi'an–Chengdu high-speed railway and Chongqing–Lanzhou high-speed railway from where they meet at Guangyuan, Sichuan. This will reduce the need for a separate direct Chongqing-Xi'an or Chengdu-Lanzhou line.

Because of hilly terrain between Guangyuan and Lanzhou on 832 km (517 mi) of railway there are 285 bridges totaling 104 km (65 mi) (13% of the route) and 178 tunnels totaling 506 km (314 mi) (63% of the route). Twelve of the tunnels will exceed 10 km (6.2 mi) in length, while the longest tunnel, West Qinling Tunnel, measures 29 km (18 mi).

== Route ==
Lanzhou–Chongqing railway runs west out of Lanzhou City through Yuzhong County, Weiyuan County, Min County, Tanchang County, Longnan City in Gansu. Crossing into Sichuan Province territory, it then travels by Guangyuan, Cangxi County, Langzhong, Nanbu County, Nanchong. Finally it enters Chongqing City via Hechuan District and Beibei District before terminating at Chongqing North railway station.

== History ==
- August 1, 2008, West Qinling Tunnel as the first part of the project is opened for tender and bidding started, marking the start of Lanzhou–Chongqing railway construction.
- July 19, 2014, West Qinling Tunnel construction is completed.
- August 8, 2014, Nanchong East station branch opens with EMU services to Chengdu East
- January 1, 2015, 70.7 km (43.9 mi) of the southern end of the project is opened. This allows for Chongqing to Hechuan EMU services in just 20 minutes.
- December 26, 2015, The southern section of the line, from Chongqing to Guangyuan, Sichuan, opened in December 2015. Initially with only conventional rail services.
- May 15, 2016, High speed EMU services commence with train D5131 running from Chongqing to Guangyuan station in a total of 3 hours 06 minutes. It ran at a maximum speed of up to 200 km/h (124 mph).
- December 26, 2016, The section between Guangyuan, Sichuan and Minxian, Gansu was completed in December 2016. However, due to Minxian's small size and remote location, services will only commence to Longnan.
- September 29, 2017, The section between Minxian, Gansu and Lanzhou, Gansu was completed in September 2017.

== Incidents ==
In October 2011, during the construction of the railway, 21 railway workers were killed when the vehicle they were traveling in overturned in Lintao County, Gansu. Seven other workers were injured.
