= Lanzhou–Zhongchuan Airport intercity railway =

Railway line in China

Overview
- Native name: 兰中城际铁路 兰州至中川机场城际铁路
- Status: Operational
- Owner: CR Lanzhou
- Locale: Lanzhou, Gansu province
- Termini: Lanzhou; Zhongchuanjichangdong
- Stations: 6

Service
- Type: Higher-speed rail Commuter rail
- System: China Railway High-speed
- Operator(s): CR Lanzhou

History
- Opened: September 30, 2015; 9 years ago

Technical
- Line length: 61 km (38 mi)
- Track gauge: 1,435 mm (4 ft 8 1/2 in) standard gauge
- Minimum radius: 3,500 m (11,500 ft)
- Electrification: 25 kV 50 Hz AC (Overhead line)
- Operating speed: 160 km/h (99 mph); 250 km/h (155 mph) (long term)
- Maximum incline: 2.0%

Lanzhou–Zhongchuan Airport intercity railway
- Simplified Chinese: 兰中城际铁路
- Traditional Chinese: 蘭中城際鐵路
Transcriptions
Standard Mandarin
- Hanyu Pinyin: Lán-Zhōng chéngjì tiělù

Full name
- Simplified Chinese: 兰州至中川机场城际铁路
- Traditional Chinese: 蘭州至中川機場城際鐵路
Transcriptions
Standard Mandarin
- Hanyu Pinyin: Lánzhōu zhì Zhōngchuān Jīchǎng chéngjì tiělù

Lanzhou–Zhongchuan Airport intercity railway is a regional higher-speed railway located in Gansu Province, connecting the Lanzhou urban area and Lanzhou Zhongchuan Airport. As Zhongchuan Airport is quite distant from the urban area of Lanzhou, regular ground transport currently takes about an hour to make the journey and taxi journeys are expensive at around 150 to 200RMB, but with little to no time advantage over the airport bus service. Thus a higher-speed rail connection was initiated by the Lanzhou government in order to improve access to the airport, but also to the adjacent Lanzhou New Area special economic zone. The journey to the airport now takes from 30 to 40 minutes at a cost of 18.5RMB for Second Class and 22RMB for First Class.

== Overview ==
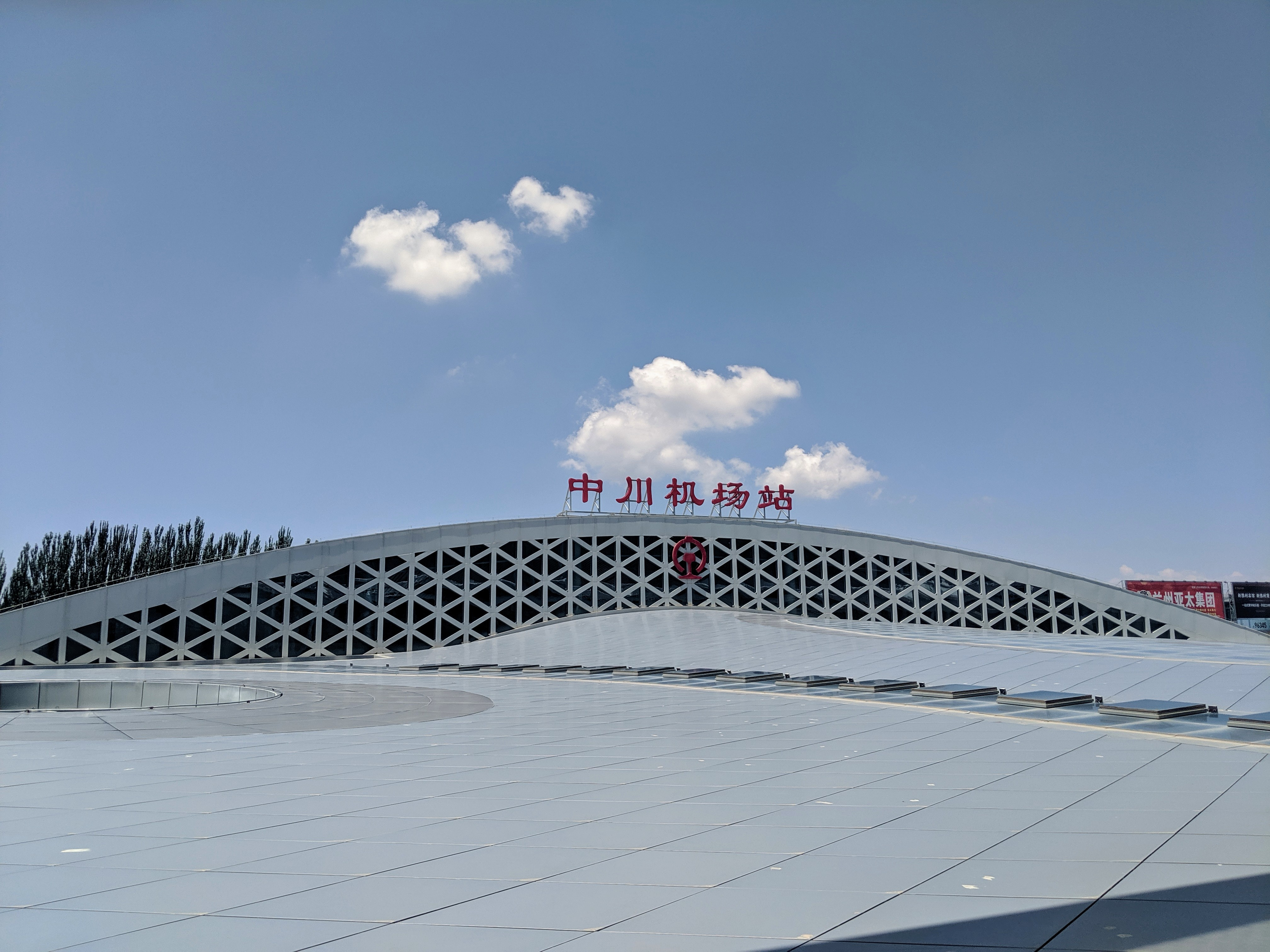
Zhongchuan Airport railway station

The Lanzhou–Zhongchuan Airport intercity railway is proposed to be the first section of a longer Lanzhou–Zhangye intercity railway, connecting western Gansu cities. The Length of the railway is 61 kilometres (38 mi). Starting from Lanzhou West railway station the route parallels the Lanzhou–Xinjiang High-Speed Railway for a short distance. From Fuliqu to Zhongchuanjichang 48.2 kilometres (30.0 mi) of new railway is built as a double tracked electrified line. Total investment was projected to be over 9.1 billion yuan RMB. A total of six stations is constructed, Lanzhou West railway station will allow transfers to Line 1 and Line 2 of Lanzhou Metro, Chenguanying will allow transfers to Line 1 of Lanzhou Metro. Lanzhou Xinqu railway station will allow transfers to future tram and metro services. Before Lanzhou Xinqu railway station, the under construction Zhongwei–Lanzhou high-speed railway branches off.

An initial groundbreaking ceremony was held on December 27, 2010. However works were not actually started. On December 21, 2012, another groundbreaking ceremony was held again with full construction now underway. The line started operation on September 30, 2015, making it the first intercity railway in Western China.

Fuliqu opened on January 8, 2020. Zhongchuanjichang closed on March 20, 2025, and a new station near Terminal 3 (Zhongchuanjichangdong) opened on the same day.

== Stations ==
| Station № | Station Name | Chinese | Distance km | | Metro transfers/connections | Location |
|---|---|---|---|---|---|---|
| LZJ | Lanzhou | 兰州 | 0.00 | 0.00 | | Chengguan |
| LAJ | Lanzhou West (Lanzhouxi) | 兰州西 | 10.00 | 10.00 | 1 2 (planned) | Qilihe |
| CAJ | Chenguanying | 陈官营 | 8.70 | 18.70 | 1 | Xigu |
| FLJ | Fuliqu | 福利区 | 3.00 | 21.70 | | Xigu |
| XIJ | Xigu | 西固 | 2.40 | 24.10 | | Xigu |
| HOJ | Huangyangtou | 黄羊头 | 11.20 | 35.20 | | Gaolan Co. |
| LQJ | Lanzhou Xinqu | 兰州新区 | 31.20 | 66.50 | | Lanzhou New Area |
| ZJJ | Zhongchuan Airport East (Zhongchuanjichangdong) | 中川机场东 | | | | Lanzhou New Area |

== See also ==
- Zhongwei–Lanzhou high-speed railway
