= Lanzhou–Qinghai railway =

Railway line in west China

Overview
- Native name: 兰青铁路
- Status: Operational
- Owner: China Railway
- Locale: Gansu and Qinghai, China
- Termini: Lanzhou; Xining
- Stations: 23

Service
- Type: Heavy rail
- Operator(s): CR Lanzhou, CR Qingzang

Technical
- Line length: 174 km (108 mi)
- Number of tracks: 2
- Track gauge: 1,435 mm (4 ft 8 1/2 in) standard gauge
- Electrification: 25 kV 50 Hz AC (Overhead line)
- Operating speed: 160 km/h (100 mph) (actual operating speed 140 km/h (85 mph))
- Signalling: ABS

The Lanzhou–Qinghai railway (simplified Chinese: 兰青铁路; traditional Chinese: 包蘭鐵路; pinyin: Lánqīng tiělù) is a 174 kilometres (108 mi) railway line that connects the cities of Lanzhou, Gansu on its eastern end to its western terminus of Xining, Qinghai. Construction began May 1959, with chairman Zhu De reportedly writing an inscription to encourage the completion of the railway as fast as possible. The railway officially opened in late 1959 and began operations in February 1960, being the first railway line to connect Gansu and Qinghai, known for their significant minority populations of Tibetans. The line has been considered an important rail link to and from the Tibetan Plateau, connecting to the Qinghai–Tibet railway in Xining, as well as for Northwest China. However, the economic development of the area rendered the railway insufficient to meet increased transportation needs by the 1980s. A project to electrify the line began in the second half of 2006 with 400 million CNY (equivalent to CNY601 million (USD93.2 million) in 2024) of initial investments. Another project to repair and replace rail ties on the 116 km (72 mi) section between Shuichewan and Xining began in March 2025.

== See also ==
- Rail transport in the People's Republic of China
- List of railways in China
