= Line 2 (Lanzhou Metro) =

Metro line in Lanzhou, China

- 2

Overview
- Locale: Lanzhou, Gansu, China
- Termini: Yanbai Bridge; Dongfanghong Square (Phase 1)
- Stations: 9

Service
- Type: Rapid transit
- System: Lanzhou Metro
- Operator(s): Lanzhou Rail Transit Co., Ltd.
- Rolling stock: 6-car Type A

History
- Opened: June 29, 2023

Technical
- Line length: 9.06 km (5.63 mi)
- Number of tracks: 2
- Character: Underground
- Track gauge: 1,435 mm (4 ft 8 1/2 in)
- Operating speed: 80 km/h

Line 2
- Simplified Chinese: 兰州地铁2号线
- Traditional Chinese: 蘭州地鐵2號線
Transcriptions
Standard Mandarin
- Hanyu Pinyin: Lánzhōu Dìtiě Èr Hào Xiàn

Line 2 of the Lanzhou Metro is a subway line in Lanzhou running from Yanbai Bridge to Dongfanghong Square, has 9 stations and is 9.06 kilometres (5.63 mi) long. The Phase 1 entered service on 29 June 2023. An extension is planned to Xiahewan in Anning District.

== History ==
Line 2 was planned to start construction at the end of 2015. Built in phases, the first phase is 9.06 kilometers (5.6 mi) with 9 stations. It will run from Yanbai Bridge to Dongfanghong Square, all within Chengguan District. The line have 2 transfer stations to Line 1, at Wulipu station and Dongfanghong Square station. The line commenced operations on 29 June 2023.

In December 2017, tunnel boring for the second line commenced. The tunnel will be at depths between 6.3 metres (20 ft 8 in) and 16.8 metres (55 ft 1 in).

=== Opening timeline ===
Segment	Status	Length	Station(s)	Note
Yanbai Bridge — Dongfanghong Square	In service	9.06 km (5.63 mi)	9	Phase 1

== Stations ==
Station name		Transfer	Distance km		Location
English	Chinese	Transfer	Distance km		Location
Yanbai Bridge	雁白大桥	3	0.00	0.00	Chengguan
Junjiatan	均家滩				Chengguan
Zhangsutan	张苏滩				Chengguan
Wulipu	五里铺	1			Chengguan
Tuanjie Xincun	团结新村				Chengguan
Hongxingxiang	红星巷				Chengguan
Lanzhou Railway Station	兰州火车站	China Railway			Chengguan
Youdian Dalou	邮电大楼				Chengguan
Dongfanghong Square	东方红广场	1		9.06	Chengguan
