= Yinchuan–Lanzhou high-speed railway =

High-speed railway in China

Overview
- Native name: 银兰客运专线
- Status: Operational
- Owner: China Railway
- Locale: Ningxia and Gansu
- Termini: Yinchuan; Lanzhou West
- Stations: 7

Service
- Type: High-speed rail
- Operator: China Railway Lanzhou Group

Technical
- Line length: 430 km (270 mi)
- Number of tracks: 2 (Double-track)
- Track gauge: 1,435 mm (4 ft 8 1/2 in) standard gauge
- Minimum radius: 800 m (2,600 ft) (Yinchuan–Hedong Airport) 7,000 m (23,000 ft) (Hedong Airport–Wuzhong) 3,500 m (11,500 ft) (Wuzhong–Shuping Section)
- Electrification: 25 kV 50 Hz AC (Overhead line)
- Operating speed: Yinchuan–Yinchuan East: 160 km/h (99 mph) Yinchuan East– Hedong Airport: 220 km/h (140 mph) Hedong Airport to Shuping: 250 km/h (160 mph)
- Signalling: ABS
- Maximum incline: 2.5% (Yinchuan–Wuzhong, Zhongwei South–Shuping); 2% (Wuzhong to Zhongwei South section)
Route map

Yinchuan–Lanzhou high-speed railway is a high-speed railway in China between Lanzhou, the capital of Gansu province, and Zhongwei in Ningxia. It forms part of the Beijing–Lanzhou corridor, part of China's "Eight Vertical and Eight Horizontal" network.

Construction started in 2017 and completed on 29 December 2022. The section between Zhongchuan Airport and Lanzhou West is the already completed Lanzhou-Zhongchuan Airport Intercity Railway. This section will also be shared with the Lanzhou–Zhangye intercity railway.

== History ==
The line was built in two sections. A 207 kilometres (129 mi) section from Yinchuan to Zhongwei, opened on 29 December 2019. The remaining section from Zhongwei to Lanzhou opened on 29 December 2022.
