= New areas =

Government-funded urban districts in China

- Simplified Chinese: 新区
- Traditional Chinese: 新區
- Literal meaning: New Area
Transcriptions
Standard Mandarin
- Hanyu Pinyin: Xīn Qū

The new areas or new districts of the People's Republic of China are new urban districts that are given special economic and development support by the Chinese Central Government or regional government. New areas are divided into two varieties: administrative or management and further divided into levels: state-level, provincial-level, and prefectural-level.

== Types ==
An administrative new area is one in which the territory of the new area and an administrative district coincide, and is either administered simultaneously by the district's governing body or by a joint office under the one institution with two names arrangement.

A management new area is one in which its territory may or may not directly coincide with that of a county level division (i.e. it may includes only parts of county level divisions), and is administered by a management committee dispatched by the municipal government, existing separate from the county level division governments, themselves. A management new area committee is generally responsible for economic development, planning and other related functions, while the county level division governments exercise responsibility over social management and other related functions.

== State-level new areas ==
State-level new areas
- Simplified Chinese: 国家级新区
- Traditional Chinese: 國家級新區
- Literal meaning: State-level new area
Transcriptions
Standard Mandarin
- Hanyu Pinyin: Guójiā-jí xīn qū

Alternative Chinese name
- Simplified Chinese: 国家级开放开发新区
- Traditional Chinese: 國家級開放開發新區
- Literal meaning: State-level open development new area
Transcriptions
Standard Mandarin
- Hanyu Pinyin: Guójiā-jí kāifàng kāifā xīn qū

The State-level new areas of the People's Republic of China are special economic-development zones supported by the central government. The zones are parts of cities at various levels in the formal hierarchy but are known as "national-level" or "state-level" in reference to the preferential policies and privileges that are granted directly by the State Council. These privileges are to encourage and attract new developments (particularly foreign direct investment) to speed up the city's economy.

Division	Hanzi (S) & Pinyin	Designated	Area (km^{2})	Jurisdiction
Pudong New Area (administrative)	浦东新区; Pǔdōng Xīnqū	11 October 1992	1,210	Shanghai (Pudong)
Binhai New Area (administrative)	滨海新区; Bīnhǎi Xīnqū	9 November 2009	2,270	Tianjin (Binhai)
Liangjiang New Area (administrative)	两江新区; Liǎngjiāng Xīnqū	18 June 2010	1,360	Chongqing (Liangjiang)
Zhoushan Archipelago New Area	舟山群岛新区; Zhōushān Qúndǎo Xīnqū	8 July 2011	1,440	Zhoushan (Dinghai, Putuo, Daishan, & Shengsi)
Lanzhou New Area	兰州新区; Lánzhōu Xīnqū	20 August 2012	806	Lanzhou
Nansha New Area	南沙新区; Nánshā Xīnqū	19 September 2012	527	Guangzhou (Nansha)
Xixian New Area	西咸新区; Xīxián Xīnqū	6 January 2014	882	Xi'an & Xianyang parts of Hu, Chang'an, Weiyang, Qindu, Weicheng, Xingping, & Jingyang
Guian New Area	贵安新区; Guì'ān Xīnqū	6 January 2014	1,795	Guiyang & Anshun parts of Huaxi, Qingzhen, Pingba, & Xixiu
West Coast New Area (administrative)	西海岸新区; Xīhǎi'àn Xīnqū	3 June 2014	2,096	Qingdao (Huangdao)
Jinpu New Area	金普新区; Jīnpǔ Xīnqū	23 June 2014	2,299	Dalian parts of Jinzhou & Pulandian
Tianfu New Area	天府新区; Tiānfǔ Xīnqū	2 October 2014	1,578	Chengdu & Meishan parts of Wuhou, Shuangliu, Longquanyi, Jianyang, Xinjin, Pengshan, & Renshou
Xiangjiang New Area	湘江新区; Xiāngjiāng Xīnqū	8 April 2015	490	Changsha parts of Yuelu, Wangcheng, & Ningxiang
Jiangbei New Area	江北新区; Jiāngběi Xīnqū	2 July 2015	806	Nanjing parts of Pukou, Luhe, & Qixia
Fuzhou New Area	福州新区; Fúzhōu Xīnqū	30 August 2015	800	Fuzhou parts of Mawei, Cangshan, Changle, & Fuqing
Dianzhong New Area	滇中新区; Diānzhōng Xīnqū	7 September 2015	482	Kunming, Qujing, Chuxiong, & Yuxi parts of Anning, Songming, Xundian, Lufeng, Malong, & Yimen
Harbin New Area	哈尔滨新区; Hārbīn Xīnqū	22 December 2015	493	Harbin parts of Songbei, Hulan, & Pingfang
Changchun New Area	长春新区; Chángchūn Xīnqū	2 February 2016	499	Changchun parts of Chaoyang, Kuancheng, Erdao, & Jiutai
Ganjiang New Area	赣江新区; Gànjiāng Xīnqū	14 June 2016	465	Nanchang & Jiujiang parts of Qingshanhu, Xinjian, Gongqingcheng, & Yongxiu
Xiong'an New Area	雄安新区; Xióng'ān Xīnqū	1 April 2017	100	Baoding parts of Anxin County, Rongcheng County, & Xiong County

== Provincial-level and prefectural-level new areas ==
Provincial-level and prefectural-level new areas are not governed by the central government rather by the provincial or prefectural government.

- Cangzhou - Bohai New Area
- Fuzhou - Jinshan New Area
- Longyan - New Area
- Nanjing - Jiangbei New Area
- Ningbo - Hangzhou Bay New Area
- Nanping - Wuyi New Area
- Qinghuangdao - Beidaihe New Area
- Suzhou:
  - Suzhou Industrial Park
  - Suzhou New District
- Shenzhen - Dapeng New District
- Tianjin - Tianjin Northern New Area
- Wuxi - Wuxi New Area
- Zhenjiang - Zhenjiang New Area
- Zhongshan - Cuiheng New Area
- Anyang - Anyang New Area
- Ganzhou - Zhangkang New Area
- Kaifeng - Kaifeng New Area
- Luoyang - Luoyang New Area
- Ma'anshan
  - Bingjiang New Area
  - Bowang New Area
  - Xiushan New Area
  - Zhengpugang New Area
- Nanchang - Honggutan New District
- Xinyu - Xinyu New Area
- Zhengzhou
  - Zhengbian New Area
  - Zhengdong New Area
- Dalian
  - Jinzhou New Area
  - Pulandian Bay New Area
- Shenyang
  - Hunnan New District
  - Shenbei New Area
- Chongqing - New North Zone
- Guiyang - Jinyang New Area
- Lhasa - Niu New Area
- Ordos - Kangbashi New Area
- Suining - Hedong New Area
- Xi'an - Qujiang New District

== County-level new areas ==
- Jingmen - Zhanghe New Area (漳河新区)
- Minhe - Chuanyuan New Area (川垣新区)

== Township-level new areas ==
- Shayang County - Binjiang New Area (滨江新区)
- Dawu County, Hubei - High-speed Railway New Area (高铁新区)
- Huainan - Shannan New Area
- Hotan County Economic New Area (和田县经济新区), Hotan County, Hotan Prefecture, Xinjiang
