= Xigu, Lanzhou =

Xigu 西固区
- District
- Nighttime panoramic view of the Lanzhou Petrochemical Refinery

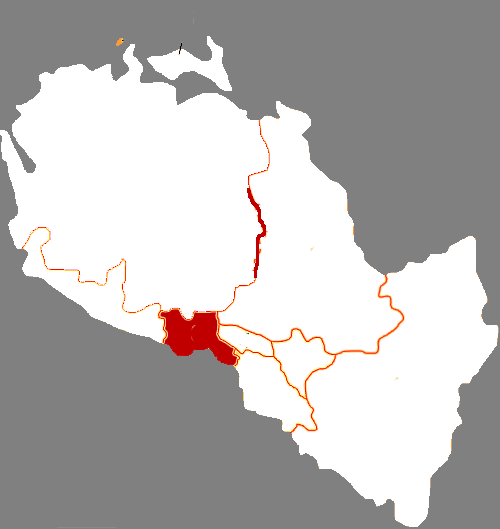
- Xigu in Lanzhou

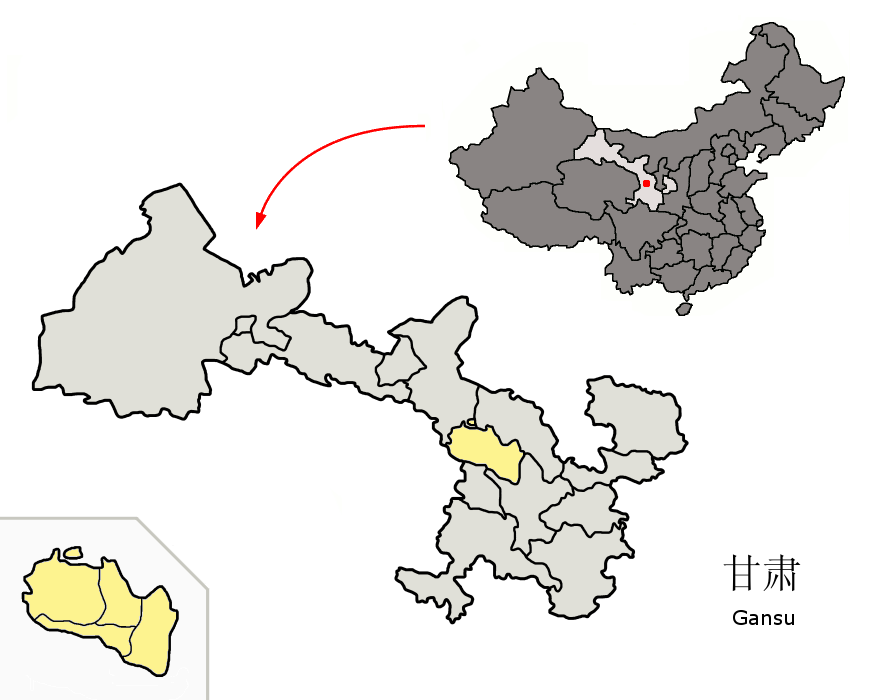
- Lanzhou in Gansu
- Coordinates: 36°05′17″N 103°37′41″E
- Country: China
- Province: Gansu
- Prefecture-level city: Lanzhou
- District seat: Fulilu Subdistrict

Area
  - Total: 385.3 km^{2} (148.8 sq mi)

Population (2012)
  - Total: 325,800
  - Density: 845.6/km^{2} (2,190/sq mi)
- Time zone: UTC+8 (China Standard)
- Postal code: 730060

Xigu District (Chinese: 西固区; pinyin: Xīgù Qū) is one of 5 districts of the prefecture-level city of Lanzhou, the capital of Gansu Province, Northwest China. It is the westernmost part of the city of Lanzhou proper. Until 1952, Xigu was part of Gaolan County as a township and in 1953 it was established as the fifth district-level division of Lanzhou. During this period, as part of China's First Five-Year Plan (1953-1957), the petrochemical industry was developed in the area.

== Administrative divisions ==
Xigu is divided in 7 subdistricts, 5 towns and 1 township:

Subdistricts

- Xiliugou Subdistrict (西柳沟街道)
- Lintaojie Subdistrict (临洮街街道)
- Xigucheng Subdistrict (西固城街道)
- Siqijing Subdistrict (四季青街道)
- Fulilu Subdistrict (福利路街道)
- Chenping Subdistrict (陈坪街道)
- Xianfenglu Subdistrict (先锋路街道)

Towns

- Dachuan (达川镇)
- Hekou (河口镇)
- Xincheng (新城镇)
- Dongchuan (东川镇)
- Liuquan (柳泉镇)

Townships

- Jingou Township (金沟乡)

== Economy ==
A view of the Xigu from the Chaijiatai Yellow River suspension bridge

Xigu District is highly industrialized, and most of Lanzhou's heavy industry is located in the district, including PetroChina's Lanzhou Petrochemical Refinery, an aluminium smelting plant, power plants, and textile industry.

It was also the site of a nuclear enrichment factory, completed in 1958, which provided the nuclear fuel for China's first atomic bomb.

The Bapanxia Dam on the Yellow River is located within the district, at 36°08′15″N 103°24′30″E.

== Transport ==
- China National Highway 109
- China National Highway 213
- G2201 Lanzhou Ring Expressway
- Lanzhou–Zhongchuan Airport intercity railway
- Lanzhou–Xinjiang railway
- Lanzhou Metro Line 1
- Dongchuan Railway Logistics Center, freight train land port with trains to destinations as far as Pakistan and Nepal.

== See also ==
- List of administrative divisions of Gansu
