= Yongdeng County =

Yongdeng County 永登县
- County
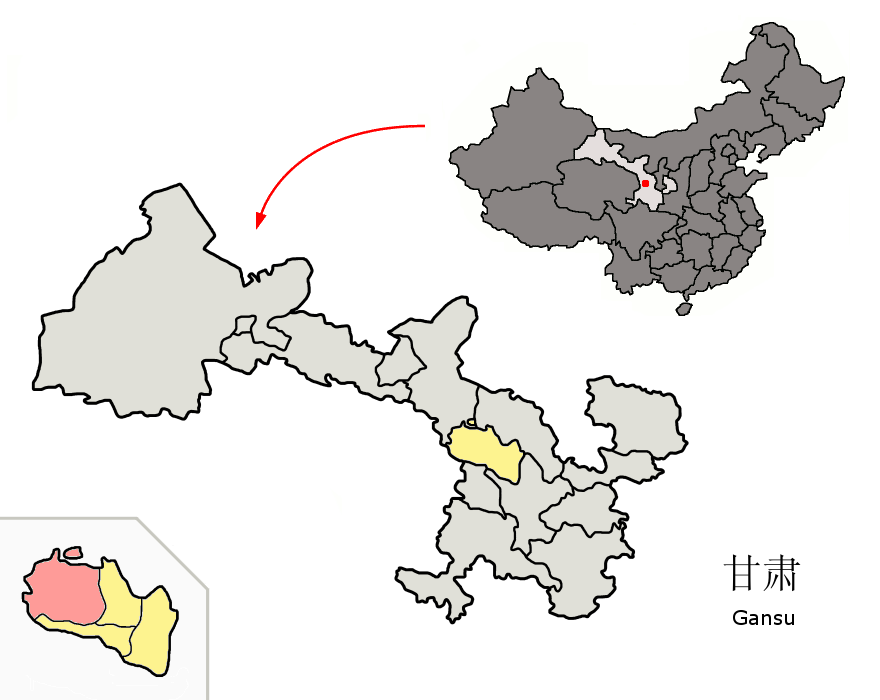
- Location of Yongdeng County (red) in Lanzhou City (yellow) and Gansu

- Location of the seat in Gansu
- Coordinates: 36.983°N 103.433°E
- Country: China
- Province: Gansu
- Prefecture-level city: Lanzhou
- County seat: Chengguan

Area
  - Total: 6,090 km^{2} (2,350 sq mi)
- Highest elevation: 3,650 m (11,980 ft)
- Lowest elevation: 1,590 m (5,220 ft)

Population (2020)
  - Total: 530,000
  - Density: 87/km^{2} (230/sq mi)
- Time zone: UTC+8 (China Standard)
- Postal code: 730300

Yongdeng County (Chinese: 永登县; pinyin: Yǒngdēng Xiàn) is a county of Gansu Province, China, under the administration of the prefecture-level city of Lanzhou, the capital of Gansu. Its postal code is 730300, and its population in 2020 was 520,000 people, of which 454,000 lived in rural communities and 4.5% were minorities.

The county has been inhabited since the Neolithic era, and has been inhabited by the Majiayao culture and Banpo culture.

The economy of Yongdeng County is mainly dependent on agriculture. The Kushui rose, named after Kushui town in Yongdeng, is known throughout China, and is used in a variety of products such as tea, wine, sauce, snacks, candy, cigarettes, soap, perfume and cosmetics. 70% of the national production of this flower originates from Yongdeng County, which led to Yongdeng being known as the 'land of roses'. Other agricultural produce from Yongdeng include grapes, trout, mutton and various vegetables.

== Administrative divisions ==
Yongdeng County is subdivided in 12 towns and 3 townships:

Towns

- Chengguan (城关镇)
- Hongcheng (红城镇)
- Zhongbao (中堡镇)
- Wushengyi (武胜驿镇)
- Heqiao (河桥镇)
- Liancheng (连城镇)
- Kushui (苦水镇)
- Datong (大同镇)
- Longquansi (龙泉寺镇)
- Shuping (树屏镇)
- Liushu (柳树镇)
- Tongyuan (通远镇)

Townships

- Pingcheng (坪城乡)
- Minle (民乐乡)
- Qishan (七山乡)

== Climate ==
Climate data for Yongdeng, elevation 2,119 m (6,952 ft), (1991–2020 normals, extremes 1981–2010)
Month	Jan	Feb	Mar	Apr	May	Jun	Jul	Aug	Sep	Oct	Nov	Dec	Year
Record high °C (°F)	10.8 (51.4)	17.4 (63.3)	24.6 (76.3)	29.0 (84.2)	28.7 (83.7)	30.1 (86.2)	35.7 (96.3)	33.4 (92.1)	28.7 (83.7)	23.6 (74.5)	18.3 (64.9)	13.3 (55.9)	35.7 (96.3)
Mean daily maximum °C (°F)	−0.5 (31.1)	3.5 (38.3)	9.2 (48.6)	15.5 (59.9)	19.5 (67.1)	22.9 (73.2)	25.0 (77.0)	24.0 (75.2)	18.9 (66.0)	13.3 (55.9)	6.7 (44.1)	0.9 (33.6)	13.2 (55.8)
Daily mean °C (°F)	−8.1 (17.4)	−4.0 (24.8)	1.8 (35.2)	8.0 (46.4)	12.5 (54.5)	16.3 (61.3)	18.2 (64.8)	17.3 (63.1)	12.6 (54.7)	6.5 (43.7)	−0.4 (31.3)	−6.5 (20.3)	6.2 (43.1)
Mean daily minimum °C (°F)	−13.3 (8.1)	−9.5 (14.9)	−3.5 (25.7)	1.8 (35.2)	6.2 (43.2)	10.2 (50.4)	12.4 (54.3)	12.0 (53.6)	8.0 (46.4)	1.7 (35.1)	−5.1 (22.8)	−11.4 (11.5)	0.8 (33.4)
Record low °C (°F)	−24.4 (−11.9)	−21.8 (−7.2)	−18.5 (−1.3)	−8.2 (17.2)	−3.9 (25.0)	1.0 (33.8)	4.2 (39.6)	3.4 (38.1)	−1.8 (28.8)	−13.0 (8.6)	−20.3 (−4.5)	−26.5 (−15.7)	−26.5 (−15.7)
Average precipitation mm (inches)	2.4 (0.09)	4.0 (0.16)	7.9 (0.31)	14.4 (0.57)	38.4 (1.51)	46.9 (1.85)	69.8 (2.75)	67.9 (2.67)	55.3 (2.18)	23.9 (0.94)	5.4 (0.21)	1.5 (0.06)	337.8 (13.3)
Average precipitation days (≥ 0.1 mm)	3.5	4.4	5.3	6.8	11.0	12.8	14.3	13.3	14.7	8.9	3.4	2.6	101
Average snowy days	5.9	7.1	8.0	4.0	0.4	0	0	0	0.1	2.6	4.9	4.9	37.9
Average relative humidity (%)	52	50	49	48	52	59	66	67	72	68	61	55	58
Mean monthly sunshine hours	207.9	203.9	219.9	225.6	238.7	231.4	234.2	219.6	180.4	203.6	210.6	212.6	2,588.4
Percentage possible sunshine	67	66	59	57	54	53	53	53	49	59	70	71	59
Source: China Meteorological Administration

== Transport ==
- China National Highway 312
- G30 Lianyungang–Khorgas Expressway
- Lanxin Railway
- Lanzhou-Zhongchuan Airport Intercity Railway

== See also ==
- List of administrative divisions of Gansu
