= China Railway Lanzhou Group =

Chinese railway operator

China Railway Lanzhou Group Co., Ltd.
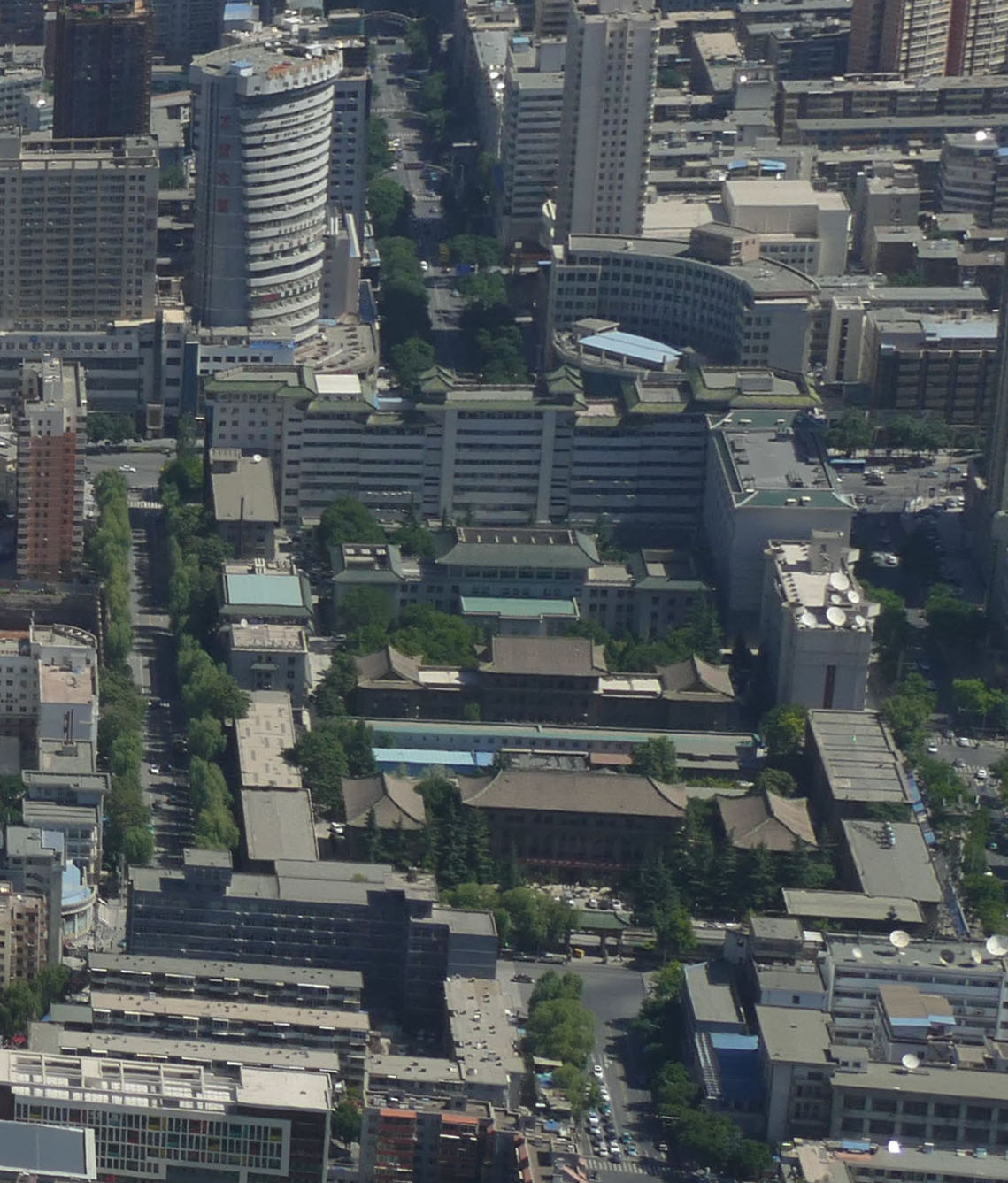
- Headquarters
- Company type: state-owned enterprise
- Industry: Railway operations
- Predecessor: Lanzhou Railway Administration
- Founded: 19 November 2017
- Headquarters: 72 Hezheng Road, Chengguan, Lanzhou, Gansu, China
- Area served: eastern Gansu; Ningxia western Inner Mongolia
- Owner: Government of China
- Parent: China Railway
- Website: Official Weibo Website

China Railway Lanzhou Group
- Simplified Chinese: 中国铁路兰州局集团
- Traditional Chinese: 中國鐵路蘭州局集團
Transcriptions
Standard Mandarin
- Hanyu Pinyin: Zhōngguó Tiělù Lánzhōu Jú Jítuán

Lanzhou Railway Administration
- Simplified Chinese: 兰州铁路局
- Traditional Chinese: 蘭州鐵路局
Transcriptions
Standard Mandarin
- Hanyu Pinyin: Lánzhōu Tiělù Jú

CR Lanzhou
- Simplified Chinese: 兰铁
- Traditional Chinese: 蘭鐵
Transcriptions
Standard Mandarin
- Hanyu Pinyin: Lántiě

China Railway Lanzhou Group, officially abbreviated as CR Lanzhou or CR-Lanzhou, formerly, Lanzhou Railway Administration is a subsidiaries company under the jurisdiction of the China Railway (formerly the Ministry of Railway).

Its origin can be traced back to 1 March 1956 when the Lanzhou Railway Bureau was established. The railway administration was reorganized as a company in November 2017.

It supervises the railway network within eastern Gansu, Ningxia, and western Inner Mongolia. In 2015 it operated 8,543 km (5,308 mi) of railways, including 6,569 km (4,082 mi) of mainline track.

== Hub stations ==
- Lanzhou
  - Lanzhou, Lanzhou West
- Yinchuan
  - Yinchuan
- Tianshui
  - Tianshui, Tianshui South

== Regional services ==
=== C-train services ===
- Lanzhong
