= Qianxian railway station =

Railway station in Xianyang, Shaanxi

Qianxian 乾县

General information
- Location: Qian County, Xianyang, Shaanxi; China
- Coordinates: 34.506226°N 108.273193°E
- Lines: Yinchuan–Xi'an high-speed railway; Xi'an–Pingliang railway

History
- Opened: 26 December 2020
Location

Qianxian railway station (Chinese: 乾县站) is a railway station in Qian County, Xianyang, Shaanxi, China. It is an intermediate stop on the Xi'an–Pingliang railway and the Yinchuan–Xi'an high-speed railway.

Passenger service was introduced on 10 April 2015.

Preceding station	China Railway	Following station
Liquan towards Xi'an	Xi'an–Pingliang railway	Yongshou towards Pingliang
Preceding station	China Railway High-speed	Following station
Yongshou West towards Yinchuan	Yinchuan–Xi'an high-speed railway	Liquan South towards Xi'an North
