= Liquan South railway station =

Railway station in Xianyang, Shaanxi, China

Liquan South 礼泉南

General information
- Location: Liquan County, Xianyang, Shaanxi; China
- Coordinates: 34°27′44.8″N 108°24′10.29″E
- Line: Yinchuan–Xi'an high-speed railway

History
- Opened: 26 December 2020
Location

Liquan South railway station (Chinese: 礼泉南站) is a railway station in Liquan County, Xianyang, Shaanxi, China. It is an intermediate stop on the Yinchuan–Xi'an high-speed railway and was opened with the line on 26 December 2020.

Immediately to the east of this station, there is a spur allowing trains to join the Xi'an–Pingliang railway.

== See also ==
- Liquan railway station

Preceding station	China Railway High-speed	Following station
Qianxian towards Yinchuan	Yinchuan–Xi'an high-speed railway	Xianyang North towards Xi'an North
