= Qian County =

Qian County 乾县
- County
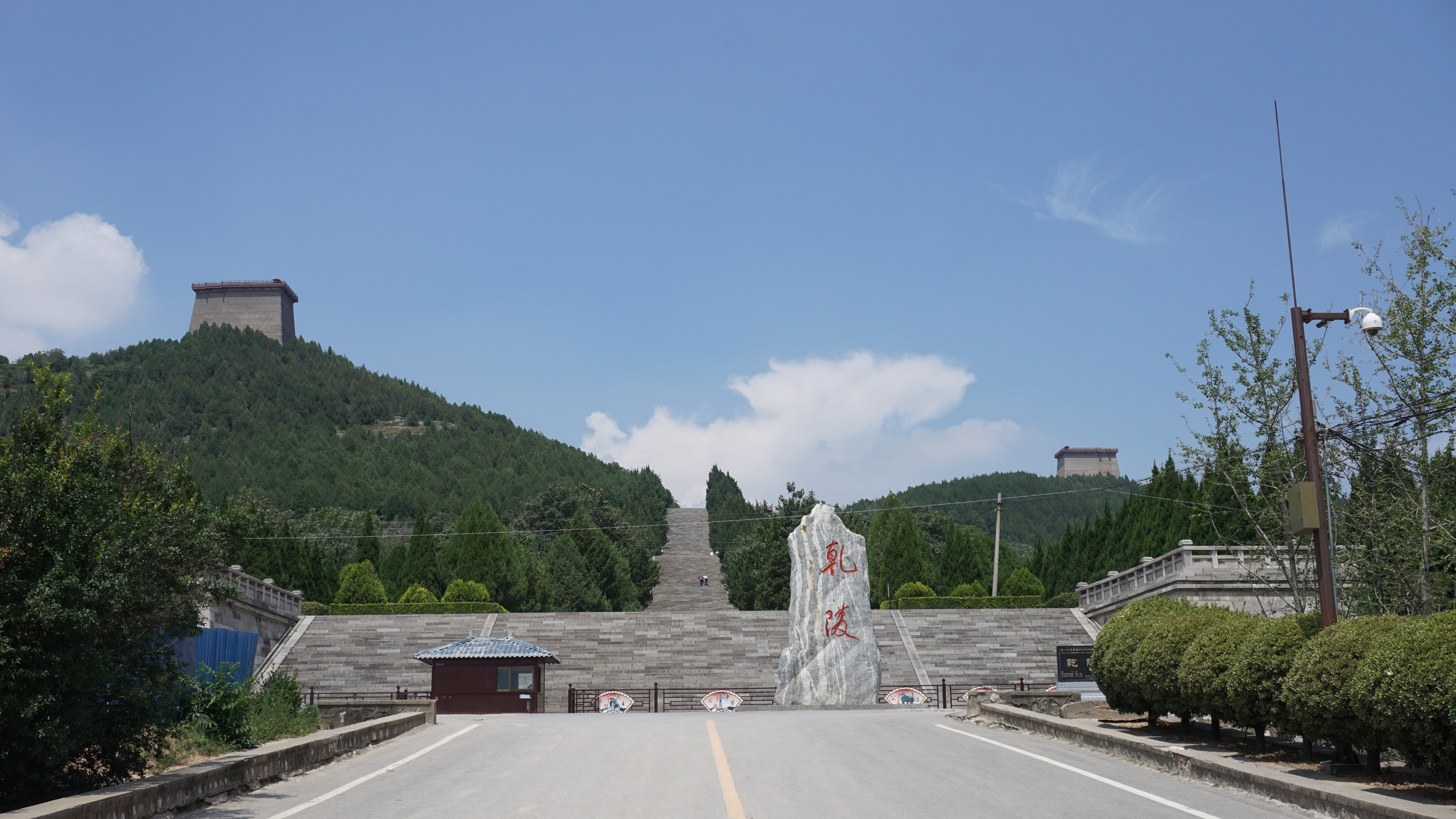
- Qianling Mausoleum complex

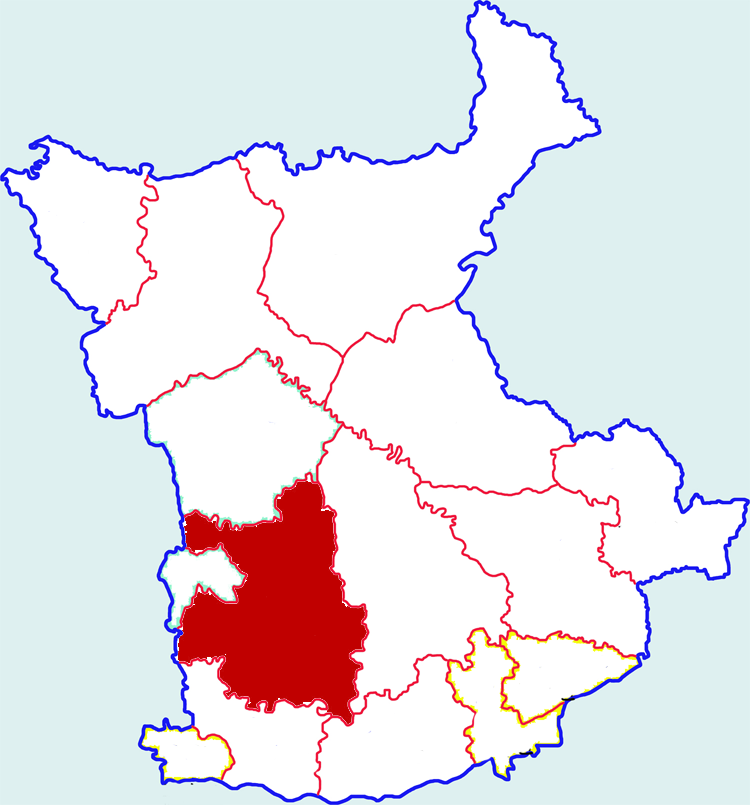
- Qian County in Xianyang

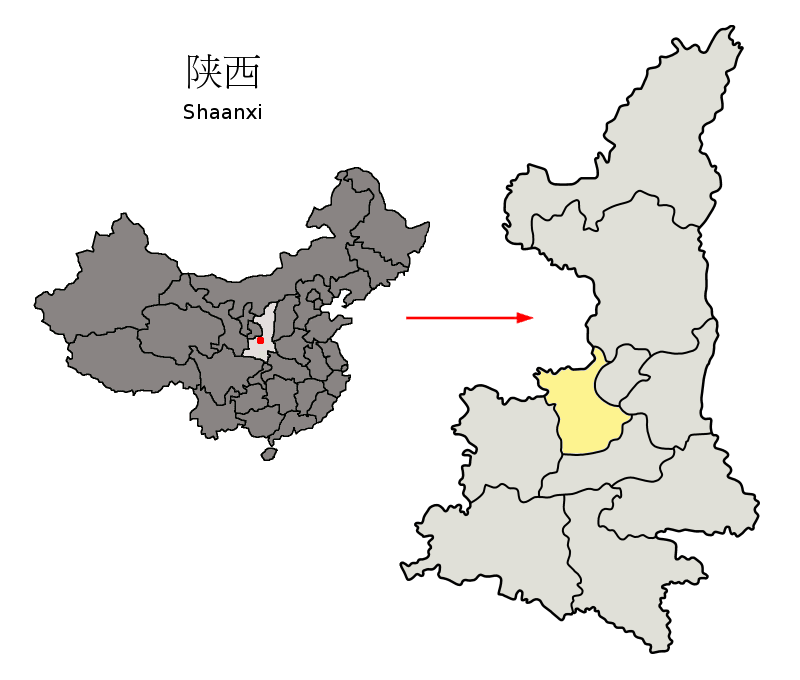
- Xianyang in Shaanxi
- Coordinates (Qian County government): 34°31′39″N 108°14′22″E
- Country: People's Republic of China
- Province: Shaanxi
- Prefecture-level city: Xianyang

Area
  - Total: 1,002.71 km^{2} (387.15 sq mi)

Population (2019)
  - Total: 620,000
  - Density: 620/km^{2} (1,600/sq mi)
- Time zone: UTC+8 (China standard time)
- Postal code: 713300
- Licence plates: 陕D
- Website: www.snqianxian.gov.cn

Qian County
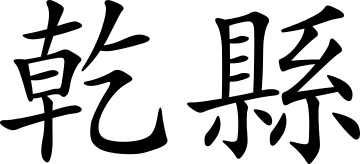
- "Qianxian" in Chinese characters
- Simplified Chinese: 乾县
- Traditional Chinese: 乾縣
Transcriptions
Standard Mandarin
- Hanyu Pinyin: Qián Xiàn

Qian County (乾县; Qián Xiàn) or Qianxian is a county under the administration of the prefecture-level city of Xianyang, in the central part of Shaanxi province, China.

== Administrative divisions ==
Qian County is divided into 1 subdistrict and 15 towns, which are further divided into 173 administrative villages. The county's administrative officers are located in Chengguan Subdistrict.

Administrative Divisions of Qian County
Zoning Code	English name	Hanzi	Pinyin	Administrative Villages
610424001000	Chengguan Subdistrict	城关街道	Chéngguān Jiēdào	28
610424101000	Xuelu Town	薛录镇	Xuēlù Zhèn	14
610424102000	Liangcun Town	梁村镇	Liángcūn Zhèn	13
610424103000	Linping Town	临平镇	Línpíng Zhèn	14
610424104000	Jiangcun Town	姜村镇	Jiāngcūn Zhèn	8
610424105000	Wangcun Town	王村镇	Wángcūn Zhèn	8
610424106000	Malian Town	马连镇	Mǎlián Zhèn	8
610424107000	Yangyu Town	阳峪镇	Yángyù Zhèn	11
610424108000	Fengyang Town	峰阳镇	Fēngyáng Zhèn	7
610424109000	Zhugan Town	注泔镇	Zhùgān Zhèn	9
610424110000	Lingyuan Town	灵源镇	Língyuán Zhèn	7
610424111000	Yanghong Town	阳洪镇	Yánghóng Zhèn	8
610424112000	Liangshan Town	梁山镇	Liángshān Zhèn	10
610424113000	Zhuocheng Town	周城镇	Zhōuchéng Zhèn	7
610424114000	Xinyang Town	新阳镇	Xīnyáng Zhèn	8
610424115000	Dayang Town	大杨镇	Dàyáng Zhèn	13

== Geography ==
The county is bordered by Liquan County to the east, Xingping City and Wugong County to the south, Fufeng County to the west, Yongshou County to the north and west, and Linyou County to the west. The northern portion of Qian County is higher in altitude than the southern portion.

=== Climate ===
Qian County has an average annual precipitation of 539 mm, and an average annual temperature of 12.6 °C.

Climate data for Qianxian, elevation 637 m (2,090 ft), (1991–2020 normals, extremes 1981–2010)
Month	Jan	Feb	Mar	Apr	May	Jun	Jul	Aug	Sep	Oct	Nov	Dec	Year
Record high °C (°F)	16.5 (61.7)	22.9 (73.2)	29.4 (84.9)	34.2 (93.6)	36.6 (97.9)	40.3 (104.5)	39.3 (102.7)	38.3 (100.9)	37.3 (99.1)	30.8 (87.4)	24.6 (76.3)	23.0 (73.4)	40.3 (104.5)
Mean daily maximum °C (°F)	4.8 (40.6)	8.8 (47.8)	14.7 (58.5)	21.2 (70.2)	25.9 (78.6)	30.6 (87.1)	31.8 (89.2)	29.6 (85.3)	24.4 (75.9)	18.7 (65.7)	12.4 (54.3)	6.5 (43.7)	19.1 (66.4)
Daily mean °C (°F)	−0.8 (30.6)	2.9 (37.2)	8.5 (47.3)	14.6 (58.3)	19.7 (67.5)	24.6 (76.3)	26.4 (79.5)	24.6 (76.3)	19.5 (67.1)	13.4 (56.1)	6.6 (43.9)	0.8 (33.4)	13.4 (56.1)
Mean daily minimum °C (°F)	−4.8 (23.4)	−1.4 (29.5)	3.6 (38.5)	8.9 (48.0)	13.6 (56.5)	18.6 (65.5)	21.5 (70.7)	20.4 (68.7)	15.6 (60.1)	9.5 (49.1)	2.3 (36.1)	−3.4 (25.9)	8.7 (47.7)
Record low °C (°F)	−14.3 (6.3)	−11.3 (11.7)	−7.7 (18.1)	−1.8 (28.8)	2.3 (36.1)	8.3 (46.9)	14.1 (57.4)	12.6 (54.7)	6.7 (44.1)	−3.5 (25.7)	−8.5 (16.7)	−15.8 (3.6)	−15.8 (3.6)
Average precipitation mm (inches)	6.8 (0.27)	8.9 (0.35)	21.6 (0.85)	35.3 (1.39)	46.6 (1.83)	61.6 (2.43)	88.3 (3.48)	91.2 (3.59)	90.6 (3.57)	49.2 (1.94)	17.1 (0.67)	4.4 (0.17)	521.6 (20.54)
Average precipitation days (≥ 0.1 mm)	3.9	4.2	6.2	6.7	9.4	8.5	10.0	10.0	11.1	10.0	5.3	2.8	88.1
Average snowy days	4.7	3.8	1.7	0.1	0	0	0	0	0	0	1.4	3.1	14.8
Average relative humidity (%)	59	60	60	62	62	60	68	74	77	75	69	60	66
Mean monthly sunshine hours	147.2	143.1	168.4	191.0	210.4	207.2	214.4	185.7	142.1	136.6	150.8	150.7	2,047.6
Percentage possible sunshine	47	46	45	49	49	48	49	45	39	39	49	50	46
Source: China Meteorological Administration

== History ==
=== Neolithic Age ===
Qianling County's history can be traced as far back as the Neolithic Age, due to two archaeological studies which uncovered the ruins of Neolithic settlements. These digs uncovered a variety of human tools, such as stone axes and pottery. The uncovered village ruins sat at the confluence of two rivers, and exhibited evidence which suggests that these villagers were well-versed in both agriculture and animal husbandry.

=== Tang dynasty ===
The county's name derives from the Tang settlement of Qianzhou [zh], which was established in present-day Qian County in 895 CE.

=== People's Republic of China ===
The county came under control of the People's Republic of China in 1949, and was incorporated as part of the Shaan-Gan-Ning Border Region until its dissolution one year later. The area's jurisdiction would be further altered in 1956, 1959, 1961, 1968, and 1984.

During Mao Zedong's Down to the Countryside Movement, famous director Zhang Yimou was sent to Qian County, where he worked as a farmer and painter.

== Historical monuments ==
A Tang dynasty imperial tomb complex, Qianling Mausoleum is located on Liang Mountain (梁山) in Qian County, 6 km (3.7 mi) away from the county's urban center and 74 km (46 mi)from Xi'an.

== Economy ==
The county recorded a GDP of 17.16 billion Renminbi, a 0.9% increase from the previous year. The average annual disposable income for urban residents was 35,485 Renminbi in 2019, and was 12,114 Renminbi for rural residents, an annual growth of 8.5% and 9.4%, respectively.

=== Agriculture ===
Key crops for the county include wheat, corn, rapeseed, apples, pears, peaches, grapes, and persimmons. Common livestock include pigs, cows, and goats.

=== Industry ===
The county has three major industrial parks, one producing auto parts, another producing textiles, and the other producing food and drug products.

== Culture ==
Qian County's local cuisine has a number of distinct local dishes, such as a unique type of tofu soup, and a type of fried cake.

== Transport ==
A number of highways pass through the county, including China National Highway 312, the G70 Expressway, Shaanxi Provincial Road 107, and Shaanxi Provincial Road 108.

A number of railways, such as the Yinchuan-Xi'an High Speed Railway, the Xi'an-Pingliang Railway [zh], and the Xi'an-Famen Railway pass through the city.
