= Liquan County =

Coordinates: 34°33′36″N 108°28′40″E

Liquan County 礼泉县
- County
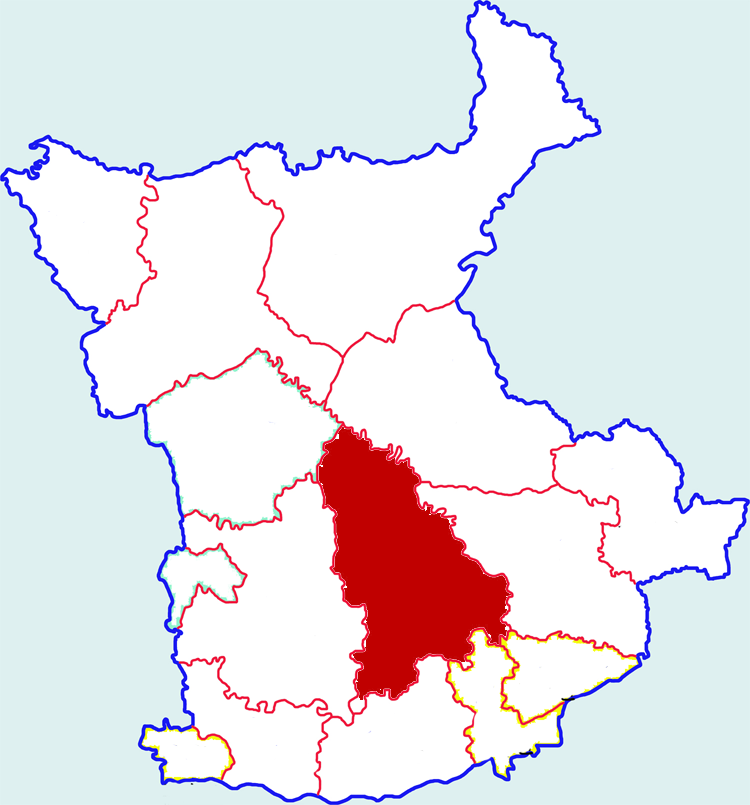
- Liquan in Xianyang

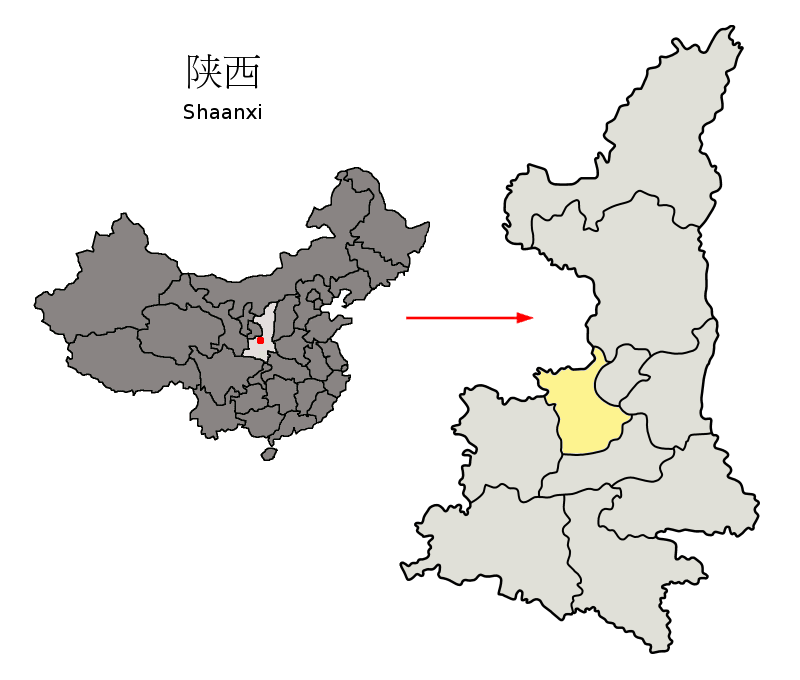
- Xianyang in Shaanxi
- Country: People's Republic of China
- Province: Shaanxi
- Prefecture-level city: Xianyang

Area
  - Total: 1,018 km^{2} (393 sq mi)

Population (2019)
  - Total: 453,770
  - Density: 445.7/km^{2} (1,154/sq mi)
- Time zone: UTC+8 (China standard time)
- Postal Code: 713200
- Website: www.liquan.gov.cn

Liquan County (simplified Chinese: 礼泉县; traditional Chinese: 禮泉縣; pinyin: Lǐquán Xiàn) is a county under the administration of the prefecture-level city of Xianyang, in the central part of Shaanxi province, China. It was known as Liquan (醴泉) County before 1964.

== Administrative divisions ==
As 2016, this County is divided to 12 towns.

Towns

- Chengguan (城关镇)
- Shide (史德镇)
- Xizhangpu (西张堡镇)
- Qiandong (阡东镇)
- Fenghuo (烽火镇)
- Yanxia (烟霞镇)
- Zhao (赵镇)
- Chigan (叱干镇)
- Nanfang (南坊镇)
- Shitan (石潭镇)
- Zhaoling (昭陵镇)
- Junma (骏马镇)

== Climate ==
Climate data for Liquan, elevation 543 m (1,781 ft), (1991–2020 normals, extremes 1981–2010)
Month	Jan	Feb	Mar	Apr	May	Jun	Jul	Aug	Sep	Oct	Nov	Dec	Year
Record high °C (°F)	16.8 (62.2)	23.3 (73.9)	30.4 (86.7)	35.2 (95.4)	36.8 (98.2)	39.5 (103.1)	39.4 (102.9)	38.9 (102.0)	36.8 (98.2)	30.7 (87.3)	24.7 (76.5)	23.6 (74.5)	39.5 (103.1)
Mean daily maximum °C (°F)	—	9.4 (48.9)	15.5 (59.9)	21.9 (71.4)	26.3 (79.3)	30.7 (87.3)	31.9 (89.4)	29.9 (85.8)	24.8 (76.6)	19.0 (66.2)	12.8 (55.0)	6.8 (44.2)	—
Daily mean °C (°F)	−0.7 (30.7)	3.1 (37.6)	9.0 (48.2)	15.0 (59.0)	19.6 (67.3)	24.2 (75.6)	26.3 (79.3)	24.6 (76.3)	19.4 (66.9)	13 (55)	6.2 (43.2)	0.6 (33.1)	13.4 (56.0)
Mean daily minimum °C (°F)	−5.0 (23.0)	−1.4 (29.5)	3.8 (38.8)	8.9 (48.0)	13.5 (56.3)	18.1 (64.6)	21.3 (70.3)	20.4 (68.7)	15.3 (59.5)	8.6 (47.5)	1.6 (34.9)	−3.8 (25.2)	8.4 (47.2)
Record low °C (°F)	−15.5 (4.1)	−12.2 (10.0)	−8.3 (17.1)	−1.7 (28.9)	1.5 (34.7)	8.7 (47.7)	13.4 (56.1)	11.7 (53.1)	5.0 (41.0)	−4.4 (24.1)	−11.0 (12.2)	−20.8 (−5.4)	−20.8 (−5.4)
Average precipitation mm (inches)	6.8 (0.27)	9.3 (0.37)	22.0 (0.87)	34.4 (1.35)	50.7 (2.00)	58.0 (2.28)	88.1 (3.47)	98.7 (3.89)	87.5 (3.44)	52.7 (2.07)	19.5 (0.77)	4.5 (0.18)	532.2 (20.96)
Average precipitation days (≥ 0.1 mm)	3.7	3.9	5.9	6.7	9.0	8.5	9.7	9.5	11.2	9.6	5.5	2.8	86
Average snowy days	4.4	3.2	1.4	0.1	0	0	0	0	0	0	1.4	2.6	13.1
Average relative humidity (%)	61	60	60	64	66	67	74	78	81	81	74	63	69
Mean monthly sunshine hours	140.2	135.2	163.7	193.9	207.9	202.3	217.9	190.8	136.8	126.2	140.5	150.3	2,005.7
Percentage possible sunshine	44	43	44	49	48	47	50	46	37	36	46	49	45
Source: China Meteorological Administration

== Transport ==
The county is served by:

- China National Highway 312
- Liquan railway station on the Xi'an–Pingliang railway
- Liquan South railway station on the Yinchuan–Xi'an high-speed railway
