= Qingyang railway station =

Railway station in Qingyang, Gansu

Qingyang 庆阳
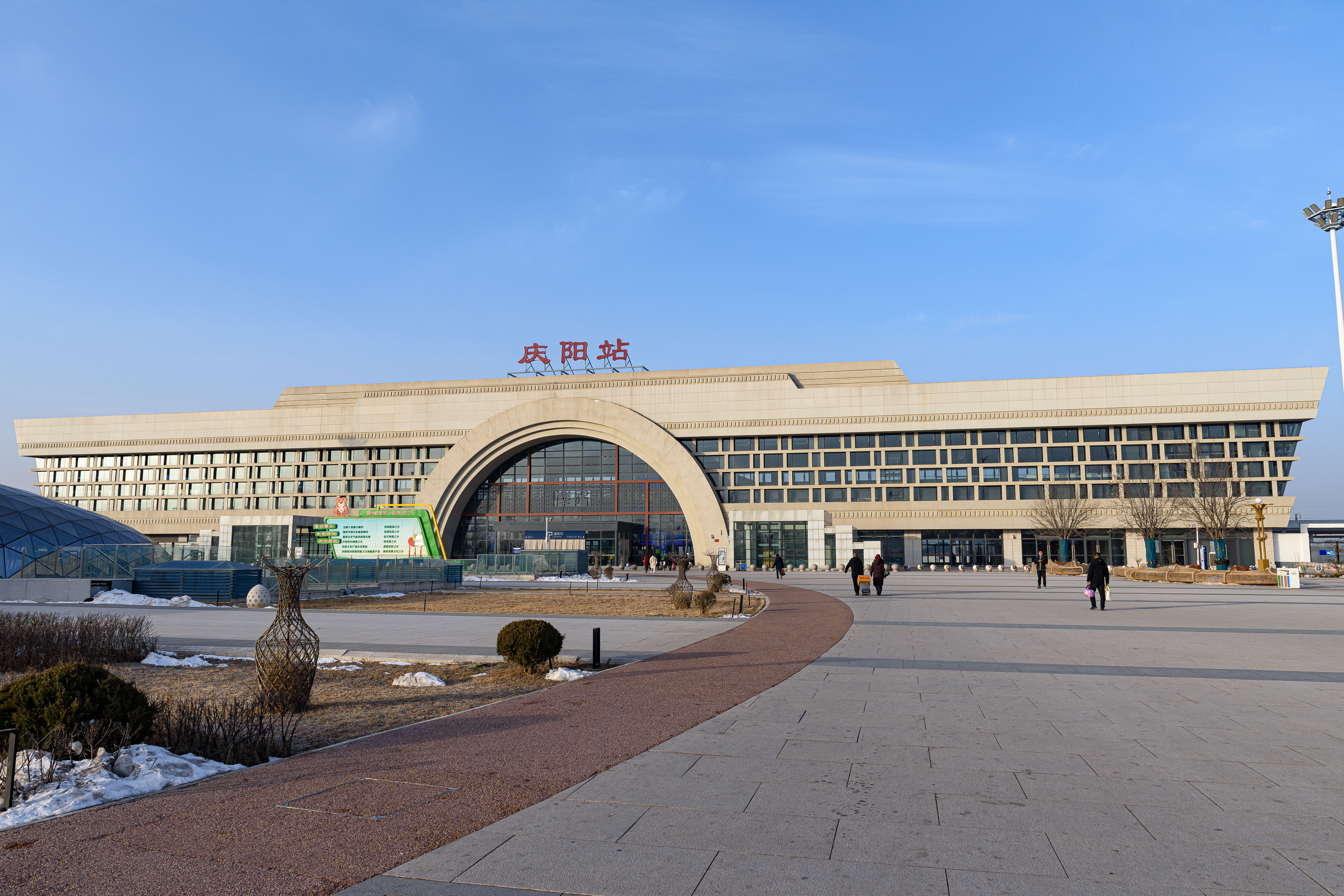

General information
- Location: Xifeng District, Qingyang, Gansu; China
- Coordinates: 35°41′41.45″N 107°37′24.75″E
- Lines: Yinchuan–Xi'an high-speed railway; Pingliang–Qingyang railway (planned)

History
- Opened: 26 December 2020
Location

Qingyang railway station (Chinese: 庆阳站) is a railway station in Xifeng District, Qingyang, Gansu, China. It is an intermediate stop on the Yinchuan–Xi'an high-speed railway and was opened with the line on 26 December 2020.

The main entrance is styled as a yaodong cave, and the interior is decorated with references to wheat ears, paper-cutting and other local folk customs.

It will be the eastern terminus of the planned Pingliang–Qingyang railway.

Preceding station	China Railway High-speed	Following station
Qingcheng (Gansu) towards Yinchuan	Yinchuan–Xi'an high-speed railway	Ningxian towards Xi'an North
