= Xianyang North railway station =

Railway station in Xianyang, Shaanxi

Xianyang North 咸阳北

General information
- Location: Qindu District, Xianyang, Shaanxi; China
- Coordinates: 34°25′13.17″N 108°40′10.7″E
- Line: Yinchuan–Xi'an high-speed railway
- Platforms: 4

History
- Opened: 26 December 2020
Location

Xianyang North railway station (Chinese: 咸阳北站) is a railway station in Qindu District, Xianyang, Shaanxi, China. It is an intermediate stop on the Yinchuan–Xi'an high-speed railway and was opened with the line on 26 December 2020.

The station was initially known as Xianyang Beiyuan (Chinese: 咸阳北塬), but the name was changed prior to opening.

The station has two island platforms.

== See also ==
- Xianyang railway station
- Xianyang West railway station

Preceding station	China Railway High-speed	Following station
Liquan South towards Yinchuan	Yinchuan–Xi'an high-speed railway	Xi'an North Terminus
