= Yongshou County =

Yongshou County 永寿县 Yungshow
- County
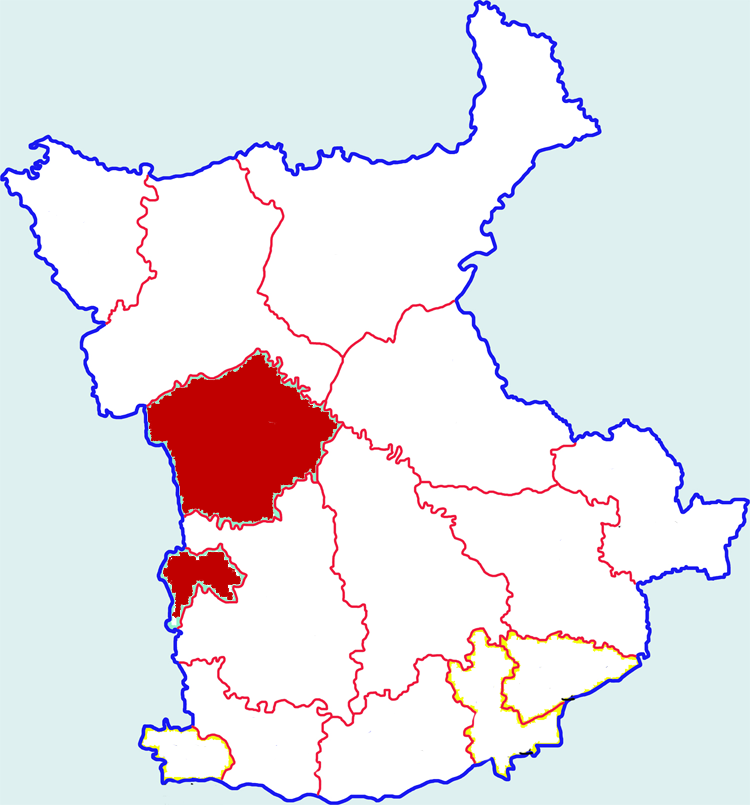
- Yongshou in Xianyang

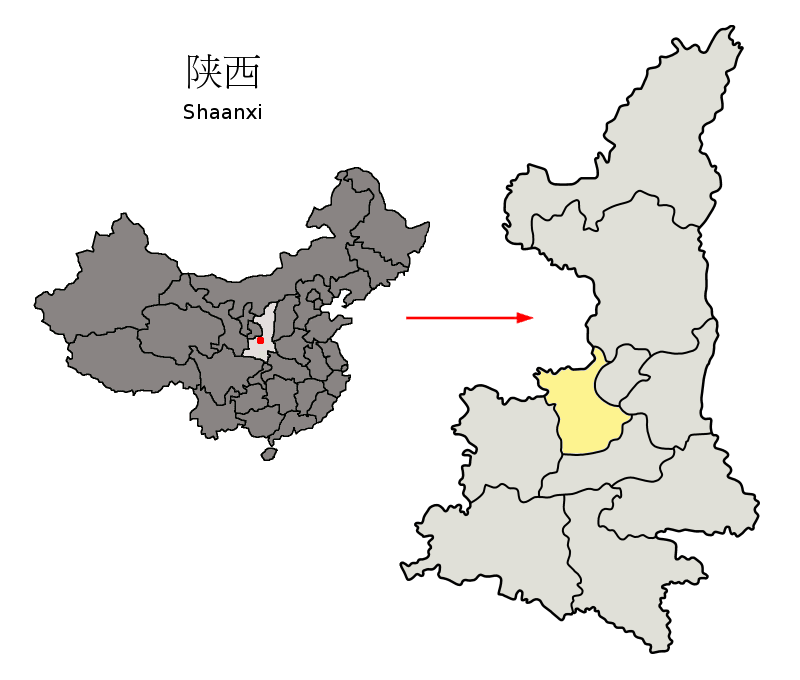
- Xianyang in Shaanxi
- Coordinates: 34°41′31″N 108°08′31″E
- Country: People's Republic of China
- Province: Shaanxi
- Prefecture-level city: Xianyang

Area
  - Total: 889 km^{2} (343 sq mi)

Population (2018)
  - Total: 189,300
  - Density: 213/km^{2} (552/sq mi)
- Time zone: UTC+8 (China standard time)
- Postal code: 713400
- Licence plates: 陕D
- Website: www.yongshou.gov.cn

Yongshou County (simplified Chinese: 永寿县; traditional Chinese: 永壽縣; pinyin: Yǒngshòu Xiàn) is a county under the administration of the prefecture-level city of Xianyang, in the central part of Shaanxi province, China.

== Administrative divisions ==
As of 2016, this county is divided to 11 towns.

Towns

- Jianjun (监军镇)
- Diantou (店头镇)
- Changning (常宁镇)
- Yijing (仪井镇)
- Ganjing (甘井镇)
- Mafang (马坊镇)
- Doujia (豆家镇)
- Yujiagong (御驾宫镇)
- Quzi (渠子镇)
- Yongtai (永太镇)
- Yongping (永平镇)

== Climate ==
Climate data for Yongshou, elevation 995 m (3,264 ft), (1991–2020 normals, extremes 1981–2010)
Month	Jan	Feb	Mar	Apr	May	Jun	Jul	Aug	Sep	Oct	Nov	Dec	Year
Record high °C (°F)	16.7 (62.1)	20.4 (68.7)	27.0 (80.6)	33.4 (92.1)	34.4 (93.9)	37.9 (100.2)	36.7 (98.1)	36.2 (97.2)	36.4 (97.5)	29.0 (84.2)	22.5 (72.5)	20.3 (68.5)	37.9 (100.2)
Mean daily maximum °C (°F)	3.0 (37.4)	6.6 (43.9)	12.5 (54.5)	19.0 (66.2)	23.6 (74.5)	28.0 (82.4)	29.2 (84.6)	27.1 (80.8)	22.1 (71.8)	16.5 (61.7)	10.4 (50.7)	4.7 (40.5)	16.9 (62.4)
Daily mean °C (°F)	−2.0 (28.4)	1.5 (34.7)	7.0 (44.6)	13.2 (55.8)	17.9 (64.2)	22.4 (72.3)	24.2 (75.6)	22.4 (72.3)	17.5 (63.5)	11.5 (52.7)	5.2 (41.4)	−0.3 (31.5)	11.7 (53.1)
Mean daily minimum °C (°F)	−5.6 (21.9)	−2.2 (28.0)	2.7 (36.9)	8.2 (46.8)	12.6 (54.7)	17.1 (62.8)	19.7 (67.5)	18.6 (65.5)	13.9 (57.0)	7.9 (46.2)	1.5 (34.7)	−3.9 (25.0)	7.5 (45.6)
Record low °C (°F)	−15.1 (4.8)	−13.7 (7.3)	−8.8 (16.2)	−2.0 (28.4)	1.5 (34.7)	8.0 (46.4)	12.2 (54.0)	10.6 (51.1)	3.8 (38.8)	−4.7 (23.5)	−11.7 (10.9)	−19.0 (−2.2)	−19.0 (−2.2)
Average precipitation mm (inches)	8.5 (0.33)	10.6 (0.42)	23.8 (0.94)	34.4 (1.35)	50.9 (2.00)	67.7 (2.67)	92.2 (3.63)	99.6 (3.92)	97.1 (3.82)	50.8 (2.00)	18.3 (0.72)	4.9 (0.19)	558.8 (21.99)
Average precipitation days (≥ 0.1 mm)	4.8	5.3	7.2	7.0	9.7	10.1	10.7	11.5	12.1	10.0	6.0	3.6	98
Average snowy days	6.0	5.4	3.1	0.2	0	0	0	0	0	0.1	2.3	4.3	21.4
Average relative humidity (%)	56	58	58	58	59	60	70	76	78	75	66	57	64
Mean monthly sunshine hours	173.6	158.8	188.0	212.7	230.5	222.8	222.6	190.8	146.1	152.2	162.0	176.5	2,236.6
Percentage possible sunshine	55	51	50	54	53	52	51	46	40	44	53	58	51
Source: China Meteorological Administration

== Transport ==
- China National Highway 312
- Yongshou railway station on the Xi'an–Pingliang railway
- Yongshou West railway station on the Yinchuan–Xi'an high-speed railway
