= China Railway NC3 =

Diesel locomotive operated by China Railway from early 1960s to mid-1980s

NC3
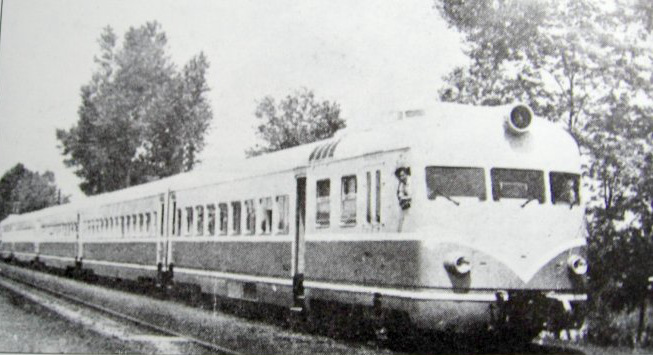
- A NC3 in 1962
- Manufacturer: Ganz-Mavag
- Assembly: Hungary
- Constructed: 1962
- Scrapped: 1987
- Number built: 4 sets
- Operator: China Railways

Specifications
- Train length: 94.82 m (311 ft 1 in)
- Car length: 23.79 m (78 ft 1 in) (motor carriage)
- Width: 3.076 m (10 ft 1.1 in)
- Height: 4,165 m (13,664 ft 8 in)
- Maximum speed: 128 km/h (80 mph)
- Weight: 58,000 kg (127,868 lb)(motor); 44,500 kg (98,106 lb) (trailer)
- Engine type: XII Jv 17/24
- Power output: 500 hp
- Tractive effort: 107 kN
- Transmission: diesel-mechanical
- UIC classification: B′2′+2′2′+2′2′+2′B′
- Braking system: air brake
- Track gauge: 1,435 mm (4 ft 8 1/2 in)

The NC_{3} are a model of diesel multiple units operated by China Railway. They were built by Ganz-MAVAG in 1962 and imported from the Hungarian People's Republic to be operated in China. They were not the first DMU to be operated in China; the Dongfeng DMU had been built a few years earlier, but only in a single set.

== Operational history ==
In 1962, the four sets of NC_{3} diesel multiple units were put into service with Beijing bureau, Beijing internal combustion sector, and ran the tourist services from Beijing to Tianjin. Some flaws that were pointed out during operation were that there were insufficient seats per carriage, and the seats were too close to each other for comfort, the train was too low in height and became too hot in summer. In June 1975, the Ministry of Railways reassigned all four NC_{3} and also the imported Hungarian ND1, to Lanzhou bureau, Lanxi sector. In 1978, one of the NC_{3} was modified into a departmental vehicle, for track inspection and to act as a mobile accident management centre. Afterwards, the remaining cars were disconnected as a multiple unit, and attached to various rescue trains, and they worked in that form until they were withdrawn in 1987.

A few trailer carriages used as storage warehouses survived into the 1990s near Gantang railway station, but by then, the body had significantly degraded and the trains were scrapped sometime later.

== Technical features ==
The NC_{3} diesel multiple unit was designed for short-distance passenger transportation, and was structurally similar to the CSD M 498.0 built for the Cezchoslovak State Railways. Each multiple unit consisted two motor cars and two trailer carriages. The motor cars are numbered from NC_{3}-1 to NC_{3}-8 and can be operated separately from the trailer carriages and can control up to a four motor cars, or two sets. In the motor carriage, the machinery room is located immediately behind the driver's cabin. with the ability to. From the front to the rear of the motor car, the driver's cabin occupies the front, then the machinery room of the motor carriage which contains various piping, water cooling equipment, greasing oils and the diesel fuel, then the luggage stores and water boilers, and finally the passenger cabin. The passenger seats are arranged in a three by two layout, for a total of 78 seats per motor carriage and 118 per trailer carriage for a total capacity of 392 passengers. Located after the passenger cabin are the AV broadcast room, toilets and gangways, while the other motor carriage has a snack bar instead of the AV room.

The NC_{3} uses a diesel-mechanical transmission, which powers the frontal bogie in each motor carriage, with the rear bogie being trailed and supporting the weight of the train. The diesel engine and mechanical transmission are installed directly on the bogie, and extends into the machinery room of the train. Each motor carriage had a non-turbocharged, four-stroke, XII model 12 Jv 17/24 diesel engine, with a cylinder diameter of 170 mm (6.7 in), a piston travel distance of 240 and a maximum of 500 horsepower.

== See also ==
- Ganz Works
- Ganz-MÁVAG
- DVM2
- D1 multiple unit
