= Zhongwei =

Zhongwei 中卫市 · جْووِ شِ
- Prefecture-level city
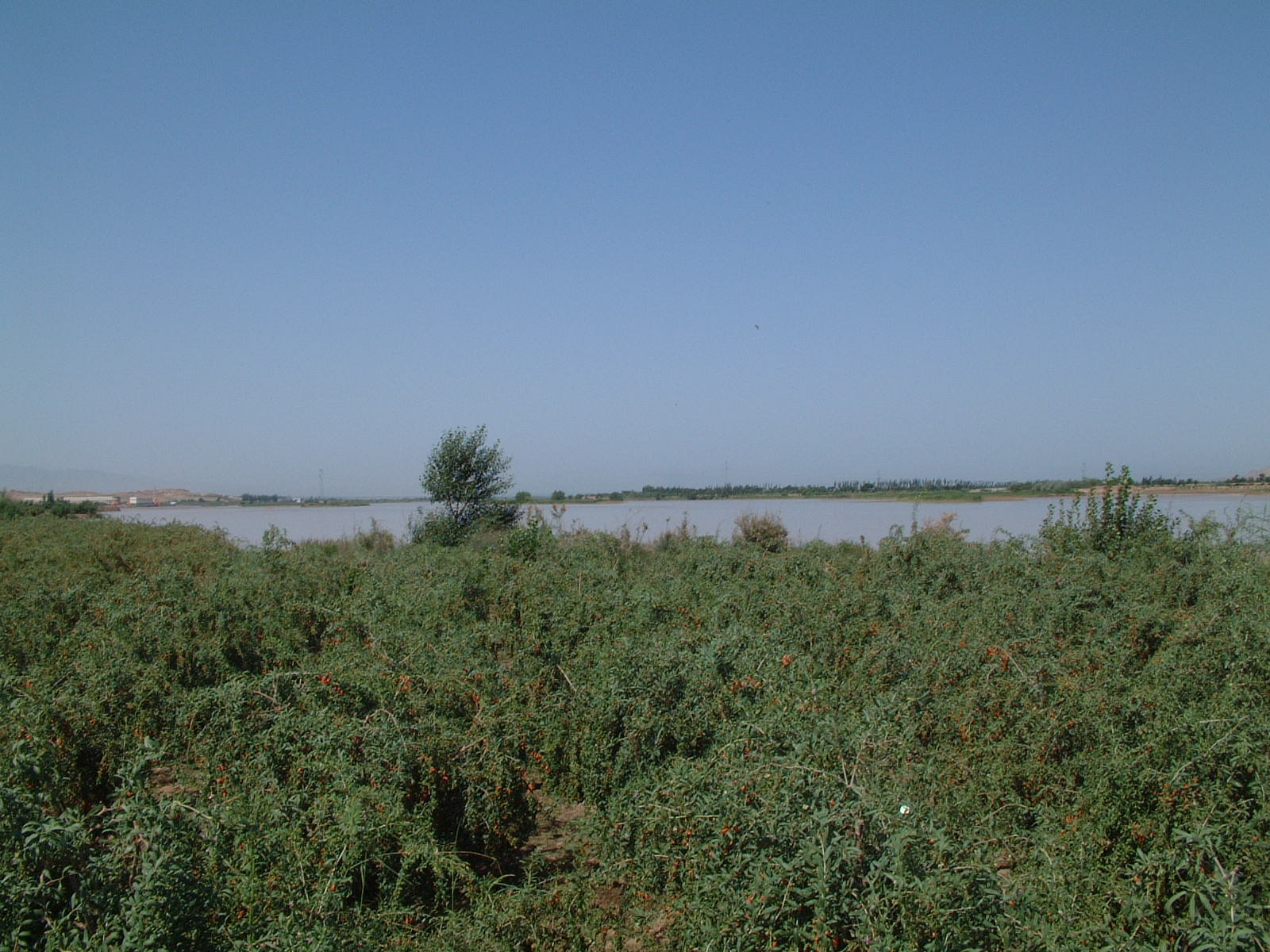
- Wolfberry fields in Zhongning County, Zhongwei City

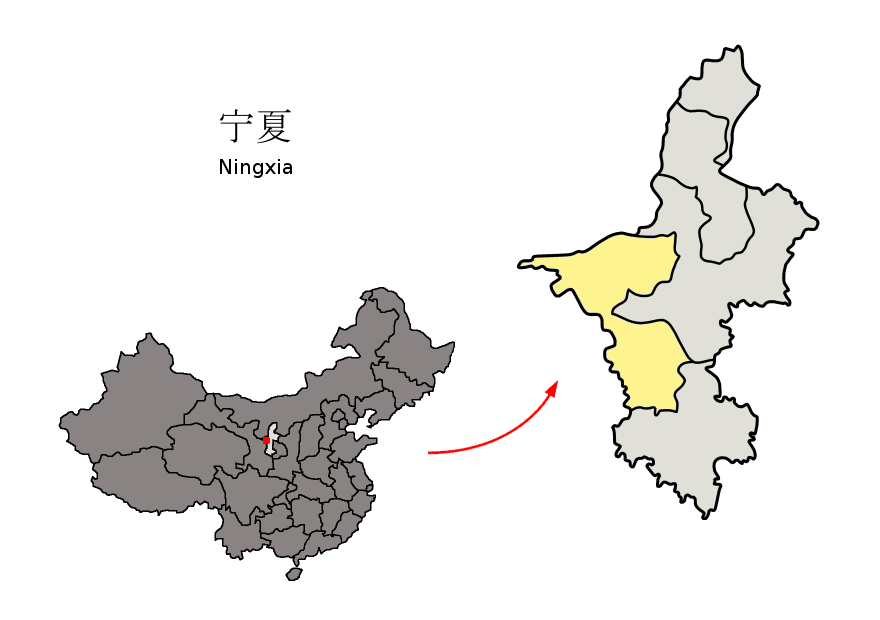
- Zhongwei in Ningxia

- Location of the city centre in Ningxia
- Coordinates (Zhongwei municipal government): 37°30′01″N 105°11′48″E
- Country: People's Republic of China
- Autonomous region: Ningxia
- Municipal seat: Shapotou

Area
  - Prefecture-level city: 16,986.1 km^{2} (6,558.4 sq mi)
- Elevation: 1,225 m (4,019 ft)

Population (2019)
  - Prefecture-level city: 1,174,600
  - Density: 69.151/km^{2} (179.10/sq mi)
  - Urban: 526,500

GDP (nominal) (2025)
  - Prefecture-level city: CN¥ 63.4 billion US$ 8.9 billion
  - Per capita: CN¥ 58,700; US$ 8,218
- Time zone: UTC+8 (China Standard)
- Postal code: 755000
- Area code: 0955
- ISO 3166 code: CN-NX-05
- Website: www.nxzw.gov.cn

Zhongwei (simplified Chinese: 中卫; traditional Chinese: 中衛; pinyin: Zhōngwèi; Wade–Giles: Chung-wei; lit. 'middle guard', Xiao'erjing: جْووِ شِ) is a prefecture-level city of Ningxia, People's Republic of China. It has an area of 16,986.1 km^{2} (6,558.4 sq mi) and a population of 1,174,600 in 2019. By the end of 2024, the city's resident population will be 1,079,800, a decrease of 0.08 million from the end of the previous year, including 570,300 urban residents. The city is known for its wolfberry and Gobi watermelon cultivation. One of the world's largest photovoltaic power stations, Tengger Desert Solar Park, is located in Zhongwei.

== History ==
Under general Meng Tian, the Qin captured the area of Zhongwei and established the Beidi Commandery. In 205 BC a city built at the current location of Zhongwei urban area, which would grow as irrigation systems were built to allow farming.

In 1226 Genghis Khan captured Zhongwei, and in 1403 the city was named Zhongwei, part of Shaanxi.

In 1920 Zhongwei was struck by the Haiyuan earthquake; and in 1926 the highway from Lanzhou to Zhongwei opened.

== Economy ==
As of 2025, Zhongwei had a GDP of CN¥63.338 billion (US$8.867 billion) and a GDP per capita of CN¥58,700 (US$8,218).

== Tourism ==
Zhongwei's main attraction is Gao Miao, a temple that has hosted Confucian, Buddhist, and Taoist ceremonies. A bomb shelter was also built beneath the temple during the Cultural Revolution. It has since been converted into a rendition of a Buddhist hell. The prefecture is also the location of the beginning of the northern bend in the Yellow River that produces the Ordos Loop. A drum tower is located in the city center.

== Administrative divisions ==
Map
Name	Hanzi	Hanyu Pinyin	Xiao'erjing	Population (2019)	Area (km^{2})	Density (/km^{2})
Shapotou District	沙坡头区	Shāpōtóu Qū	شَاپُوَتِوْ ٿِيُوِ	414,200	4,633	89
Zhongning County	中宁县	Zhōngníng Xiàn	جْونِئٍ‌ ثِيًا	351,700	2,841	124
Haiyuan County	海原县	Hǎiyuán Xiàn	خَيْ‌يُوًا ثِيًا	403,900	6,979	58

== Geography ==
Zhongwei is located on the northern banks of the Yellow River and bordered directly by the Tengger Desert in the north. The city has been battling desertification since the 1950s. Using straw checkerboard patterns the advance of sand dunes is stopped.

=== Climate ===
Climate data for Zhongwei, elevation 1,227 m (4,026 ft), (1991–2020 normals, extremes 1981–2010)
Month	Jan	Feb	Mar	Apr	May	Jun	Jul	Aug	Sep	Oct	Nov	Dec	Year
Record high °C (°F)	14.0 (57.2)	22.5 (72.5)	28.2 (82.8)	33.6 (92.5)	36.0 (96.8)	35.4 (95.7)	37.6 (99.7)	36.3 (97.3)	35.7 (96.3)	29.6 (85.3)	22.7 (72.9)	15.2 (59.4)	37.6 (99.7)
Mean daily maximum °C (°F)	1.1 (34.0)	6.4 (43.5)	13.4 (56.1)	20.5 (68.9)	24.8 (76.6)	28.4 (83.1)	29.9 (85.8)	28.2 (82.8)	23.8 (74.8)	18.0 (64.4)	9.8 (49.6)	2.7 (36.9)	17.3 (63.0)
Daily mean °C (°F)	−7.0 (19.4)	−2.1 (28.2)	5.1 (41.2)	12.5 (54.5)	17.5 (63.5)	21.6 (70.9)	23.3 (73.9)	21.5 (70.7)	16.4 (61.5)	9.7 (49.5)	2.2 (36.0)	−4.8 (23.4)	9.7 (49.4)
Mean daily minimum °C (°F)	−13.1 (8.4)	−8.5 (16.7)	−1.5 (29.3)	5.0 (41.0)	10.2 (50.4)	14.8 (58.6)	17.1 (62.8)	15.7 (60.3)	10.6 (51.1)	3.4 (38.1)	−3.0 (26.6)	−10.2 (13.6)	3.4 (38.1)
Record low °C (°F)	−29.1 (−20.4)	−27.1 (−16.8)	−18.5 (−1.3)	−8.7 (16.3)	−3.8 (25.2)	5.4 (41.7)	8.1 (46.6)	7.1 (44.8)	−2.7 (27.1)	−11.4 (11.5)	−15.3 (4.5)	−28.8 (−19.8)	−29.1 (−20.4)
Average precipitation mm (inches)	1.9 (0.07)	1.1 (0.04)	4.2 (0.17)	8.9 (0.35)	17.9 (0.70)	27.0 (1.06)	40.5 (1.59)	43.5 (1.71)	29.2 (1.15)	13.2 (0.52)	2.5 (0.10)	0.6 (0.02)	190.5 (7.48)
Average precipitation days (≥ 0.1 mm)	1.9	1.3	2.1	3.1	4.9	6.0	7.0	7.6	7.2	4.1	1.9	0.8	47.9
Average snowy days	2.9	2.2	1.7	0.6	0.1	0	0	0	0	0.4	1.8	1.5	11.2
Average relative humidity (%)	52	46	42	39	46	54	62	67	68	60	59	55	54
Mean monthly sunshine hours	210.7	214.2	248.0	265.8	295.5	294.5	286.4	267.5	223.9	237.8	219.9	214.4	2,978.6
Percentage possible sunshine	68	69	67	67	67	67	64	64	61	69	73	72	67
Source: China Meteorological Administration

== Transportation ==
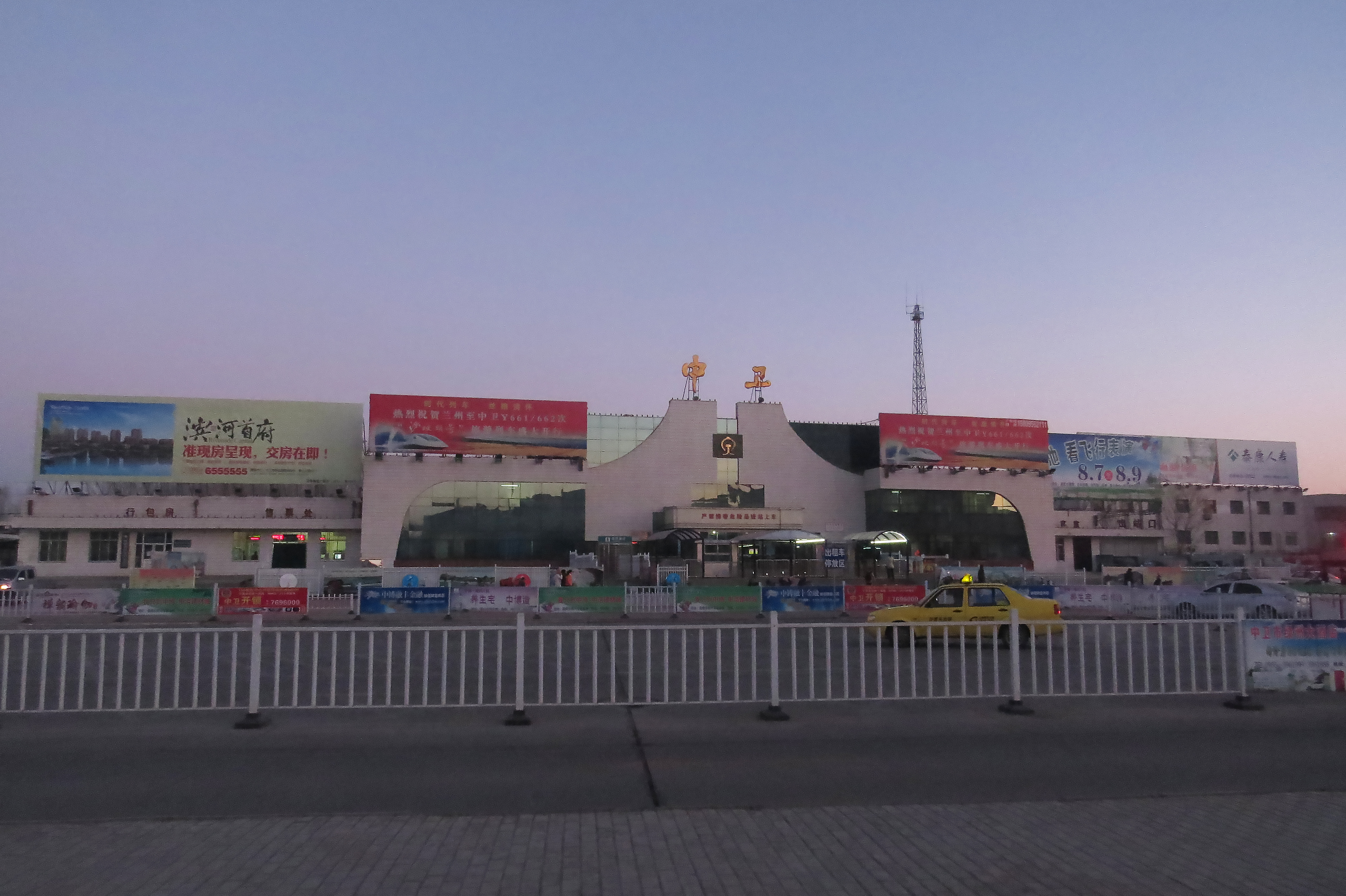
Zhongwei Railway Station in December 2015

- Zhongwei Shapotou Airport
- Baotou–Lanzhou railway
- Baoji–Zhongwei railway, to points south (connections to Xi'an, Chengdu)
- Taiyuan-Zhongwei-Yinchuan railway, to the east (connection to Beijing)
- Gantang–Wuwei railway, to western Gansu and westward
- Zhongwei–Lanzhou high-speed railway
- G70 Fuzhou–Yinchuan Expressway
- G2012 Dingbian–Wuwei Expressway
- China National Highway 109

== Gallery ==
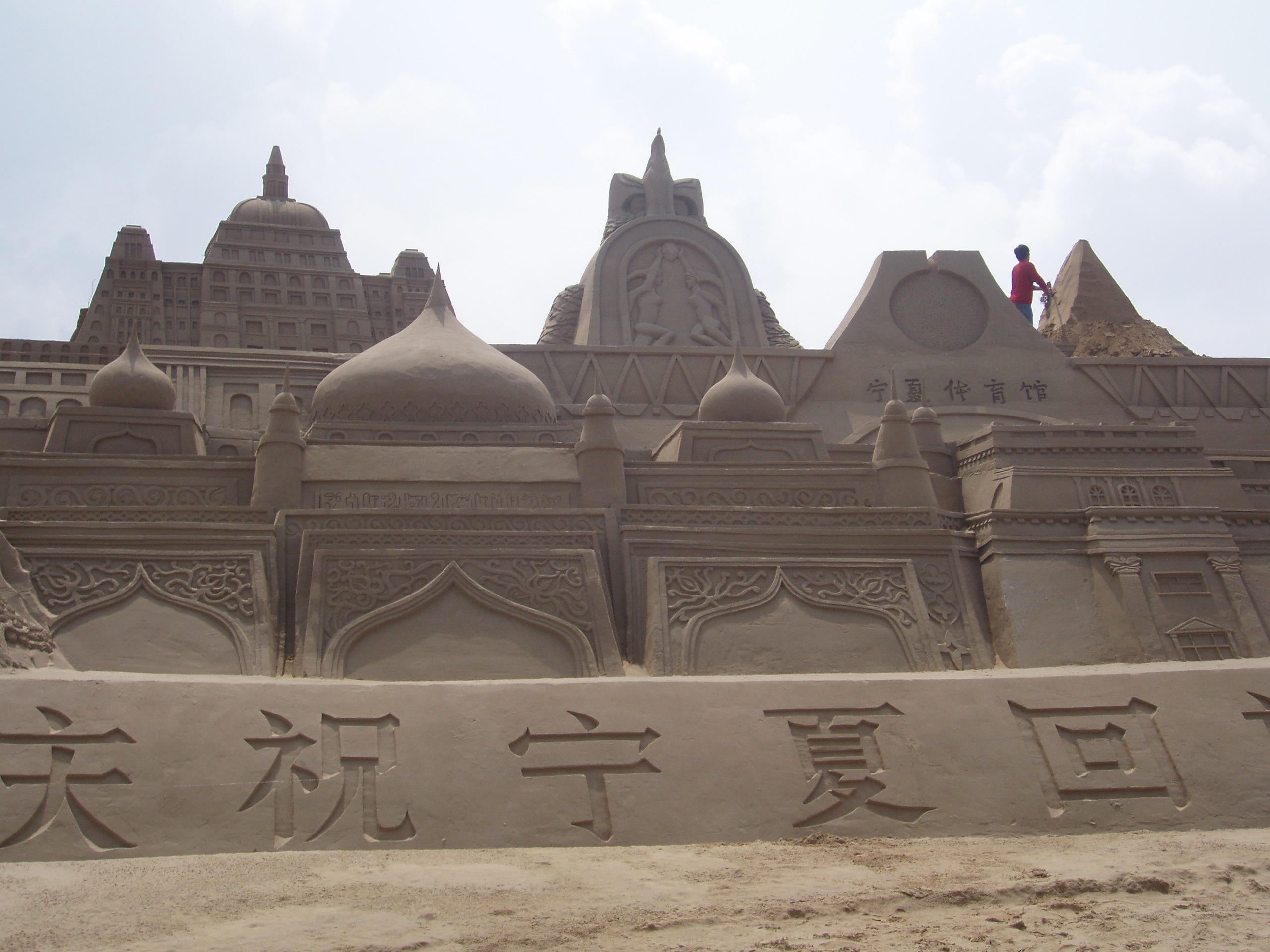
Desert Lake

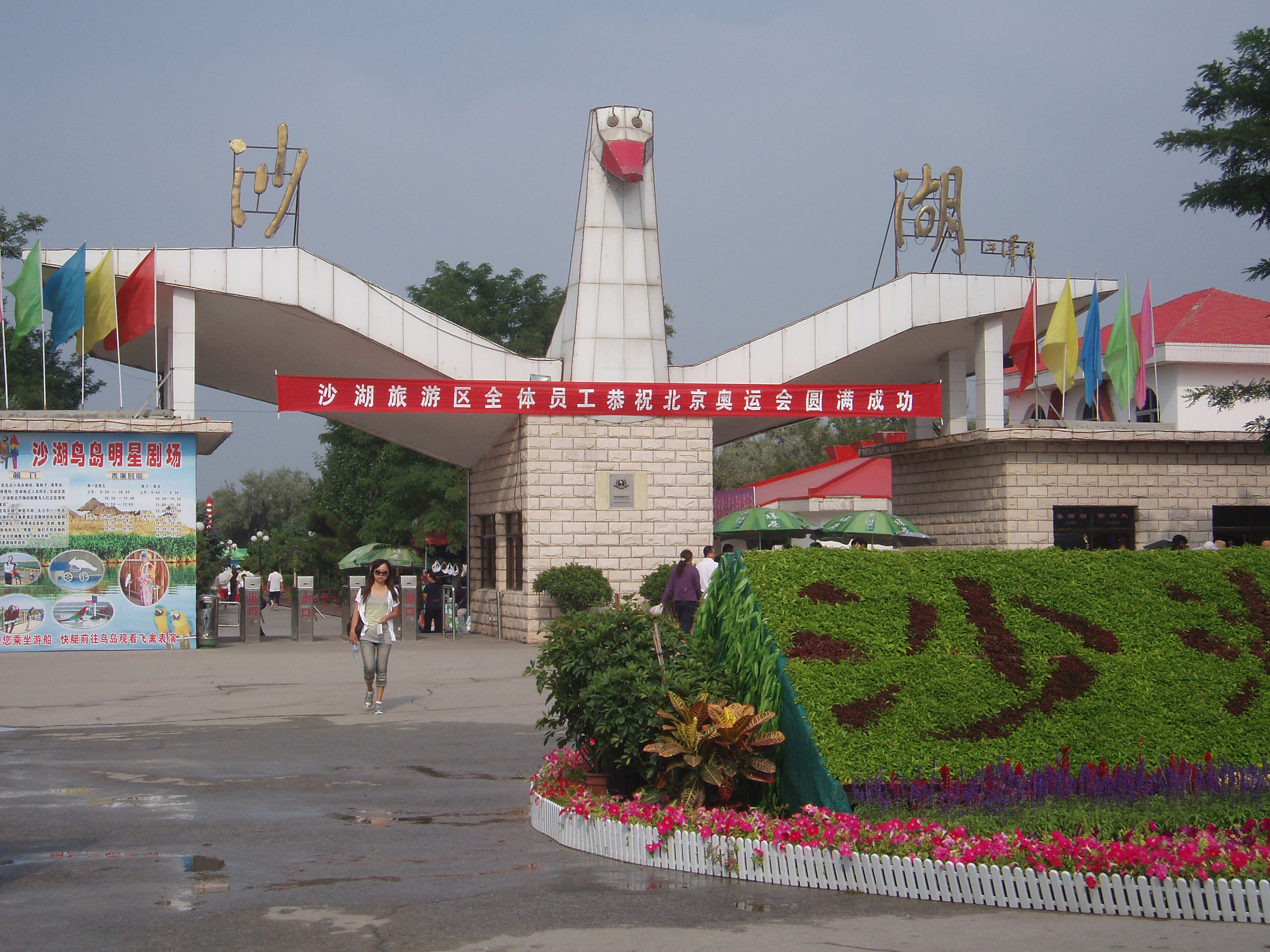
Desert Lake

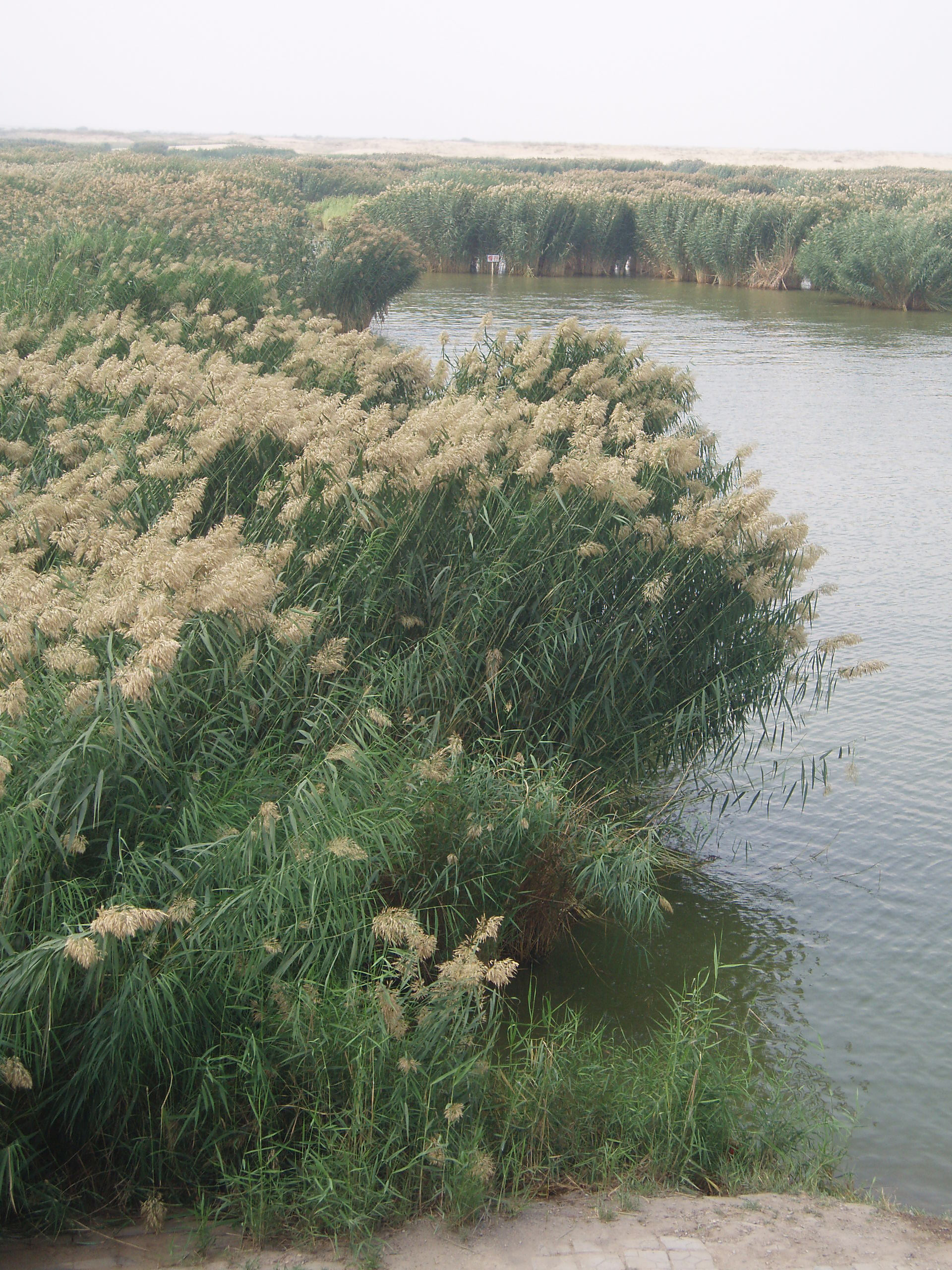
Desert Lake

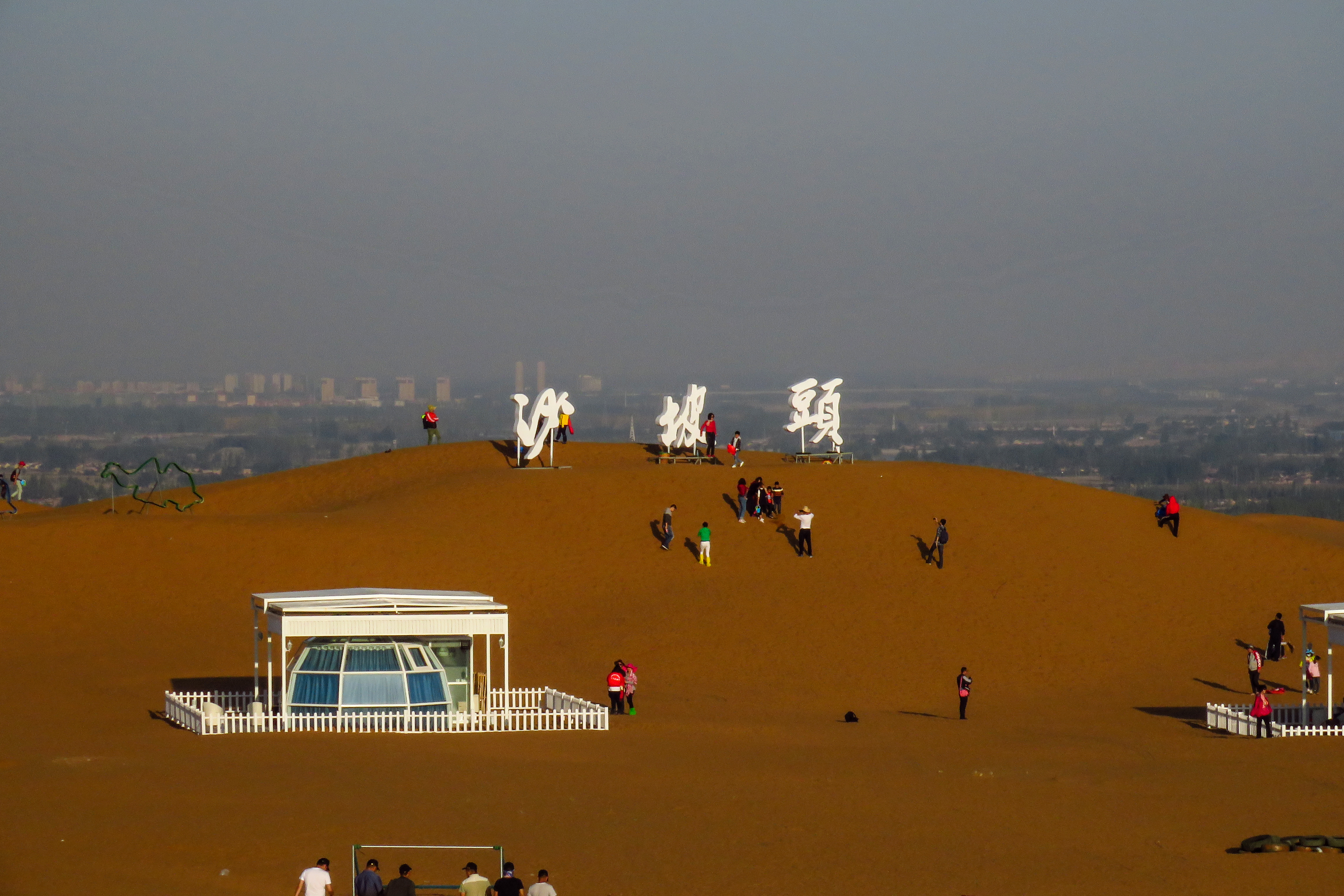
Shapotou scenic area

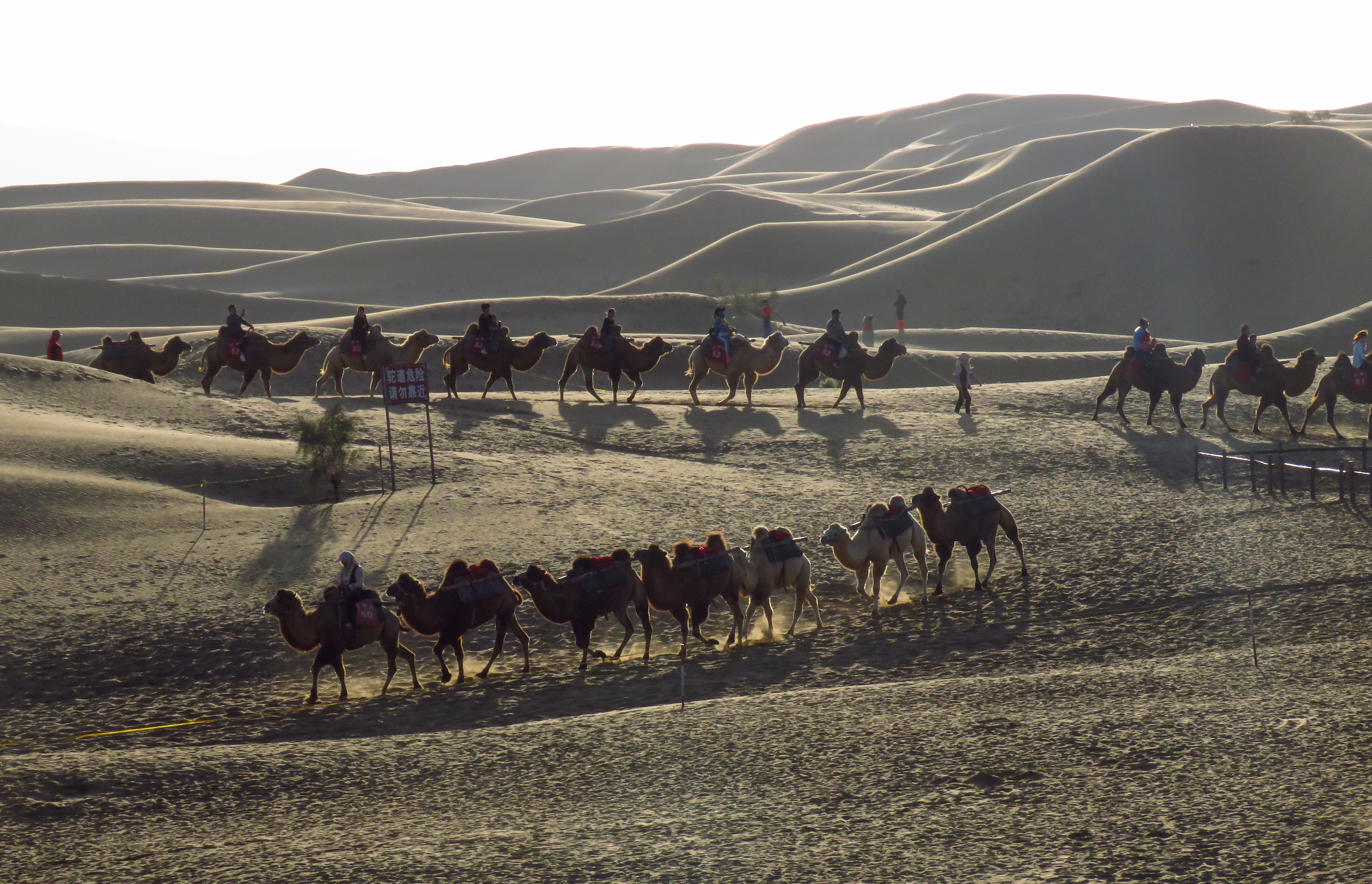
Camels in Shapotou

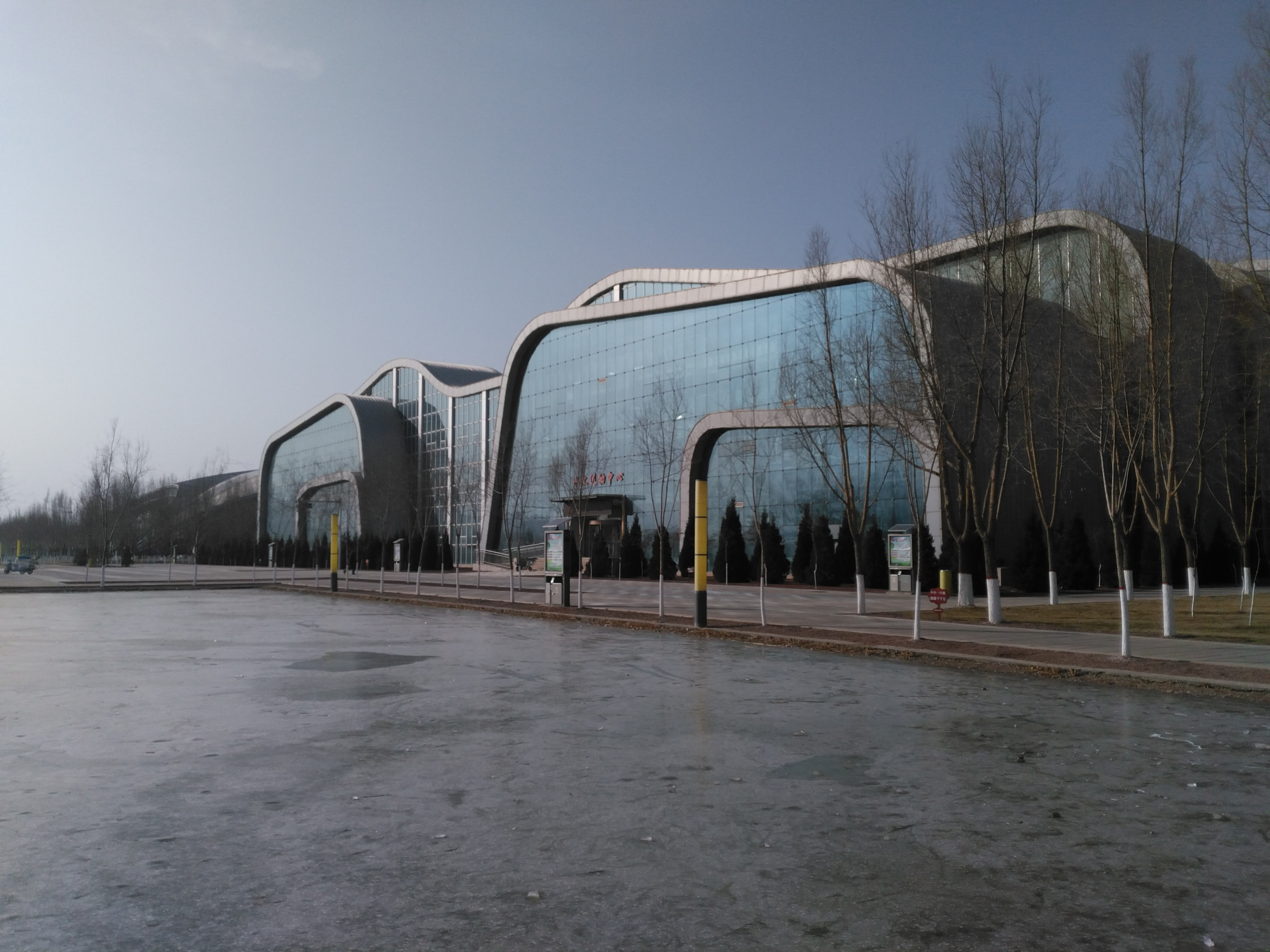
Zhongwei cultural centre

== See also ==
- Zhongwei-Tongxin fault
