= Shapotou, Zhongwei =

Shapotou 沙坡头区 شَاپُوَتِوْ ٿِيُوِ
- County
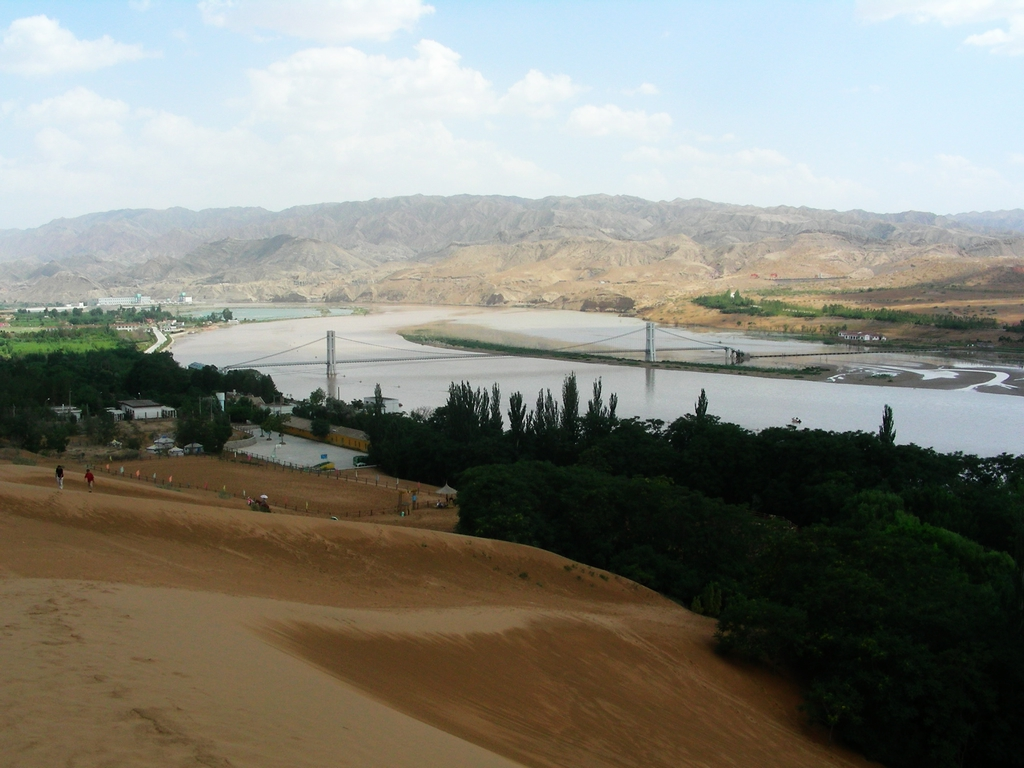
- Shapotou theme park

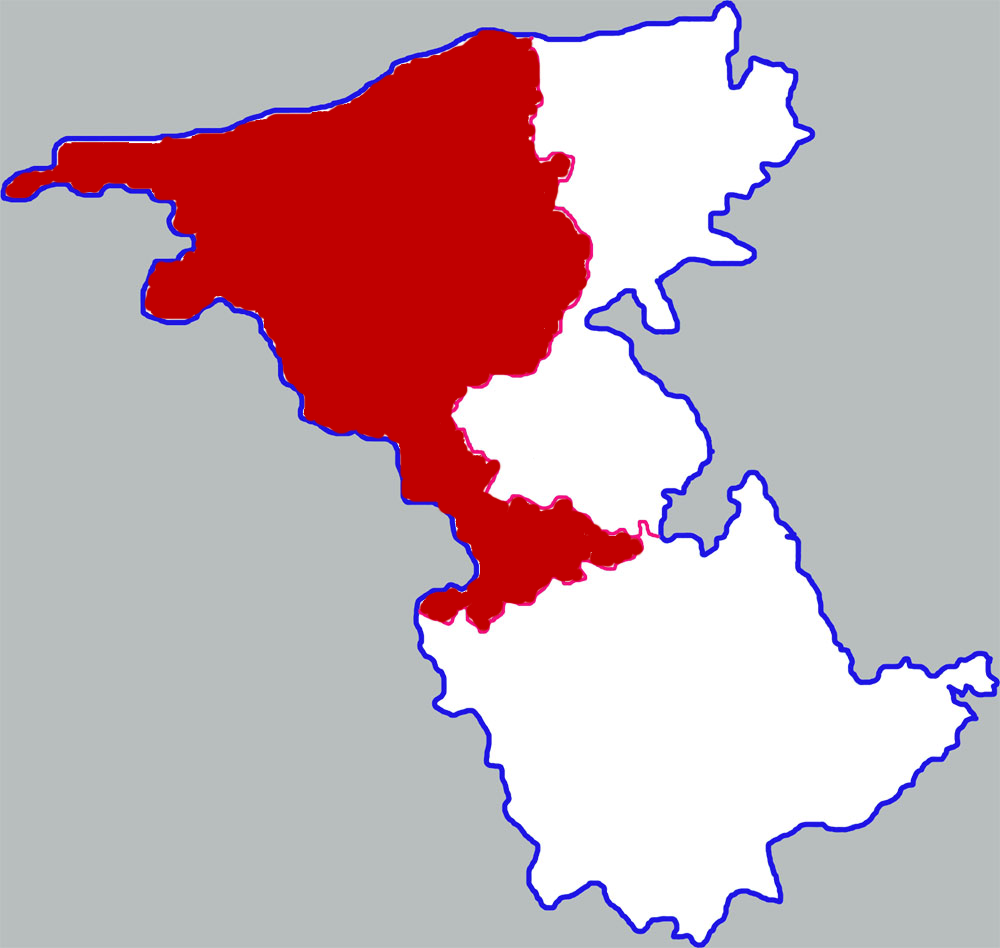
- Shapotou in Zhongwei

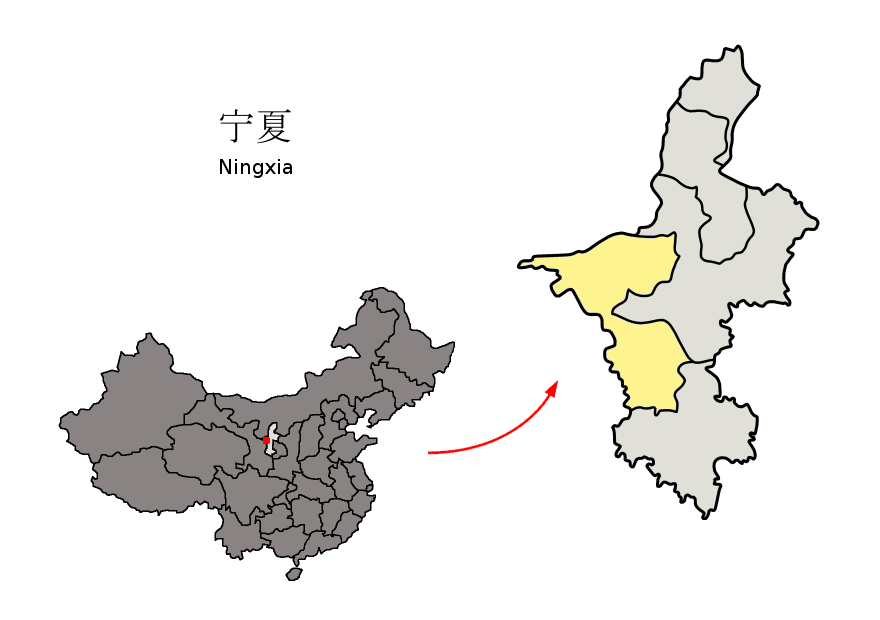
- Zhongwei in Ningxia
- Coordinates: 37°31′01″N 105°10′26″E
- Country: China
- Autonomous region: Ningxia
- Prefecture-level city: Zhongwei
- District seat: Binhe

Area
  - Total: 5,380.42 km^{2} (2,077.39 sq mi)

Population (2020 census)
  - Total: 399,796
  - Density: 74.3057/km^{2} (192.451/sq mi)
- Time zone: UTC+8 (China Standard)
- Website: www.spt.gov.cn

Shapotou District (simplified Chinese: 沙坡头区; traditional Chinese: 沙坡頭區; pinyin: Shāpōtóu Qū, Xiao'erjing: شَاپُوَتِوْ ٿِيُوِ) is a district of Zhongwei, Ningxia, China, noted for the Tengger Desert, and bordering Inner Mongolia to the north and Gansu province to the west.

It is the site of the Shapotou Desert Experimental Research Station. The research station is located at the southern end of the dune sea on the banks of the Yellow River. Research at station includes dune stabilization using grasses and microbial mats. Regions stabilized in the 1950s are now used for fruit and vine crops.

Sand dune stabilization in the region is required to curtail burial of the trans-Asia Baotou–Lanzhou Railway.

== Administrative divisions ==
At present, Shapotou District, has 10 towns and 1 township.

10 towns

- Binhe (滨河镇, بٍ‌حَ جٍ)
- Wenchang (文昌镇, وٌچَانْ جٍ)
- Dongyuan (东园镇, دْويُوًا جٍ)
- Rouyuan (柔远镇, ژِوْيُوًاجٍ)
- Zhenluo (镇罗镇, جٍ‌لُوَ جٍ)
- Xuanhe (宣和镇, حَ جٍ)
- Yongkang (永康镇, يٌ‌کَانْ جٍ)
- Changle (常乐镇, چَانْ‌لَ جٍ)
- Yingshuiqiao (迎水桥镇, يٍ‌شُوِٿِيَوْ جٍ)
- Xingren (兴仁镇, ثٍْ‌ژٍ جٍ)

1 township

- Xiangshan (香山乡, ثِيَانْ‌شًا ثِيَانْ)

== Climate ==
Climate data for Xingrenzhen, Shapotou District, elevation 1,698 m (5,571 ft), (1991–2020 normals)
Month	Jan	Feb	Mar	Apr	May	Jun	Jul	Aug	Sep	Oct	Nov	Dec	Year
Mean daily maximum °C (°F)	0.2 (32.4)	4.6 (40.3)	10.8 (51.4)	17.6 (63.7)	22.5 (72.5)	26.5 (79.7)	28.1 (82.6)	26.5 (79.7)	21.5 (70.7)	15.4 (59.7)	8.6 (47.5)	2.2 (36.0)	15.4 (59.7)
Daily mean °C (°F)	−8.4 (16.9)	−3.7 (25.3)	2.9 (37.2)	10.0 (50.0)	15.5 (59.9)	19.9 (67.8)	21.5 (70.7)	19.9 (67.8)	14.7 (58.5)	7.8 (46.0)	0.1 (32.2)	−6.6 (20.1)	7.8 (46.0)
Mean daily minimum °C (°F)	−14.8 (5.4)	−10.3 (13.5)	−3.7 (25.3)	2.8 (37.0)	8.1 (46.6)	12.9 (55.2)	15.2 (59.4)	14.0 (57.2)	9.1 (48.4)	1.9 (35.4)	−5.8 (21.6)	−12.6 (9.3)	1.4 (34.5)
Average precipitation mm (inches)	2.2 (0.09)	2.4 (0.09)	4.2 (0.17)	11.5 (0.45)	24.4 (0.96)	38.3 (1.51)	49.9 (1.96)	56.3 (2.22)	34.3 (1.35)	16.6 (0.65)	3.0 (0.12)	1.0 (0.04)	244.1 (9.61)
Average precipitation days (≥ 0.1 mm)	2.4	2.4	2.8	4.3	6.3	7.6	9.4	9.6	8.8	5.5	2.2	0.9	62.2
Average snowy days	4.7	3.9	3.6	1.4	0.3	0	0	0	0	1.8	3.2	2.7	21.6
Average relative humidity (%)	52	47	41	38	40	47	56	61	63	59	54	51	51
Mean monthly sunshine hours	222.1	218.0	248.7	260.0	280.9	278.3	276.1	263.1	219.6	235.8	226.9	229.4	2,958.9
Percentage possible sunshine	72	71	67	66	64	64	62	63	60	69	75	77	68
Source: China Meteorological Administration
