= 1st Agricultural Construction Division (People's Republic of China) =

2nd Independent Corps of Northwestern Military Region(1949–50) 1st Independent Division of Ninxia Military District (1950–53) 1st Agricultural Construction Division (1953–56)
- Active: 1949.12 - 1956
- Country: People's Republic of China
- Branch: People's Liberation Army Ground Force
- Type: Division
- Role: Infantry
- Part of: Northwestern Military Region
- Garrison/HQ: Zhongwei, Ningxia

2nd Independent Corps of Northwestern Military Region (Chinese: 西北军区独立第2军) was formed on December 19, 1949 in Zhongwei, Ningxia.

The corps was formed from defected Republic of China Army 81st Corps, the unit of Ningxia Hui clique Ma Hongbin.

The corps was originally composed of 2 divisions, with a total of 4 infantry regiments and a cavalry regiment and 9414 personnel.

In December 1950 the corps was reorganized as 1st Independent Division of Ninxia Military District (Chinese: 宁夏军区独立第1师).

In 1953 the division was reorganized as 1st Agricultural Construction Division (Chinese: 农业建设第1师).

In 1956 the division was demobilized.
