= Yongshou West railway station =

Railway station in Xianyang, Shaanxi

Yongshou West 永寿西

General information
- Location: Yongshou County, Xianyang, Shaanxi; China
- Coordinates: 34°41′48.2″N 108°6′47.61″E
- Line: Yinchuan–Xi'an high-speed railway

History
- Opened: 26 December 2020
Location

Yongshou West railway station (Chinese: 永寿西站) is a railway station in Yongshou County, Xianyang, Shaanxi, China. It is an intermediate stop on the Yinchuan–Xi'an high-speed railway and was opened with the line on 26 December 2020.

Preceding station	China Railway High-speed	Following station
Binzhou East towards Yinchuan	Yinchuan–Xi'an high-speed railway	Qianxian towards Xi'an North
