= Pingliang–Qingyang railway =

Railway line in Gansu, China

Overview
- Native name: 平庆铁路
- Locale: Gansu, China
- Termini: Pingliang South railway Station; Qingyang railway station
- Stations: 5

Service
- Operator(s): China Railway

History
- Commenced: 2024
- Planned opening: 2028

Technical
- Line length: 92 km (57 mi)
- Track gauge: 1,435 mm (4 ft 8 1/2 in)
- Electrification: Overhead catenary
- Operating speed: 160 km/h (99 mph)

The Pingliang–Qingyang railway, also known as the Pingqing railway, is a railway line in Gansu, China. The line will run between the cities of Pingliang and Qingyang in eastern Gansu, totaling 92 km.

Starting from Pingliang South station, the line will run eastwards through Zhenyuan County, ending at Qingyang railway station.

== Background ==
Pingliang and Qingyang are prefecture-level cities in eastern Gansu, bordering each other, with existing railway stations, but no direct connection between them. Pingliang South is a station on the Baoji–Zhongwei railway, which opened in 1995. Qingyang is a station on the Yinchuan–Xi'an high-speed railway, opened in 2020. The new railway will provide a direct connection between the two prefecture level cities, provide Zhenyuan County its first connection to the railway network, and reduce the travel time between Qingyang and Gansu's capital Lanzhou.

== History ==
Construction on the 92 km long railway started on 3 January 2024 and is expected to take 4½ years. Between Pingliang South and Baishui, the railway will share the Baoji–Zhongwei railway, which will be doubled in this section, with a maximum speed of 120 km/h. Between Baishui and Qingyang, an entirely new route will be followed, allowing speeds up to 160 km/h.

The line will be fully electrified and for both passenger and freight use.

An extension from Pingliang to Dingxi is planned.

== Stations ==
- Pingliang south
- Baishui
- Zhenyuan
- Beishiku
- Qingyang
