= Xifeng, Qingyang =

Xifeng 西峰区
- County
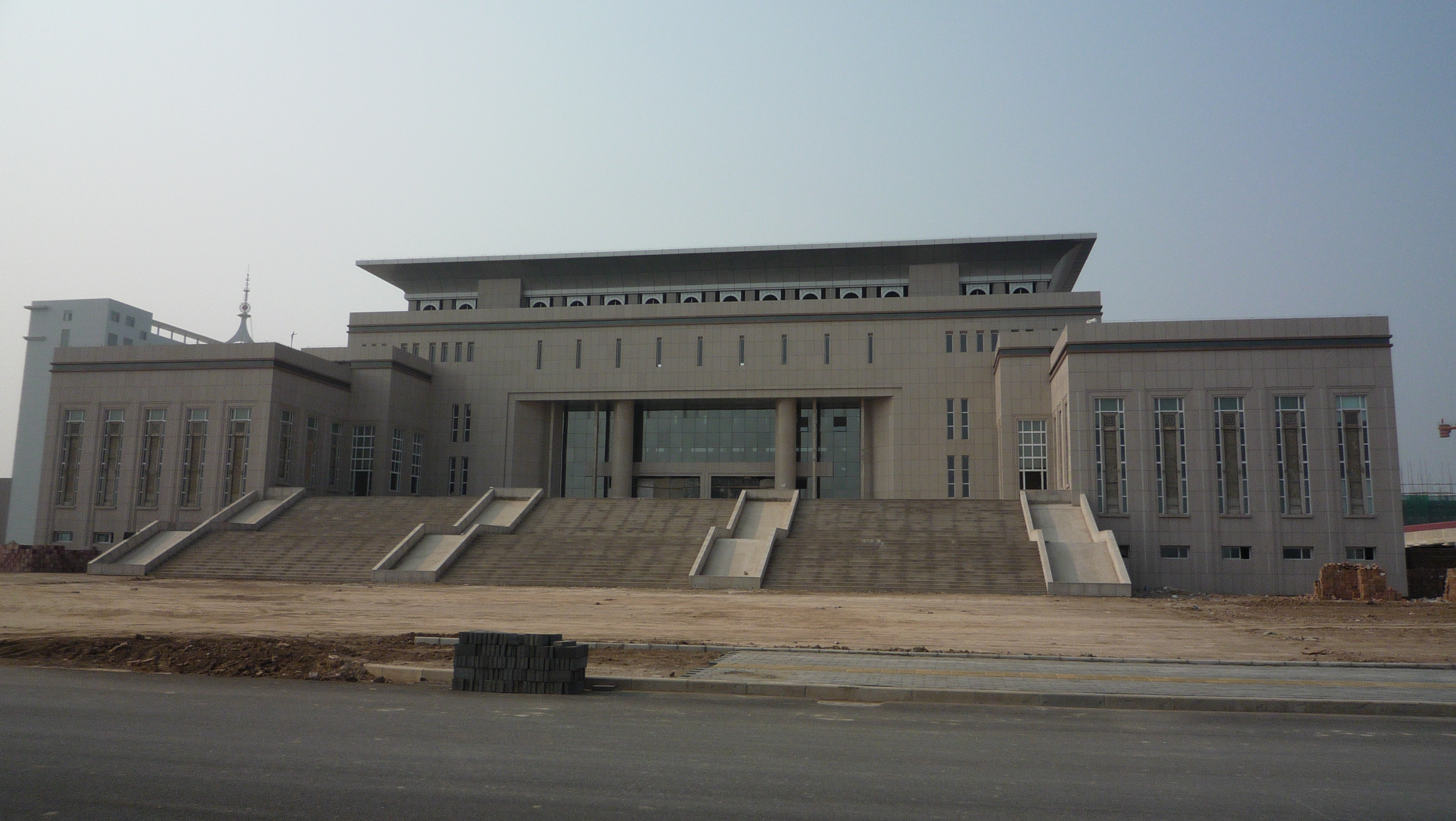
- Qingyang museum

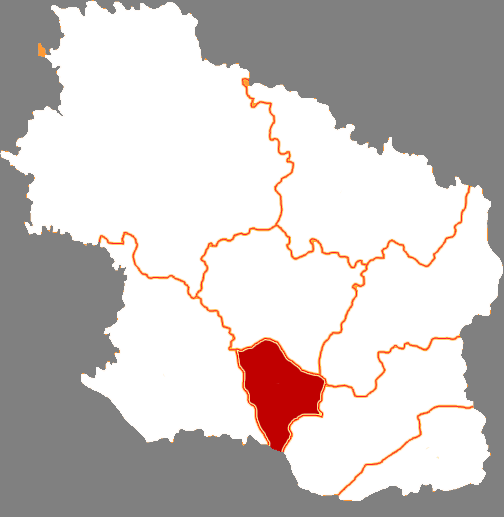
- Xifeng in Qingyang

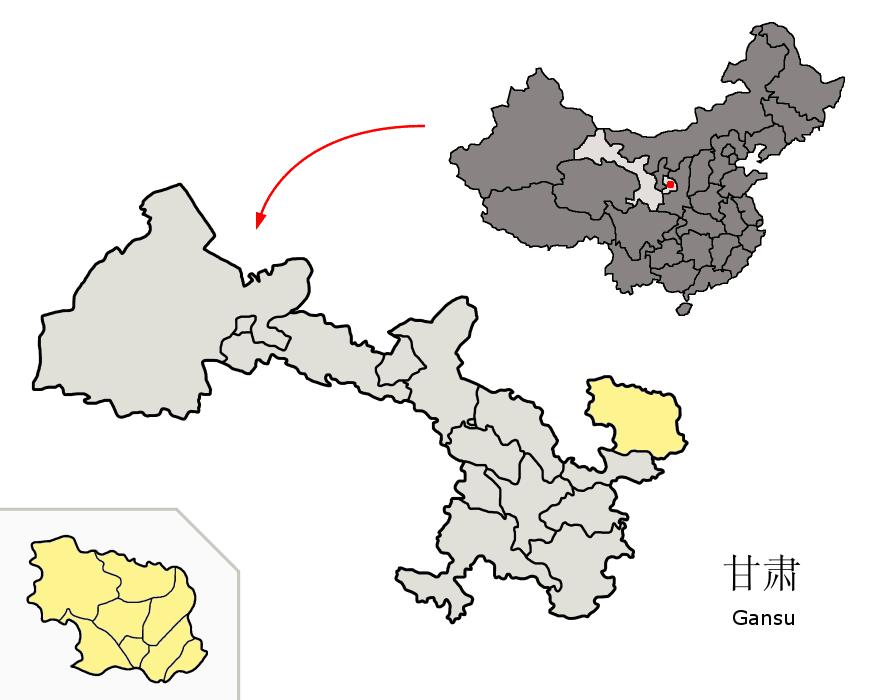
- Qingyang in Gansu

- Location in Gansu
- Coordinates: 35°43′50″N 107°39′03″E
- Country: China
- Province: Gansu
- Prefecture-level city: Qingyang
- District seat: Nanjie Subdistrict

Area
  - Total: 996.35 km^{2} (384.69 sq mi)
- Elevation: 1,421 m (4,662 ft)

Population (2020 census)
  - Total: 513,856
  - Density: 515.74/km^{2} (1,335.8/sq mi)
- Time zone: UTC+8 (China Standard)
- Postal code: 745000
- Website: www.gsxf.gov.cn

Xifeng District (Chinese: 西峰区; pinyin: Xīfēng Qū) is a district and the seat of the city of Qingyang in Gansu Province, China. It has an area of 996 km^{2} (385 sq mi) and a population of 376,800 in 2019.

Inhabited since prehistoric times, it first became an important town in the Ming dynasty, due to its location on the route from Chang'an (Xi'an) to Ningxia.

In 1985, Xifeng was upgraded to a city in Qingyang Prefecture. In 2002, Qingyang Prefecture was upgraded to a prefecture-level city, and Xifeng City (county-level) became its district.

== Economy ==
Xifeng is known as the grain shed of eastern Gansu, but is also known for its fruit orchards.

The Xifeng oilfield located in the district is one of the largest oilfields of the Ordos Basin. Although oil was presumed to be present under Xifeng since 1907, exploitation didn't start until the 1960s.

== Tourism ==
Xifeng is home to the Beishiku temple-grottoes, a system of 195 caves built in 509 AD.

== Geography ==
The district is located centrally on a loess plain named Dongzhiyuan (Chinese: 董志塬) flanked by gullies, at around 1421 m elevation. The plain is considered the world's largest of its kind and estimated to be around 200 m in thickness. Due to erosion, the plain has shrunk over 400 km^{2} (150 mi^{2}) on a total area of 2,200 km^{2} (850 mi^{2}) in the past 100 years.

== Administrative divisions ==
Xifeng District is divided into 3 Subdistricts, 5 towns, and 2 townships.

Subdistricts

- Beijie Subdistrict (北街办事处街道)
- Nanjie Subdistrict (南街办事处街道)
- Xijie Subdistrict (西街办事处街道)

Towns

- Xiaojin (肖金镇)
- Dongzhi (董志镇)
- Houguanzhai (后官寨镇)
- Pengyuan (彭原镇镇)
- Wenquan (温泉镇)

Townships

- Shishe Township (什社乡)
- Xiansheng Township (显胜乡)

== Transport ==
- Qingyang Xifeng Airport
- G22 Qingdao–Lanzhou Expressway
- China National Highway 244
- China National Highway 327
- Qingyang railway station
