= Tengger Desert =

Coordinates: 38°42′N 104°42′E

Tengger Desert Tengri Desert Тэнгэр элс / 腾格里沙漠
- Desert
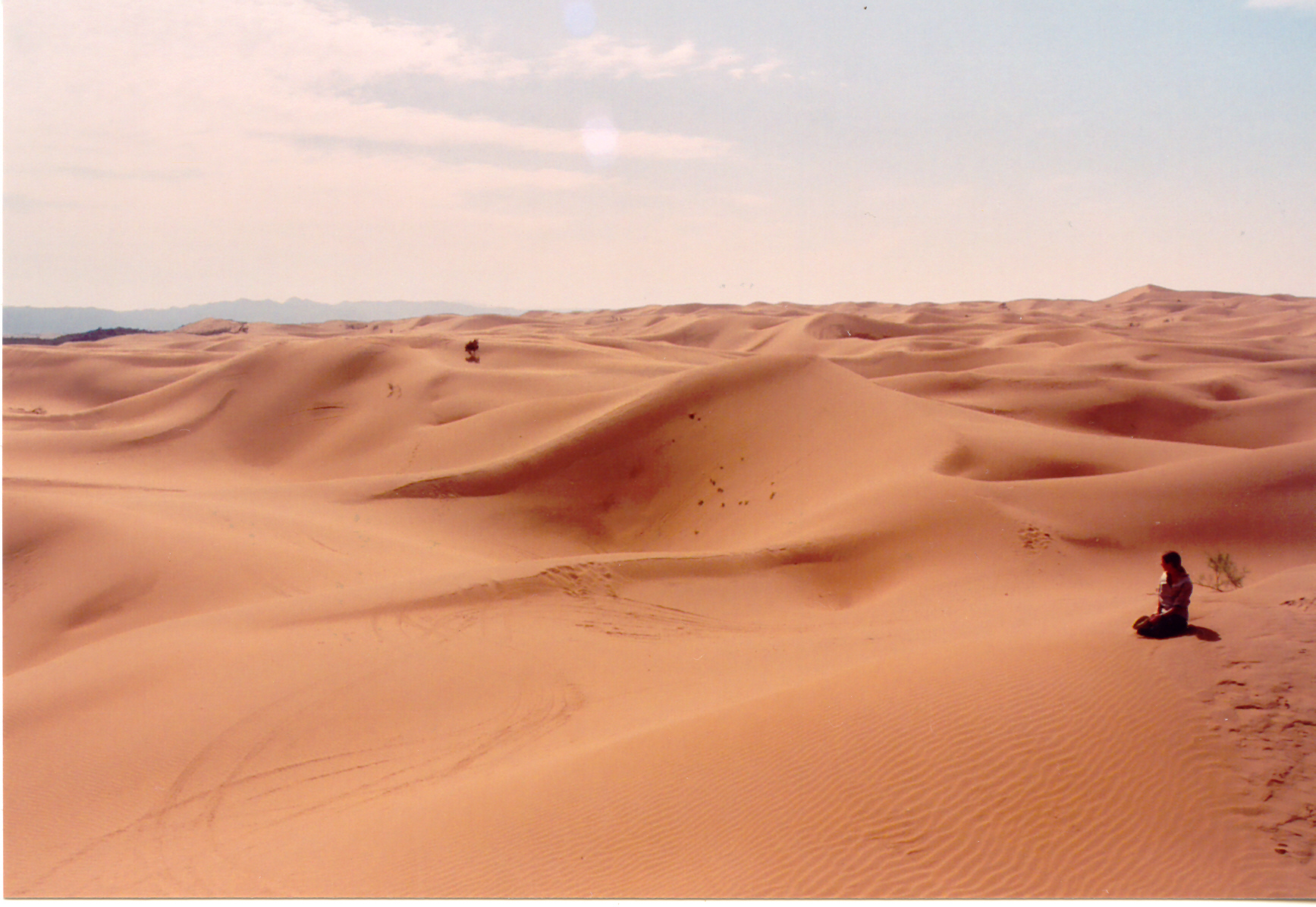
- Landscape of the southern fringe of the Tengger Desert

- Map of China with Inner Mongolia highlighted in orange except Alxa League, where the desert is located, highlighted in red.
- Country: China

Area
  - Total: 36,700 km^{2} (14,200 sq mi)
- Elevation: 1,400 m (4,600 ft)

Tengger Desert

Chinese name
- Chinese: 腾格里沙漠
Transcriptions
Standard Mandarin
- Hanyu Pinyin: Ténggélǐ Shāmò
- Gwoyeu Romatzyh: Ternggerlii Shamoh
- Wade–Giles: Tʻêng^{2}-ko^{2}-li^{3} Sha^{1}-mo^{4}

Mongolian name
- Mongolian Cyrillic: Тэнгэр элс
- Mongolian script: ᠲᠩᠷᠢ ᠡᠯᠡᠰᠦ
Transcriptions
- SASM/GNC: Tngri elesu

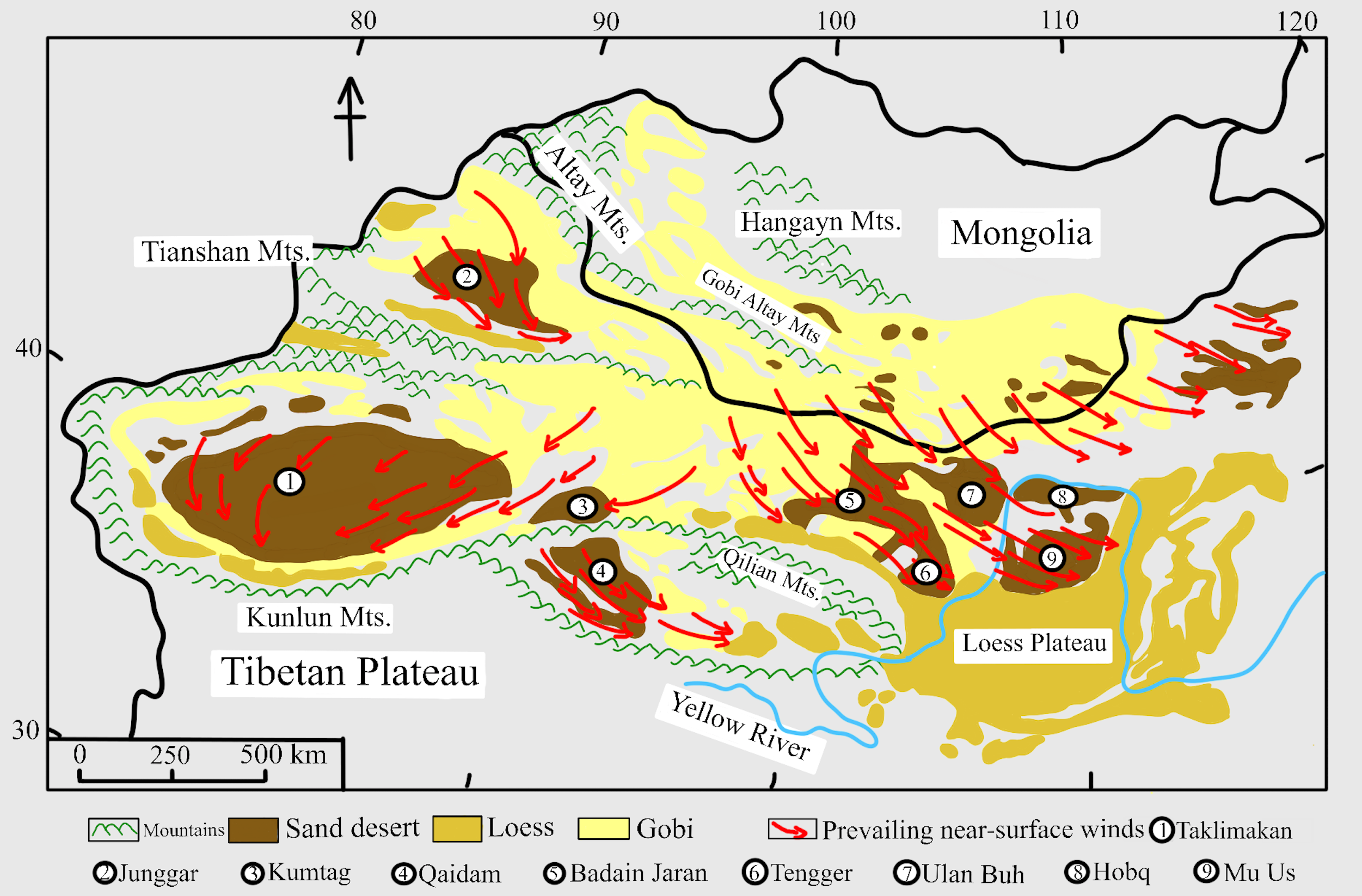
6 - Tengger Desert

The Tengger Desert or Tengri Desert (Mongolian: Тэнгэр элс, Chinese: 腾格里沙漠; pinyin: Ténggélǐ Shāmò; lit. 'Sky Desert') is an arid natural region that covers about 36,700 km^{2} and is mostly in the Inner Mongolia Autonomous Region in China, with a small portion extending into northwestern Ningxia Hui Autonomous Region.

The desert is expanding in size.

== Environmental issues ==
The expansion of the Tengger and its neighbour, the Badain Jaran Desert, has been apparent since the 1950s, when large volumes of water were diverted from rivers to feed agricultural expansion and huge tracts of forest were removed. Since 1958, local governments have mobilised residents for afforestation campaigns to prevent the desert's spread. By 2004, the desert's expansion was estimated as 10 metres per year in some areas. In 2007, a non-profit organisation founded by residents of Minqin County created square ditches lined with hay and grass that they later planted with saxaul to stabilise the sand dunes. In 2010, the central and regional governments announced a five-year reforestation plan to create a 202-km green belt between the Tengger and Badain Jaran deserts. The project was estimated to receive 280 million yuan in funding and involve the relocation of 1,000 residents.

== Features ==
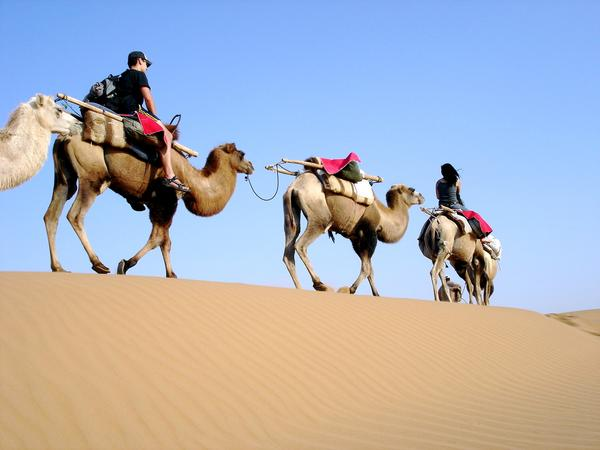
Camel ride in the Tengger Desert, August 19, 2005

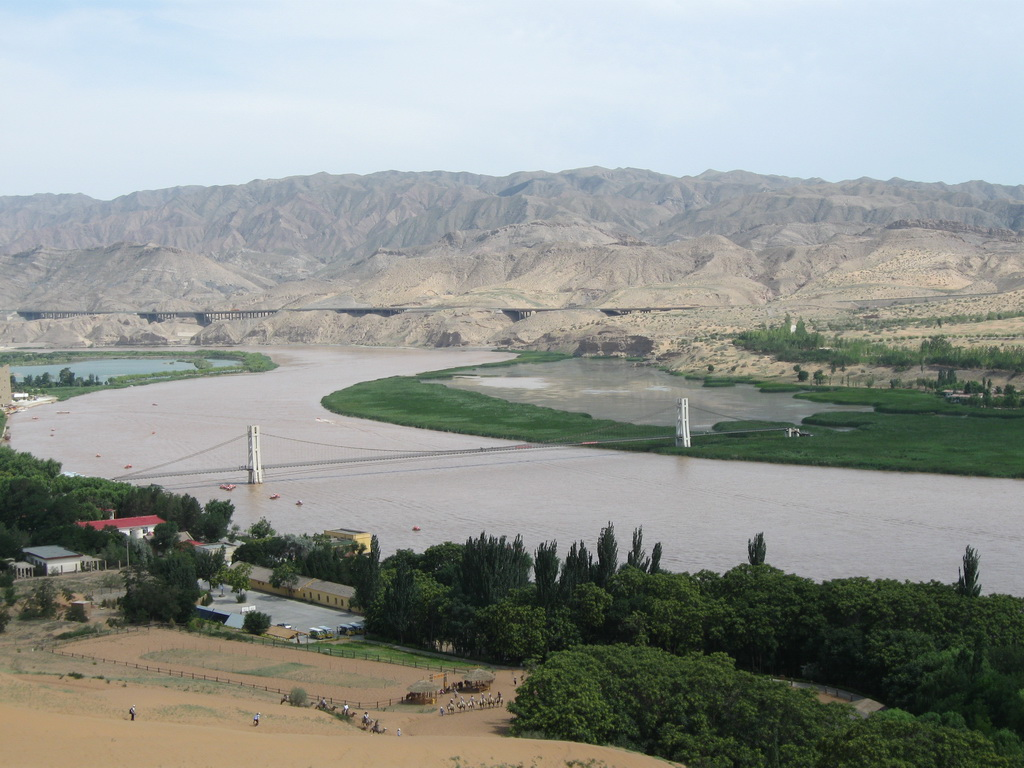
Shapotou District, Tengger Desert

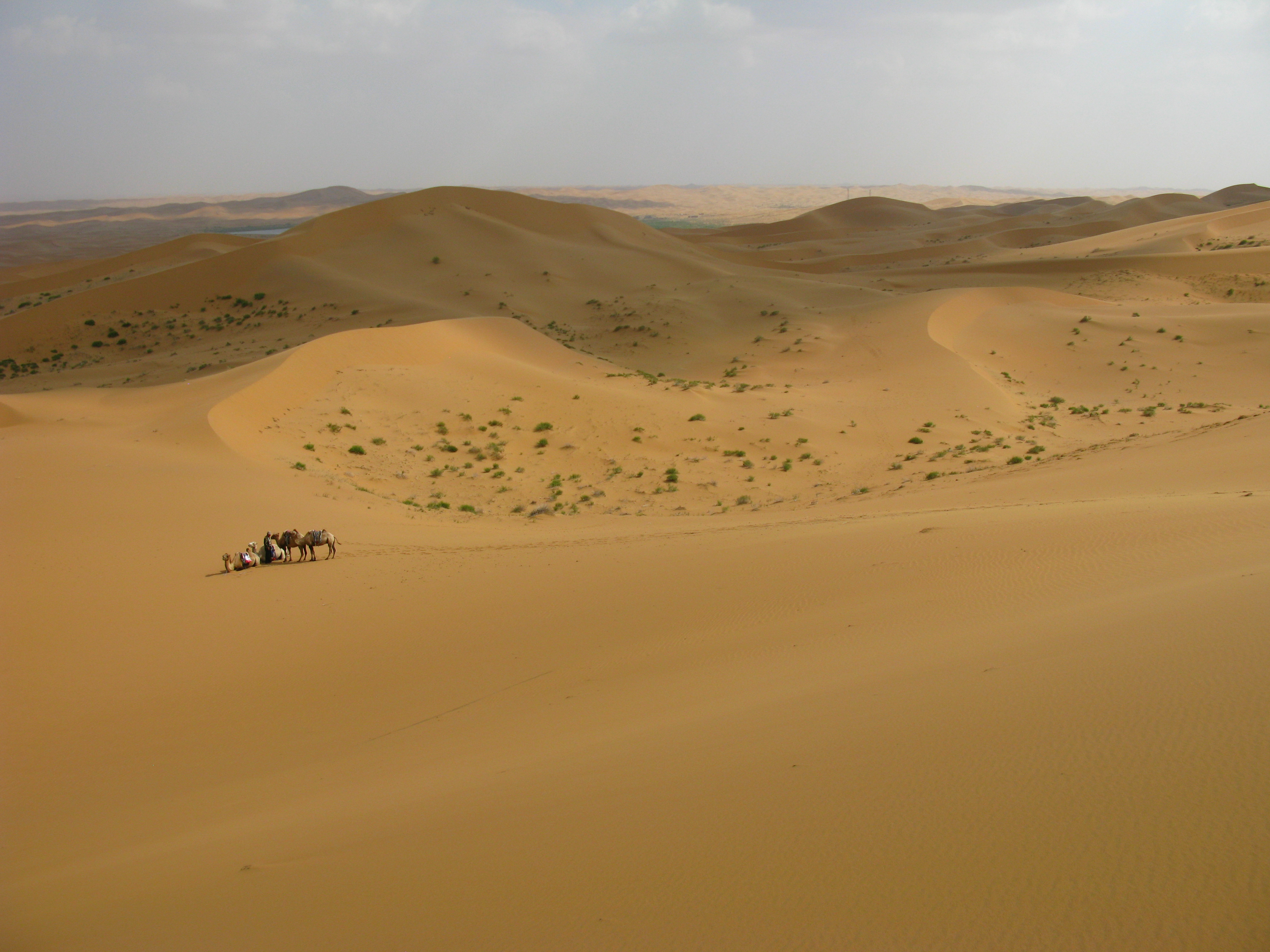
A view of the Tengger Desert

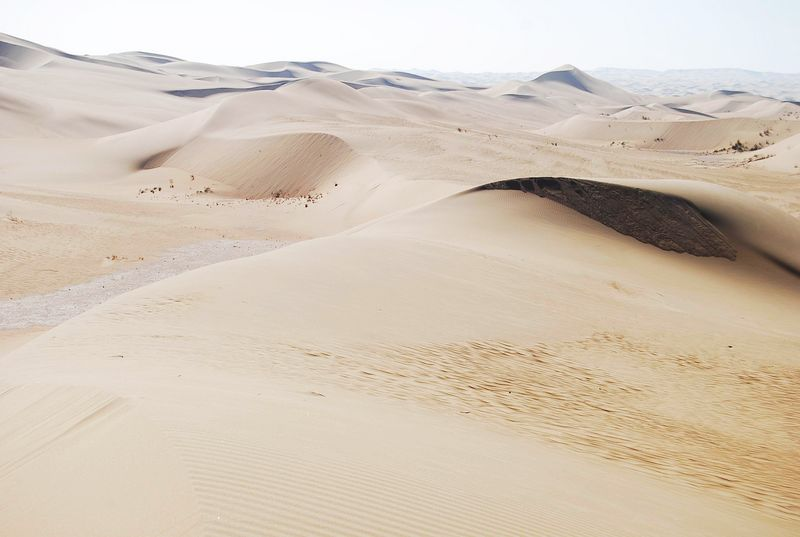
A view of the Tengger Desert

== See also ==
- Shapotou
- Alxa Left Banner
