= Baotou–Yinchuan high-speed railway =

Rail line in China

Baotou–Yinchuan high-speed railway 包银高速铁路

Overview
- Status: Operational
- Termini: Baotou; Yinchuan

Service
- Operator(s): China Railway High-speed

Technical
- Line length: 420.2 km (261 mi)
- Track gauge: 1,435 mm (4 ft 8 1/2 in)
- Operating speed: 250 km/h (155 mph)

The Baotou–Yinchuan high-speed railway is a high-speed railway in China. It is 420.2 kilometres (261.1 mi) long and has a design speed of 250 kilometres per hour (160 mph). A branch from Yinchuan to Alxa Left Banner will be 111.1 kilometres (69.0 mi) long and has a design speed of 200 kilometres per hour (120 mph).

== History ==
On 16 August 2018, construction began on the section from Yinchuan to Huinong South. On 17 May 2022, construction of the remaining section between Huinong South and Yinchuan began.

On 17 July 2024, non-revenue service trains started running on the section between Yinchuan and Huinong South.

On 23 December 2025, the line was made fully operational with the opening of the Baotou-Huinong section.

== Route ==
The railway roughly follows the Baotou–Lanzhou railway.

== Stations ==
- Baotou
- Baiyanhua West
- Urat Front Banner
- Wuyuan
- Bayannao'er
- Dengkou
- Jiangui
- Wuhai
- Wuhai South
- Huinong South
- Shuizuishan
- Shahu
- Yinchuan

Bayanhaote branch:

- Barunbieli
- Bayanhaote

== See also ==
- High-speed rail in China
- Rail transport in China
- Baotou–Lanzhou railway
- Beijing–Lanzhou corridor
