= Yinchuan–Xi'an high-speed railway =

Railway line in China

Yinchuan-Xi'an high-speed railway
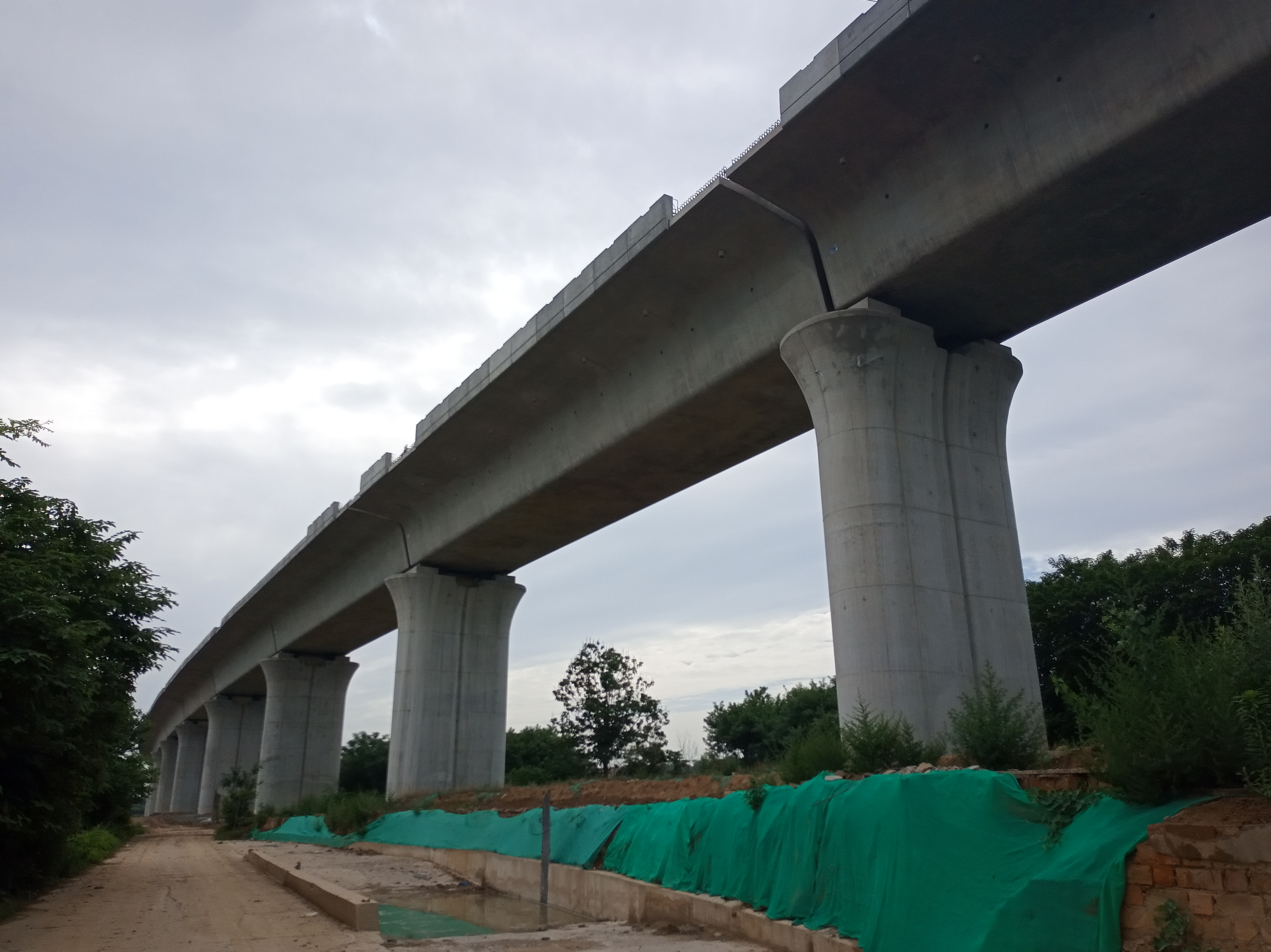
- Viaduct under construction near Xi'an

Overview
- Native name: 银西客运专线
- Status: Operating
- Stations: 20

Service
- Operator(s): China Railway High-speed

History
- Opened: 26 December 2020

Technical
- Line length: 616.55 km (383.11 mi)
- Track gauge: 1,435 mm (4 ft 8 1/2 in)
- Operating speed: 250 km/h (160 mph)

Yinxi Passenger Dedicated Line
- Simplified Chinese: 银西客运专线
- Traditional Chinese: 銀西客運專線
Transcriptions
Standard Mandarin
- Hanyu Pinyin: Yínxī Kèyùn Zhuānxiàn

Yinchuan–Xi'an high-speed railway, is a dual-track, electrified, high-speed rail line in Northwest China between Yinchuan and Xi'an. It is a branch of the Baotou (Yinchuan)–Hainan corridor, part of China's "Eight Vertical and Eight Horizontal" network. The line is the first railway to connect Qingyang to the Chinese railway network, and also the first railway to connect Ningxia and Yinchuan to the high-speed railway network.

== Construction ==
Construction began in December 2015. The longest bridge on the line measures 1,318 m (4,324 ft), and the longest tunnel is 14,251 metres (46,755 ft) long. The first full-length test run was carried out in October 2020. The line opened on 26 December 2020 as planned.

== Route ==
The line has 20 stations in Ningxia, Gansu and Shaanxi.

Between Yinchuan and Wuzhong, the route is shared with the Yinchuan–Lanzhou high-speed railway. This section opened on December 19, 2019.

== Stations ==
Station Name	Chinese	Transfers/connections
Yinchuan		Yinchuan–Lanzhou high-speed railway Baotou–Yinchuan high-speed railway Baotou–Lanzhou railway Taiyuan–Zhongwei–Yinchuan railway
Yinchuan East		
Hedong Airport		
Lingwu North		
Wuzhong		
Huianbao		
Tianshuibao		
Huanxian		
Quzi		
Qingcheng		
Qingyang		
Ningxian		
Binzhou East		
Yongshou West		
Qianxian		Xi'an–Pingliang railway
Liquan South		
Xianyang North		
Xi'an North		Zhengzhou–Xi'an High-Speed Railway; Xi'an–Baoji High-Speed Railway; Datong–Xi'an Passenger Railway; Xi'an–Chengdu high-speed railway Xi'an–Yan'an high-speed railway (under construction); Xi'an Metro: 2 4 14
