= Gantang–Wuwei railway =

Railway line in China

Overview
- Native name: 干武铁路
- Status: Operating
- Termini: Gantang; Wuwei South

Service
- Operator(s): China Railway

History
- Opened: 1 January 1966

Technical
- Line length: 172.2 km (107 mi)
- Track gauge: 1,435 mm (4 ft 8 1/2 in)

The Gantang–Wuwei railway (Chinese: 干武铁路) is a railway line in China. It is 172.2 kilometres (107.0 mi) long. The western terminus of the line is Gantang railway station on the Baotou–Lanzhou railway and the eastern terminus of the line is Wuwei South railway station on the Lanzhou–Xinjiang railway.

== History ==
The line was opened on 1 January 1966. Work to add a second track began in July 2014.
