= Baotou–Lanzhou railway =

Railway line in China

Overview
- Native name: 包兰铁路
- Status: Operational
- Owner: China Railway
- Locale: Inner Mongolia, Ningxia and Gansu, China
- Termini: Baotou; Lanzhou
- Stations: 108

Service
- Type: Heavy rail
- Operator(s): CR Hohhot, CR Lanzhou

Technical
- Line length: 990 km (620 mi)
- Number of tracks: 2 (Baotou–Yinchuan South, Huangyangwan–Gantang), 1 elsewhere
- Track gauge: 1,435 mm (4 ft 8 1/2 in) standard gauge
- Electrification: 25 kV 50 Hz AC (Overhead line)
- Operating speed: Yinchuan–Yinchuan East: 120 km/h (75 mph)
- Signalling: ABS
- Maximum incline: 2% (Wuzhong to Zhongwei South section)

The Baotou–Lanzhou railway (simplified Chinese: 包兰铁路; traditional Chinese: 包蘭鐵路; pinyin: Bāolán tiělù), also known as the Baolan line (Chinese: 包兰线; pinyin: Bāolán xiàn) is a 995 kilometres (618 mi) railway line that connects the cities of Baotou in Inner Mongolia to Lanzhou in Gansu Province. It began operating on 1 August 1958, making it the first Chinese railway through desert.

The Baotou-Huinong section is under the jurisdiction of the Hohhot Railway Bureau, while the Huinong-Lanzhou section is under the jurisdiction of the Lanzhou Railway Bureau. In December 1997, electrification of the Gantang–Lanzhou East section was put into operation, and the Shizuishan–Zhongwei section was electrified in November 1998. In 2009, the Baotou–Huinong section was electrified, completing the electrification of the whole line.

== Cities ==
The railway passes through the following cities:

- Inner Mongolia: Baotou (包头市), Bayan Nur (巴彦淖尔市), Wuhai (乌海市)
- Ningxia: Shizuishan (石嘴山市), Yinchuan (银川市), Wuzhong (吴忠市), Zhongwei (中卫市)
- Gansu: Baiyin (白银市), Lanzhou (兰州市)

== Intersecting railways ==
The Baotou–Lanzou railway connects with eight other railways, most of them connecting in the city of Baotou. In Baotou, the Beijing–Baotou railway extends the line from the Baotou West railway station to Beijing. The Baotou–Shenmu railway leaves Baotou railway station and heads south towards Shenmu county in Shaanxi Province. After passing the Baotou West railway station, the Baotou Ring railway circles around the city and has stops at various stations in Baotou.

At Linhe District in Bayan Nur Municipality, the Linhe–Ceke railway, branches westward off Baotou–Lanzhou railway to Ceke in Alxa League.

In the Ningxia Autonomous Region, the line connects with three other railways. It connects to Pingluo–Rujigou railway near the Huinong District. The Baoji–Zhongwei railway and the Taiyuan–Zhongwei railway join the Baotou–Lanzhou railway at Zhongwei. Also at Gantang the line splits to form the Gantang–Wuwei railway

The railway finally connects with three other railways in Gansu Province. At the Bayin West railway station, the line meets with the Honghui railway, which connects it with Honghui. In Lanzhou, the railway intersects with the Longhai railway, both of which have their termini at Lanzhou. Then at the Lanzhou railway station, the line continues west as the Lanzhou–Xinjiang railway, to the Xinjiang Autonomous Region.

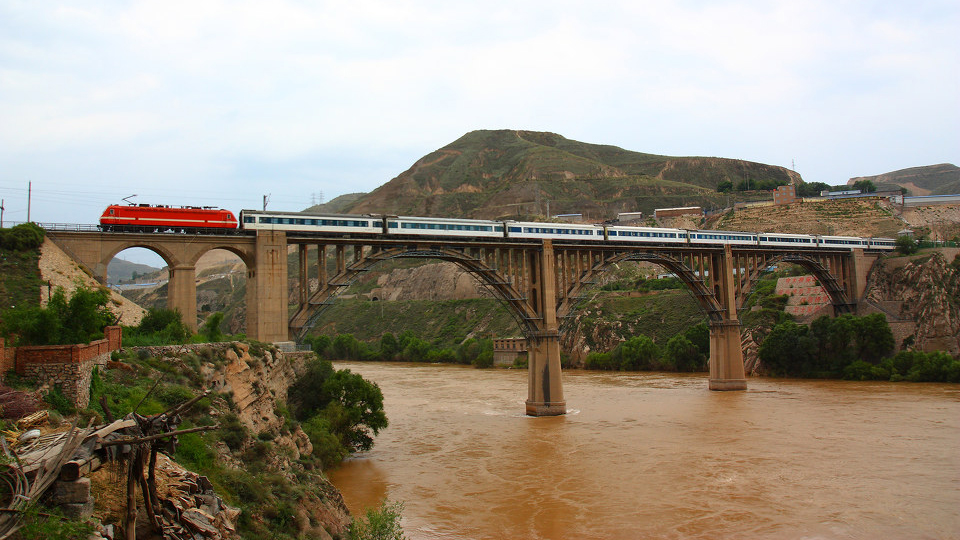
The Baolan railway over the Yellow River at Sangyuanxia.

== See also ==
- Rail transport in China
- Rail transport in Inner Mongolia
- List of railways in China
- Baotou–Yinchuan high-speed railway
