= Yinchuan railway station =

Railway station in Yinchuan, China

Yinchuan 银川
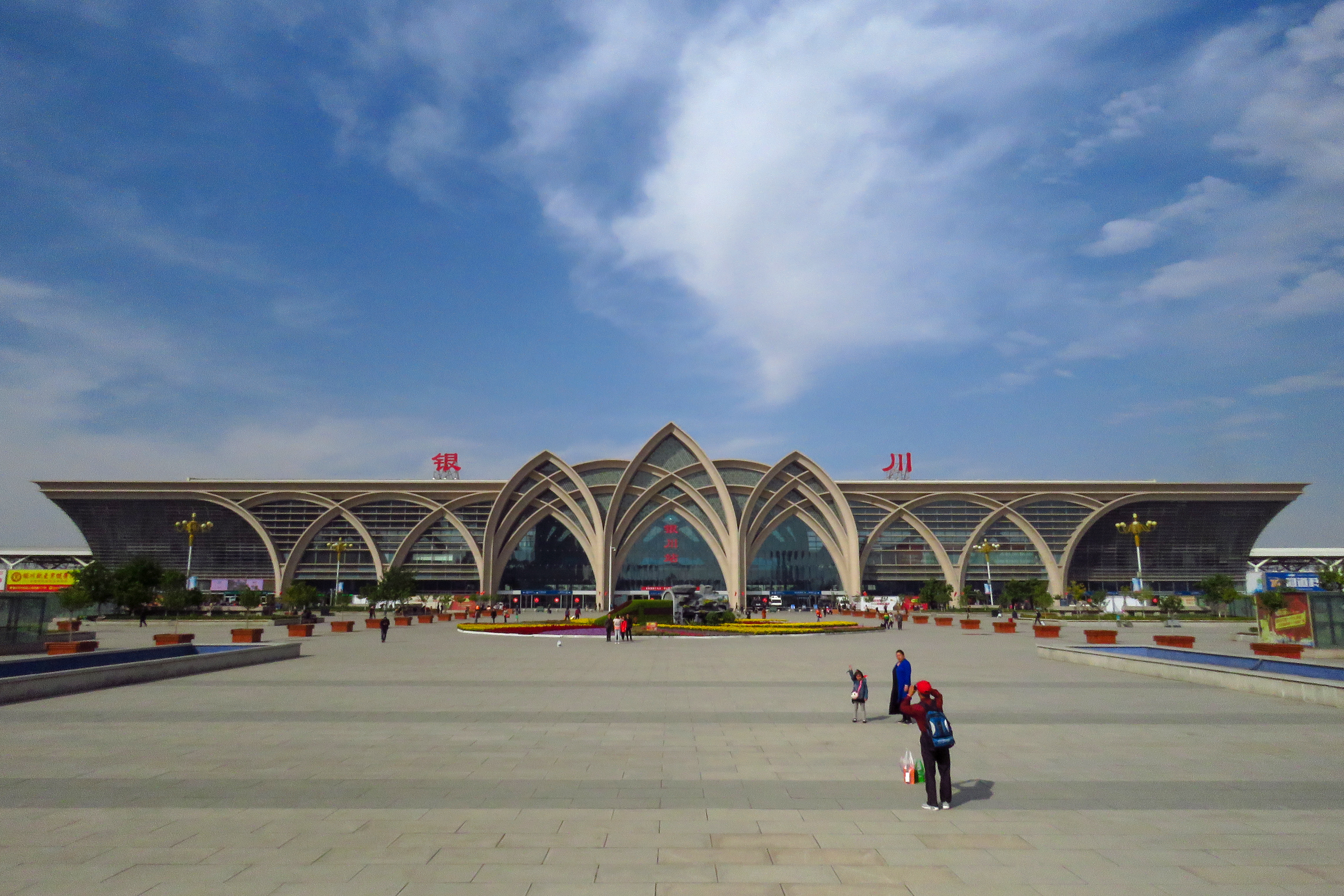

General information
- Location: 710 Shanghai West Road; Jinfeng District, Yinchuan, Ningxia; China
- Coordinates: 38.4916°N 106.1695°E
- Operator: CR Lanzhou
- Lines: China Railway: Baotou–Lanzhou Railway; Taiyuan–Zhongwei–Yinchuan Railway; China Railway High-speed: Yinchuan–Xi'an high-speed railway; Yinchuan–Lanzhou high-speed railway; Baotou–Yinchuan high-speed railway (under construction)
- Platforms: 10
- Tracks: 18
- Connections: Bus terminal

Other information
- Station code: 14846 (TMIS code); YIJ (telegraph code); YCH (Pinyin code)
- Classification: Class 1 station (一等站)

History
- Opened: 1959
- Rebuilt: 1988, 2011

Passengers
- 2023: 10,007,000
Location
- Location within Ningxia Location within China

Yinchuan railway station (simplified Chinese: 银川站; traditional Chinese: 銀川站; pinyin: Yínchuān Zhàn) is the main railway station of Yinchuan, the capital of China's Ningxia province.

The first train arrived at Yinchuan station, then only a stop on the Baotou–Lanzhou railway, on August 1, 1958. The first station building was opened in 1959. In 1988, a new station building was inaugurated, which was replaced in 2011 by a building on the opposite (eastern) side of the platforms.

Since the opening of the Yinchuan–Zhongwei high-speed railway in 2019, the station is served by both conventional and high-speed train services. In 2023, the station exceeded 10 million annual passengers for the first time, of whom 7.6 million travelled on high-speed trains. The average daily number of passenger totaled to 33,300 that year.

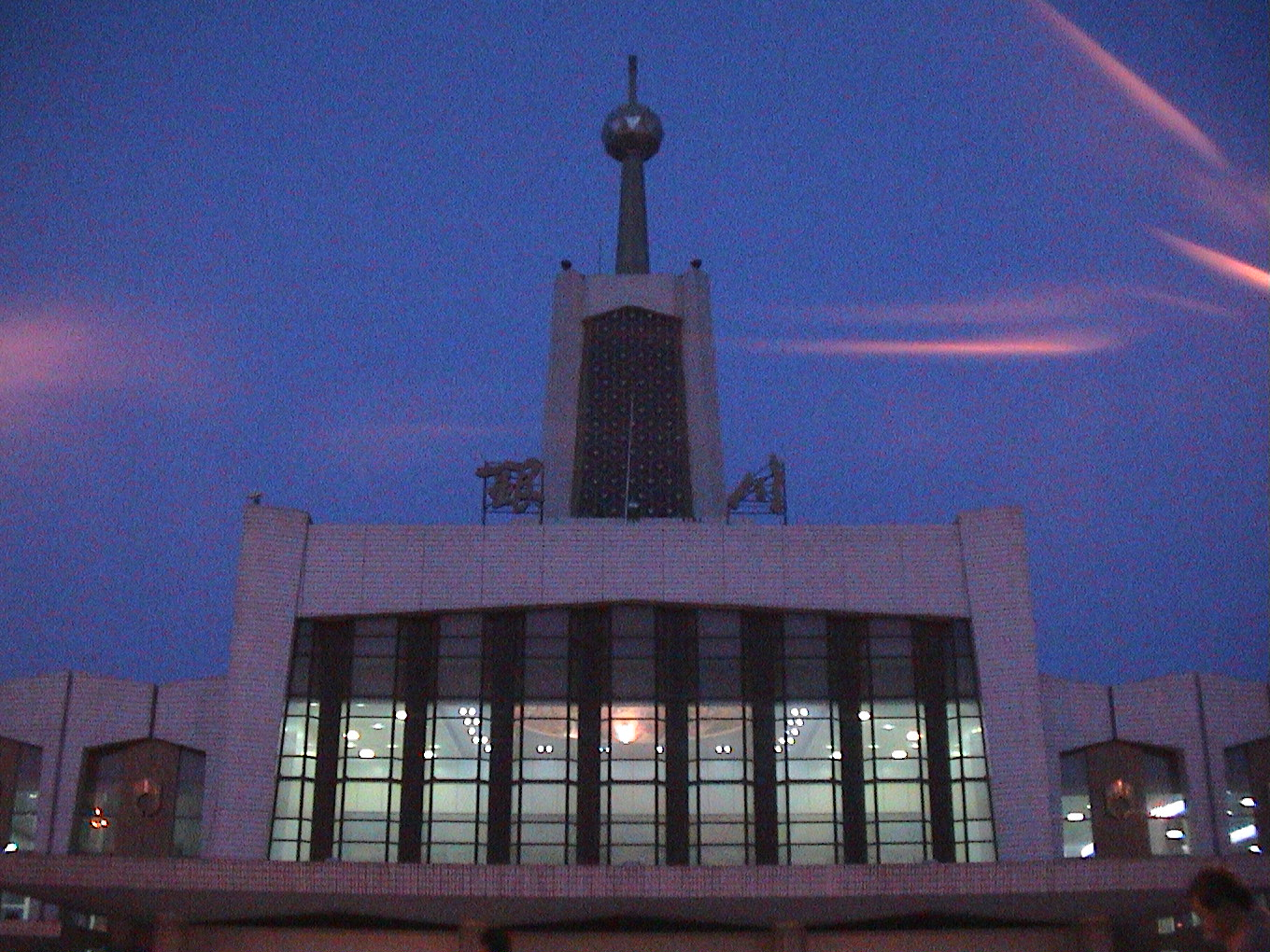
Old station building
