= Xi'an–Pingliang railway =

Railway line in China

The Xi'an–Pingliang Railway is a railway line in China connecting Xi'an in Shaanxi and Pingliang in Gansu, China. The line is 266 km long and has 22 stations.

The railway was a key railway construction project under the 11th Five-Year Plan, with a total investment of RMB 7.798 billion, invested by the Ministry of Railways, Shaanxi Province, Gansu Province and relevant enterprises, and the Xiping Railway Company Ltd. was responsible for the construction of the project. The railway started construction on 20 November 2008, and was opened to traffic on 25 December 2013.

The opening of the railway connected Qingyang to the railway network for the first time.

The railway is a National Grade I single-line electrified railway, of which the Haodian to Taiyu section was built as a double track line, and the rest of is reserved for double line construction in the future. The line has a design speed of 120 km/h and a transport capacity of 30 million tons of freight per year and 1.6 million passengers per year in one direction.

The line has a total of seven strategic loading points, and fourteen special coal branch lines to connect the line, greatly improving the coal mining outbound capacity along the route, and effectively relieving the pressure on National Highways and road transport, allowing for coal resources to central, eastern and southern China to make use of reliable rail transport. With completion of the line, all current thirteen major coal mining areas in the country were connected by rail.

On the other hand, the construction of the railway has also caused serious damage to the ruins of the ancient city of Jingzhou, a provincial-level cultural heritage site in Jingchuan County, which has been repeatedly opposed by the local heritage conservation authorities and the public, but to no avail.

== Incident ==
On 25 April 2016 at around 12:30 p.m., passenger train K8232 was in transit from Binxian to Xi'an when 41 passengers on the train inhaled coal dust and suffered sudden breathing difficulties, nausea and vomiting. The coal dust from the preceding cargo train had intruded into the carriage, and the Xi'an Railway Bureau then took the train to stop at the nearest station, Yongshou Station Passengers who wanted were sent to the hospital for treatment, while other passengers were safely transported to their destinations by means of buses. The carriage in question was replaced with a air-conditioned coach after the incident.
