= List of township-level divisions of Gansu =

This is a list of township-level divisions of the province of Gansu, People's Republic of China (PRC).

== Lanzhou ==
=== Chengguan District ===
Subdistricts:

- Baiyin Road Subdistrict (白银路街道), Caoyang Street Subdistrict (草场街街道), Donggang East Road Subdistrict (东岗西路街道), Donggang Subdistrict (东岗街道), Fulongping Subdistrict (伏龙坪街道), Gaolan Road Subdistrict (皋兰路街道), Gongxingdun Subdistrict (拱星墩街道), Guangwumen Subdistrict (广武门街道), Jiaojiawan Subdistrict (焦家湾街道), Jiayuguan Road Subdistrict (嘉峪关路街道), Jingyuan Road Subdistrict (靖远路街道), Jiuquan Road Subdistrict (酒泉路街道), Linxia Road Subdistrict (临夏路街道), Qingbaishi (青白石街道), Railway Station Subdistrict (火车站街道), Tielu Dongcun Subdistrict (铁路东村街道), Tielu Xicun Subdistrict (铁路西村街道), Tuanjie Xincun (团结新村街道), Weiyuan Road Subdistrict (渭源路街道), Wuquan Subdistrict (五泉街道), Yanbei Subdistrict (雁北街道), Yanchang Road Subdistrict (盐场路街道), Yannan Subdistrict (雁南街道), Yantan Subdistrict (雁南街道), Zhangye Road Subdistrict (张掖路街道)

Others:

- High-tech Zone(高新区), Gansu Agricultural Reclamation Group(甘肃农垦集团), Gansu Prison Enterprise Group Company (甘肃监狱企业集团公司)

=== Qilihe District ===
Subdistricts:

- Xiyuan Subdistrict (西园街道), Xihu Subdistrict (西湖街道), Jianlanlu Subdistrict (建兰路街道), Dunhuanglu Subdistrict (敦煌路街道), Xizhan Subdistrict (西站街道), Yanjiaping Subdistrict (晏家坪街道), Gongjiawan Subdistrict (龚家湾街道), Tumendun Subdistrict (土门墩街道), Xiuchuan Subdistrict (秀川街道)

Towns:

- A'gan(阿干镇), Bali(八里镇), Pengjiaping(彭家坪镇), Xiguoyuan(西果园镇), Huangyu(黄峪镇)

Townships:

- Weiling Township(魏岭乡)

=== Xigu District ===
Subdistricts:

- Chenping Subdistrict (陈坪街道), Xianfenglu Subdistrict (先锋路街道), Fulilu Subdistrict (福利路街道), Xigucheng Subdistrict (西固城街道), Sijiqing Subdistrict (四季青街道), Lintaojie Subdistrict (临洮街街道), Xiliugou Subdistrict (西柳沟街道), Xin'anlu Subdistrict (新安路街道)

Towns:

- Xincheng(新城镇), Dongchuan(东川镇), Hekou(河口镇), Dachuan(达川镇), Liuquan(柳泉镇)

Townships:

- Jingou Township(金沟乡)

=== Anning District ===
Subdistricts:

- Peili Subdistrict (培黎街道), Xilu Subdistrict (西路街道), Shajingyi Subdistrict (沙井驿街道), Shilidian Subdistrict (十里店街道), Kongjiaya Subdistrict (孔家崖街道), Yintanlu Subdistrict (银滩路街道), Liujiabao Subdistrict (刘家堡街道), Anningbao Subdistrict (安宁堡街道)

=== Honggu District ===
Subdistricts:

- Yaojie Subdistrict (窑街街道), Xiayao Subdistrict (下窑街道), Kuangqu Subdistrict (矿区街道), Hualong Subdistrict (华龙街道)

Towns:

- Haishiwan(海石湾镇), Huazhuang(花庄镇), Ping'an(平安镇), Honggu(红古镇)

=== Yongdeng County ===
Towns:

- Chengguan (城关镇), Hongcheng (红城镇), Zhongbao (中堡镇), Wushengyi (武胜驿镇), Heqiao (河桥镇), Liancheng (连城镇), Kushui (苦水镇), Datong (大同镇), Longquansi(龙泉寺镇), Shuping(树屏镇), Shangchuan(上川镇), Liushu(柳树镇), Tongyuan(通远镇)

Townships:

- Pingcheng Township(坪城乡), Minle Township(民乐乡), Qishan Township(七山乡)

=== Gaolan County ===
Towns:

- Shidong (石洞镇), Zhonghe (忠和镇), Shichuan (什川镇), Jiuhe (九合镇), Shuifu (水阜镇), Heishi (黑石镇)

=== Yuzhong County ===
Towns:

- Chengguan (城关镇), Xiaguanying (夏官营镇), Gaoya (高崖镇), Jinya (金崖镇), Heping (和平镇), Gancaodian (甘草店镇), Qingcheng (青城镇), Dingyuan (定远镇), Lianda(连搭镇), Xinying(新营镇), Gongjing(贡井镇)

Townships:

- Xiaokangying Township(小康营乡), Mapo Township(马坡乡), Qingshuiyi Township(清水驿乡), Longquan Township (龙泉乡), Weiying Township(韦营乡), Zhonglianchuan Township(中连川乡), Yuanzicha Township (园子岔乡), Shanghuacha Township(上花岔乡), Haxian Township(哈岘乡)

=== Lanzhou New Area ===
Towns:

- Zhongchuan (中川镇), Qinchuan (秦川镇), Xicha (西岔镇)

== Jiayuguan ==
Districts:

- Xiongguan District (雄关区), Jingtie District (镜铁区). Changcheng District (长城区)

Towns:

- Xincheng(新城镇), Yuquan(峪泉镇), Wenshu(文殊镇)

== Jinchang ==
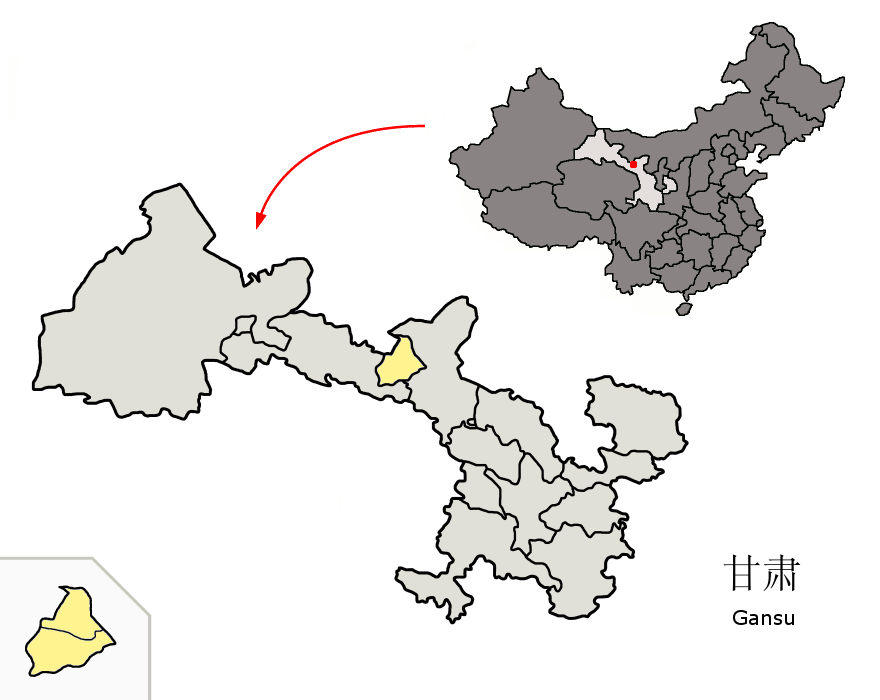
Location of Jinchang Prefecture within Gansu

=== Jinchuan District ===
Six subdistricts:

- Binhelu (滨河路街道), Guilinlu (桂林路街道), Beijinglu (北京路街道), Jinchuanlu (金川路街道), Xinhualu (新华路街道), Guangzhoulu (广州路街道)

Two towns:

- Ningyuanbu (宁远堡镇), Shuangwan (双湾镇)

=== Yongchang County ===
Six towns:

- Chengguan (城关镇), Hexibu (河西堡镇), Xinchengzi (新城子镇), Zhuwangbu (朱王堡镇), Dongzhai (东寨镇), Shuiyuan (水源镇)

Four townships:

- Hongshanyao (红山窑乡), Jiaojiazhuang (焦家庄乡), Liuba (六坝乡), Nanba (南坝乡)

== Baiyin ==
=== Baiyin District ===
Subdistricts:

- Renminlu Subdistrict (人民路街道), Gongyuanlu Subdistrict (公园路街道), Silonglu Subdistrict (四龙路街道), Gongnonglu Subdistrict (工农路街道), Fangzhilu Subdistrict (纺织路街道)

Towns:

- Shuichuan(水川镇), Silong(四龙镇), Wangxian(王岘镇)

Townships:

- Qiangwan Township(强湾乡), Wuchuan Township(武川乡)

=== Pingchuan District ===
Subdistricts:

- Changzheng Subdistrict (长征街道), Dianlilu Subdistrict (电力路街道), Honghuilu Subdistrict (红会路街道), Xingpinglu Subdistrict (兴平路街道)

Towns:

- Wangjiashan(王家山镇), Shuiquan(水泉镇), Gonghe(共和镇), Baoji(宝积镇), Huangqiao(黄峤镇)

Townships:

- Zhongtian Township(种田乡), Fuxing Township(复兴乡)

=== Jingyuan County ===
Towns:

- Beiwan(北湾镇), Dongwan(东湾镇), Wulan(乌兰镇), Liuchuan(刘川镇), Beitan(北滩镇), Wuhe(五合镇), Dalu(大芦镇), Mitan(糜滩镇), Gaowan(高湾镇), Pingbao(平堡镇), Dongsheng(东升镇), Shuanglong(双龙镇), Sandan(三滩镇)

Townships:

- Xinglong Township(兴隆乡), Shimen Township(石门乡), Jing'an Township(靖安乡), Yongxin Township(永新乡), Ruoli Township(若笠乡)

=== Huining County ===
Towns:

- Huishi(会师镇), Guochengyi(郭城驿镇), Hepan(河畔镇), Touzhaizi(头寨子镇), Taipingdian(太平店镇), Gangouyi(甘沟驿镇), Houjiachuan(侯家川镇), Chaijiamen(柴家门镇), Hanjiacha(汉家岔镇), Liujiazhaizi (刘家寨子镇), Baicaoyuan(白草塬镇), Dagou(大沟镇), Sifangwu(四房吴镇), Zhongchuan(中川镇), Laojunpo(老君坡镇), Pingtouchuan(平头川镇), Dingjiagou(丁家沟镇), Yangyaji(杨崖集镇), Zhaijiasuo(翟家所镇), Hanjiaji(韩家集镇), Tumenxia(土门岘镇), Xinyuan(新塬镇), Caotan(草滩镇), Xinzhuang(新庄镇)

Townships:

- Dangjiaxian Township(党家岘乡), Baliwan Township(八里湾乡), Tugaoshan Township(土高山乡)

Ethnic Townships:

- Xintianbao Hui Township(新添堡回族乡)

=== Jingtai County ===
Towns:

- Yitiaoshan(一条山镇), Luyang(芦阳镇), Shangshawo(上沙沃镇), Xiquan(喜泉镇), Caowotan(草窝滩镇), Hongshui(红水镇), Zhongquan(中泉镇), Zhenglu(正路镇)

Townships:

- Sitan Township(寺滩乡), Wufo Township(五佛乡), Manshuitan Township(漫水滩乡), Tiaoshan Township(条山集团)

== Tianshui ==
=== Qinzhou District ===
Subdistricts:

- Dacheng Subdistrict (大城街道), Qilitun Subdistrict (七里墩街道), Dongguan Subdistrict (东关街道), Zhongcheng Subdistrict (中城街道), Xiguan Subdistrict (西关街道), Shimaping Subdistrict (石马坪街道), Tianshuijun Subdistrict (天水郡街道)

Towns:

- Yuquan (玉泉镇), Taijing (太京镇), Jikou (藉口镇), Zaojiao (皂郊镇), Wangchuan (汪川镇), Mudan (牡丹镇), Guanzi (关子镇), Pingnan (平南镇), Tianshui (天水镇), Niangniangba (娘娘坝镇), Zhongliang (中梁镇), Yangjiasi (杨家寺镇), Qishou (齐寿镇), Damen (大门镇), Qinling (秦岭镇), Huaqi (华歧镇)

=== Maiji District ===
Subdistricts:

- Daobei Subdistrict (道北街道), Beidaobu Subdistrict (北道埠街道), Qiaonan Subdistrict (桥南街道)

Towns:

- Shetang (社棠镇), Mapaoquan (马跑泉镇), Ganquan (甘泉镇), Weinan (渭南镇), Dongcha (东岔镇), Hua'niu (花牛镇), Zhongtan (中滩镇), Xinyang (新阳镇), Yuanlong (元龙镇), Boyang (伯阳镇), Maiji (麦积镇), Shifo (石佛镇), Sancha (三岔镇), Hupo (琥珀镇), Liqiao (利桥镇), Wulong (五龙镇), Dangchuan (党川镇)

Others:

- Tianshui Economic Development Zone (水经济开发区), Tianshui High-tech Industrial Park (水市高新技术工业园), Tianshui City Agricultural High-tech Demonstration Zone (水市农业高新技术示范区), Sanyang Industrial Demonstration Zone (三阳工业示范区), Nianpu Industrial Demonstration Zone (廿铺工业示范区), Dongkehe Industrial Park (东柯河工业园区)

=== Qingshui County ===
Towns:

- Yongqing (永清镇), Hongbao (红堡镇), Baituo (白驼镇), Jinji (金集镇), Qinting (秦亭镇), Shanmen (山门镇), Baisha (白沙镇), Wanghe (王河镇), Guochuan (郭川镇), Huangmen (黄门镇), Songshu (松树镇), Yuanmen (远门镇), Tumen (土门镇), Caochuanpu (草川铺镇), Longdong (陇东镇)

Townships:

- Jiachuan Township(贾川乡), Fengwang Township(丰望乡), Xincheng Township(新城乡)

Others:

- Qingshui County Science and Technology Breeding Demonstration Park (清水县科技养殖示范园区)

=== Qin'an County ===
Towns:

- Xingguo (兴国镇), Lianhua (莲花镇), Xichuan (西川镇), Longcheng (陇城镇), Guojia (郭嘉镇), Wuying (五营镇), Yebao (叶堡镇), Weidian (魏店镇), Anfu (安伏镇), Qianhu (千户镇), Wangyin (王尹镇), Xingfeng (兴丰镇), Zhongshan (中山镇), Liuping (刘坪镇), Wangpu (王铺镇), Wangyao (王窑镇), Yunshan (云山镇)

=== Gangu County ===
Towns:

- Daxiangshan (大像山镇), Xinxing (新兴镇), Pan'an (磐安镇), Liufeng (六峰镇), Anyuan (安远镇), Jinshan (金山镇), Dashi (大石镇), Lixin (礼辛镇), Wujiahe (武家河镇), Dazhuang (大庄镇), Gupo (古坡镇), Baliwan (八里湾镇), Xiping (西坪镇)

Townships:

- Xiejiawan Township(谢家湾乡), Baijiawan Township (白家湾乡)

=== Wushan County ===
Towns:

- Chengguan (城关镇), Luomen (洛门镇), Yuanyang (鸳鸯镇), Tange (滩歌镇), Simen (四门镇), Mali (马力镇), Shandan (山丹镇), Wenquan (温泉镇), Hualin (桦林镇), Longtai (龙台镇), Yupan (榆盘镇), Gaolou (高楼镇), Yanghe (杨河镇)

Townships:

- Zuitou Township(咀头乡), Yan'an Township (沿安乡)

=== Zhangjiachuan Hui Autonomous County ===
Towns:

- Zhangjiachuan (张家川镇), Longshan (龙山镇), Gongmen (恭门镇), Malu (马鹿镇), Liangshan (梁山镇), Maguan (马关镇), Liubao (刘堡镇), Huchuan (胡川镇), Dayang (大阳镇), Chuanwang (川王镇)

Townships:

- Zhangmian Township(张棉乡), Muhe Township (木河乡), Lianwu Township(连五乡), Ping'an Township (平安乡), Yanjia Township(阎家乡)

== Wuwei ==
=== Liangzhou District ===
Subdistricts:

- Dongdajie Subdistrict (东大街街道), Xidajie Subdistrict (西大街街道), Dongguanjie Subdistrict (东关街街道), Xiguanjie Subdistrict (西关街街道), Huochezhanjie Subdistrict (火车站街街道), Dizhixincunjie Subdistrict (地质新村街街道), Ronghuajie Subdistrict (荣华街街道), Xuanwujie Subdistrict (宣武街街道), Huangyanghe Subdistrict (黄羊河街道)

Towns:

- Huangyang (黄羊镇), Wunan (武南镇), Qingyuan (清源镇), Yongchang (永昌镇), Shuangcheng (双城镇), Fengle (丰乐镇), Gaoba (高坝镇), Jinyang (金羊镇), Heping (和平镇), Yangxiaba (羊下坝镇), Zhongba (中坝镇), Yongfeng (永丰镇), Gucheng (古城镇), Zhangyi (张义镇), Fafang (发放镇), Xiying (西营镇), Siba (四坝镇), Hongxiang (洪祥镇), Xiehe (谢河镇), Jinsha (金沙镇), Songshu (松树镇), Huai'an (怀安镇), Xiashuang (下双镇), Qingshui (清水镇), Hedong (河东镇), Wuhe (五和镇), Changcheng (长城镇), Wujiajing (吴家井镇), Jinhe (金河镇), Hanzuo (韩佐镇), Daliu (大柳镇), Boshu (柏树镇), Jinta (金塔镇), Jiudun (九墩镇), Jinshan (金山镇), Xinhua (新华镇), Kangning (康宁镇)

Others:

- Jiuduntan Headquarters(九墩滩指挥部), Dengmaying Lake Ecological Construction Headquarters(邓马营湖生态建设指挥部)

=== Minqin County ===
Towns:

- Sanlei (三雷镇), Dongba (东坝镇), Quanshan (泉山镇), Xiqu (西渠镇), Donghu (东湖镇), Hongshagang (红砂岗镇), Changning (昌宁镇), Chongxing (重兴镇), Xuebai (薛百镇), Daba (大坝镇), Suwu (苏武镇), Datan (大滩镇), Shuangcike (双茨科镇), Hongshaliang (红沙梁镇), Caiqi (蔡旗镇), Jiahe (夹河镇), Shoucheng (收成镇), Nanhu (南湖镇)

=== Gulang County ===
Towns:

- Gulang (古浪镇), Sishui (泗水镇), Tumen (土门镇), Dajing (大靖镇), Peijiaying (裴家营镇), Haizitan (海子滩镇), Dingning (定宁镇), Huangyangchuan (黄羊川镇), Heisongyi (黑松驿镇), Yongfengtan (永丰滩镇), Huanghuatan (黄花滩镇), Xijing (西靖镇), Minquan (民权镇), Zhitan (直滩镇), Gufeng (古丰镇)

Townships:

- Xinpu Township(新堡乡), Gancheng Township (干城乡), Hengliang Township(横梁乡), Shibalipu Township(十八里堡乡)

=== Tianzhu Tibetan Autonomous County ===
Towns:

- Huazangsi (华藏寺镇), Dachaigou (打柴沟镇), Anyuan (安远镇), Tanshanling (炭山岭镇), Haxi (哈溪镇), Saishensi (赛什斯镇), Shimen (石门镇), Songshan (松山镇), Tiantang (天堂镇), Doshi (朵什镇), Xidatan (西大滩镇), Zhuaxixiulong (抓喜秀龙镇), Dahonggou (大红沟镇), Qilian (祁连镇)

Townships:

- Dongping Township(东坪乡), Sailalong Township (赛拉隆乡), Dongdatan Township(东大滩乡), Maozang Township(毛藏乡), Danma Township(旦马乡)

Others:

- Tianzhu Building Material Factory (天祝建材厂), Tianzhu Coal and Electricity Company (天祝煤电公司)

== Zhangye ==
=== Ganzhou District ===
Subdistricts:

- Dongjie Subdistrict(东街街道), Nanjie Subdistrict (南街街道), Xijie Subdistrict(西街街道), Beijie Subdistrict(北街街道), Huochezhan Subdistrict(火车站街道)

Towns:

- Liangjiadun (梁家墩镇), Shangqin (上秦镇), Daman (大满镇), Shajing (沙井镇), Wujiang (乌江镇), Ganjun (甘浚镇), Xindun (新墩镇), Dangzhai (党寨镇), Jiantan (碱滩镇), Sanzha (三闸镇), Xiaoman (小满镇), Mingyong (明永镇), Chang'an (长安镇)

Townships:

- Longqu Township(龙渠乡), Anyang Township (安阳乡), Huazhai Township(花寨乡), Jing'an Township(靖安乡)

Ethnic Townships:

- Pingshanhu Mongol Township(平山湖蒙古族乡)

Others:

- Zhangye Economic and Technological Development Zone(张掖经济技术开发区)

=== Sunan Yugu Autonomous County ===
Towns:

- Hongwansi (红湾寺镇), Huangcheng (皇城镇), Kangle (康乐镇)

Townships:

- Dahe Township(大河乡), Minghua Township (明花乡)

Ethnic Townships:

- Mati Tibetan Township(马蹄藏族乡), Baiyin Mongol Township(白银蒙古族乡), Qifeng Tibetan Township (祁丰蔵族乡)

Others:

- Gansu Sheep Breeding Farm(甘肃省绵羊育种场), Zhangye Baopinghe Ranch (张掖宝瓶河牧场)

=== Minle County ===
Towns:

- Hongshui (洪水镇), Liuba (六坝镇), Xintian (新天镇), Nangu(南古镇), Yonggu (永固镇), Sanbao(三堡镇), Nanfeng(南丰镇), Minlian (民联镇), Shunhua(顺化镇), Fengle (丰乐镇)

Others:

- Minle Ecological Industrial Park(民乐生态工业园区)

=== Linze County ===
Towns:

- Shahe (沙河镇), Xinhua (新华镇), Liaoquan (蓼泉镇), Pingchuan(平川镇), Banqiao (板桥镇), Ya'nuan(鸭暖镇), Nijiaying (倪家营镇)

Others:

- State-owned Linze Farm (国营临泽农场), Wuquan Forest Farm(五泉林场), Shahe Forest Farm (沙河林场), Koizumizi Sand Control Station(小泉子治沙站), Gardening field(园艺场), Seed breeding ground (良种繁殖场)

=== Gaotai County ===
Towns:

- Chengguan (城关镇), Xuanhua (宣化镇), Nanhua (南华镇), Hangdao(巷道镇), Heli (合黎镇), Luotuocheng(骆驼城镇), Xinba (新坝镇), Heiquan(黑泉镇), Luocheng (罗城镇)

Others:

- Gansu Gaotai Industrial Park (甘肃高台工业园区)

=== Shandan County ===
Towns:

- Qingquan (清泉镇), Weiqi (位奇镇), Huocheng (霍城镇), Chenhu (陈户镇), Damaying (大马营镇), Dongle(东乐镇)

Townships:

- Laojun (老军乡), Liqiao(李桥乡)

Others:

- State-owned Shandan Farm (国营山丹农场), Shandan Racecourse of China Animal Husbandry Company (中牧公司山丹马场)

== Pingliang ==
=== Kongtong District ===
Subdistricts:

- Zhonghualu Subdistrict (东关街道), Yongdinglu Subdistrict (中街街道), Futailu Subdistrict (西郊街道)

Towns:

- Kongdong(崆峒镇), Baishui(白水镇), Caofeng(草峰镇), Anguo(安国镇), Liuhu(柳湖镇), Sishilipu(四十里铺镇), Huasuo(花所镇)

Townships:

- Suoluo Township(索罗乡), Xianglian Township(香莲乡), Xiyang Township(西阳乡), Daqin Township(大秦乡), Baimiao Township(白庙乡), Zhaihe Township(寨河乡), Dazhai Township(大寨乡), Shangyang Township (上杨乡), Mawu Township(麻武乡), Xiamen Township(峡门乡)

Others:

- Pingliang Kongtong Mountain Scenic Area Management Committee(平凉崆峒山大景区管理委员会)

=== Jingchuan County ===
subdistrictss:

- Chengshishequ Subdistrict (城市社区街道)

Towns:

- Chengguan (城关镇), Yudu (玉都镇), Gaoping (高平镇), Libao (荔堡镇), Wangcun (王村镇), Yaodian (窑店镇), Feiyun (飞云镇), Fengtai (丰台镇), Dangyuan (党原镇), Shefeng (汭丰镇), Taiping (太平镇)

Townships:

- Luohandong Township(罗汉洞乡), Jingming Township(泾明乡), Honghe Township (红河乡)

Others:

- Zhanglaosi Farm(张老寺农场)

=== Lingtai County ===
Subdistricts:

- Chengshishequ Subdistrict (城市社区街道)

Towns:

- Zhongtai (中台镇), Shaozhai (邵寨镇), Dudian (独店镇), Shizi (什字镇), Chaona (朝那镇), Xitun (西屯镇), Shangliang (上良镇), Baili (百里镇), Puwo (蒲窝镇)

Townships:

- Xinkai Township(新开乡), Liangyuan Township(梁原乡), Longmen Township(龙门乡), Xinghuo Township(星火乡)

Others:

- Wanbaochuan Farm(万宝川农场)

=== Chongxin County ===
Subdistricts:

- Chengshishequ Subdistrict (城市社区街道)

Towns:

- Jinping (锦屏镇), Xinyao (新窑镇), Boshu (柏树镇), Huangzhai (黄寨镇)

Townships:

- Huanghua Township(黄花乡), Mulin Township (木林乡)

=== Zhuanglang County ===
Subdistricts:

- Shuiluo Subdistrict (水洛街道)

Towns:

- Shuiluo (水洛镇), Nanhu (南湖镇), Zhudian (朱店镇), Wanquan (万泉镇), Handian (韩店镇), Wolong (卧龙镇), Yangchuan (阳川镇), Pan'an (盘安镇), Dazhuang (大庄镇), Tonghua (通化镇), Yongning (永宁镇), Liangyi (良邑镇), Yuebao (岳堡镇), Liuliang (柳梁镇), Nanping (南坪镇镇)

Townships:

- Yanghe Township(杨河乡), Zhaodun Township(赵墩乡), Zhenghe Township (郑河乡)

=== Jingning County ===
Subdistricts:

- Chengqu Subdistrict (城区街道)

Towns:

- Chengguan (城关镇), Weirong (威戎镇), Jieshipu (界石铺镇), Bali (八里镇), Lidian (李店镇), Gucheng (古城镇), Renda (仁大镇), Gangou (甘沟镇), Chengchuan (城川镇), Caowu (曹务镇), Leida (雷大镇), Sihe (四河镇), Xixiang (细巷镇), Shuangxian (双岘镇), Zhiping (治平镇), Hongsi (红寺镇), Yuan'an (原安镇)

Townships:

- Siqiao Township(司桥乡), Yuwan Township (余湾乡), Jiahe Township(贾河乡), Shengou Township(深沟乡), Xindian Township(新店乡), Sanhe Township(三合乡), Lingzhi Township(灵芝乡)

=== Huating City ===
Subdistricts:

- Donghua Subdistrict (东华街道)

Towns:

- Donghua (东华镇), Ankou (安口镇), Xihua (西华镇), Maxia (马峡镇), Cedi (策底镇), Shangguan (上关镇), Hexi (河西镇)

Townships:

- Shenyu Township(神峪乡), Shanzhai Township(山寨乡), Yanxia Township (砚峡乡)

Others:

- Shibaozi Development Zone Management Committee(石堡子开发区管委会)

== Jiuquan ==
=== Suzhou District ===
Subdistricts:

- Dongbeijie Subdistrict (东北街街道), Dongnanjie Subdistrict (东南街街道), Gongyeyuan Subdistrict (工业园街道), Xincheng Subdistrict (新城街道), Xibeijie Subdistrict (西北街街道), Xi'nanjie Subdistrict (西南街街道), Yuguanjushenghuojidi Subdistrict (玉管局生活基地街道)

Towns:

- Xidong(西洞镇), Qingshui(清水镇), Zongzhai(总寨镇), Jinfosi(金佛寺镇), Shangba(上坝镇), Sandun(三墩镇), Yinda(银达镇), Xifeng(西峰镇), Quanhu(泉湖镇), Guoyuan(果园镇), Xiaheqing(下河清镇), Huajian(铧尖镇), Dongdong(东洞镇), Fengle(丰乐镇)

Townships:

- Huangnibao Township(黄泥堡乡)

Others:

- State-owned Xiaheqing Farm(国营下河清农场), Jiuquan Economic and Technological Development Zone(酒泉经济技术开发区), Base 10 (十号基地)

=== Jinta County ===
Towns:

- Zhongdong(中东镇), Dingxin(鼎新镇), Jinta(金塔镇), Dongba(东坝镇), Hangtian(航天镇), Dazhuangzi(大庄子镇), Xiba(西坝镇)

Townships:

- Gucheng Township(古城乡), Yangjingziwan Township(羊井子湾乡)

Others:

- Gansu Yasheng Agriculture and Industry Group Co., Ltd.(甘肃亚盛农工商集团有限责任公司), Industrial Park Management Committee(工业园区管委会)

=== Guazhou County ===
Towns:

- Yuanquan(渊泉镇), Liuyuan(柳园镇), Sandaogou(三道沟镇), Nancha(南岔镇), Suoyang(锁阳城镇), Guazhou(瓜州镇), Xihu(西湖镇), Hedong(河东镇), Shuangta(双塔镇)

Ethnic Towns:

- Yaozhanzi Dongxiang Town(腰站子东乡族镇)

Townships:

- Bulongji Township(布隆吉乡), Lianghu Township(梁湖乡)

Ethnic Towns:

- Qidun Huizu Dongxiangzu Township(七墩回族东乡族乡), Guangzhi zangzu Township(广至藏族乡), Shahe Huizu Township (沙河回族乡)

Others:

- State-owned Xiaowan Farm (国营小宛农场)

=== Subei Mongol Autonomous County ===
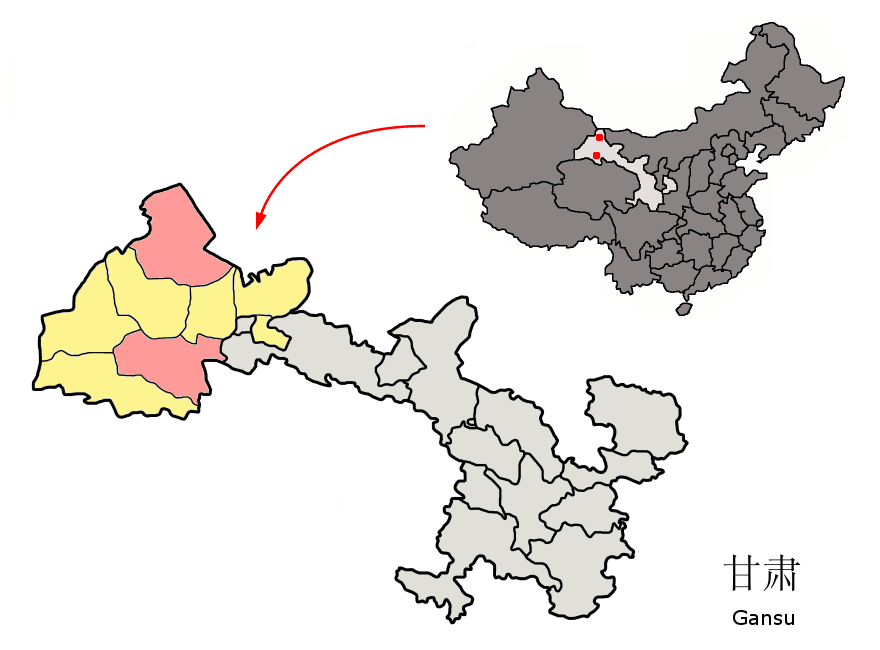
Location of Subei Mongol Autonomous County

Two towns:

- Dangchengwan (党城湾镇) and Mazongshan (马鬃山镇)

Two townships:

- Shibaocheng (石包城乡) and Yanchiwan (盐池湾乡)

=== Aksai Kazakh Autonomous County ===
Towns:

- Hongliuwan(红柳湾镇)

Townships:

- Akeqi Township(阿克旗乡), Alteng Township(阿勒腾乡), Aina Township(阿伊纳乡)

Others:

- Aksai County Industrial Park Management Committee (阿克塞县工业园区管理委员会)

=== Yumen City ===
Subdistricts:

- Xinshiqu Subdistrict (新市区街道)

Towns:

- Yumen(玉门镇), Chijin(赤金镇), Huahai(花海镇), Laojunmiao(老君庙镇), Huangzhawan(黄闸湾镇), Xiaxihao(下西号镇), Liuhe(柳河镇), Changma(昌马镇), Liuhu(柳湖镇), Liudun(六墩镇)

Ethnic Townships:

- Xiaojinwan Dongxiang Township (小金湾东乡族乡), Dushanzi Dongxiang Township (独山子东乡族乡

Others:

- State-owned Horse Drinking Farm(国营饮马农场), State-owned Yellow Flower Farm Dongxiangzu Township(国营黄花农场), Gansu Nongken Yusheng Agricultural Company(甘肃农垦裕盛农业公司), Gansu Provincial Agricultural Reclamation Construction Engineering Company(甘肃省农垦建筑工程公司), Gansu mining area(甘肃矿区)

=== Dunhuang ===
Nine towns:

- Qili (七里镇), Shazhou (沙州镇), Suzhou (肃州镇), Mogao (莫高镇), Zhuanqukou (转渠口镇), Yangguan (阳关镇), Yueyaquan (月牙泉镇), Guojiabao/bu/pu (郭家堡镇), Huangqu (黄渠镇)

Two other areas:

- Guoying Dunhuang Farm (国营敦煌农场), Qinghai Oil Management Office Life Base (青海石油管理局生活基地)

== Qingyang ==
=== Xifeng District ===
Subdistricts:

- Beijie Banshichu Subdistrict (北街办事处街道), Nanjie Banshichu Subdistrict (南街办事处街道), Xijie Banshichu Subdistrict (西街办事处街道)

Towns:

- Xiaojin (肖金镇), Dongzhi (董志镇), Houguanzhai (后官寨镇), Pengyuan (彭原镇镇), Wenquan (温泉镇)

Townships:

- Shishe Township(什社乡), Xiansheng Township(显胜乡)

=== Qingcheng County ===
Towns:

- Qingcheng (庆城镇), Yima (驿马镇), Sanshilipu (三十里铺镇), Maling (马岭镇), Xuanma (玄马镇), Baimapu (白马铺镇), Tongchuan (桐川镇), Chicheng (赤城镇), Gaolou (高楼镇)

Townships:

- Taibailiang Township(太白梁乡), Tuqiao Township(土桥乡), Caikouji Township(蔡口集乡), Nanzhuang Township(南庄乡), Zhaijiahe Township(翟家河乡), Caijiamiao Township(蔡家庙乡)

=== Huan County ===
Towns:

- Huancheng (环城镇), Quzi (曲子镇), Tianshui (甜水镇), Mubo (木钵镇), Hongde (洪德镇), Hedao (合道镇), Hudong (虎洞镇), Maojing (毛井镇), Fanjiachuan (樊家川镇), Chedao (车道镇)

Townships:

- Tianchi Township(天池乡), Yanwu Township(演武乡), Bazhu Township(八珠乡), Gengwan Township(耿湾乡), Qintuanzhuang Township(秦团庄乡), Shancheng Township(山城乡), Nanqiu Township(南湫乡), Luoshanchuan Township(罗山川乡), Xiaonangou Township(小南沟乡), Lujiawan Township(芦家湾乡)

Others:

- Siheyuan Tourism Development Office

=== Huachi County ===
Towns:

- Yuele (悦乐镇), Rouyuan (柔远镇), Yuancheng (元城镇), Nanliang (南梁镇), Chenghao (城壕镇), Wujiao (五蛟镇)

Townships:

- Shangliyuan Township(上里塬乡), Wangzuizi Township(王咀子乡), Baima Township(白马乡), Huai'an Township(怀安乡), Qiaochuan Township(乔川乡), Qiaohe Township(乔河乡), Shanzhuang Township(山庄乡), Linzhen Township(林镇乡), Zifangpan Township(紫坊畔乡)

=== Heshui County ===
Towns:

- Xihuachi (西华池镇), Laocheng (老城镇), Taibai (太白镇), Banqiao (板桥镇), Hejiapan (何家畔镇), Jixian (吉岘镇), Xiaozui (肖咀镇), Gucheng (固城镇)

Townships:

- Duanjiaji Township(段家集乡), Tai'e Township(太莪乡), Dianzi Township(店子乡), Haozuipu Township(蒿咀铺乡)

=== Zhengning County ===
Towns:

- Shanhe (山河镇), Yulinzi (榆林子镇), Gonghe (宫河镇), Yonghe (永和镇), Yongzheng (永正镇), Zhoujia (周家镇), Qiutou (湫头镇), Xipo (西坡镇)

Townships:

- Wuqingyuan Township(五顷原乡), Sanjia Township(三嘉乡)

=== Ning County ===
Towns:

- Xinning (新宁镇), Pingzi (平子镇), Zaosheng (早胜镇), Changqingqiao (长庆桥镇), Hesheng (和盛镇), Xiangle (湘乐镇), Xinzhuang (新庄镇), Panke (盘克镇), Zhongcun (中村镇), Jiaocun (焦村镇), Miqiao (米桥镇), Liangping (良平镇), Taichang (太昌镇), Chunrong (春荣镇)

Townships:

- Nanyi Township(南义乡), Waxie Township(瓦斜乡), Jincun Township(金村乡), Jiuxian Township (九岘乡)

=== Zhenyuan County ===
Towns:

- Chengguan (城关镇), Tunzi (屯字镇), Mengba (孟坝镇), Sancha (三岔镇), Pingquan (平泉镇), Kaibian (开边镇), Taiping (太平镇), Linjing (临泾镇), Xincheng (新城镇), Shangxiao (上肖镇), Xinji (新集镇), Maqu (马渠镇), Miaoqu (庙渠镇)

Townships:

- Nanchuan Township(南川乡), Fangshan Township(方山乡), Yinjiacheng Township(殷家城乡), Wugou Township (武沟乡), Guoyuan Township(郭原乡), Zhongyuan Township (中原乡)

== Dingxi ==
=== Anding District ===
Subdistricts:

- Zhonghualu Subdistrict (中华路街道), Yongdinglu Subdistrict (永定路街道), Futailu Subdistrict (福台路街道)

Towns:

- Fengxiang (凤翔镇), Neiguanying (内官营镇), Cangkou (巉口镇), Chenggouyi (称钩驿镇), Lujiagou (鲁家沟镇), Xigongyi (西巩驿镇), Ningyuan (宁远镇), Lijiabao (李家堡镇), Tuanjie (团结镇), Xiangquan (香泉镇), Fujiachuan (符家川镇), Gejiacha (葛家岔镇)

Townships:

- Bailu Township(白碌乡), Shixiawan Township(石峡湾乡), Xinji Township(新集乡), Qinglanshan Township(青岚山乡), Gaofeng Township(高峰乡), Shiquan Township(石泉乡), Xingyuan Township(杏园乡)

=== Tongwei County ===
Towns:

- Pingxiang (平襄镇), Maying (马营镇), Jichuan (鸡川镇), Bangluo (榜罗镇), Changjiahe (常家河镇), Yigangchuan (义岗川镇), Longyang (陇阳镇), Longshan (陇山镇), Longchuan (陇川镇), Biyu (碧玉镇), Xiangnan (襄南镇), Shichuan (什川镇), Huajialing (华家岭镇), Beichengpu (北城铺镇)

Townships:

- Xinjing Township(新景乡), Lijiadian Township(李家店乡), Disanpu Township(第三铺乡), Sizichuan Township(寺子川乡)

=== Longxi County ===
Towns:

- Gongchang (巩昌镇), Wenfeng (文峰镇), Shouyang (首阳镇), Caizi (菜子镇), Fuxing (福星镇), Tonganyi (通安驿镇), Yuntian (云田镇), Biyan (碧岩镇), Mahe (马河镇), Kezhai (柯寨镇), Shuangquan (双泉镇), Quanjiawan (权家湾镇)

Townships:

- Weiyang Township(渭阳乡), Hongwei Township(宏伟乡), Heping Township(和平乡), Dexing Township(德兴乡), Yongji Township(永吉乡)

=== Weiyuan County ===
Towns:

- Qingyuan (巩昌镇), Lianfeng (文峰镇), Huichuan (首阳镇), Wuzhu (菜子镇), Luyuan (福星镇), Beizhai (通安驿镇), Xinzhai (云田镇), Majiaji (碧岩镇), Shadeyu (马河镇), Qingping (柯寨镇), Qijiamiao (双泉镇), Shangwan (权家湾镇)

Townships:

- Da'an Township(渭阳乡), Qinqi Township(宏伟乡), Xiacheng Township(和平乡), Tianjiahe Township (德兴乡)

=== Lintao County ===
Towns:

- Taoyang (洮阳镇), Balipu (八里铺镇), Xintian (新添镇), Xindian (辛店镇), Taishi (太石镇), Zhongpu (中铺镇), Xiakou (峡口镇), Longmen (龙门镇), Yaodian (窑店镇), Yujing (玉井镇), Yaxiaji (衙下集镇), Nanping (南屏镇)

Townships:

- Hongqi Township(红旗乡), Shangying Township(上营乡), Kangjiaji Township(康家集乡), Zhantan Township (站滩乡), Manwa Township(漫洼乡), Lian'erwan Township(连儿湾乡)

=== Zhang County ===
Towns:

- Wuyang (武阳镇), Sancha (三岔镇), Xinsi (新寺镇), Jinzhong (金钟镇), Yanjing (盐井镇), Panhuqiao (殪虎桥镇), Dacaotan (大草滩镇), Sizu (四族镇), Shichuan (石川镇), Guiqingshan (贵清山镇)

Townships:

- Maquan Township(马泉乡), Wudang Township(武当乡), Dongquan Township(东泉乡)

=== Min County ===
Towns:

- Minyang (岷阳镇), Buma (蒲麻镇), Xizhai (西寨镇), Meichuan (梅川镇), Xijiang (西江镇), Lujing (闾井镇), Shili (十里镇), Chabu (茶埠镇), Zhongzhai (中寨镇), Qingshui (清水镇), Sigou (寺沟镇), Mazichuan (麻子川镇), Weixin (维新镇), Hetuo (禾驮镇), Mawu (马坞镇)

Townships:

- Qinxu Township(秦许乡), Shendu Township(申都乡), Suolong Township(锁龙乡)

== Longnan ==
=== Wudu District ===
Subdistricts:

- Zhongluo Subdistrict (钟楼街道), Jishiba Subdistrict (吉石坝街道), Jiangbei Subdistrict (江北街道), Jiangnan Subdistrict (江南街道)

Towns:

- Chengguan (城关镇), Anhua (安化镇), Dongjiang (东江镇), Liangshui (两水镇), Hanwang (汉王镇), Luotang (洛塘镇), Jiaogong (角弓镇), Majie (马街镇), Sanhe (三河镇), Ganquan (甘泉镇), Yulong (鱼龙镇), Pipa (琵琶镇), Waina (外纳镇), Maying (马营镇), Bolin (柏林镇), Yaozhai (姚寨镇), Foya (佛崖镇), Shimen (石门镇), Wuma (五马镇), Yuhe (裕河镇), Hanlin (汉林镇), Jugan (桔柑镇), Longxing (隆兴镇), Huangping (黄坪镇), Wuku (五库镇), Sancang (三仓镇)

Townships:

- Puchi Township(蒲池乡), Chiba Township(池坝乡), Longba Township(龙坝乡), Longfeng Township(龙凤乡), Yuhuang Township(玉皇乡), Guohe Township(郭河乡), Fengxiang Township(枫相乡), Yuezhao Township(月照乡)

Ethnic Townships:

- Pingya Tibetan Township(坪垭藏族乡), Moba Tibetan Township(磨坝藏族乡)

=== Cheng County ===
Towns:

- Chengguan (城关镇), Huangzhu (黄渚镇), Hongchuan (红川镇), Xiaochuan (小川镇), Zhifang (纸坊镇), Paosha (抛沙镇), Diancun (店村镇), Wangmo (王磨镇), Chenyuan (陈院镇), Shaba (沙坝镇), Huangchen (黄陈镇), Jifeng (鸡峰镇), Suyuan (苏元镇), Suochi (索池镇)

Townships:

- Songping Township(宋坪乡), Erlang Township(二郎乡), Luohe Township(镡河乡)

=== Wen County ===
Towns:

- Chengguan (城关镇), Bikou (碧口镇), Shangde (尚德镇), Zhongzhai (中寨镇), Linjiang (临江镇), Qiaotou (桥头镇), Liping (梨坪镇), Tianchi (天池镇), Baoziba (堡子坝镇), Shifang (石坊镇), Shijiba (石鸡坝镇), Danbao (丹堡镇), Zhongmiao (中庙镇), Fanba (范坝镇)

Townships:

- Liujiaping Township(刘家坪乡), Yulei Township(玉垒乡), Koutouba Township(口头坝乡), Jianshan Township(尖山乡), Sheshu Township(舍书乡)

Ethnic Township:

- Tielou Tibetan Township(铁楼藏族乡)

=== Dangchang County ===
Towns:

- Chengguan (城关镇), Hadapu (哈达铺镇), Lichuan (理川镇), Nanyang (南阳镇), Guanting (官亭镇), Shawan (沙湾镇), Awu (阿坞镇), Nanhe (南河镇), Bali (八力镇), Linjiangpu (临江铺镇), Lianghekou (两河口镇)

Townships:

- Mu'er Township(木耳乡), Pangjia Township(庞家乡), Hejiabao Township(何家堡乡), Jiahe Township(贾河乡), Jiangtai Township(将台乡), Chela Township(车拉乡), Haodi Township(好梯乡), Hanyuan Township(韩院乡), Zhuyuan Township(竹院乡), Xinghua Township(兴化乡), Ganjiangtou Township(甘江头乡), Xinzhai Township(新寨乡), Shizi Township(狮子乡)

Ethnic Townships:

- Xinchengzi Tibetan Township(新城子藏族乡)

=== Kang County ===
Towns:

- Chengguan (城关镇), Pinluo (平洛镇), Dabao (大堡镇), Anmenkou (岸门口镇), Lianghe (两河镇), Changba (长坝镇), Yuntai (云台镇), Yangba (阳坝镇), Wangba (王坝镇), Nianba (碾坝镇), Douba (豆坝镇), Wangguan (望关镇), Dananyu (大南峪镇), Zhoujiaba (周家坝镇), Sitai (寺台镇), Baiyang (白杨镇), Tongqian (铜钱镇), Sanheba (三河坝镇)

Townships:

- Miba Township(迷坝乡), Dianzi Township(店子乡), Taishi Township(太石乡)

=== Xihe County ===
Towns:

- Hanyuan (汉源镇), Changdao (长道镇), Heba (何坝镇), Jiangxi (姜席镇), Shixia (石峡镇), Luoyu (洛峪镇), Xiyu (西峪镇), Mayuan (马元镇), Daqiao (大桥镇), Shili (十里镇), Shibao (石堡镇), Xinglong (兴隆镇), Suhe (苏合镇), Luhe (卢河镇), Shaoyu (稍峪镇), Xigaoshan (西高山镇)

Townships:

- Shajing Township(晒经乡), Haolin Township(蒿林乡), Taishihe Township(太石河乡), Liuxiang Township(六巷乡)

=== Li County ===
Towns:

- Chengguan (城关镇), Yanguan (盐官镇), Shiqiao (石桥镇), Baihe (白河镇), Kuanchuan (宽川镇), Yongxing (永兴镇), Qishan (祁山镇), Honghe (红河镇), Yongping (永坪镇), Zhongba (中坝镇), Luoba (罗坝镇), Leiba (雷坝镇), Yacheng (崖城镇), Taoping (洮坪镇), Longlin (龙林镇), Gucheng (固城镇), Jiangkou (江口镇), Qiushan (湫山镇), Baiguan (白关镇), Qiaotou (桥头镇), Wangba (王坝镇), Tanping (滩坪镇)

Townships:

- Mahe Township(马河乡), Shangping Township(上坪乡), Leiwang Township(雷王乡), Shajin Township(沙金乡), Caoping Township(草坪乡), Xiaoliang Township(肖良乡), Sanyu Township(三峪乡)

=== Hui County ===
Towns:

- Chengguan (城关镇), Fujia (安化镇), Jiangluo (东江镇), Niyang (两水镇), Liulin (汉王镇), Jialing (洛塘镇), Yongning (角弓镇), Yinxingshu (马街镇), Shuiyang (三河镇), Lichuan (甘泉镇), Mayanhe (鱼龙镇), Gaoqiao (琵琶镇), Dahedian (外纳镇)

Townships:

- Yushu Township(蒲池乡), Yuguan Township(池坝乡)

=== Liangdang County ===
Towns:

- Chengguan (城关镇), Zhan'erxiang (站儿巷镇), Xipo (西坡镇), Yangdian (杨店镇), Xianlong (显龙镇), Yunping (云屏镇)

Townships:

- Zuojia Township(左家乡), Yuchi Township(鱼池乡), Xinghua Township(兴化乡), Zhangjia Township(张家乡), Taishan Township(泰山乡), Jindong Township(金洞乡)

== Linxia Hui Autonomous Prefecture ==
=== Linxia City ===
Subdistricts:

- Chengnan Subdistrict (城南街道), Chengbei Subdistrict (城北街道), Dongguan Subdistrict (东关街道), Xiguan Subdistrict (西关街道), Bafang Subdistrict (八坊街道), Hongyuan Subdistrict (红园街道), Dongqu Subdistrict (东区街道)

Towns:

- Chengjiao (城郊镇), Yanhan (枹罕镇), Nanlong (南龙镇), Zheqiao (折桥镇)

=== Linxia County ===
Towns:

- Hanji (韩集镇), Tuqiao (土桥镇), Maji (马集镇), Lianhua (莲花镇), Xinji (新集镇), Yinji (尹集镇), Diaoqi (刁祁镇), Beiyuan (北塬镇), Huangniwan (黄泥湾镇)

Townships:

- Yingtan Township(营滩乡), Zhangzigou Township(掌子沟乡), Manisigou Township(麻尼寺沟乡), Monigou Township(漠泥沟乡), Manlu Township(漫路乡), Yulin Township(榆林乡), Jinggou Township(井沟乡), Potou Township(坡头乡). Qiaosi Township(桥寺乡), Xianfeng Township(先锋乡), Hexi Township(河西乡), Anjiapo Township(安家坡乡), Nanyuan Township(南塬乡), Hongtai Township(红台乡), Lupan Township(路盘乡), Minzhu Township(民主乡)

=== Kangle County ===
Towns:

- Fucheng (附城镇), Suji (苏集镇), Rouge (胭脂镇), Jinggu (景古镇), Lianlu (莲麓镇)

Townships:

- Kangfeng Township(康丰乡), Huguan Township(虎关乡), Ruchuan Township(流川乡), Baiwang Township(白王乡), Basong Township(八松乡), Minglu Township(鸣鹿乡), Badan Township(八丹乡), Shangwan Township(上湾乡). Caotan Township(草滩乡), Wuhu Township(五户乡)

=== Yongjing County ===
Towns:

- Liujiaxia (刘家峡镇), Yanguoxia (盐锅峡镇), Taiji (太极镇), Xihe (西河镇), Sanyuan (三塬镇), Xianyuan (岘塬镇), Chenjing (陈井镇), Sichuan (川城镇), Wangtai (王台镇), Hongquan (红泉镇)

Townships:

- Guanshan Township(关山乡), Xuding Township(徐顶乡), Santiaoxian Township(三条岘乡), Pinggou Township(坪沟乡), Xinsi Township(新寺乡), Xiaoling Township(小岭乡), Yangta Township(杨塔乡)

=== Guanghe County ===
Towns:

- Chengguan (城关镇), Sanjiaji (三甲集镇), Qijiaji (祁家集镇), Zhuangkeji (庄窠集镇), Maijiexiang (买家巷镇), Qijia (齐家镇)

Townships:

- Shuiquan Township(水泉乡), Guanfang Township(官坊乡)

Ethnic Townships:

- Alimatu Dongxiang Township(阿力麻土东乡族乡)

=== Hezheng County ===
Towns:

- Chengguan (城关镇), Sanhe (三合镇), Sanshilipu (三十里铺镇), Maijiaji (马家堡镇), Songming (松鸣镇), Chenjiaji (陈家集镇), Luojiaji (罗家集镇), Xinying (新营镇)

Townships:

- Liangjiasi Township(水泉乡), Bujiazhuang Township(官坊乡), Xinzhuang Township(水泉乡), Dalang Township(官坊乡)

=== Dongxiang Autonomous County ===
Towns:

- Suonan (锁南镇), Daban (达板镇), Hetan (河滩镇), Naleisi (那勒寺镇), Tangwang (唐汪镇), Guoyuan (果园镇), Wangji (汪集镇), Longquan (龙泉镇)

Townships:

- Chuntai Township(春台乡), Liushu Township(柳树乡), Dongyuan Township(东塬乡), Pingzhuang Township(坪庄乡), Baihe Township(百和乡), Guanbu Township(关卜乡), Zhaojiaxiang Township(赵家乡), Wujia Township(五家乡), Yanling Township(沿岭乡), Fengshan Township(风山乡), Chejiawan Township(车家湾乡), Gaoshan Township(高山乡), Dashu Township(大树乡), Beiling Township(北岭乡), Kaolei Township(考勒乡), Dongling Township(董岭乡)

=== Jishishan Baoanzu Dongxiang Salar Autonomous County ===
Towns:

- Chuimatan (吹麻滩镇), Dahejia (大河家镇), Juji (居集镇), Qiecang (癿藏镇)

Townships:

- Liujixiang Township(刘集乡), Shiyuan Township(石塬乡), Liugou Township(柳沟乡), Guanjiachuan Township(关家川乡), Hulinjia Township(胡林家乡), Anji Township(安集乡), Zhaizigou Township(寨子沟乡), Guogan Township(郭干乡), Xuhujia Township(徐扈家乡), Zhongzuiling Township(中咀岭乡), Xiaoguan Township(小关乡), Puchuan Township(铺川乡), Yinchuan Township(银川乡)

== Gannan Tibetan Autonomous Prefecture ==
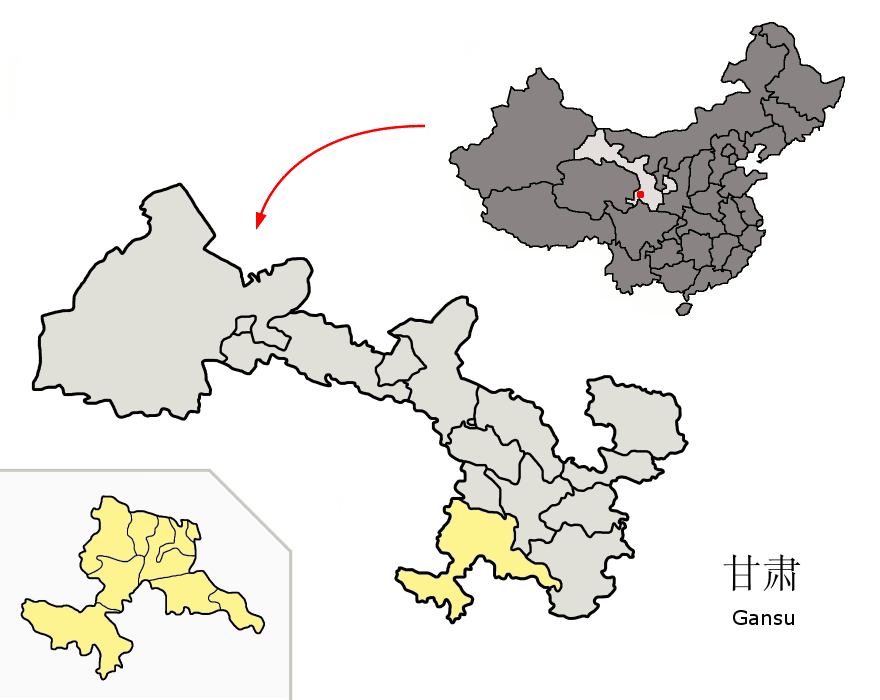
Location of Gannan Tibetan Autonomous Prefecture within Gansu

=== Hezuo City ===
Subdistricts:

- Dangzhou Subdistrict (当周街道), Yiheang Subdistrict (伊合昂街道), Jianmukeer Subdistrict (坚木克尔街道), Tongqin Subdistrict (当周街道)

Towns:

- Nawu (那吾镇), Lexiu (勒秀镇), Zogamanma (佐盖曼玛镇)

Townships:

- Kajman Township (卡加曼乡), Kajiadao (卡加道乡), Zuogedoma (佐盖多玛乡)

=== Lintan County ===
Towns:

- Chengguan (城关镇), Xincheng (新城镇), Yeliguan (冶力关镇), Yangyong (羊永镇), Wangqi (王旗镇), Guzhan (古战镇), Taobin (洮滨镇), Bajiao (八角镇), Liushun (流顺镇), Dianzi (店子镇), Yangsha (羊沙镇)

Townships:

- Shubu Township (术布乡), Zhuoluo Township (卓洛乡), Changchuan Township (长川乡), Sancha Township (三岔乡), Shimen Township (石门乡)

=== Zhuoni County ===
Towns:

- Liulin (柳林镇), Mu'er (木耳镇), Zhagulu (扎古录镇), Ka'erqin (喀尔钦镇), Zangbawa (藏巴哇镇), Nalang (纳浪镇), Taoyan (洮砚镇), Azitan (阿子滩镇), Shenzang (申藏镇), Wanmao (完冒镇), Niba (尼巴镇)

Townships:

- Daogao Township (刀告乡), Qia'gai Township (恰盖乡), Kangduo Township (康多乡)

Ethnic Townships:

- Shaowa Tu Township (勺哇土族乡)

=== Zhouqu County ===
Towns:

- Chengguan (城关镇), Dachuan (大川镇), Fengdie (峰迭镇), Lijie (立节镇), Dongshan (东山镇), Qugaona (曲告纳镇), Boyu (博峪镇), Bacang (巴藏镇), Hanban (憨班镇), Pingding (坪定镇), Goye (果耶镇), Wuping (武坪镇), Dayu (大峪镇), Jiangpan (江盘镇), Gongba (拱坝镇)

Townships:

- Quwa Township (曲瓦乡), Nanyu Township (南峪乡), Baleng Township (八楞乡), Chagang Township (插岗乡)

=== Diebu County ===
Towns:

- Dianga (电尕镇), Yiwa (益哇镇), Wangzang (旺藏镇), Lazikou (腊子口镇), Luoda (洛大镇)

Townships:

- Kaba Township (卡坝乡), Dala Township (达拉乡), Ni'ao Township (尼傲乡), Axia Township (阿夏乡), Duoer Township (多儿乡), Sangba Township (桑坝乡)

=== Maqu County ===
Towns:

- Nima (尼玛镇), Mangima (曼日玛镇), Awancang (阿万仓镇), Qihama (齐哈玛镇), Cerima (采日玛镇), Oula (欧拉镇)

Townships:

- Oulaxiuma Township (欧拉秀玛乡), Muxihe Township (木西合乡)

=== Luqu County ===
Towns:

- Langmusi (郎木寺镇), Maai (玛艾镇), Xicang (西仓镇), Gahai (尕海镇), Shuangcha (双岔镇)

Townships:

- Larenguan Township (拉仁关乡), Ala Township (阿拉乡)

=== Xiahe County ===
Towns:

- Laboleng / Labrang (拉卜楞镇), Wangge'ertang (王格尔塘镇), Amuquhu (阿木去乎镇), Sangke (桑科镇), Ganjia (甘加镇), Madang (麻当镇), Bola (博拉镇), Kecai (科才镇)

Townships:

- Damai Township (达麦乡), Qu'ao Township (曲奥乡), Tangga'ang Township (唐尕昂乡), Zhayou Township (扎油乡), Jicang Township (吉仓乡)

Other areas:

- Xiahe County Seed Station (夏河县种子站), Xiahe County Jisi General Station (夏河县机饲总站), Xiahe County Sangke Sheep Farm (夏河县桑科种羊场)
