= Yanbei =

Yanbei may refer to these places in China:

- Yanbei, Jiangxi, a town in Yongfeng County, Jiangxi
- Yanbei Subdistrict, Chaoyang City, Liaoning
- Yanbei Subdistrict, Lanzhou, Gansu
- Yanbei Subdistrict, Qihe County, Shandong
- Yanbei Subdistrict, Yong'an, Fujian
