= Donggang =

Donggang may refer to:

== Mainland China ==
- Donggang District (东港区), in Rizhao, Shandong
- Donggang, Liaoning (东港市), county-level city in Dandong, Liaoning

Towns

Written as "东港镇":

- Donggang, Huilai County, in Huilai County, Guangdong
- Donggang, Qinhuangdao, in Haigang District, Qinhuangdao, Hebei
- Donggang, Wuxi, in Xishan District, Wuxi, Jiangsu

Written as "东岗镇":

- Donggang, Linzhou, Henan, in Linzhou City, Henan
- Donggang, Fusong County, in Fusong County, Jilin

=== Subdistricts ===
- Donggang Subdistrict in Chengguan District, Lanzhou, Gansu

== Taiwan ==
- Donggang, Pingtung (東港鎮), town in west-central Pingtung County, Taiwan
- Donggang River (Taiwan) (東港溪), river flowing through Pingtung County

== South Korea ==
- Donggang (South Korea), a river flowing through the Gangwon-do district, a tributary of the South Hangang River

== See also ==
- Donggong (disambiguation)
