= Donggong =

Donggong may refer to:

- Donggong, Hubei (东巩), a town in Nanzhang County, Hubei, China
- Donggong 429-class floating pile driver, a class of auxiliary ship of China's People's Liberation Army Navy
- Donggong (東宮), an informal term for Taizi, or Crown Prince in Chinese history
- Goodbye My Princess (東宮), a 2019 Chinese TV series

== See also ==
- Donggang (disambiguation)
