= Gongxingdun Subdistrict =

Gongxingdun Subdistrict 拱星墩街道
- Subdistrict
- Location in Gansu
- Coordinates: 36.04296°N 103.89808°E
- Country: People's Republic of China
- Province: Gansu
- Prefecture-level city: Lanzhou
- District: Chengguan District

Area
  - Total: 3.18 km^{2} (1.23 sq mi)

Population (2010)
  - Total: 85,634
  - Density: 26,900/km^{2} (69,700/sq mi)
- Time zone: UTC+8 (China Standard)

Gongxingdun Subdistrict (Chinese: 拱星墩街道; pinyin: Gǒngxīngdūn Jiēdào) is a subdistrict of Chengguan District, Lanzhou, Gansu Province, People's Republic of China, located 7 km (4.3 mi) from Lanzhou's centre. In 2010 it had a population of 85,634. It is served by Gongxingdun station of the Lanzhou Metro.

== History ==
The subdistrict was preceded by Gongxingdun township, founded in 1949. In 1962 it was changed into a commune, and in 1983 back to a township. In 2005 the current Gongxingdun Subdistrict was established.

== Administrative divisions ==
As of 2020, it administers the following:

- Gongxingdunhou Street Community (拱星墩后街社区)
- Wulipuxi Community (五里铺西社区)
- Duanjiatandong Community (段家滩东社区)
- Duanjiatanxi Community (段家滩西社区)
- Donggangdong Road Community (东岗东路社区)
- Wulipudong Community (五里铺东社区)
- Wulipu Village (五里铺村)
- Duanjiatan Village (段家滩村)
- Fanjiawan Village (范家湾村)
- Gongxingdun Village

== See also ==
- List of township-level divisions of Gansu
- Gongxingdun Airport
