= Zhongchuan =

Zhongchuan (Chinese: 中川; pinyin: Zhōngchuān; lit. 'middle of the plain') may refer to the following locations in China:

- Lanzhou Zhongchuan International Airport, Lanzhou, Gansu Province
- Zhongchuan, Lanzhou, a town of Lanzhou New Area, Gansu
- Zhongchuan, Huining, a town of Huining County, Gansu
- Zhongchuan Township, a township of Minhe Hui and Tu Autonomous County
- Zhongchuan village in Wushan County, Gansu
- Zhongchuan village in Hui County, Gansu
- Zhongchuan village in Li County, Gansu
- Zhongchuan village in Yongding District, Longyan
