= Gongxingdun Airport =

Former airport of Lanzhou, Gansu, China (193X–1970)

Gongxingdun Airport Lanzhou Donggang Airport 拱星敦机场 兰州东岗机场
- IATA: LHW; ICAO: ZLLL

Summary
- Airport type: Defunct
- Serves: Lanzhou
- Location: Gongxingdun, Chengguan, Lanzhou, Gansu, China
- Closed: 26 July 1970
- Coordinates: 36.03712°N 103.88809°E
- Interactive map of Gongxingdun Airport; Lanzhou Donggang Airport

Runways
Direction	Length		Surface
Direction	ft	m	Surface
	5,900	1,800	Concrete (Closed)

Gongxingdun Airport (IATA: LHW, ICAO: ZLLL), also called Lanzhou Donggang Airport, was an airport in Gongxingdun township, Chengguan District, Lanzhou, the capital of Northwest China's Gansu province. It was the city's main airport until it was replaced by the newly opened Lanzhou Zhongchuan International Airport on 26 July 1970.

== History ==
A site was selected, about two km (1.2 mi) from the center of Lanzhou, by the Eurasia Aviation Corporation, and the airport opened in the early 1930s. The airport was built with a gravel runway of 1,580 metres (5,180 ft) long and 30 metres (98 ft) wide.

During the Second Sino-Japanese War, it was under control of the 7th Fighter Aviation Division. The airport was also an important landing site for Soviet aircraft sending aid to China during the war, and Chinese fighter ace and war hero Gao Zhihang led his pilots of the 4th Pursuit Group in November 1937 to receive new Polikarpov I-16 fighter here, and leading the group back to the eastern front to resume combat operations against the imperial Japanese approach to Nanjing .

On November 5, 1937, the airport was bombed by the Japanese, and on 4 December of the same year again, during which 2 died and 4 where wounded. In the following months, the airport was under attack several times more, and air battles took place over Lanzhou through 1938 and 1939 as the Japanese were persistent to capture Lanzhou. However suffering large losses of at least 15 planes in one day, they decided to give up on taking Lanzhou.

In 1937, a transport plane (number 1602) carrying 38 people crash landed without casualties at Gongxingdun Airport.

In 1949 the airport was fully renovated with many facilities added. However smog and tall buildings complicated landing at the airport, which required pilot aids to be added. By 1960 the runway was paved and lengthened to 1800 meters and a width of 30 meters. In 1957, the Civil Aviation Administration of China decided that the airport's location was too restrictive for the aviation needs of Lanzhou and chose a new site for Lanzhou's main airport at Zhongchuan. By 1970, Zhongchuan Airport was inaugurated and flights moved to there.

In 1976, the Gansu Aviation Sports School became based at Gongxingdun Airport.

Somewhere in the next decades the airport was demolished, however the PLA Air Force still owns the site in Jiaojiawan subdistrict, which is now used for staff housing and offices.

== Former airlines and destinations ==
Airlines	Destinations
C.A.A.C Airlines	Beijing/Nanyuan, Beijing/Capital, Chengdu, Hohhot, Jiuquan, Shanghai/Longhua, Shanghai/Jiangwan, Shanghai/Hongqiao, Taiyuan, Xi'an/Xiguan, Xining, Yinchuan, Zhengzhou/Dongjiao
Eurasian Aviation Corporation	Hong Kong, Shanghai, Ürümqi
