= Jiaojiawan Subdistrict =

Coordinates: 36.04296°N 103.89808°E

Jiaojiawan subdistrict 焦家湾街道
- Subdistrict
- Interactive map of Jiaojiawan subdistrict
- Country: China
- Province: Gansu
- Prefecture: Lanzhou
- District: Chengguan District

Population
  - Total: 34,105
- Time zone: UTC+8 (China Standard Time)

Jiaojiawan subdistrict is a subdistrict of Chengguan District, Lanzhou, Gansu Province, People's Republic of China.

The former Gongxingdun Airport is entirely in Jiaojiawan subdistrict, it is now the Lanzhou PLA Air Force housing district. It is also the site of the Gansu branch of the National Fitness Center.

== Communities ==
Jiaojiawan subdistrict governs four communities:

- Gongxingdun
- Jiaojiawan
- Jiayuguan East Road
- Jiaojiawan South Road

== Schools ==
- Lanzhou Number 37 Middle School
- Gansu Sports School
- Gongxingdun Primary School
