= Yannan Subdistrict, Lanzhou =

Yannan Subdistrict 雁南街道
- Subdistrict
- Location in Gansu
- Coordinates: 36°3′40″N 103°52′36″E
- Country: People's Republic of China
- Province: Gansu
- Prefecture-level city: Lanzhou
- District: Chengguan District
- Time zone: UTC+8 (China Standard)

Yannan Subdistrict (Chinese: 雁南街道; pinyin: Yànnán Jiēdào) is a subdistrict in Chengguan District, Lanzhou, Gansu, China. As of 2020, it administers the following seven residential neighborhoods, and four villages:

== Neighborhoods ==
- Yanning Road Community (雁宁路社区)
- Tanjianzi Community (滩尖子社区)
- Dayantan Community (大雁滩社区)
- Shawahe Community (沙洼河社区)
- Zhangsutan Community (张苏滩社区)
- Tianqing Jiayuan Community (天庆嘉园社区)
- Nanhe Community (南河社区)

== Villages ==
- Zhangsutan Village (张苏滩村)
- Tanjianzi Village (滩尖子村)
- Dayantan Village (大雁滩村)
- Shawahe Village (沙洼河村)

== See also ==
- List of township-level divisions of Gansu
