= Caotan =

- Town
- 草滩镇
- Interactive map of Caotan
- Country: China
- Province: Gansu
- Prefecture-level city: Baiyin
- County: Huining
- Highest elevation: 2,200 m (7,200 ft)
- Lowest elevation: 1,600 m (5,200 ft)

Population (2019)
  - Total: 13,180

Caotan is a town of Huining County, Gansu, China. It has a population of 13,180 as of 2019 and governs over 7 villages. The town is poor and most residents make a living by farming corn, wheat, potato and shallot.
