= Qilihe, Lanzhou =

Coordinates: 36°02′0″N 103°48′0″E

Qilihe 七里河区
- District
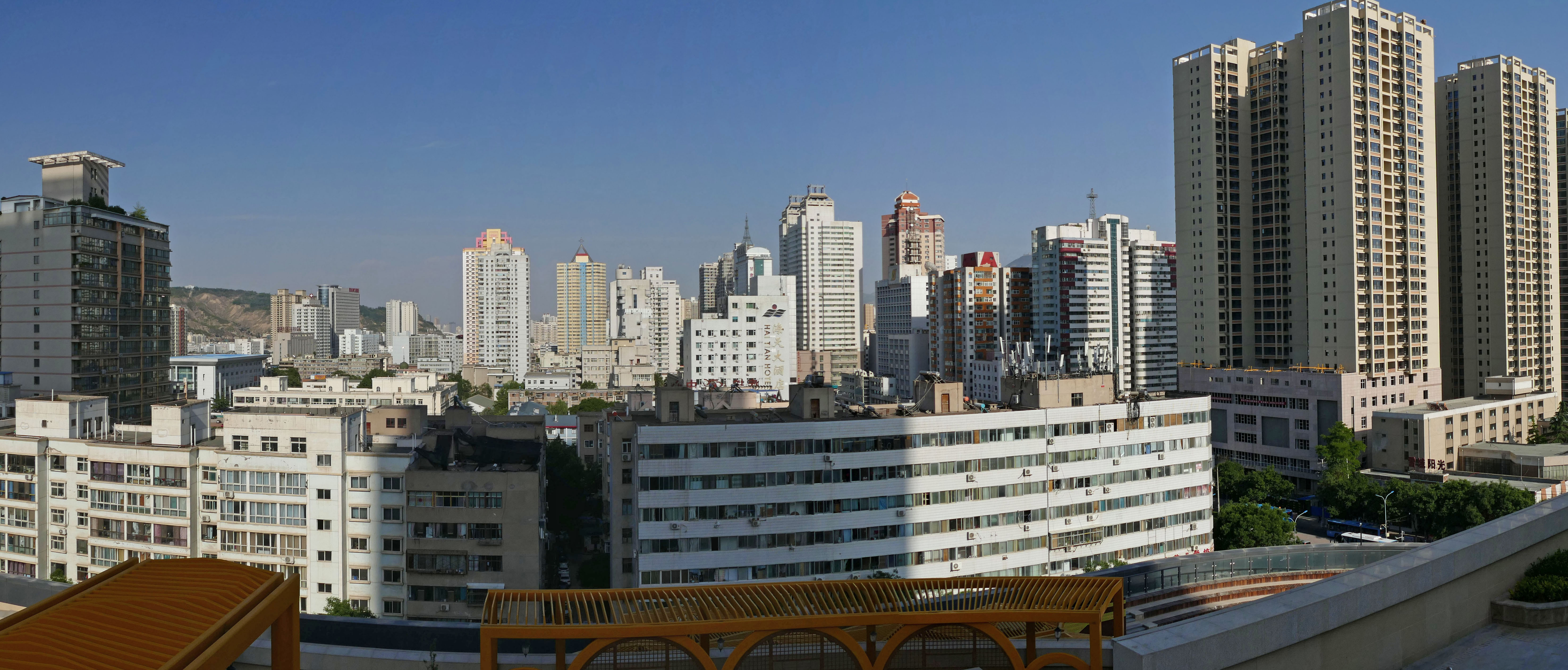
- Qilihe District skyline

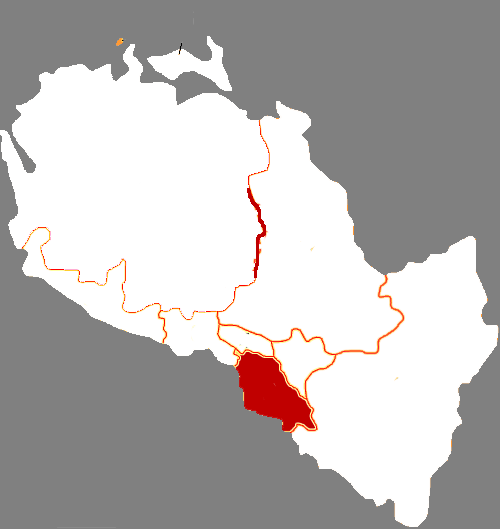
- Location in Lanzhou

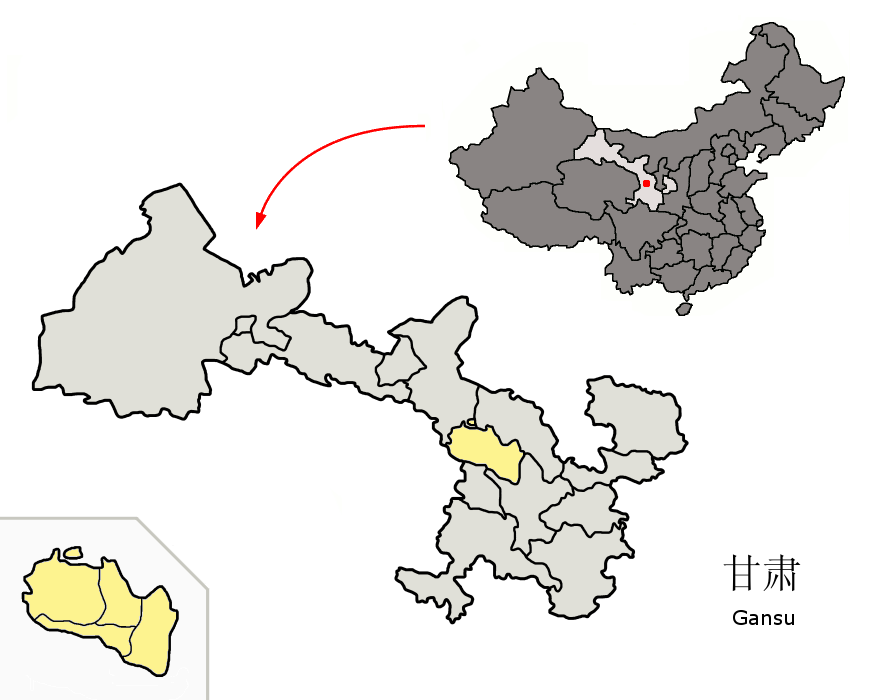
- Lanzhou in Gansu
- Country: China
- Province: Gansu
- Prefecture-level city: Lanzhou

Area
  - District: 397 km^{2} (153 sq mi)
  - Urban: 25 km^{2} (9.7 sq mi)

Population (2018)
  - District: 635,000
  - Density: 1,600/km^{2} (4,140/sq mi)
- Time zone: UTC+8 (China Standard)
- Postal code: 730050
- Website: qlhq.lanzhou.gov.cn

Qilihe District (Chinese: 七里河区; pinyin: Qīlǐhé Qū) is one of 5 districts of the prefecture-level city of Lanzhou, the capital of Gansu Province, Northwest China. It is one of 17 administrative districts of Gansu.

== Geography ==
Qilihe District is located entirely on the southern bank of the Yellow River, and includes part of Lanzhou's main urban area, being the second most populous district of Lanzhou. In the east, it borders on Chengguan District (which includes the downtown Lanzhou), and in the west, on Xigu District. The district also includes some sparsely populated arid highlands south of the river, stretching for several tens of kilometers up to the border of the Dingxi prefecture-level city.

== History ==
The area of Qilihe district has been inhabited since the Neolithic era. In 1083, a fort was built at present A'gan Town. In the 1940 it was part of Gaolan County, and two towns were located at the present urban centre, Huaqiao (握桥镇) in the east and Bingping (丙屏镇) in the west. In 1949, these two towns became the eighth and ninth districts of Lanzhou, which were renamed fourth and eighth district respectively in 1953. In 1955, the fourth district became Qilihe District. The name of the district is derived from a stream (hé), located seven (qī) li from downtown Lanzhou, and between the two former towns.

== Demographics ==
In 2018, the district had a population of 635,000, of which about 100,000 minority population (Hui, Dongxiang, Uyghur, Mongolian, and Tibetan). Most of the minority population of Lanzhou is concentrated in Qilihe.

== Transport ==
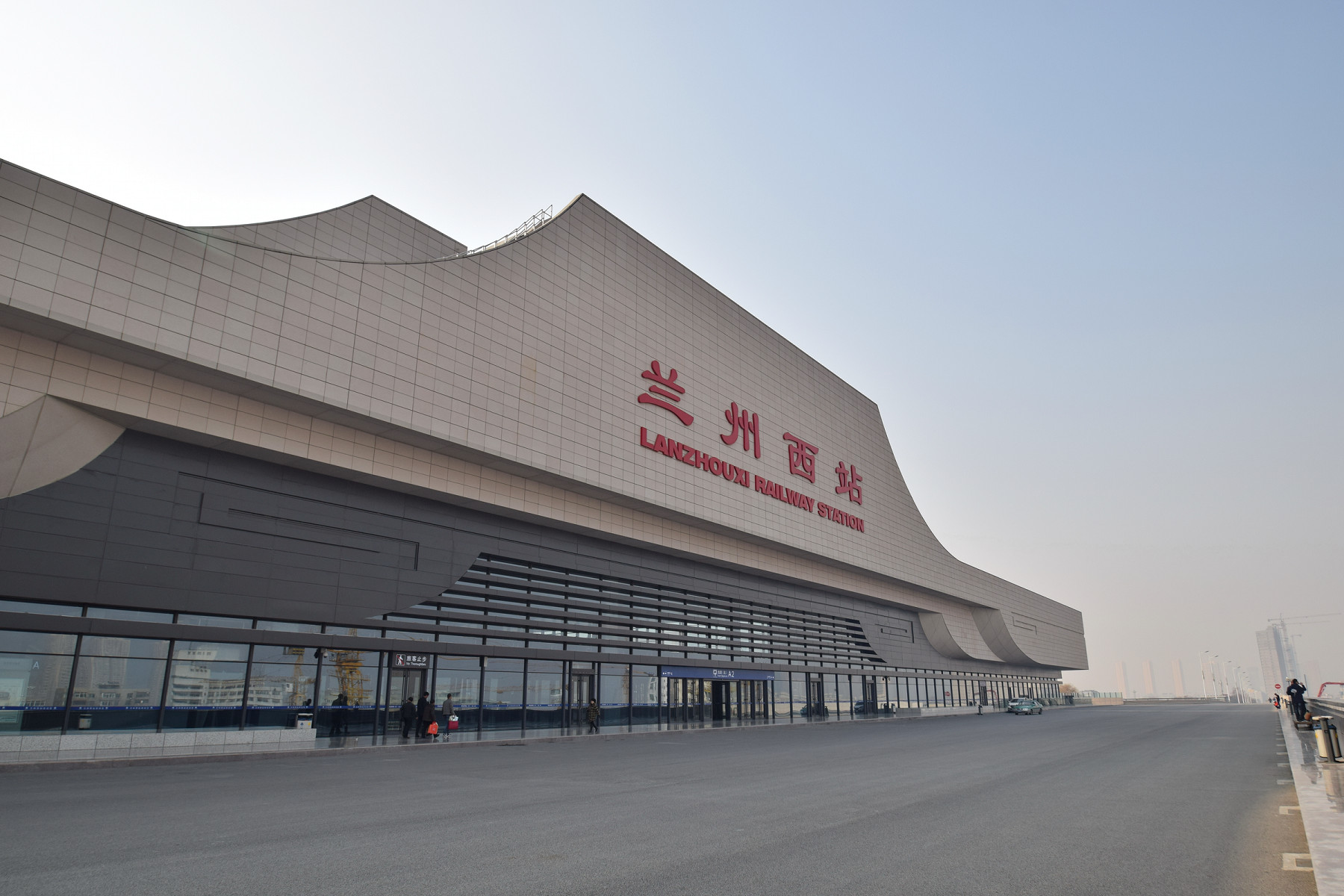
Lanzhou West Railway Station

Lanzhou's biggest railway station, Lanzhou West railway station is located in Qilihe district. G212 starts in Qilihe and G109 passes through Qilihe, G75 Lanzhou–Haikou Expressway begins in Qilihe District. Long-distance buses depart from Lanzhou West Bus Station. Line 1 and Line 2 of the Lanzhou Metro pass through the core of Qilihe.

== Tourism ==
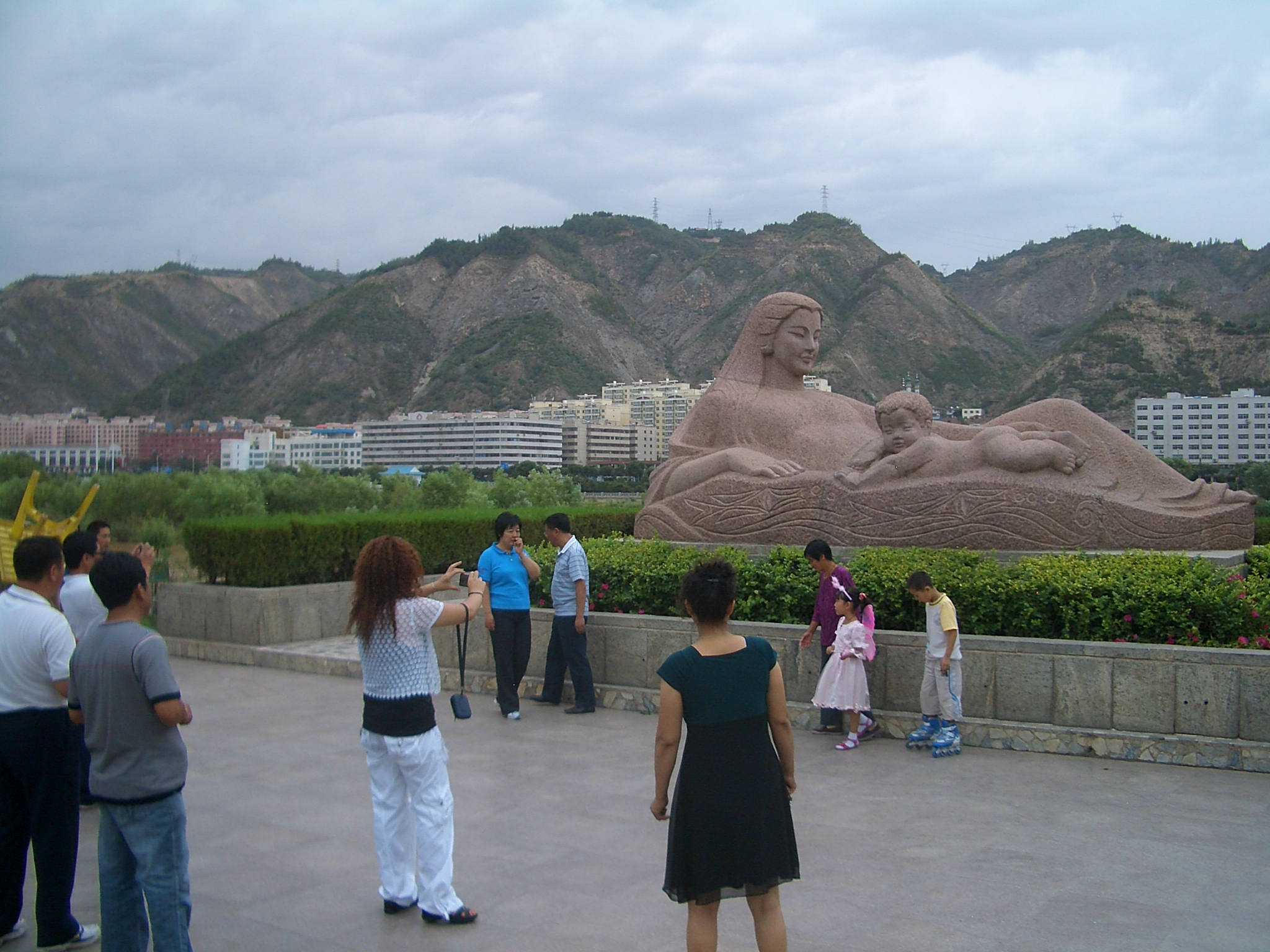
Mother River sculpture in Qilihe District

The district's sights include the waterfront Xihu Park (西湖公园), with a good view of the Yellow River and the well-known "Mother River" statue, symbolizing the role of the Yellow River for Chinese civilization. The monument is considered the symbol of Lanzhou. Gansu Provincial Museum is near the centre of Qilihe district. An amusement park is located in the northwest of Qilihe. Lanzhou's sole aquarium and Lanzhou Workers' Palace of Culture are also located in the district.

== Economy ==
Qilihe downtown shopping center

The local economy mainly depended on state-owned enterprises, but service industry and commerce has become of greater importance.

== Education ==
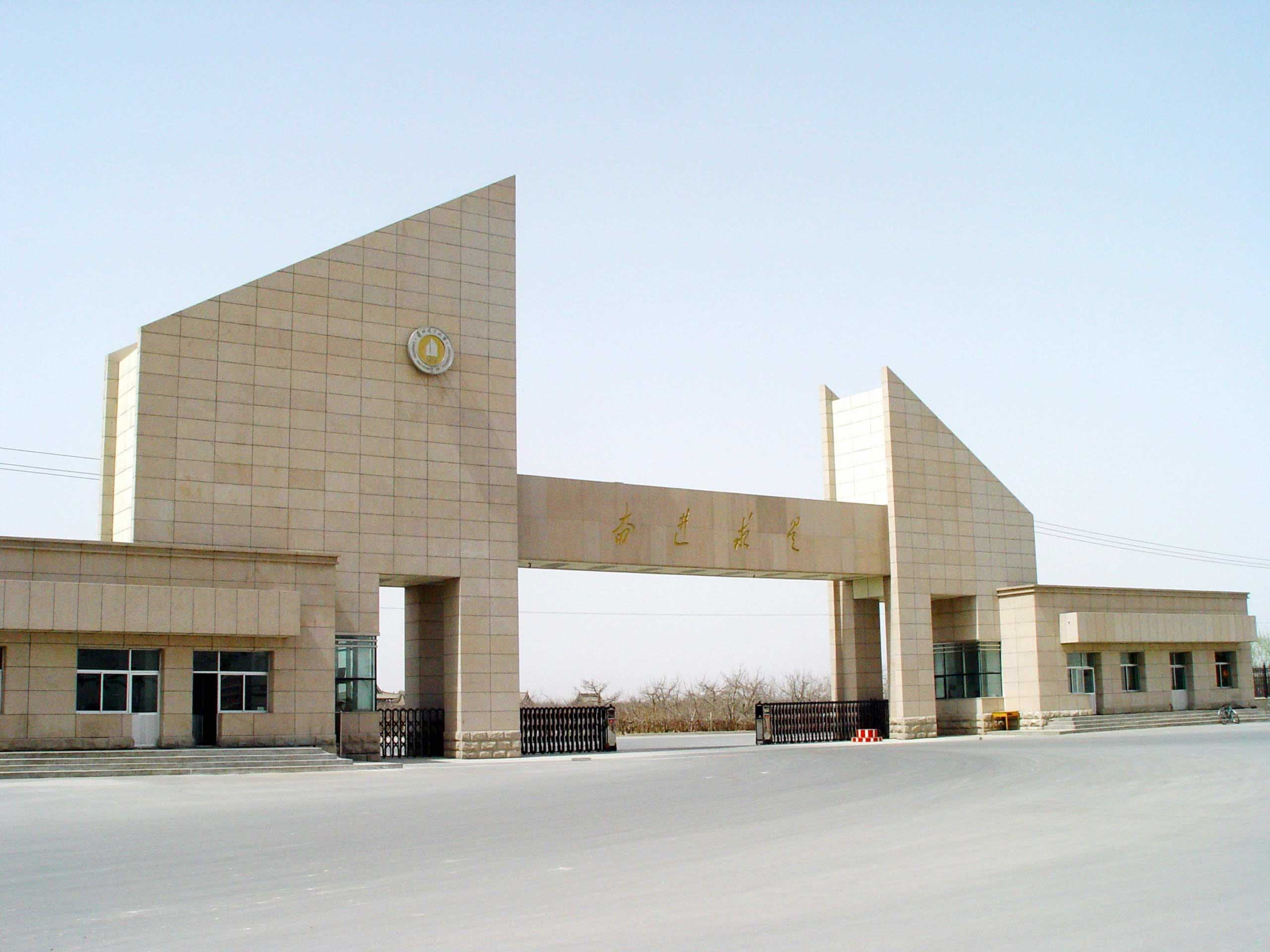
Lanzhou University of Technology new campus

Both of Lanzhou University of Technology's campuses are in Qilihe District.

== Healthcare ==
- Lanzhou General Military Hospital
- Gansu Chinese Medicine Hospital
- Lanshi Hospital
- First People's Hospital of Lanzhou

== Administrative divisions ==
The district administers 9 subdistricts, 5 towns, 1 township, 59 administrative villages and 78 residential communities.

Subdistricts

- Xiyuan Subdistrict (西园街道)
- Xihu Subdistrict (西湖街道)
- Jianlan Road Subdistrict(建兰路街道)
- Dunhuang Road Subdistrict (敦煌路街道)
- Xizhan Subdistrict (西站街道)
- Yanjiaping Subdistrict (晏家坪街道)
- Gongjiawan Subdistrict (龚家湾街道)
- Tumendun Subdistrict (土门墩街道)
- Xiuchuan Subdistrict (秀川街道)

Towns

- A'gan Town (阿干镇)
- Xiguoyuan Town (西果园镇)
- Bali Town (八里镇)
- Pengjiaping Town (彭家坪镇)
- Huangyu Town (黄峪镇) -it is upgraded from Township.

Townships

- Weiling Township (魏岭乡)

== See also ==
- List of administrative divisions of Gansu
