= Huining County =

Huining County 会宁县
- County
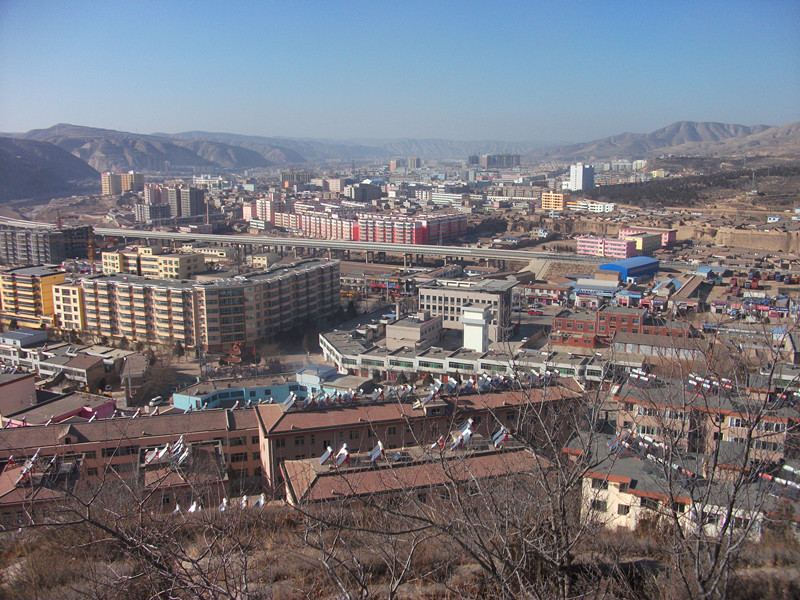
- View of Huining from the south

- Location of the seat in Gansu
- Coordinates: 35°41′35″N 105°02′48″E
- Country: China
- Province: Gansu
- Prefecture-level city: Baiyin
- County seat: Huishi

Area
  - Total: 6,439 km^{2} (2,486 sq mi)

Population (2018)
  - Total: 543,900
  - Density: 84.47/km^{2} (218.8/sq mi)
- Time zone: UTC+8 (China Standard)
- Postal code: 730700
- Website: www.huining.gov.cn

Huining County (simplified Chinese: 会宁县; traditional Chinese: 會寧縣; pinyin: Huìníng Xiàn) is a county in the east of Gansu Province, bordering Ningxia to the east. It is under the administration of Baiyin City and located at its southeast end. Its postal code is 730700, and its population in 1999 was 569,599 people.

In October 1936, the Red Army met in Huining to celebrate the end of the Long March.

== Administrative divisions ==
Huining County is divided to 24 towns, 3 townships and 1 ethnic township.

Towns

- Huishi (会师镇)
- Guochengyi (郭城驿镇)
- Hepan (河畔镇)
- Touzhaizi (头寨子镇)
- Taipingdian (太平店镇)
- Gangouyi (甘沟驿镇)
- Houjiachuan (侯家川镇)
- Chaijiamen (柴家门镇)
- Hanjiacha (汉家岔镇)
- Liujiazhaizi (刘家寨子镇)
- Baicaoyuan (白草塬镇)
- Dagou (大沟镇)
- Sifangwu (四房吴镇)
- Zhongchuan (中川镇)
- Laojunpo (老君坡镇)
- Pingtouchuan (平头川镇)
- Dingjiagou (丁家沟镇)
- Yangyaji (杨崖集镇)
- Zhaijiasuo (翟家所镇)
- Hanjiaji (韩家集镇)
- Tumenxia (土门岘镇)
- Xinyuan (新塬镇)
- Caotan (草滩镇)
- Xinzhuang (新庄镇)

Townships

- Dangjiaxian Township (党家岘乡)
- Baliwan Township (八里湾乡)
- Tugaoshan Township (土高山乡)

Ethnic townships

- Xintianbao Hui Ethnic Township (新添堡回族乡)

== Climate ==
Climate data for Huining, elevation 1,739 m (5,705 ft), (1991–2020 normals, extremes 1981–2010)
Month	Jan	Feb	Mar	Apr	May	Jun	Jul	Aug	Sep	Oct	Nov	Dec	Year
Record high °C (°F)	14.9 (58.8)	20.5 (68.9)	27.1 (80.8)	30.8 (87.4)	31.1 (88.0)	33.3 (91.9)	35.9 (96.6)	35.7 (96.3)	32.3 (90.1)	24.2 (75.6)	20.5 (68.9)	15.2 (59.4)	35.9 (96.6)
Mean daily maximum °C (°F)	1.5 (34.7)	5.3 (41.5)	11.4 (52.5)	17.8 (64.0)	22.1 (71.8)	25.7 (78.3)	27.2 (81.0)	25.9 (78.6)	20.7 (69.3)	15.1 (59.2)	8.9 (48.0)	3.1 (37.6)	15.4 (59.7)
Daily mean °C (°F)	−6.5 (20.3)	−2.3 (27.9)	3.9 (39.0)	10.1 (50.2)	14.8 (58.6)	18.8 (65.8)	20.7 (69.3)	19.5 (67.1)	14.6 (58.3)	8.6 (47.5)	1.4 (34.5)	−5.0 (23.0)	8.2 (46.8)
Mean daily minimum °C (°F)	−12.4 (9.7)	−8.0 (17.6)	−1.9 (28.6)	3.7 (38.7)	8.4 (47.1)	12.6 (54.7)	15.2 (59.4)	14.3 (57.7)	10.0 (50.0)	3.8 (38.8)	−3.8 (25.2)	−10.7 (12.7)	2.6 (36.7)
Record low °C (°F)	−26.5 (−15.7)	−23.3 (−9.9)	−13.9 (7.0)	−7.7 (18.1)	−3.3 (26.1)	3.0 (37.4)	7.3 (45.1)	6.0 (42.8)	−1.1 (30.0)	−9.7 (14.5)	−19.2 (−2.6)	−22.1 (−7.8)	−26.5 (−15.7)
Average precipitation mm (inches)	4.1 (0.16)	5.3 (0.21)	9.4 (0.37)	23.9 (0.94)	44.4 (1.75)	49.5 (1.95)	74.3 (2.93)	78.1 (3.07)	46.0 (1.81)	27.3 (1.07)	6.2 (0.24)	1.4 (0.06)	369.9 (14.56)
Average precipitation days (≥ 0.1 mm)	4.7	4.0	5.1	6.5	9.0	9.5	11.2	10.4	10.7	8.2	4.4	2.2	85.9
Average snowy days	8.0	6.8	5.6	1.8	0.2	0	0	0	0	1.5	4.3	4.7	32.9
Average relative humidity (%)	62	60	54	50	52	58	65	68	73	71	67	61	62
Mean monthly sunshine hours	183.6	175.0	207.2	221.2	235.5	229.3	221.3	210.5	154.6	162.0	173.5	190.7	2,364.4
Percentage possible sunshine	59	56	56	56	54	53	50	51	42	47	57	63	54
Source: China Meteorological Administration

== Transport ==
- China National Highway 312

== See also ==
- List of administrative divisions of Gansu
