= Yongfeng County =

Yongfeng County 永丰县 Yungfeng
- County
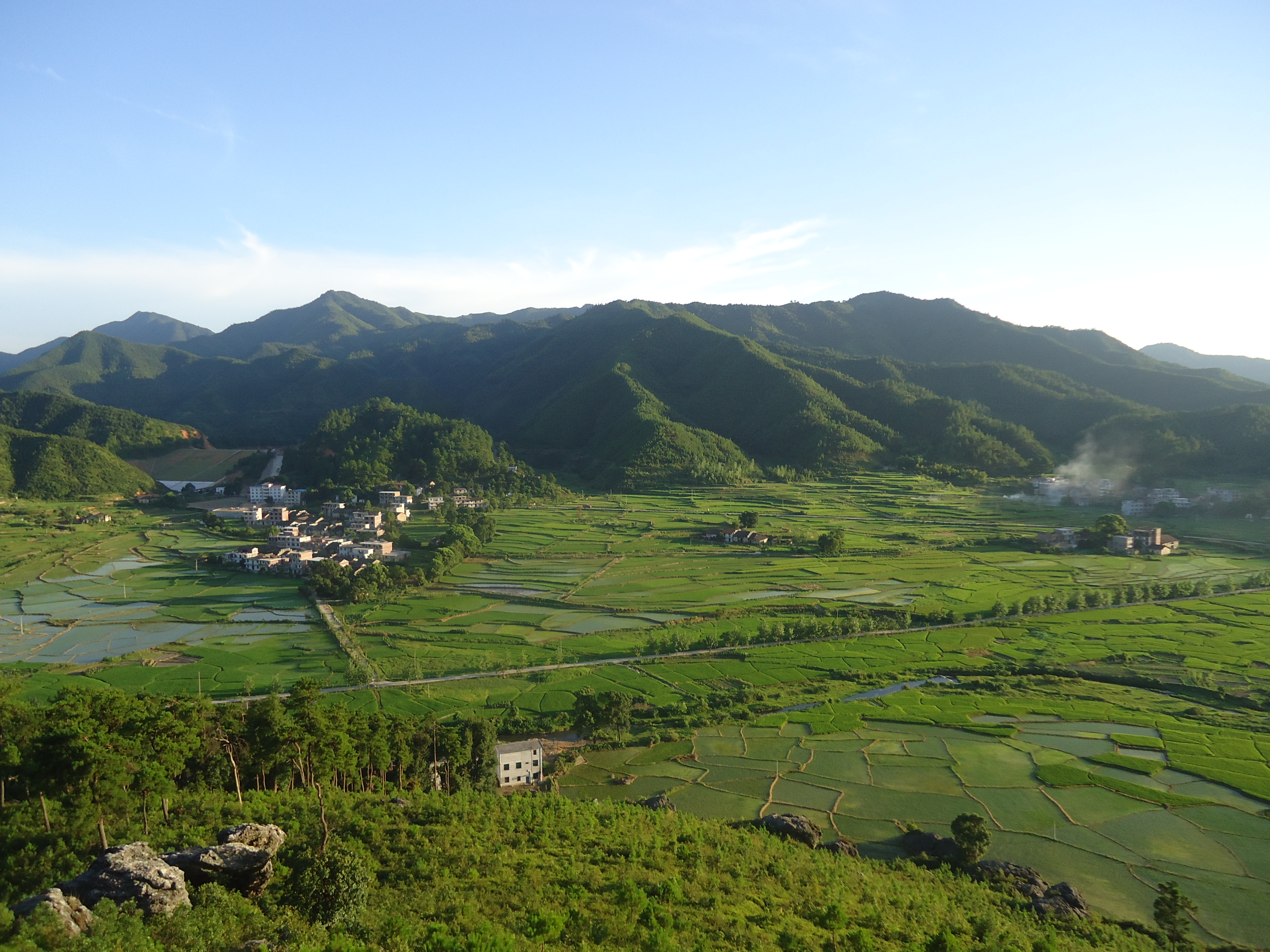

- Location of Yongfeng County (red) within Ji'an City (gold) and Jiangxi
- Coordinates: 27°19′01″N 115°25′19″E
- Country: People's Republic of China
- Province: Jiangxi
- Prefecture-level city: Ji'an

Area
  - Land: 2,695 km^{2} (1,041 sq mi)

Population (2019)
  - Total: 480,000
  - Density: 180/km^{2} (460/sq mi)
- Time zone: UTC+8 (China Standard)
- Postal code: 331500
- Website: www.jxyongfeng.gov.cn

Yongfeng County (simplified Chinese: 永丰县; traditional Chinese: 永豐縣; pinyin: Yǒngfēng Xiàn) is a county of central Jiangxi province, People's Republic of China. It is under the jurisdiction of the prefecture-level city of Ji'an.

== Administration ==
As of 2016, Yongfeng County was made up of 8 towns, 13 townships, and 3 other areas.

8 Towns

- Enjiang (恩江镇)
- Kengtian (坑田镇)
- Yanbei (沿陂镇)
- Guxian (古县镇)
- Yaotian (瑶田镇)
- Tengtian (藤田镇)
- Shima (石马镇)
- Shaxi (沙溪镇)

12 Townships

- Zuolong (佐龙乡)
- Bajiang (八江乡)
- Tancheng (潭城乡)
- Lugang (鹿冈乡)
- Qidu (七都乡)
- Taotang (陶塘乡)
- Zhongcun (中村乡)
- Shangxi (上溪乡)
- Tantou (潭头乡)
- Sanfang (三坊乡)
- Shanggu (上固乡)
- Junbu (君埠乡)

1 Ethnic Township

- She Longgang (龙冈畲族乡)

== Demographics ==
The population of the district was 394,356 in 1999.

== Climate ==
Climate data for Yongfeng, elevation 86 m (282 ft), (1991–2020 normals, extremes 1981–present)
Month	Jan	Feb	Mar	Apr	May	Jun	Jul	Aug	Sep	Oct	Nov	Dec	Year
Record high °C (°F)	27.8 (82.0)	31.0 (87.8)	33.8 (92.8)	35.9 (96.6)	36.6 (97.9)	38.5 (101.3)	41.7 (107.1)	41.3 (106.3)	38.5 (101.3)	36.9 (98.4)	34.4 (93.9)	26.6 (79.9)	41.7 (107.1)
Mean daily maximum °C (°F)	10.6 (51.1)	13.7 (56.7)	17.4 (63.3)	24.0 (75.2)	28.4 (83.1)	31.0 (87.8)	34.7 (94.5)	34.0 (93.2)	30.5 (86.9)	25.6 (78.1)	19.6 (67.3)	13.4 (56.1)	23.6 (74.4)
Daily mean °C (°F)	6.3 (43.3)	8.9 (48.0)	12.6 (54.7)	18.8 (65.8)	23.2 (73.8)	26.3 (79.3)	29.3 (84.7)	28.5 (83.3)	25.0 (77.0)	19.7 (67.5)	13.9 (57.0)	8.1 (46.6)	18.4 (65.1)
Mean daily minimum °C (°F)	3.4 (38.1)	5.7 (42.3)	9.4 (48.9)	15.0 (59.0)	19.6 (67.3)	22.9 (73.2)	25.1 (77.2)	24.7 (76.5)	21.3 (70.3)	15.6 (60.1)	10.0 (50.0)	4.5 (40.1)	14.8 (58.6)
Record low °C (°F)	−6.0 (21.2)	−7.2 (19.0)	−3.0 (26.6)	2.6 (36.7)	10.2 (50.4)	13.7 (56.7)	18.8 (65.8)	19.6 (67.3)	12.9 (55.2)	3.6 (38.5)	−2.2 (28.0)	−10.0 (14.0)	−10.0 (14.0)
Average precipitation mm (inches)	83.4 (3.28)	102.2 (4.02)	198.9 (7.83)	208.3 (8.20)	231.4 (9.11)	297.6 (11.72)	170.0 (6.69)	158.7 (6.25)	79.7 (3.14)	57.2 (2.25)	90.5 (3.56)	63.8 (2.51)	1,741.7 (68.56)
Average precipitation days (≥ 0.1 mm)	14.0	14.4	19.1	18.3	16.8	17.3	12.2	12.7	8.2	7.9	10.6	10.5	162
Average snowy days	2.3	1.1	0.2	0	0	0	0	0	0	0	0	0.6	4.2
Average relative humidity (%)	83	82	84	82	82	82	75	79	80	78	80	80	81
Mean monthly sunshine hours	69.7	73.5	75.8	105.4	130.5	136.5	233.0	211.6	159.0	147.0	117.4	108.2	1,567.6
Percentage possible sunshine	21	23	20	27	31	33	55	53	43	42	37	34	35
Source: China Meteorological Administration
