= Nanzhang County =

Nanzhang County 南漳县 Nanchang
- County
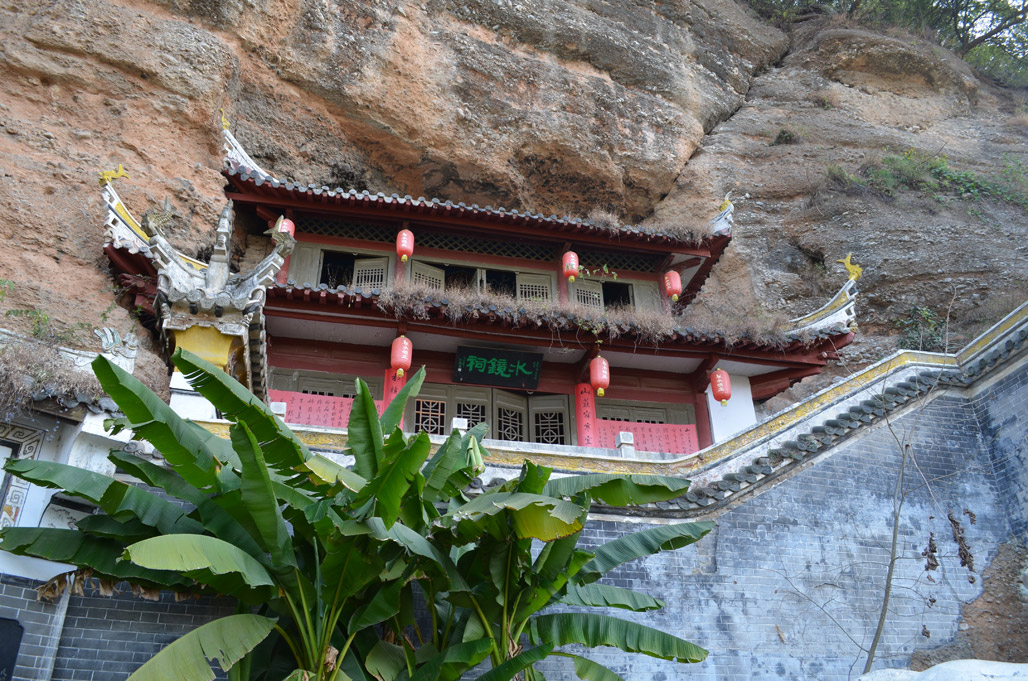
- Shuijingzhuang (水镜庄)

- Location of the seat in Hubei
- Coordinates (Nanzhang government): 31°46′29″N 111°50′20″E
- Country: People's Republic of China
- Province: Hubei
- Prefecture-level city: Xiangyang

Area
  - Total: 3,859 km^{2} (1,490 sq mi)

Population (2020)
  - Total: 455,690
  - Density: 118.1/km^{2} (305.8/sq mi)
- Time zone: UTC+8 (China Standard)
- Website: www.hbnz.gov.cn

Nanzhang County (simplified Chinese: 南漳县; traditional Chinese: 南漳縣; pinyin: Nánzhāng Xiàn) is a county of northwestern Hubei province, People's Republic of China. It is under the administration of Xiangyang City.

== Administrative divisions ==
Ten towns:

- Chengguan (城关镇), Wu'an (武安镇), Jiuji (九集镇), Limiao (李庙镇), Changping (长坪镇), Xueping (薛坪镇), Banqiao (板桥镇), Xunjian (巡检镇), Donggong (东巩镇), and Xiaoyan (肖堰镇)

One management district:

- Qinghe (清河管理区)

== Climate ==
Climate data for Nanzhang, elevation 151 m (495 ft), (1991–2020 normals, extremes 1981–2010)
Month	Jan	Feb	Mar	Apr	May	Jun	Jul	Aug	Sep	Oct	Nov	Dec	Year
Record high °C (°F)	21.2 (70.2)	24.8 (76.6)	31.0 (87.8)	35.2 (95.4)	36.4 (97.5)	39.6 (103.3)	40.2 (104.4)	38.4 (101.1)	39.0 (102.2)	33.3 (91.9)	27.6 (81.7)	23.3 (73.9)	40.2 (104.4)
Mean daily maximum °C (°F)	7.7 (45.9)	11.0 (51.8)	16.4 (61.5)	22.6 (72.7)	27.2 (81.0)	30.3 (86.5)	32.0 (89.6)	31.3 (88.3)	27.3 (81.1)	22.3 (72.1)	15.9 (60.6)	10.0 (50.0)	21.2 (70.1)
Daily mean °C (°F)	2.8 (37.0)	5.6 (42.1)	10.6 (51.1)	16.6 (61.9)	21.5 (70.7)	25.3 (77.5)	27.4 (81.3)	26.6 (79.9)	22.3 (72.1)	16.8 (62.2)	10.4 (50.7)	4.8 (40.6)	15.9 (60.6)
Mean daily minimum °C (°F)	−0.8 (30.6)	1.4 (34.5)	5.8 (42.4)	11.3 (52.3)	16.3 (61.3)	20.7 (69.3)	23.7 (74.7)	22.9 (73.2)	18.4 (65.1)	12.6 (54.7)	6.3 (43.3)	1.0 (33.8)	11.6 (52.9)
Record low °C (°F)	−10.0 (14.0)	−11.4 (11.5)	−5.0 (23.0)	0.1 (32.2)	4.4 (39.9)	12.4 (54.3)	17.8 (64.0)	14.5 (58.1)	9.1 (48.4)	−0.8 (30.6)	−4.4 (24.1)	−12.6 (9.3)	−12.6 (9.3)
Average precipitation mm (inches)	19.3 (0.76)	23.7 (0.93)	43.6 (1.72)	70.0 (2.76)	106.0 (4.17)	107.5 (4.23)	165.5 (6.52)	164.8 (6.49)	85.5 (3.37)	68.9 (2.71)	36.5 (1.44)	16.2 (0.64)	907.5 (35.74)
Average precipitation days (≥ 0.1 mm)	6.2	7.8	9.6	10.5	11.9	11.0	13.5	11.9	10.6	10.3	8.4	6.2	117.9
Average snowy days	4.6	3.2	1.2	0	0	0	0	0	0	0	0.7	2.0	11.7
Average relative humidity (%)	74	73	71	73	72	77	82	81	78	77	78	74	76
Mean monthly sunshine hours	105.1	108.1	140.5	162.5	175.1	164.4	169.7	179.4	141.1	139.1	125.4	114.9	1,725.3
Percentage possible sunshine	33	34	38	42	41	39	39	44	39	40	40	37	39
Source: China Meteorological Administration
