= Zhongchuan, Huining =

Town in China

Zhongchuan 中川镇
- Town
- Location within Gansu Location within China
- Coordinates: 35.49827°N 105.08011°E
- Country: China
- Province: Gansu
- Prefecture-level city: Baiyin
- County: Huining

Area
  - Total: 138 km^{2} (53 sq mi)

Population
  - Total: 15,989

Zhongchuan is a town of Huining County, Gansu, China. The town governs over 10 villages and has a population of 15,989. The town is specialized in rapeseed and apricot cultivation.
