= Yanbei, Jiangxi =

Yanbei 沿陂镇
- Town
- Location in Jiangxi Yanbei (China)
- Coordinates: 27°22′7″N 115°32′8″E
- Country: People's Republic of China
- Province: Jiangxi
- Prefecture-level city: Ji'an
- County: Yongfeng County
- Time zone: UTC+8 (China Standard)

Yanbei (Chinese: 沿陂; pinyin: Yánbēi) is a town under the administration of Yongfeng County, Jiangxi, China. As of 2020, it administers Jiangkou Residential Community (江口社区) and the following 12 villages:

- Jiantian Village (枧田村)
- Jijiang Village (吉江村)
- Shuidong Village (水东村)
- Luxia Village (芦下村)
- Tujia Village (涂家村)
- Xiapao Village (下袍村)
- Pengxi Village (彭溪村)
- Jiantou Village (枧头村)
- Chijiang Village (尺江村)
- Gubei Village (谷陂村)
- Huibei Village (洄陂村)
- Maojia Village (毛家村)

== See also ==
- List of township-level divisions of Jiangxi
