= Huishi =

Huishi 会师镇
- Town
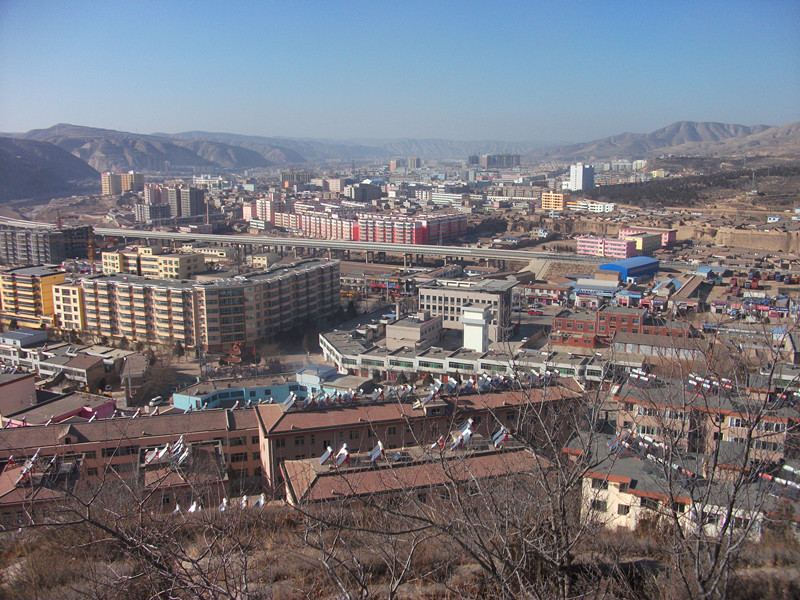
- Interactive map of Huishi
- Country: China
- Province: Gansu
- Prefecture-level city: Baiyin
- County: Huining
- Highest elevation: 2,100 m (6,900 ft)
- Lowest elevation: 1,800 m (5,900 ft)

Population
  - Town: 136,000
  - Urban: 42,500
  - Rural: 18,600

Huishi is a town of Huining County, Gansu, China. It is also the county seat. The town had a population of 136,000 in 2019. In October 1936, the Red Army met in Huishi to celebrate the end of the Long March. The town is named after this event, its name literally means 'meeting of the armies'.

Huishi governs over 8 residential communities and 8 villages.
