= Guochengyi =

Guochengyi 郭城驿镇
- Town
- Location within Gansu
- Coordinates: 36.2297632°N 104.8856619°E
- Country: China
- Province: Gansu
- Prefecture-level city: Baiyin
- County: Huining

Area
  - Town: 329 km^{2} (127 sq mi)
  - Urban: 13.48 km^{2} (5.20 sq mi)

Population
  - Town: 34,076
- Postal code: 730900

Guochengyi is a town of Huining County, Gansu, China. It consists of 11 administrative villages and 59 natural villages.

Just west of the town are ruins of a Jin dynasty (1115–1234) town, known historically as Huizhou (会州), but known today as Guohama (郭虾蟆), named after general Guo Hama (zh:郭虾蟆) Towards the end of the Long March in 1936, PLA troops were stations just north of the town for 50 days.

The town has significant watermelon farms.
