= A'gan =

A'gan 阿干镇
- Town
- Location within Gansu
- Coordinates: 35.9176°N 103.8501°E
- Country: People's Republic of China
- Province: Gansu
- Prefecture-level city: Lanzhou
- District: Qilihe District

Population (2018)
  - Total: 26,718

A'gan is a town of Qilihe District, Lanzhou, China. It is located in a mountainous area 20 kilometers south of Lanzhou's urban area. A'gan is located near a mountain pass on the route between Lanzhou and the historically important city of Lintao. The name A'gan is thought to be derived from an ancient folk song of the same name.

A'gan was established as early as 1083 as a fort, but it has been inhabited since prehistoric times, as shown by Majiayao culture ceramics found nearby. In 1182 it became A'gan County. In 1270, it was merged into Lanzhou. During the Ming Dynasty it was known as A'ganli. As early as 1268, coal mining started around the town, followed by pottery and iron industry, making it the earliest place where coal was mined in Gansu. It was also a regional market town. The first public coal mine was opened in 1938. In 1949, the PLA captured Lanzhou from the south, passing through the pass at A'gan.

During the early years of the People's Republic of China, the Communist government further developed the coal mining industry in the area. On April 1, 1955 construction started on the 27 km (17 mi) Lan'a Railway for coal transport between Lanzhou and A'gan. The railway opened on February 5, 1956. At that time, A'gan was the most important coal mining site in Gansu. Coal mining continued with a peak of 1 million tons annually in 1971. In the 1980s, around 100,000 people were employed in the town, working in the mines and surrounding industries, many of them commuting from Lanzhou.

After the 1980s, the coal mines were closed as they became exhausted, and the town entered an economic decline. The town is developing tourism to revitalize the economy.
