= Bali, Lanzhou =

Bali 八里镇
- Town
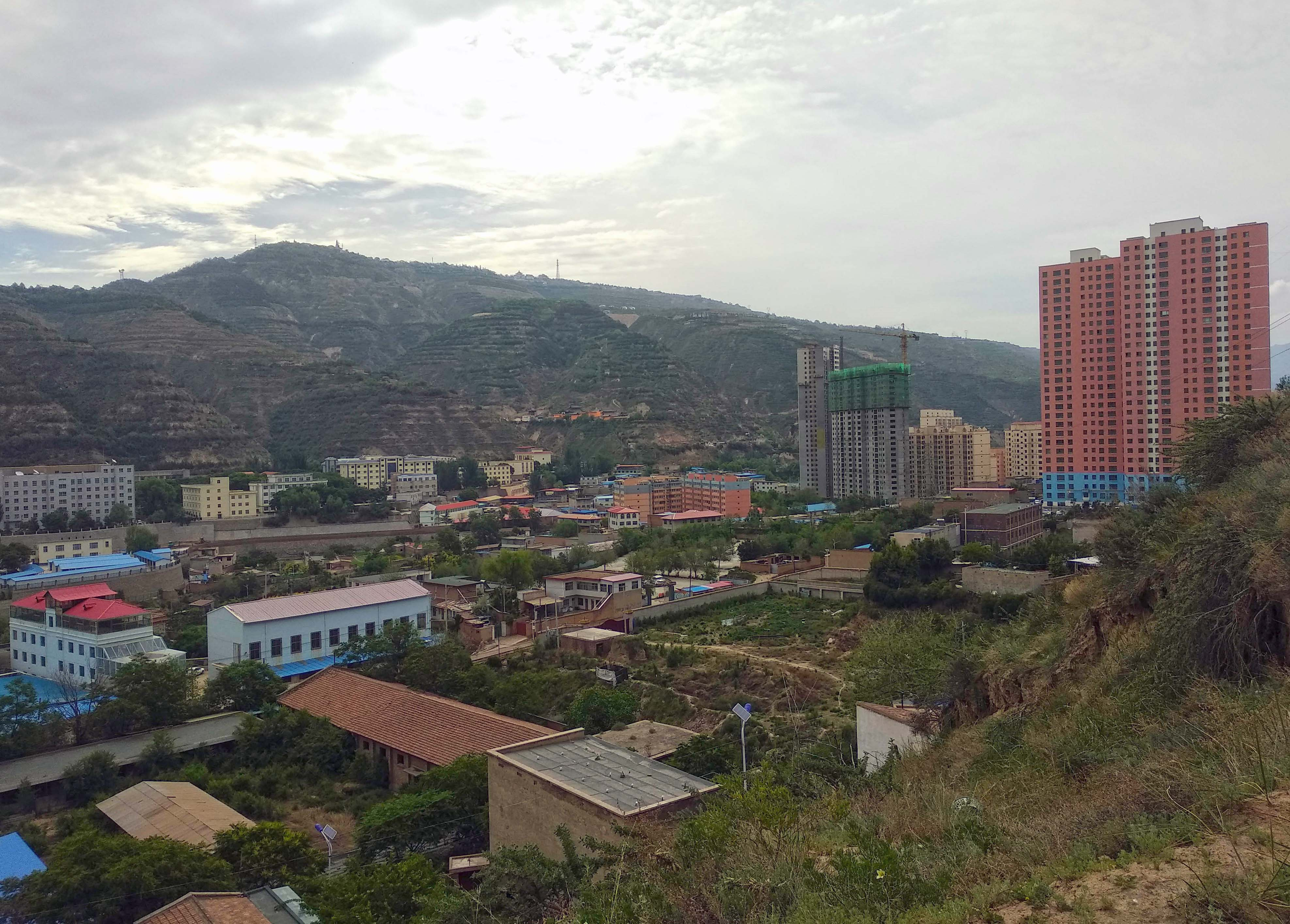

- Location in Gansu Location in China
- Coordinates: 35.99203°N 103.83325°E
- Country: China
- Province: Gansu
- City: Lanzhou
- District: Qilihe

Population
  - Town: 24,000
  - Urban: 8,370
  - Rural: 15,732

Bali is a town of Qilihe District, Lanzhou, China. The town is located circa 10 km away from downtown Lanzhou.

It has a population of 24,000 and administers 10 administrative villages and 4 communities.

The town specializes in peach and pear cultivation.
