= Donggong 429-class floating pile driver =

Chinese naval auxiliary ship

Class overview
- Operators: People's Liberation Army Navy

General characteristics
- Class & type: Donggong 429
- Electronic warfare & decoys: None
- Armament: Unarmed
- Aircraft carried: None
- Aviation facilities: None

Donggong 429 class floating pile driver is a class of little known naval auxiliary ship currently in service with the People's Liberation Army Navy (PLAN). The name of this class is after the first unit commissioned, with the exact type still remains unknown, and only a single unit of this class have been confirmed in active service as of mid-2010s.

Donggong 429 class series ships in PLAN service are designated by a combination of two Chinese characters followed by three-digit number. The second Chinese character is Gong (工), short for Gong-Cheng (工程), meaning engineering in Chinese, because these ships are ships built for engineering projects. The first Chinese character denotes which fleet the ship is service with, with East (Dong, 东) for East Sea Fleet, North (Bei, 北) for North Sea Fleet, and South (Nan, 南) for South Sea Fleet. However, the pennant numbers may have changed due to the change of Chinese naval ships naming convention.

Class	Pennant #	Status	Fleet
Donggong 429 class	Dong-Gong 429	Active	East Sea Fleet
