= Donggong, Hubei =

Donggong 东巩镇
- Town
- Location in Hubei
- Coordinates: 31°19′27″N 111°50′9″E
- Country: People's Republic of China
- Province: Hubei
- Prefecture-level city: Xiangyang
- County: Nanzhang County
- Time zone: UTC+8 (China Standard)

Donggong (simplified Chinese: 东巩; traditional Chinese: 東鞏; pinyin: Dōnggǒng) is a town under the administration of Nanzhang County, Hubei, China. As of 2018, it has two residential communities and 22 villages under its administration.
