= Yanbei Subdistrict, Qihe County =

Yanbei Subdistrict 晏北街道
- Subdistrict
- Location in Shandong
- Coordinates: 36°47′58″N 116°45′38″E
- Country: People's Republic of China
- Province: Shandong
- Prefecture-level city: Dezhou
- County: Qihe County
- Time zone: UTC+8 (China Standard)

Yanbei Subdistrict (Chinese: 晏北街道; pinyin: Yànběi Jiēdào) is a subdistrict in Qihe County, Shandong, China. As of 2020, it administers Tiebei Residential Community (铁北社区) and the following 92 villages:

== Villages ==
- Xiaoli Village (小李村)
- Beisong Village (北宋村)
- Huobazhang Village (火把张村)
- Nanmazhuang Village (南马庄村)
- Yuansun Village (元孙村)
- Manziying Village (蛮子营村)
- Xiaohuang Village (小黄村)
- Heli Village (河李村)
- Yangshi'an Village (杨士安村)
- Hanzhuang Village (韩庄村)
- Wangguan Village (王官村)
- Xiaodai Village (小代村)
- Zhangxin Village (张辛村)
- Hudian Village (胡店村)
- Dingzhuang Village (丁庄村)
- Tangzhuang Village (汤庄村)
- Wasong Village (瓦宋村)
- Xichenzhuang Village (西陈庄村)
- Sunzhuang Village (孙庄村)
- Tantun Village (谭屯村)
- Shiziliu Village (狮子刘村)
- Zongwu Village (宗吴村)
- Gaozhuang Village (高庄村)
- Qianyang Village (前杨村)
- Caiwang Village (蔡王村)
- Huangzhuang Village (黄庄村)
- Dongmazhuang Village (东马庄村)
- Houyang Village (后杨村)
- Liumiao Village (刘庙村)
- Daguazhang Village (大瓜张村)
- Yaozhuang Village (姚庄村)
- Laoxu Village (老徐村)
- Fawang Village (法王村)
- Maoguanzhou Village (毛官周村)
- Xiwei Village (西魏村)
- Beisun Village (北孙村)
- Sangyuanzhao Village (桑元赵村)
- Yuanxin Village (袁辛村)
- Jiaobin Village (焦斌村)
- Mazhai Village (马宅村)
- Cuizhuang Village (崔庄村)
- Dongchenzhuang Village (东陈庄村)
- Shiziwang Village (狮子王村)
- Xiao'an Village (小安村)
- Huangpu Village (黄铺村)
- Liu'an Village (刘安村)
- Liguan Village (李官村)
- Duxi Village (杜西村)
- Dudong Village (杜东村)
- Linzhuang Village (林庄村)
- Huguan Village (胡官村)
- Liuzhuang Village (刘庄村)
- Anfu Village (安付村)
- Zhaozhuang Village (赵庄村)
- Liushan Village (刘善村)
- Xiaofei Village (小费村)
- Liudong Village (柳东村)
- Liuhang Village (柳杭村)
- Haozhuang Village (郝庄村)
- Quanyu Village (全玉村)
- Zhouzhuang Village (周庄村)
- Xinfatun Village (辛法屯村)
- Beimazhuang Village (北马庄村)
- Donggao Village (东高村)
- Xufang Village (徐坊村)
- Xigao Village (西高村)
- Jianchang Village (碱场村)
- Shimiao Village (石庙村)
- Beiwei Village (北魏村)
- Xutun Village (徐屯村)
- Yuanzhuang Village (袁庄村)
- Housi Village (后寺村)
- Maguan Village (马官村)
- Gezhuang Village (葛庄村)
- Liuming Village (刘明村)
- Yihe Village (义合村)
- Tangzhuang Village (唐庄村)
- Xiaoxin Village (小辛村)
- Louzizhang Village (楼子张村)
- Wawudian Village (瓦屋店村)
- Chunli Village (纯李村)
- Damoliu Village (大漠刘村)
- Liuxi Village (柳西村)
- Baoguan Village (鲍官村)
- Nanxie Village (南谢村)
- Caidong Village (蔡东村)
- Qianhousui Village (前后随村)
- Caixi Village (蔡西村)
- Yongfeng Village (永锋村)
- Nanbei Village (南北村)
- Kaitai Village (开泰村)
- Laoliu Village (老刘村)

== See also ==
- List of township-level divisions of Shandong
