= Yanbei Subdistrict, Lanzhou =

Yanbei Subdistrict 雁北街道
- Subdistrict
- Location in Gansu
- Coordinates: 36.0725°N 103.8746°E
- Country: People's Republic of China
- Province: Gansu
- Prefecture-level city: Lanzhou
- District: Chengguan District
- Time zone: UTC+8 (China Standard)

Yanbei Subdistrict (Chinese: 雁北街道; pinyin: Yànběi Jiēdào) is a subdistrict in Chengguan District, Lanzhou, Gansu, China. As of 2020, it administers the following three residential neighborhoods and two villages:

Neighborhoods

- Yantan Daqiao Community (雁滩大桥社区)
- Yantan Road Community (雁滩路社区)
- Yanxi Road Community (雁西路社区)

Villages

- Xiaoyantan Village (小雁滩村)
- Songjiatan Village (宋家滩村)

== See also ==
- List of township-level divisions of Gansu
