= Donggang Subdistrict =

Donggang Subdistrict 东岗街道
- Subdistrict
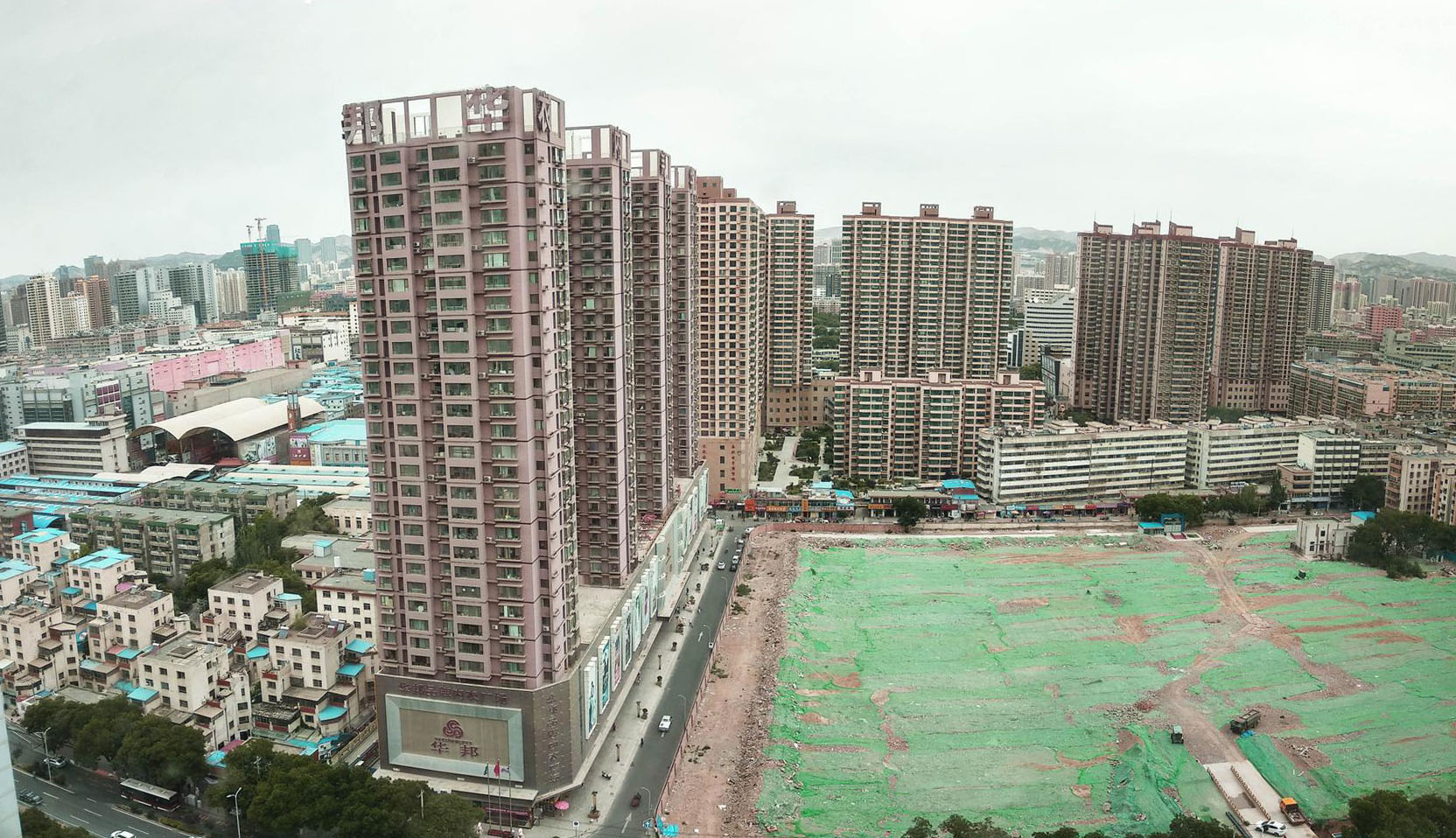

- Location in Gansu Province Location in China
- Coordinates: 36°02′24″N 103°55′03″E
- Country: China
- Province: Gansu
- City: Lanzhou
- District: Chengguan

Area
  - Subdistrict: 13.8 km^{2} (5.3 sq mi)

Population
  - Subdistrict: 56,070
  - Rural: 764
- Time zone: UTC+8 (China Standard Time)

Donggang Subdistrict (simplified Chinese: 东岗街道; traditional Chinese: 東崗街道; pinyin: Dōnggǎng Jiēdào) is a subdistrict in Chengguan District, Lanzhou, Gansu Province, China.

Located near downtown Lanzhou, and at the eastern entrance to the city, is it home to many state-owned enterprises, colleges and universities and logistics businesses.

== Administrative divisions ==
The sub-district governs 5 residential communities and 4 administrative villages.

- Shengouqiao community
- Yan'erwan community
- Zhenxing community
- Xinxing community
- Taoshuping community

== Transportation ==
The area is served by Line 1 of the Lanzhou Metro.
