= Chengguan, Lanzhou =

Chengguan 城关区
- District
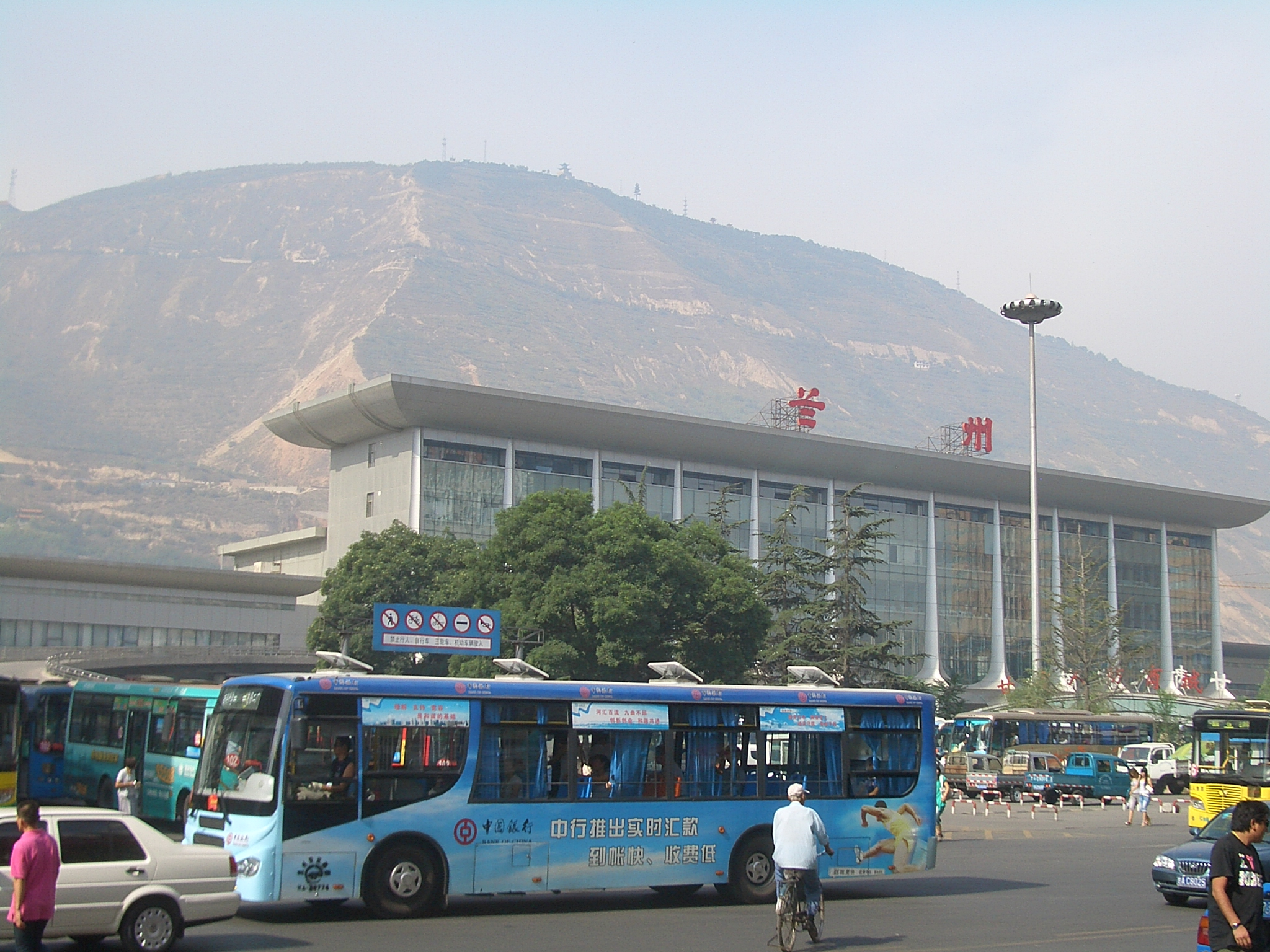
- Lanzhou Railway Station, with the Gaolan Mountain in the background.

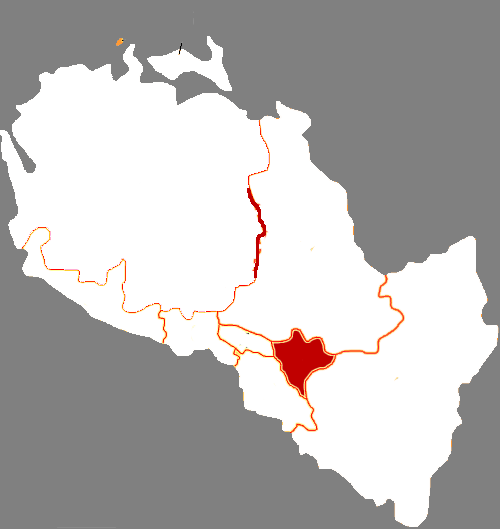
- Location in Lanzhou

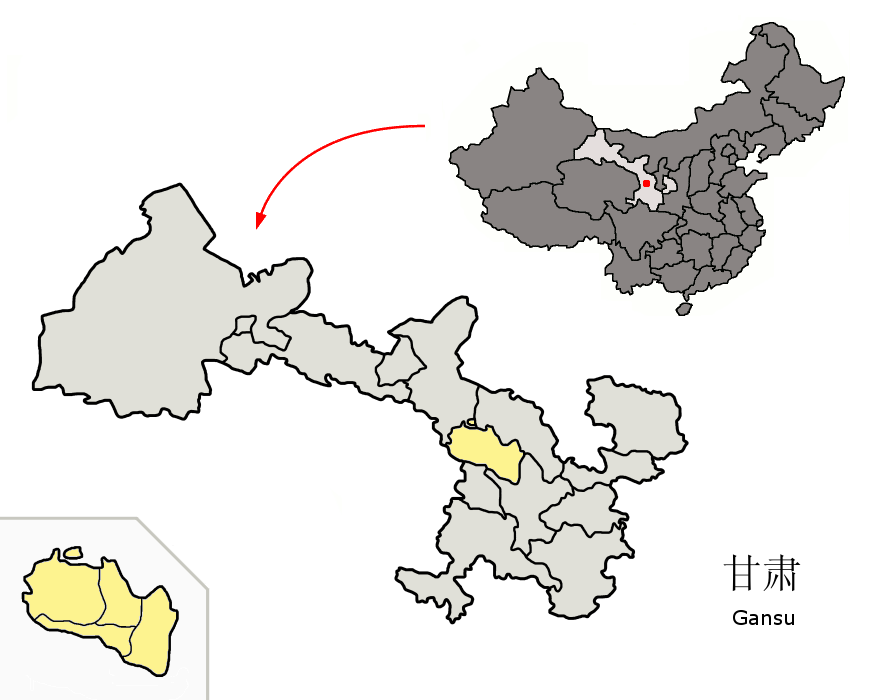
- Lanzhou in Gansu

- Location in Gansu
- Coordinates (Gansu provincial government): 36°03′38″N 103°49′36″E
- Country: China
- Province: Gansu
- Prefecture-level city: Lanzhou
- District seat: Yanbei Subdistrict

Area
  - District: 220 km^{2} (85 sq mi)
  - Metro: 67.92 km^{2} (26.22 sq mi)
- Highest elevation: 2,171 m (7,123 ft)
- Lowest elevation: 1,503 m (4,931 ft)

Population (2020 census)
  - District: 1,484,016
  - Density: 6,700/km^{2} (17,000/sq mi)
- Time zone: UTC+8 (China Standard)
- Postal code: 730030
- Website: www.lzcgq.gov.cn

Chengguan District (simplified Chinese: 城关区; traditional Chinese: 城關區; pinyin: Chéngguān Qū; lit. 'City Gate District') is one of 5 districts and the municipal seat of the prefecture-level city of Lanzhou, the capital of Gansu Province, China. It is located mostly on the southern side of the Yellow River, and includes the downtown Lanzhou. Both the Gansu provincial government capitol and that of Lanzhou prefecture-level city are located within the district. The Lanzhou Railway Station is also located in this district.

== History ==
The area has been inhabited by Qiang since the Xia dynasty (2070 BC). In 215 BC, Meng Tian captured the area south of the Yellow River from Hu barbarians and Yuzhong County was established at the current location of Donggang Subdistrict in Chengguan. In 581, the area was known as Wuquan County, renamed to Jincheng County in 671.

By the Tang dynasty, Chengguan became the seat of the Zhou ('province'), Commandery and County. In 1104 it was known as Lanquan County. By 1369, Lanzhou, then called Lan County, became subordinate under Lintao County.

In 1399 the city walls of Lanzhou were built.

In 1666, the governor of Gansu moved back to Lanzhou. In 1764 the administrative centers moved back to Chengguan, then known as Gaolan County. In 1941 present day Gaolan County was spun off and the modern Chengguan District was established, which then encompassed the entire urban area of Lanzhou. Since 1955 the district is named Chengguan, named after the old city centre of Lanzhou. During the Cultural Revolution it was named Dongfeng District (东风区).

In 2005 all towns were abolished and since then the district is divided in subdistricts only.

== Administrative divisions ==
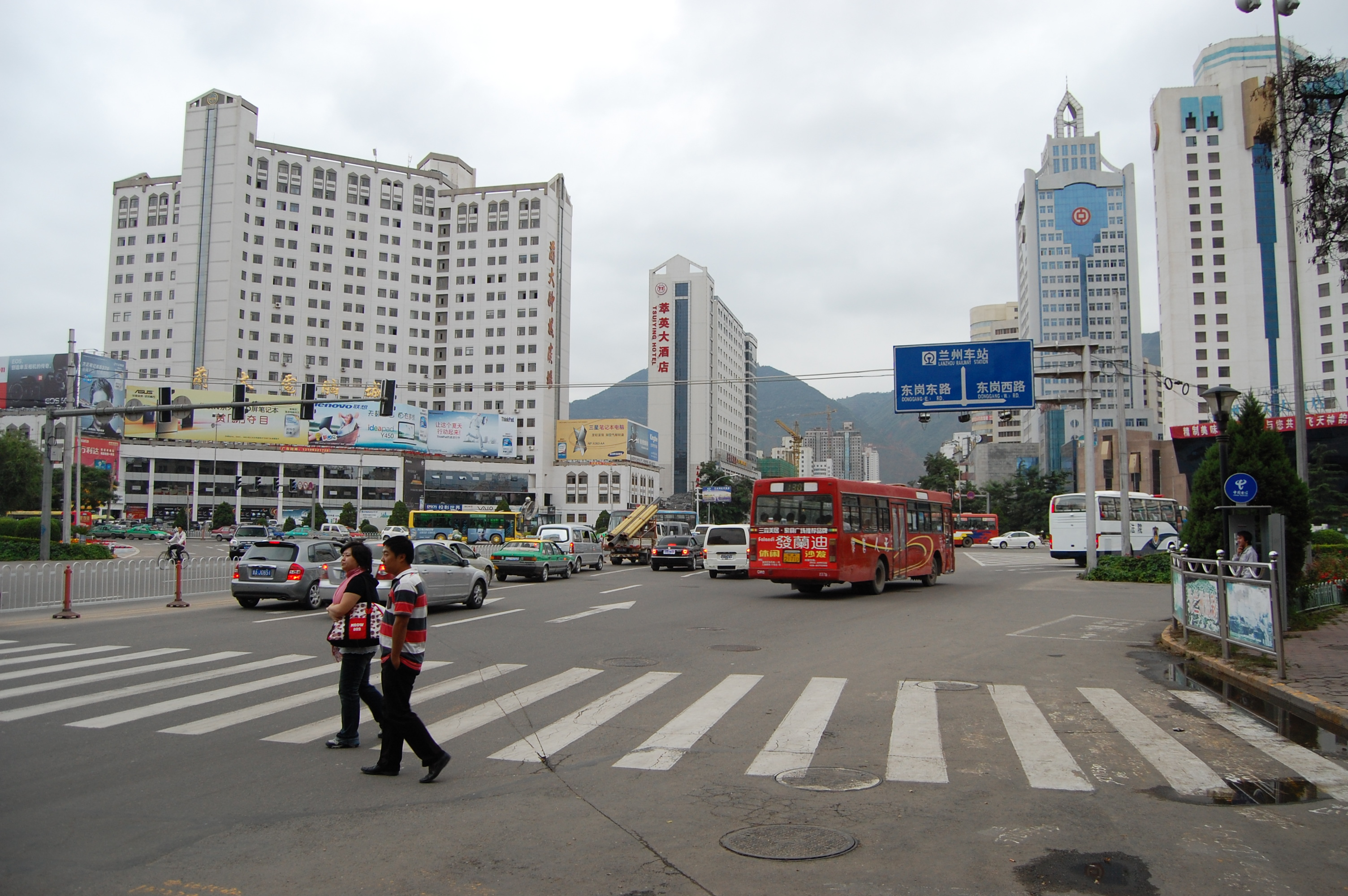
One of the main traffic junctions in Chengguan District

The district is divided in 26 subdistricts:

- Jiuquan Road Subdistrict (酒泉路街道)
- Zhangye Road Subdistrict (张掖路街道)
- Yannan Subdistrict (雁南街道)
- Linxia Road Subdistrict (临夏路街道)
- Yanbei Subdistrict (雁北街道)
- Wuquan Subdistrict (五泉街道)
- Baiyin Road Subdistrict (白银路街道)
- Gaolan Road Subdistrict (皋兰路街道)
- Guangwumen Subdistrict (广武门街道)
- Fulongping Subdistrict (伏龙坪街道)
- Jingyuan Road Subdistrict (靖远路街道)
- Caochang Street Subdistrict (草场街街道)
- Railway Station Subdistrict (火车站街道)
- Gongxindun Subdistrict (拱星墩街道)
- Donggang Subdistrict (东岗街道)
- Tuanjie Xincun Subdistrict (团结新村街道)
- Donggang West Road Subdistrict (东岗西路街道)
- Tielu Dongcun Subdistrict (铁路东村街道)
- Tielu Xicun Subdistrict (铁路西村街道)
- Weiyuan Road Subdistrict (渭源路街道)
- Yanchang Road Subdistrict (盐场路街道)
- Jiayuguan Road Subdistrict (嘉峪关路街道)
- Jiaojiawan Subdistrict (焦家湾街道)
- Qingbaishi Subdistrict (青白石街道)
- Yanyuan Subdistrict (雁园街道)
- Gaoxinqu Subdistrict (高新区街道)

== See also ==
- List of administrative divisions of Gansu
