= List of universities and colleges in Gansu =

The following is List of Universities and Colleges in Gansu.

== Public ==
- Lanzhou University, founded 1909 (Project 985, Project 211, Double First Class University Plan)
- Northwest University for Nationalities
- Northwest Normal University, founded 1902
- Lanzhou University of Technology, founded 1919
- Lanzhou Jiaotong University, founded 1958
- Gansu Agricultural University, founded 1958
- Gansu University of Traditional Chinese Medicine (甘肃中医药大学)
- Lanzhou University of Finance and Economics (兰州商学院)
- Gansu Political Science and Law Institute (甘肃政法学院)
- Tianshui Normal Institute (Tianshui) (天水师范学院)
- Hexi Institute (Zhangye) (河西学院)
- Longdong College (Qingyang)
- Gansu Institute of Administration (甘肃行政学院)
- Lanzhou Institute of Technology (兰州工业学院)
