= Lanzhou BRT =

Rapid bus transit system in Lanzhou, China

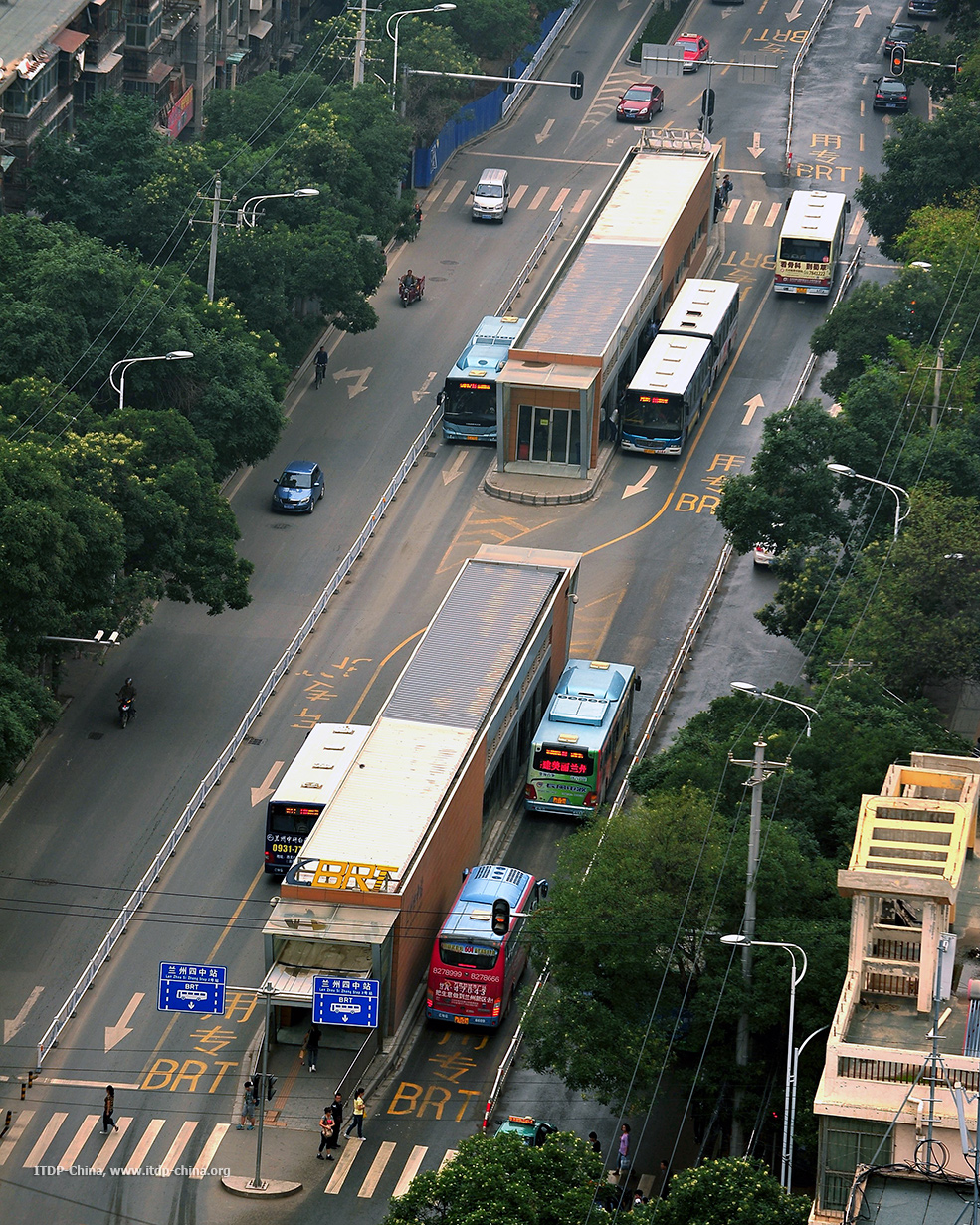
- Sizhong station

Overview
- Locale: Lanzhou
- Transit type: Bus rapid transit
- Number of lines: 2
- Number of stations: 20
- Daily ridership: 309,000/day

Operation
- Began operation: December 28, 2012; 13 years ago
- Operator: Lanzhou No. 3 Bus Company
- Number of vehicles: 70
- Headway: 1 to 1.5 minutes

Technical
- System length: 9.1 km (5.65 mi)
- Average speed: 22 km/h

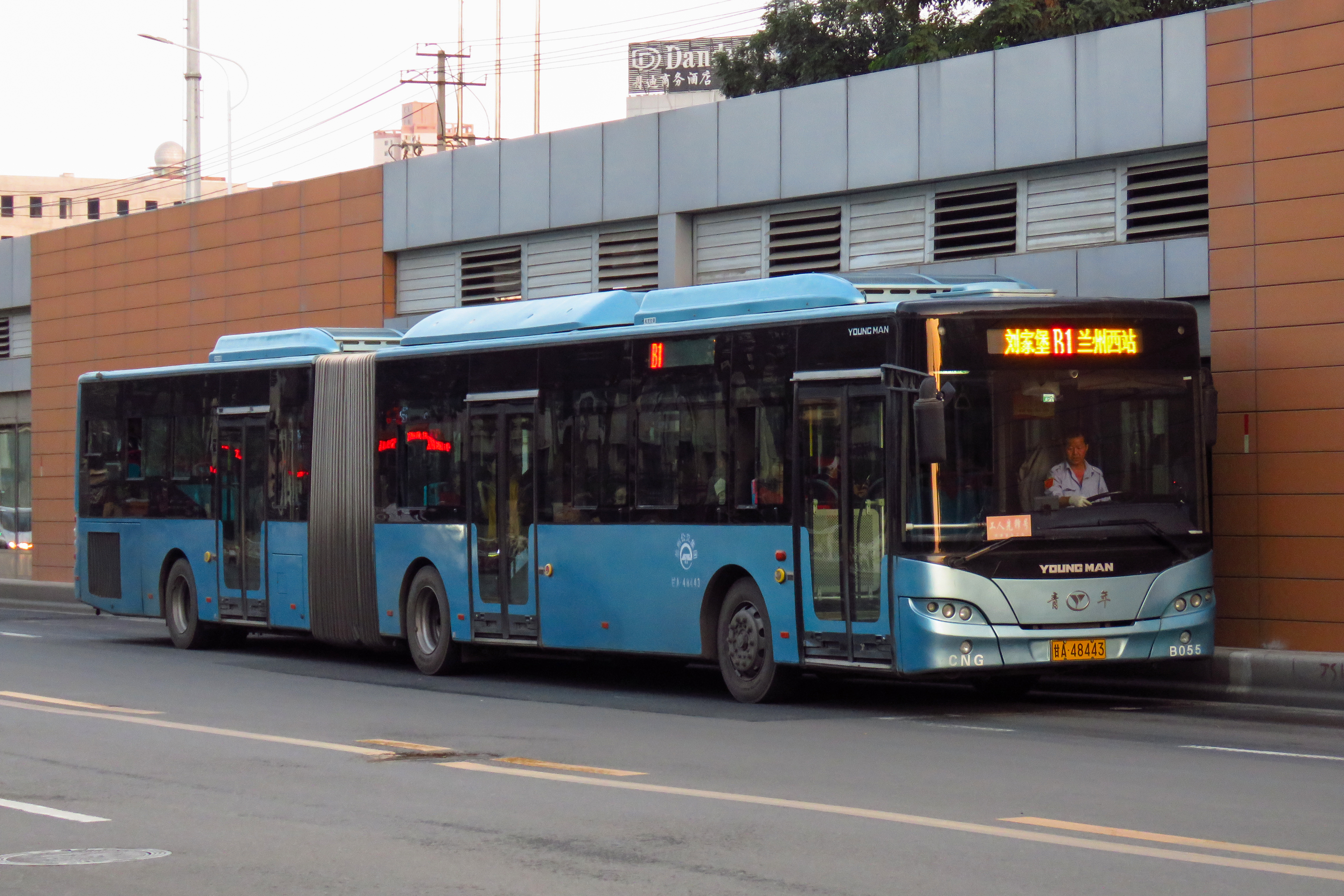
Bus with doors on both sides

Lanzhou BRT is a bus rapid transit system in Lanzhou, China. There is one line in operation, the total length of the system is 9.1 kilometres (5.7 mi) and there are in total 20 stations. The buses are supplied by Youngman. Flat fare is 2 yuan. Six conventional bus lines also use parts of the BRT network.The Route B2 opened on November 26, 2019, making the Lanzhou BRT two-route system.

The system was partially inspired by the Guangzhou Bus Rapid Transit system.

== Split stations ==
Lanzhou BRT is the first BRT system to use split stations. Several of the platforms are located in the middle of the road, and buses in both directions stop cross-platform. This saves platform space. However, it requires the buses to be fitted with doors on both sides. Passenger access the platforms through overpasses or underground pedestrian tunnels.

== Route B1 ==
| Station Name (English) | Station Name (Chinese) |
|---|---|
| Lujiapu Square | 刘家堡广场 |
| Century Boulevard | 世纪大道 |
| Taohei market | 桃海市场 |
| Feijiaying | 费家营 |
| Anning District government building | 安宁区政府 |
| Lanzhou Jiaotong University | 兰州交通大学 |
| University of Politics | 政法大学 |
| Northwest Normal University | 西北师大 |
| Peili square | 培黎广场 |
| Shilidian | 十里店 |
| Xingfu lane | 幸福巷 |
| Qilihe bridge north | 七里河黄河桥北 |
| Qilihe bridge south | 七里河黄河桥南 |
| Sizhong | 四中 |
| Lanzhou West Railway Station Cross | 西站十字 |

== Route B2 ==
| Station Name (English) | Station Name (Chinese) |
|---|---|
| Lujiapu Square | 刘家堡广场 |
| Mogao Boulevard | 莫高大道 |
| Chenglinlukou | 城临路口 |
| Zhongbang Boulevard north exit | 众邦大道北口 |
| | 安宁堡（仁寿山） |

== See also ==
- List of bus rapid transit systems
