= Lanzhou =

Capital of Gansu, China

Lanzhou 兰州市
- Prefecture-level city
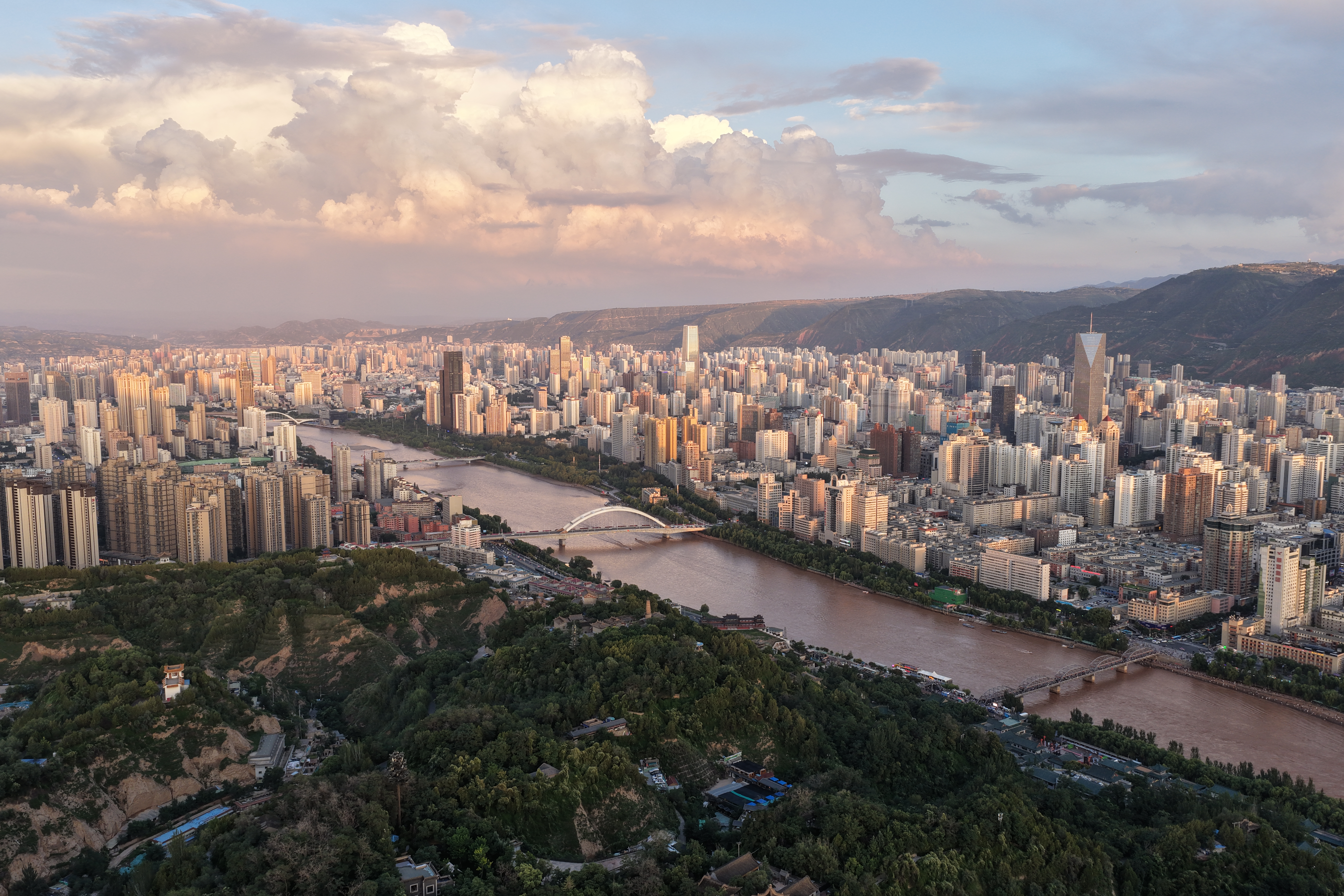
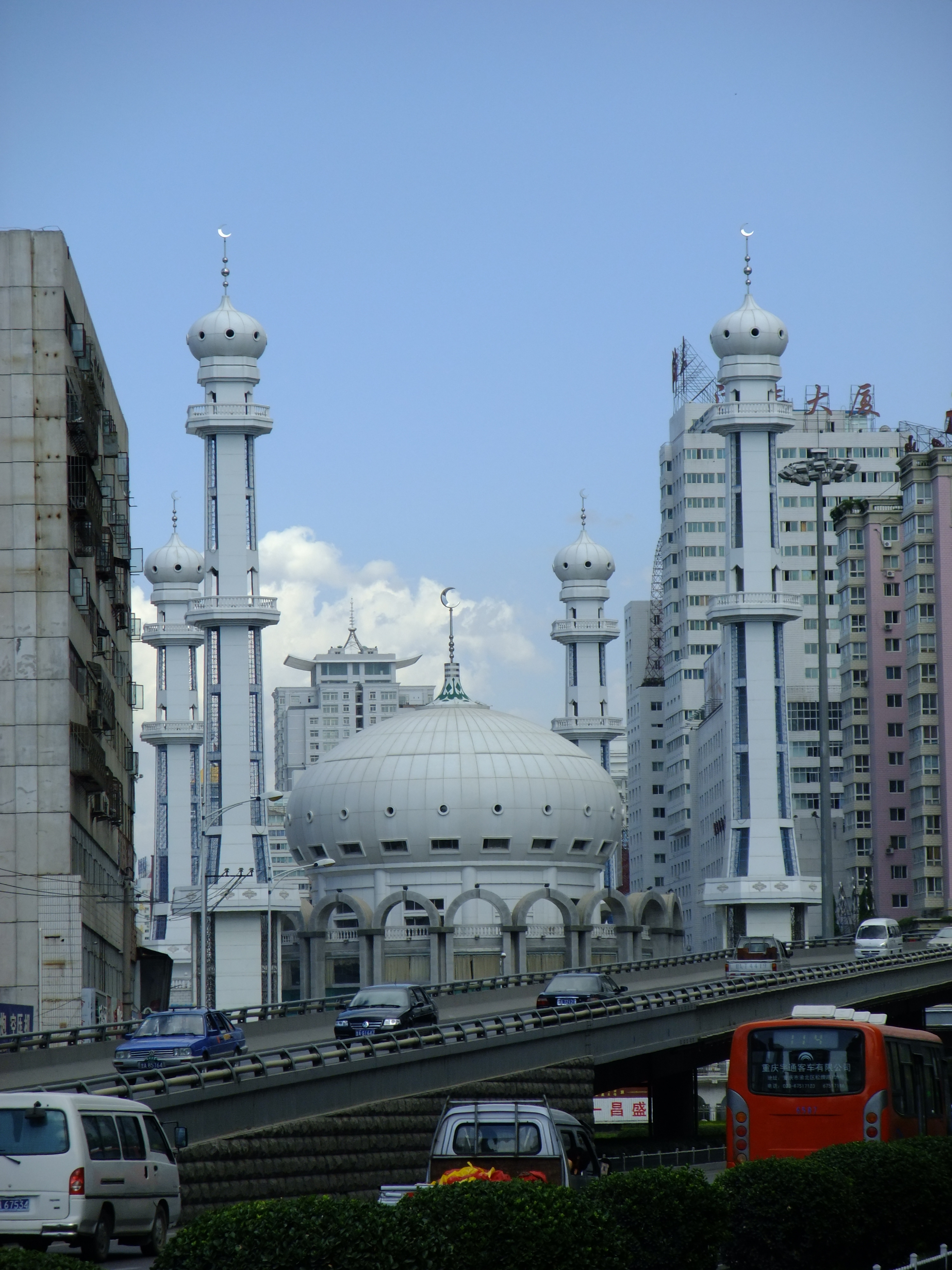
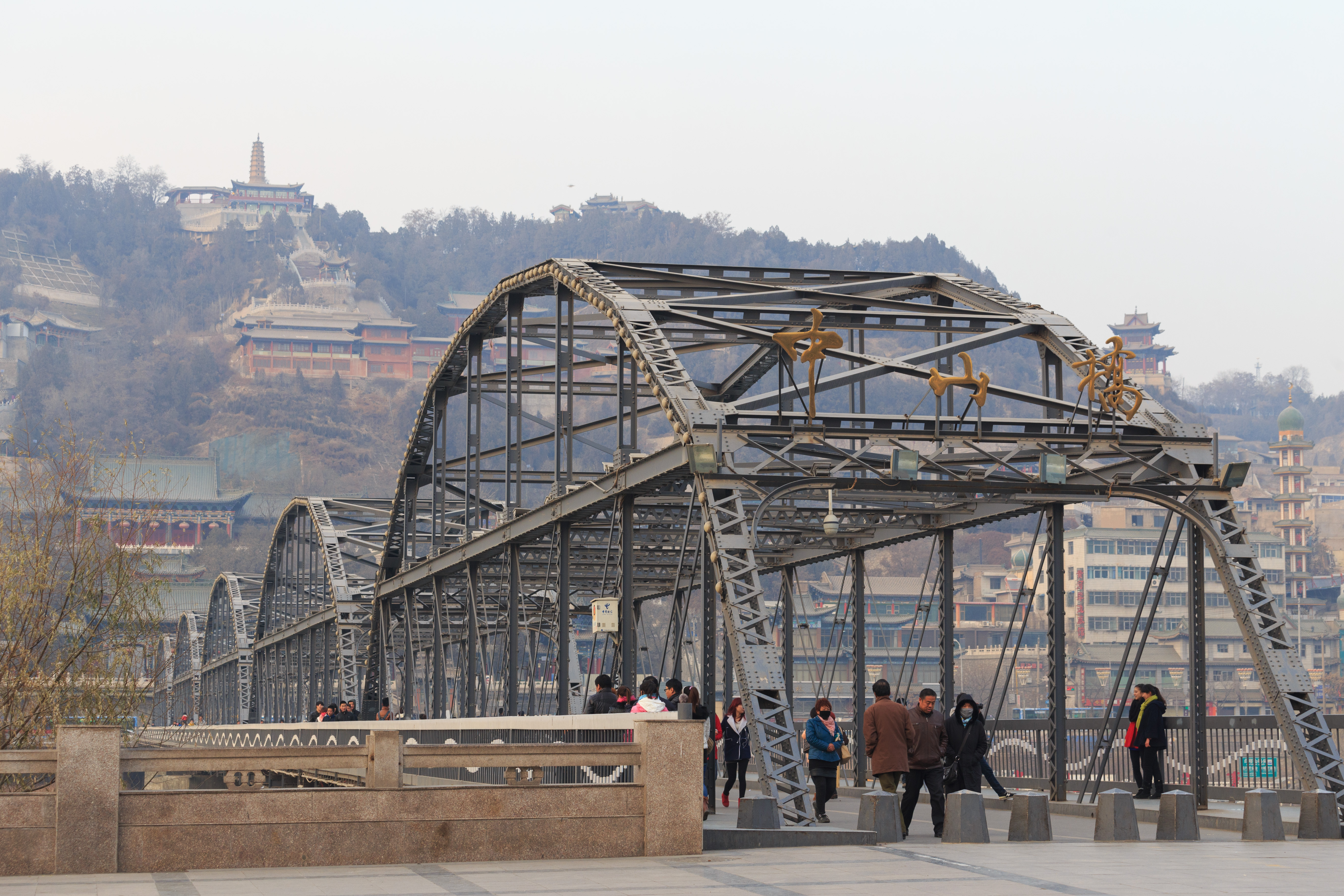
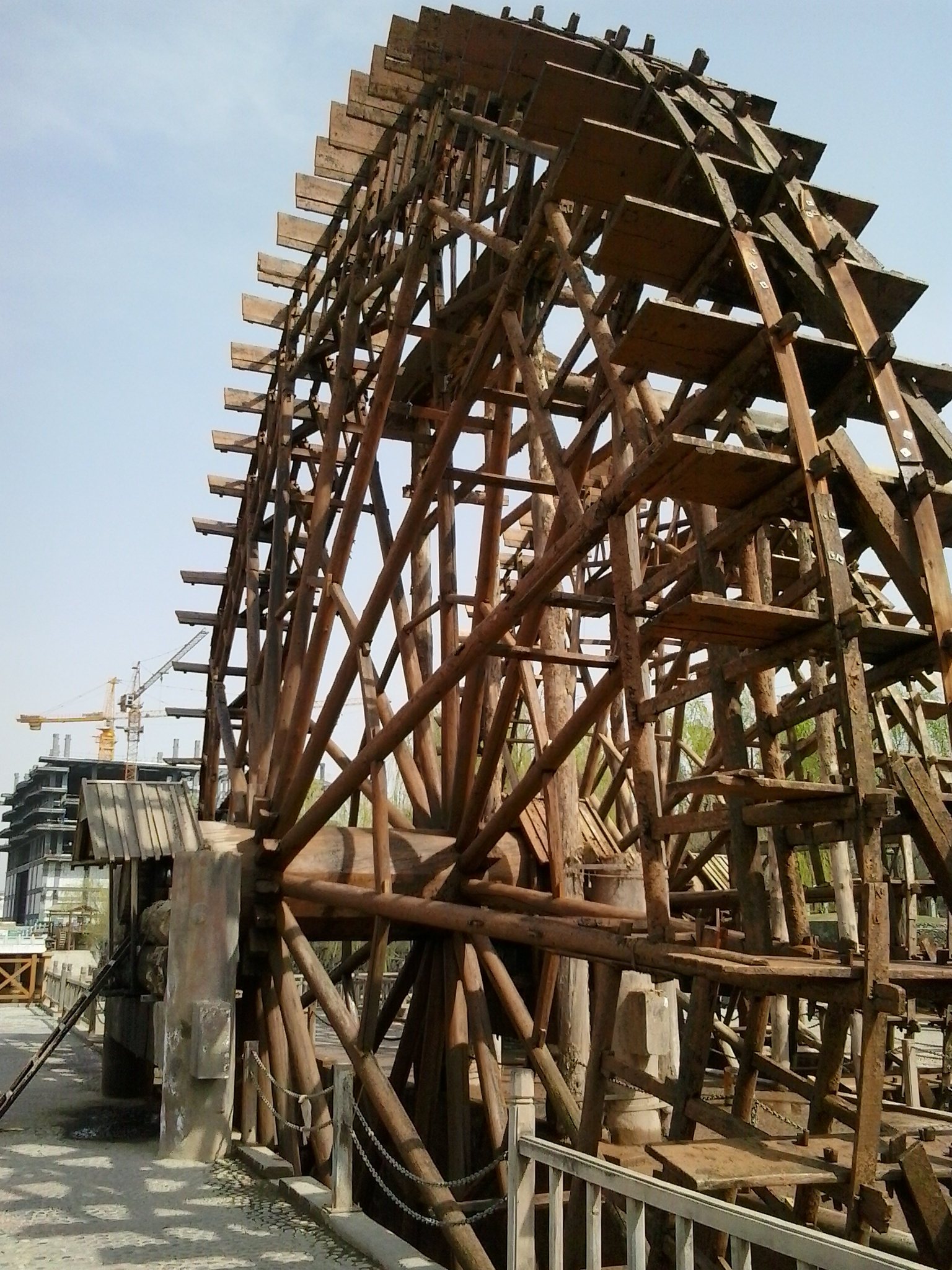
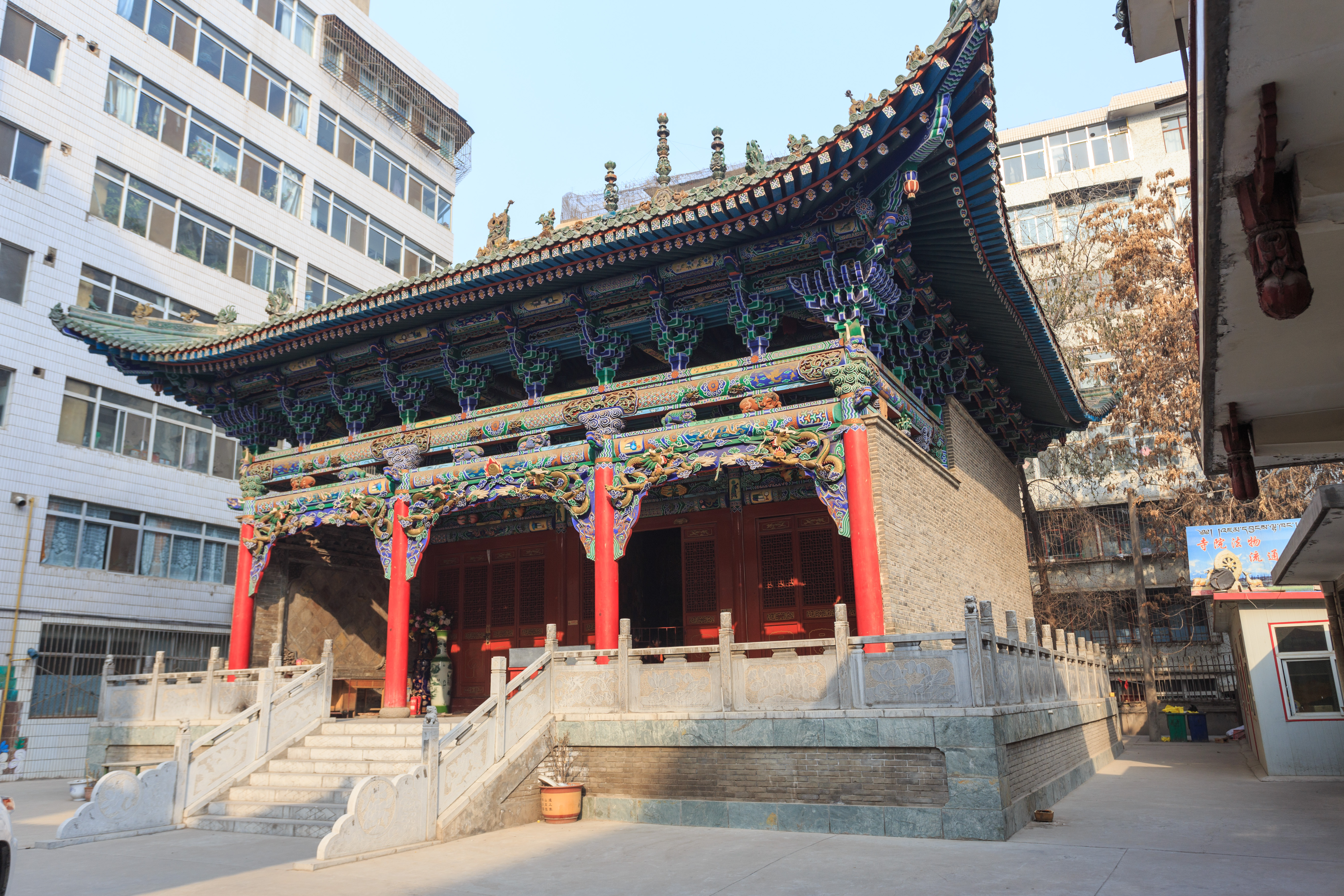
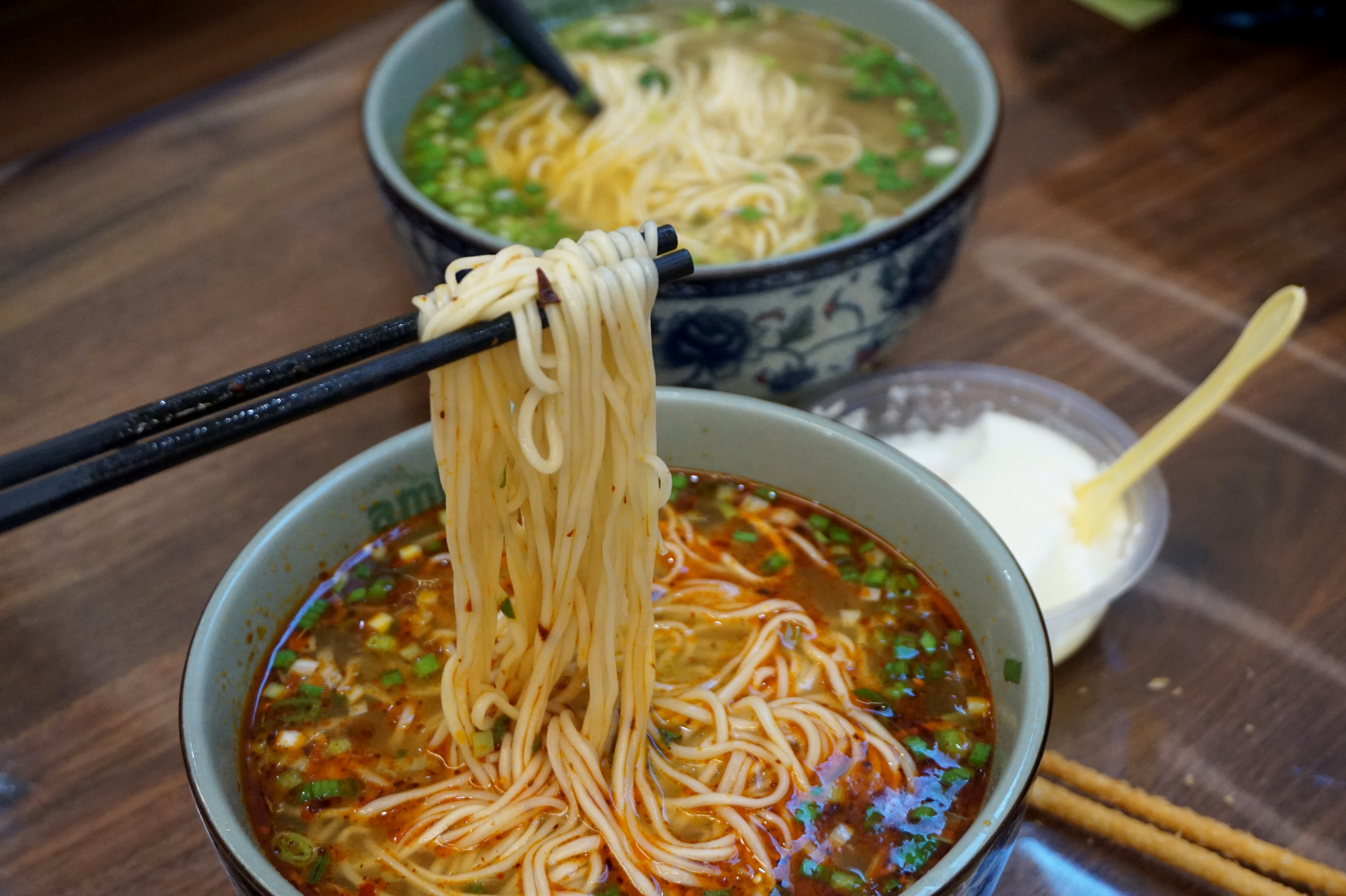
- Lanzhou skyline and the Yellow River Xiguan Mosque Zhongshan Bridge Waterwheel Expo Garden Chanyuan Temple Lanzhou beef noodles
- Interactive map of Lanzhou
- Location of the city center in Gansu Lanzhou (China)
- Coordinates (Gansu People's Government): 36°03′38″N 103°49′36″E
- Country: China
- Province: Gansu
- County-level divisions: 8
- Municipal seat: Chengguan District

Government
  - Type: Prefecture-level city
  - Body: Lanzhou Municipal People's Congress
  - CCP Secretary: Zhang Xiaoqiang
  - Congress Chairman: Zhang Jianping
  - Mayor: Liu Jianxun
  - CPPCC Chairman: Li Hongya

Area
  - Prefecture-level city: 13,086.9 km^{2} (5,052.9 sq mi)
  - Urban: 2,432.9 km^{2} (939.3 sq mi)
  - Metro: 1,112.9 km^{2} (429.7 sq mi)

Population (2020 census)
  - Prefecture-level city: 4,359,446
  - Density: 333.115/km^{2} (862.765/sq mi)
  - Urban: 3,474,858
  - Urban density: 1,428.3/km^{2} (3,699.2/sq mi)
  - Metro: 3,042,863
  - Metro density: 2,734.2/km^{2} (7,081.5/sq mi)

GDP
  - Prefecture-level city: CN¥ 209.6 billion US$ 33.7 billion
  - Per capita: CN¥ 56,972; US$ 9,147
- Time zone: UTC+8 (China Standard)
- Postal code: 730000
- Area code: 931
- ISO 3166 code: CN-GS-01
- License plate prefixes: 甘A
- Website: www.lanzhou.gov.cn

Lanzhou
- "Lanzhou" in Simplified (top) and Traditional (bottom) Chinese characters
- Simplified Chinese: 兰州
- Traditional Chinese: 蘭州
- Postal: Lanchow
- Literal meaning: "Orchid [Hills] Prefecture"
Transcriptions
Standard Mandarin
- Hanyu Pinyin: Lánzhōu
- Bopomofo: ㄌㄢˊ ㄓㄡ
- Gwoyeu Romatzyh: Lanjou
- Wade–Giles: Lan^{2}-chou^{1}
- IPA: [lǎn.ʈʂóʊ]
other Mandarin
- Xiao'erjing: لًا جِوْ
- Dungan: Ланҗу
Wu
- Suzhounese: Le^{2}-tseu^{1}
Yue: Cantonese
- Yale Romanization: Làahn-jāu
- Jyutping: Laan^{4}-zau^{1}
- IPA: [lan˩.tsɐw˥]
Southern Min
- Hokkien POJ: Lân-chiu
- Tâi-lô: Lân-tsiu

Lanzhou (Note: UK: /lænˈdʒoʊ/, US: /lɒn-/; Chinese: 兰州; pinyin: Lánzhōu), formerly Lanchow, is the capital and largest city of Gansu province in northwestern China. Located on the banks of the Yellow River, it is a key regional transportation hub, connecting areas further west by rail to the eastern half of the country. Historically, it has been a major link on the Northern Silk Road and it stands to become a major hub on the New Eurasian Land Bridge. The city is also a center for heavy industry and the petrochemical industry.

Lanzhou is the geographical center of China's land territory, and the third largest city in Northwestern China after Xi'an and Ürümqi. Lanzhou is also an important center for scientific research and education in Northwestern China after Xi'an. The city is one of the top 50 major cities in the world by scientific research output as tracked by the Nature Index. It hosts several research institutions, including, Lanzhou University, Northwest Normal University, Lanzhou University of Technology, Gansu Agricultural University, Gansu University of Chinese Medicine, and Lanzhou Jiaotong University.

== History ==
=== Early history ===
Originally in the territory of the ancient Western Qiangs, Lanzhou became part of the territory of the State of Qin in the 6th century BC.

In 81 BC, under the Han dynasty (206 BC–AD 220), it was taken from the Huns' Huyandi Chanyu and made the seat of Jincheng commandery (jùn), and later of the Jincheng (Golden City) county (xiàn), later renamed Yunwu.

From at least the first millennium BC it was a major link on the ancient Northern Silk Road, and also an important historic Yellow River crossing site. To protect the city, the Great Wall of China was extended as far as Yumen. Parts of the Great Wall still exist within the built-up area.

After the fall of the Han dynasty, Lanzhou became the capital of a succession of tribal states. In the 4th century it was briefly the capital of the independent state of Liang. The Northern Wei dynasty (386–534) reestablished Jincheng commandery, renaming the county Jincheng.

=== Medieval times ===
Mixed with different cultural heritages, the area at present-day Gansu province, from the 5th to the 11th century, became a center for Buddhist study. Under the Sui dynasty (581–618) the city became the seat of Lanzhou prefecture for the first time, retaining this name under the Tang dynasty (618–907). In 763 the area was overrun by the Tibetan Empire and in 843 was reclaimed by the Tang. Later it fell into the hands of the Western Xia dynasty (which flourished in Qinghai from the 11th to 13th century) and was subsequently absorbed by the Song dynasty (960–1126) in 1081. The name Lanzhou was reestablished, and the county renamed Lanzhuan.

After 1127 it fell into the hands of the Jin dynasty, and after 1235 it came into the possession of the Mongol Empire.

=== Ming and Qing ===
Under the Ming dynasty (1368–1644) the prefecture was demoted to a county and placed under the administration of Lintao superior prefecture, but in 1477 Lanzhou was reestablished as a political unit.

The city acquired its current name in 1656, during the Qing dynasty. When Gansu was made a separate province in 1666, Lanzhou became its capital.

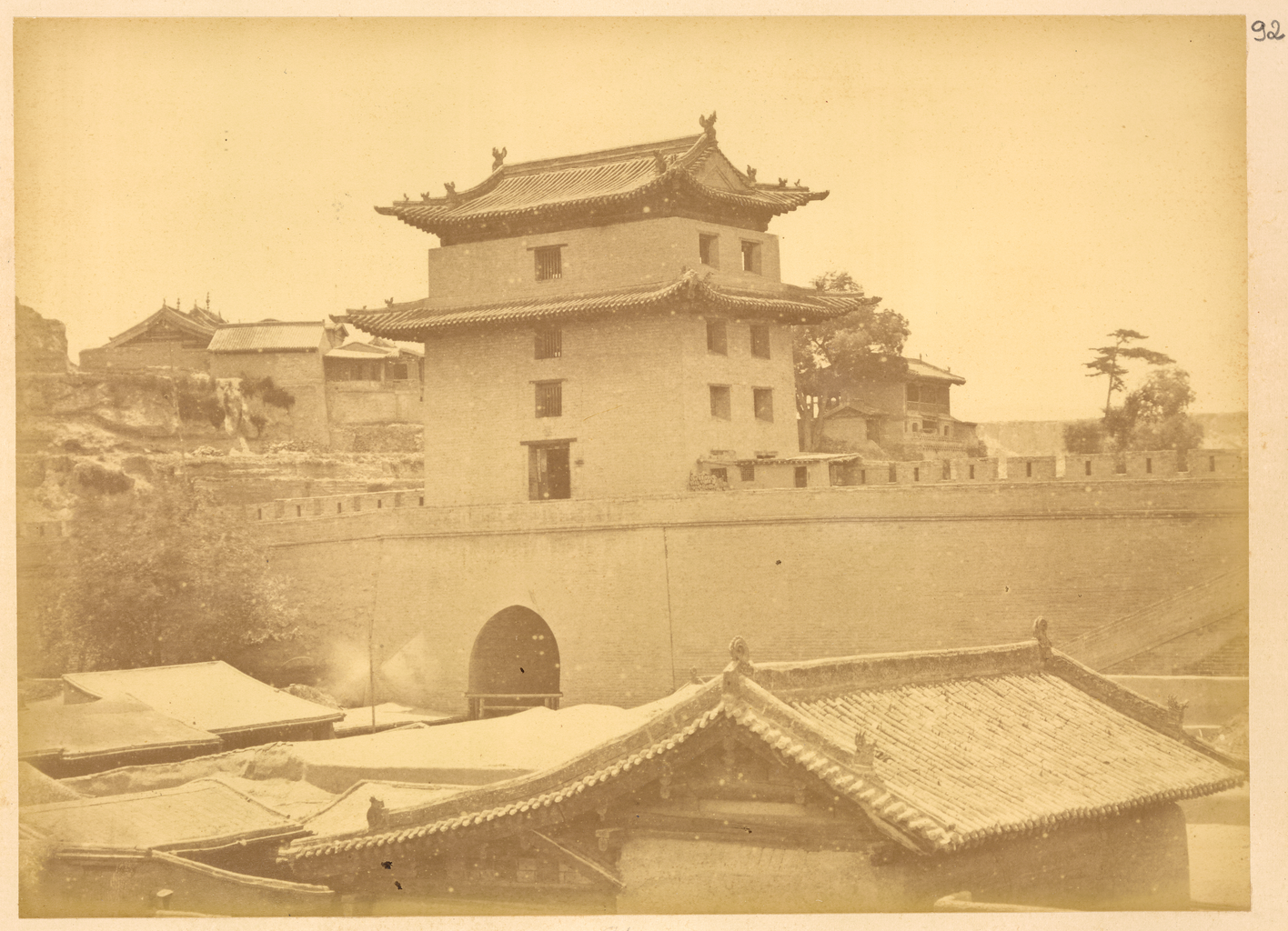
The West Gate (西关; Xīguān) of the old city wall in 1875. It has been demolished, although its busy neighborhood still bears its name.

In 1739 the seat of Lintao was transferred to Lanzhou, which was later made a superior prefecture called Lanzhou.

Lanzhou was badly damaged during the Dungan revolt in 1864–1875. Modern industry began to emerge in Lanzhou during the late Qing period. During the Self-Strengthening Movement, Zuo Zongtang, then governor-general of Shaan-Gan, established the Lanzhou Machinery Bureau and the Lanzhou Woollen Textile Bureau, among the earliest modern factories in northwestern China. Weapons and ammunition produced by the machinery bureau were used during the Qing's campaigns to reclaim Xinjiang from Yakub Beg.

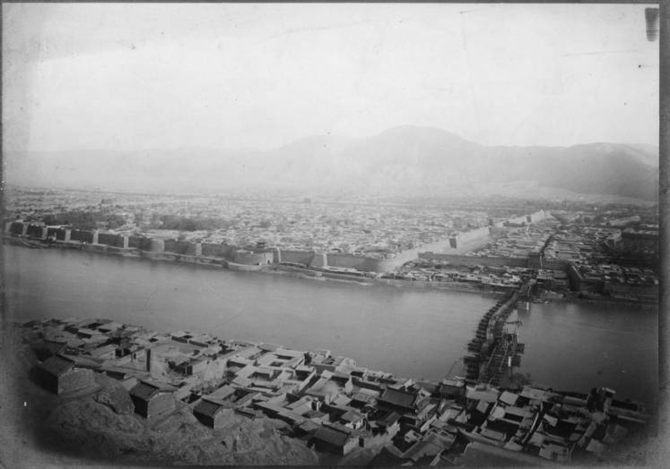
Lanzhou and the Zhongshan Bridge under construction in 1909 taken by Robert Sterling Clark

In the New Policies period, Gansu Industrial Promotion Factory was established to encourage the growth of weaving, tailoring, silk, glass, lacquerware and ironwork industries in the city. The need to modernize transportation on both banks of the Yellow River also prompted the provincial authority of Gansu to cooperate with German engineers in the construction of the first ever steel truss bridge over the Yellow River in 1909.

=== Republic of China ===
In the 1920s and 1930s it became a center of Soviet influence in northwestern China.

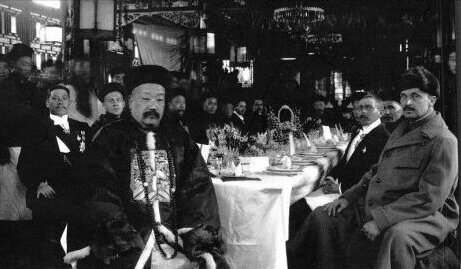
Viceroy of Shaan-Gan and Baron C. G. E. Mannerheim in Lanzhou, 1908

==== Second Sino-Japanese War-World War II ====
During the Second Sino-Japanese War (1937–1945) Lanzhou, linked with Xi'an by highway in 1935, became the terminus of the 3,200 km (2,000 mi) Chinese–Soviet highway, used as a route for Soviet supplies destined for the Xi'an area. This highway remained the primary traffic route of northwestern China until the completion of the railway from Lanzhou to Ürümqi, Xinjiang.

==== The Battle of Lanzhou ====
Lanzhou's old Donggang Airport, located near the city centre, was the primary entry point for combat aircraft provided to China under the Sino-Soviet Non-Aggression Pact, and along with other targets around Lanzhou, including civilian centers, were heavily bombed by the Imperial Japanese Army Air Force and Navy Air Force.

Many air battles were fought between the Chinese Air Force and the Imperial Japanese air forces over Lanzhou and surrounding regions from 1937 to 1945, particularly from 1938 to 1941 when the influx of Soviet war materials formed the primary support in China's War of Resistance against the Imperial Japanese invasion. Instances of major air-battles include an IJAAF raid consisting of 30 BR.20 and Ki-21 bombers against civilian targets in Lanzhou on 20 February 1939; 17th PS, 5th PG commander Capt. Cen Zeliu and his deputy commander Capt. Ma Guolian (Ma Kwok-Lim), a Canadian-Chinese volunteer for the Chinese Air Force, shot down the first two bombers in the battle, followed by two more downed as Capt. Cen led another attack on the third formation. They would be joined by pilots of the Soviet Volunteer Group led by Nikolay Garilov and the 15th PS led by Li Debiao, who would all shoot down five more of the Japanese bombers; the northern Chinese air-raid early-warning net headquarters in Xi'an observed 21 of the original 30 IJAAF bombers returning from Lanzhou.

As the Imperial Japanese forces were preparing for Operation Z against the United States and other allies in Southeast Asia and the Pacific by mid-1941, the IJANF were busy training new aircrews in live combat action across China for the upcoming war in the Pacific; on 22 May 1941, Lt. Gao Youxin of the 21st PS, 4th PG engaged an IJNAF raid on Lanzhou in an I-16 fighter aircraft, while avoiding confrontation against the Zero fighters, he shot down a Mitsubishi G3M bomber north of Lanzhou. On the ground, the KMT Muslim Generals Ma Hongkui and Ma Bufang protected Lanzhou with their cavalry troops, putting up such resistance that the Japanese never captured Lanzhou.

=== The People's Republic ===
On 20th August 1949, the First Field Army of the People's Liberation Army, under the command of Peng Dehuai, began the Battle of Lanzhou during what was one of the most intense campaigns in the Northwestern theatre of the Chinese Civl War, and formed an encirclement of the city from the east, west, and south. By 26th August, most of Ma Bufang's Nationalist and Ma clique forces had been defeated, and the battle ended with the PLA's entry into the city and Ma's retreat to Xining.

Following the establishment of the People's Republic of China, Lanzhou was included in the country's programme of large-scale industrial development. Owing to its position as a major transport hub in northwestern China, its proximity to oil and mineral-rich areas such as Yumen, as well as its strategic along the Yellow River, Lanzhou was designated as one of the country's key centres of industrial development during the First Five-Year Plan. Seven of the 156 major industrial projects built with Soviet assistance were planned for Lanzhou, while a further 17 of the 694 centrally designated large-scale construction projects were located in the city.

==== Industrial boom ====
The vacuum distillation unit of Lanzhou Refinery

Between 1953 and 1957, construction began on 357 industrial projects in Lanzhou, and by the end of the 1st Five Year Plan in 1957, the number of industrial enterprises in the city had risen to 449, fundamentally shifting Lanzhou from its earlier reliance on traditional handcrafts and commerce toward a heavy-industrial economy centred on petroleum, chemicals, machinery, and electric power.

Many of the major projects were concentrated in the western part of the city, particularly in Xigu District. Large enterprises including the Lanzhou Refinery, chemical industry, petrochemical machinery, and general machinery works were successively built and brought into operation. The Lanzhou Refinery and Lanzhou Chemical Industry Company subsequently became major early centres of China's oil refining and petrochemical industries, which in turn had transformed Xigu from a rural backwater into an integrated industrial district widely acclaimed as "the first petrochemical industrial city of the PRC".

At the same time, Lanzhou also became part of the early development of China's nuclear industry. In 1958, Plant 504, the country's first uranium enrichment plant, began its construction in Lanzhou's Xigu District, adding nuclear fuel production to the city's growing industrial base.

The initation of the Third Front campaign further since the mid-1960s further accelerated Lanzhou's industrialization process. Between 1965 and 1975, more than 20 large and medium-sized industrial enterprises were established in the city, 37 existing enterprises were expanded or reconstructed, and 11 major factories were relocated to Lanzhou from northeastern and coastal China. Through the cumulative investment of the 1st and 2nd Five-Year Plan, and the Third Front period, industry came to dominate Lanzhou's economy. By 1965, secondary sector accounted for more than 80 percent of the city's local economic output. Lanzhou was thereby transformed from an inland trade centre into one of western China's leading industrial cities.

== Geography ==
At 1,600 metres (5,200 ft) above sea level, Lanzhou lies in China's northwest geographical center. The metropolitan area covers more than 20 square kilometres (7.7 sq mi) of urbanisation along the southern banks of the Yellow River, which flows through from west to east. The Qilian Ranges, Mt. Pingliang, and Mt. Kongtong are located on the south and north sides of the city.

Lanzhou is situated on the upper reaches of the Yellow River where it emerges from the mountains and has been a center since early times, being at the southern end of the route leading via the Hexi Corridor across Central Asia. It commands the approaches to the ancient capital area of Chang'an (modern Xi'an) in Shaanxi province from both the west and the northwest, as well as the area of Qinghai Lake via the upper waters of the Yellow River and its tributaries.

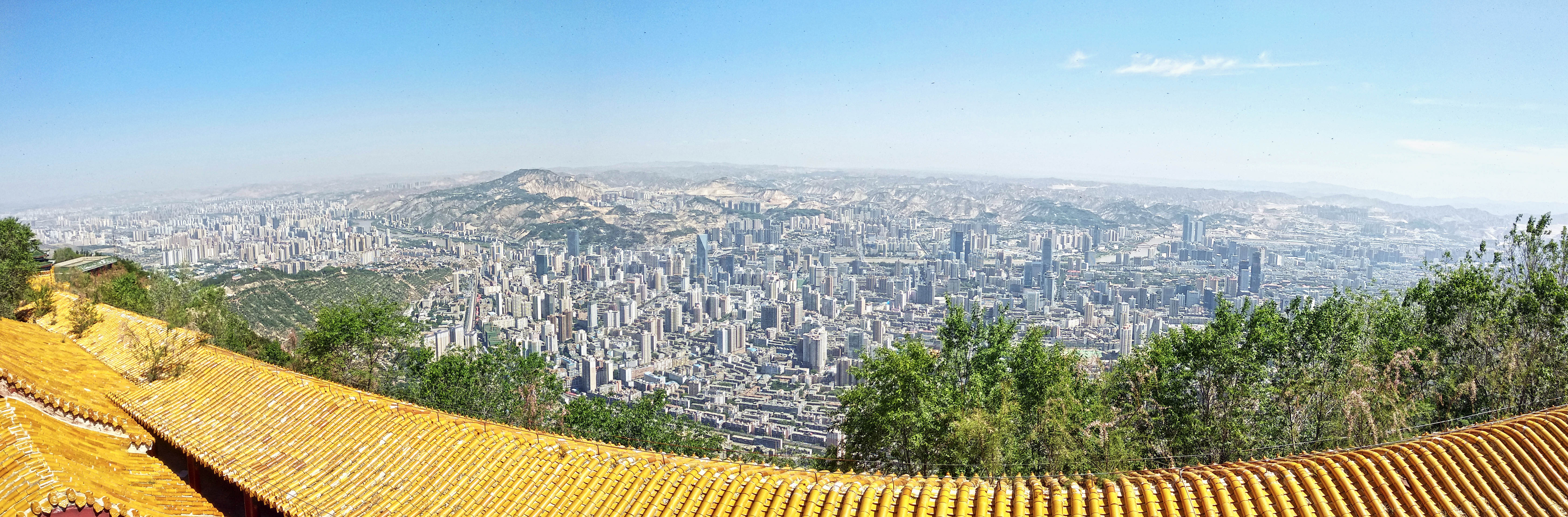
Panorama of Chengguan District (city centre), seen from the Lanshan mountain park.

=== Climate ===
Lanzhou is situated in the temperate zone and has a semi-arid climate (Köppen BSk) with hot summers and cold and very dry winters. In the urban core, based on 1971–2000 normals, the monthly 24-hour average temperature ranges from −4.1 °C (24.6 °F) in January to 23.4 °C (74.1 °F) in July. The mean annual temperature is 10.9 °C (51.6 °F), while annual rainfall is 309 millimetres (12.2 in), almost all of which falls from May to October. The winters are so dry that snowfall is sometimes restricted to fall and spring. With monthly percent possible sunshine ranging from 47 percent in September to 57 percent in April, sunshine is generous but not abundant, as the city receives 2,350 hours of bright sunshine annually.

Climate data for Lanzhou, elevation 1,517 m (4,977 ft), (1991–2020 normals, extremes 1951–present)
Month	Jan	Feb	Mar	Apr	May	Jun	Jul	Aug	Sep	Oct	Nov	Dec	Year
Record high °C (°F)	17.1 (62.8)	21.0 (69.8)	29.0 (84.2)	34.6 (94.3)	35.5 (95.9)	36.8 (98.2)	39.8 (103.6)	37.3 (99.1)	34.4 (93.9)	30.5 (86.9)	20.3 (68.5)	16.5 (61.7)	39.8 (103.6)
Mean daily maximum °C (°F)	2.3 (36.1)	7.6 (45.7)	14.1 (57.4)	20.7 (69.3)	24.9 (76.8)	28.6 (83.5)	30.2 (86.4)	28.8 (83.8)	23.6 (74.5)	17.5 (63.5)	10.3 (50.5)	3.5 (38.3)	17.7 (63.8)
Daily mean °C (°F)	−4.1 (24.6)	0.6 (33.1)	7.0 (44.6)	13.2 (55.8)	17.7 (63.9)	21.7 (71.1)	23.4 (74.1)	22.2 (72.0)	17.2 (63.0)	10.7 (51.3)	3.5 (38.3)	−2.9 (26.8)	10.9 (51.5)
Mean daily minimum °C (°F)	−8.4 (16.9)	−4.3 (24.3)	1.6 (34.9)	7.2 (45.0)	11.5 (52.7)	15.8 (60.4)	17.9 (64.2)	16.9 (62.4)	12.6 (54.7)	6.1 (43.0)	−0.9 (30.4)	−7.0 (19.4)	5.7 (42.4)
Record low °C (°F)	−21.1 (−6.0)	−17.6 (0.3)	−11.6 (11.1)	−5.7 (21.7)	−0.1 (31.8)	5.7 (42.3)	9.8 (49.6)	8.6 (47.5)	1.6 (34.9)	−7.1 (19.2)	−12.3 (9.9)	−19.7 (−3.5)	−21.1 (−6.0)
Average precipitation mm (inches)	1.7 (0.07)	3.0 (0.12)	6.7 (0.26)	16.3 (0.64)	39.0 (1.54)	44.0 (1.73)	63.5 (2.50)	66.0 (2.60)	43.7 (1.72)	21.7 (0.85)	2.7 (0.11)	0.7 (0.03)	309 (12.17)
Average precipitation days (≥ 0.1 mm)	2.4	2.4	3.7	5.8	7.8	8.9	10.7	10.1	9.9	6.5	2.1	1.0	71.3
Average snowy days	4.9	4.4	3.3	0.9	0.1	0	0	0	0	1.0	3.1	2.9	20.6
Average relative humidity (%)	51	46	42	40	44	48	55	58	63	63	58	54	52
Mean monthly sunshine hours	149.7	173.1	210.3	226.0	245.1	234.0	239.6	226.6	173.2	173.6	155.5	143.1	2,349.8
Percentage possible sunshine	48	56	56	57	56	54	54	55	47	51	51	48	53
Source 1: China Meteorological Administration
Source 2: Weather China

=== Environmental problems ===
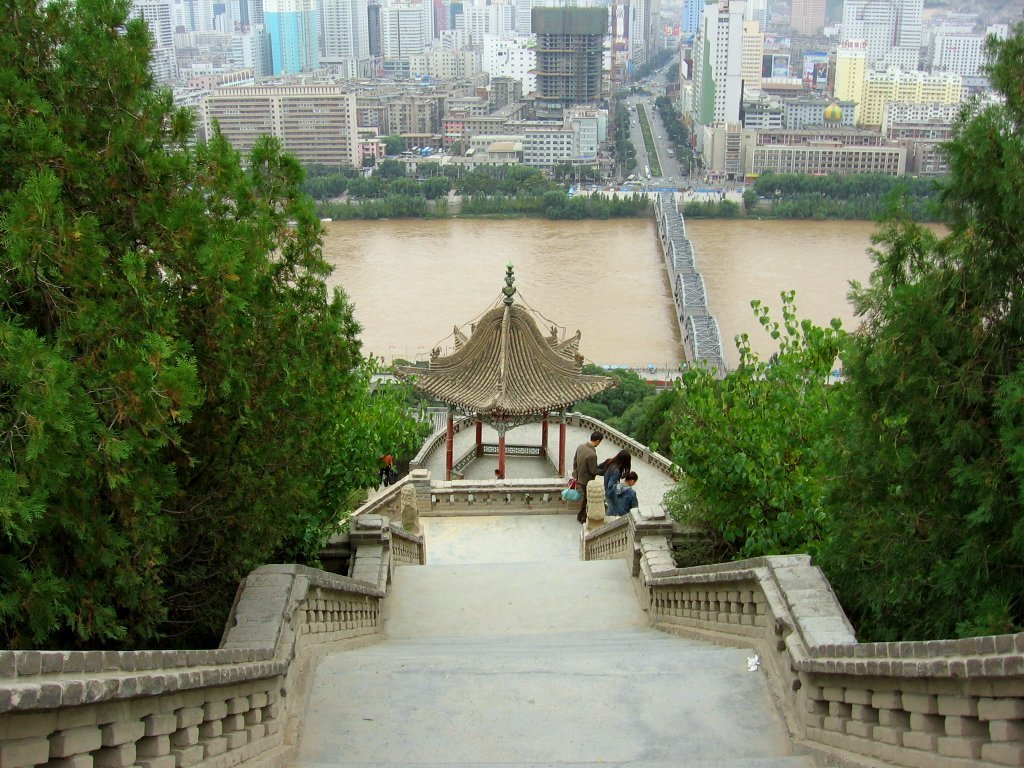
View on Zhongshan Bridge from Baita Mountain Park

The city is located in a narrow and curved river valley with surrounding mountains causing it to be hemmed in blocking a free flow of air. According to the National Environmental Analysis released by Tsinghua University and The Asian Development Bank in January 2013, Lanzhou was among the ten most air-polluted cities in the world. Air quality reportedly was so poor that at times one could not see Lanshan, the mountain rising up along the south side of the city. Lanzhou is also the home of many factories, including some involved in petroleum processing, and suffers from large dust storms kicked up from the Gobi Desert, especially in the winter and spring. In 2011, using Chinese statistics, the World Health Organization reported that Lanzhou had the worst air quality among eleven western Chinese cities. Its annual mean PM10 μg/m^{3} of 150 is 7 times the safe level established by the World Health Organization. It was worse than Beijing with its reading of 121.

Since then, authorities have taken measures to improve air quality, which have largely been successful. "Thirteen polluting enterprises with excessive capacity have been closed, more than 200 highly polluting enterprises were suspended in winter, and 78 industrial enterprises have moved to an industrial park outside the city." In 2015 it was awarded China's climate progress title. As a city once unable to be spotted from satellites, Lanzhou has taken various measures to combat air pollution in recent years, having reduced its Air Pollution Index at the fastest speed across China. According to the 2018 WHO database, of 2700 towns listed, Lanzhou has the 158th highest level of PM 2.5 pollution, with an average of 54 micrograms per cubic meter (twice that of Milan). The large particle PM10 remains high, at 132 micrograms per cubic meter, in part as a result of sand storms.

The reach of the Yellow River at Lanzhou carries a high load of silt, giving the river its characteristic muddy appearance; however water quality in this reach is better than the "fetid outflow that barely passes for water two hours downstream" (2008). In recent years, several specimens of the endangered Chinese giant salamander have been found in and near the Yellow River in Lanzhou.

On April 11, 2014, Lanzhou officials advised residents not to drink tap water, because benzene levels were 20 times the national limit of 10 micrograms per liter. The city water supply suspected industrial chemical production to be the culprit, similar to what happened in the 2005 Jilin chemical plant explosions.

A brucellosis outbreak infecting humans took place in Lanzhou in 2020 after the Lanzhou Biopharmaceutical Plant involved in vaccine production accidentally pumped out the bacteria into the atmosphere in exhaust air, due to use of expired desinfectant, and affecting over 3,000 people.

=== Earthquakes ===
Lanzhou experiences earthquakes regularly, although usually at low intensities. In 1920 a large earthquake was experienced killing more than 100,000 people in Ningxia and Eastern Gansu province, although only 42 were killed in Lanzhou itself, the low number being attributed to the strong yet flexible nature of the wooden buildings in the city. Lanzhou was also affected by 2008 Sichuan earthquake in 2008.

== Demographics ==
As of the 2020 Chinese census, Lanzhou surpassed 4 million population for the first time, with a total population of 4,359,446 inhabitants and 3,042,863 in the built-up (or metro) area of 1,112.9 square kilometres (429.7 sq mi) made of the 4 central urban districts (Chengguan, Qilihe, Anning and Xigu District). Lanzhou New Area, near the airport and Honggu Districts are not yet conurbated. The growth increased significantly after a period of slower growth. The strong growth has been attributed to parents seeking better education opportunities for their children, retired migrant workers returning to Gansu, improved services in the city and government policies.

== Sport ==
The 14,000-capacity Northwest Minzu University Stadium is one of the main sports venues in the city. It is mostly used for football games. A new sports center complex, including a stadium with a capacity of 60,000 spectators and a swimming hall, is under development.

Lanzhou previously had a professional soccer team named Gansu Tianma from 1999 to 2003.The team played in Chinese Football Association Yi League from 1999 to 2001 and bought a position in the Jia League from Tianjin Lifei. The team relocated to Ningbo, Zhejiang and changed their name to Ningbo Yaoma in 2003. The team later relegated to China League Two in 2004 and became Dongguan Dongcheng after moving to Dongguan, Guangdong.

Former England international Paul Gascoigne played four games in both a playing and coaching role for Gansu in 2003, scoring two goals, before returning to England after falling out with the club, as his mental state meant that he had to return to America for treatment against drink and depression.

== Administrative divisions ==
Map
Name	Simplified Chinese	Hanyu Pinyin	Population (2010 census)	Area (km^{2})	Density (/km^{2})
City proper
Chengguan District	城关区	Chéngguān Qū	1,278,745	220	5,812.47
Qilihe District	七里河区	Qīlǐhé Qū	561,020	397	1,413.14
Xigu District	西固区	Xīgù Qū	364,050	385	945.58
Anning District	安宁区	Ānníng Qū	288,510	86	3,354.76
Suburban
Honggu District	红古区	Hónggǔ Qū	136,101	575	236.69
Lanzhou New Area^{[A]}	兰州新区	Lánzhōu Xīnqū	100,000	806	124
Rural
Yongdeng County	永登县	Yǒngdēng Xiàn	418,789	6,090	68.76
Gaolan County	皋兰县	Gāolán Xiàn	131,785	2,556	51.55
Yuzhong County	榆中县	Yúzhōng Xiàn	437,163	3,362	130.03

^{A} On August 20, 2012, Lanzhou New Area was approved by the State Council of China's Central Government. In 2019, Lanzhou New Area was formally established as a county-level division of Lanzhou, its area being split off from Yongdeng and Gaolan. The updated area and population of Yongdeng and Gaolan are not yet reflected in the table.

== Tourism ==
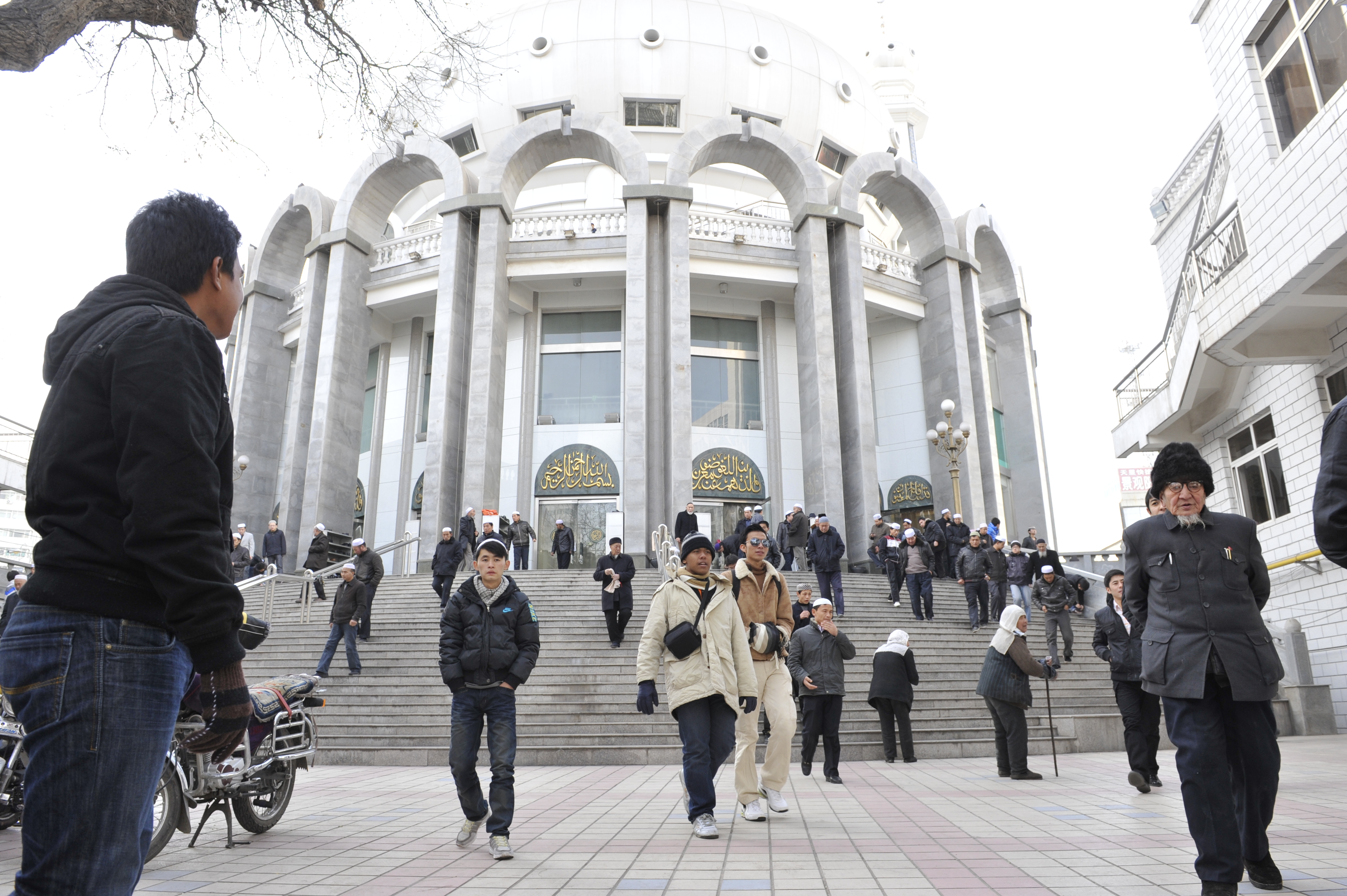
Xiguan Mosque after a Friday prayer

Lanzhou serves as the primary transportation and tourism gateway to Gansu Province and the Hexi Corridor, providing access to historical sites like the Bingling Temple Grottoes.

- The Five Spring Mountain Park (五泉山公园), located on the northern side of Gaolan Mountain, is renowned for its five springs and numerous Buddhist temples, featuring many ancient architectural sites.
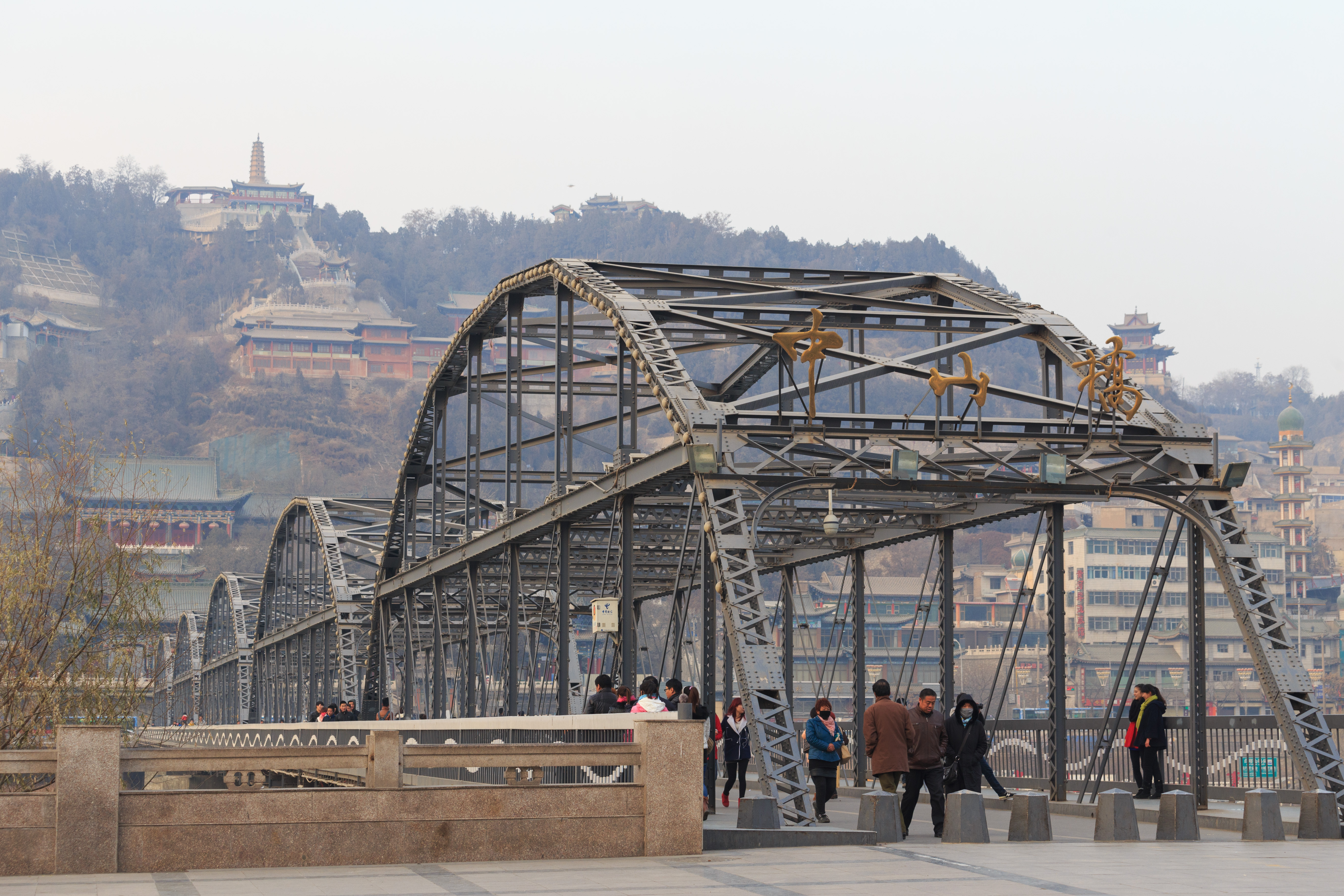
- Zhongshan Bridge
  The Zhongshan Bridge (中山桥) was the first permanent bridge over the Yellow River.
- Baita Mountain Park (白塔山公园) was built close to the mountains at an elevation of 1,700 metres (5,600 ft) and opened in 1958 across Zhongshan Bridge.
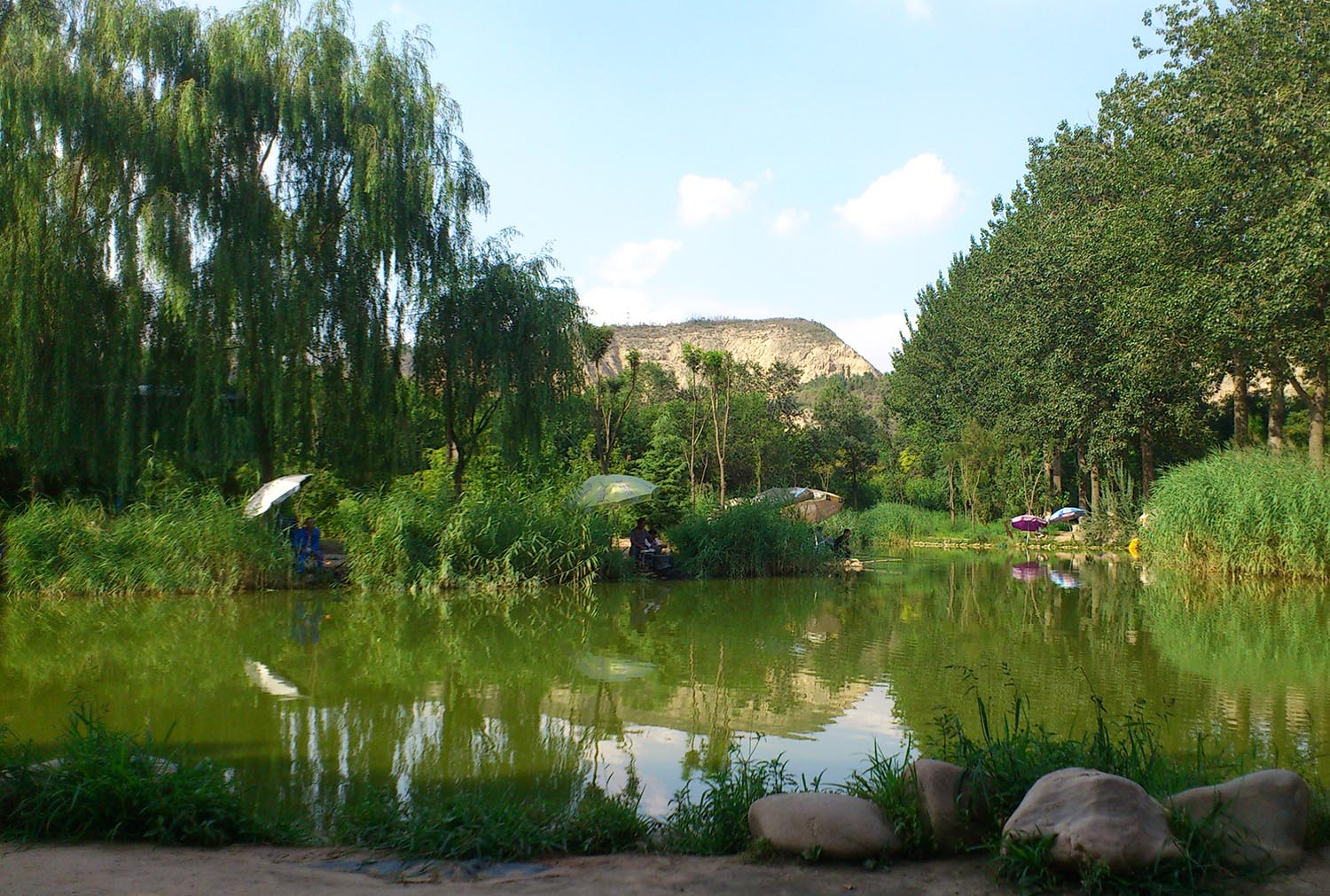
- Lanzhou Botanical Garden pond
  The Lanzhou Botanical Garden (兰州植物园), located in the Anning District, has a large variety of trees, flowers and other plants.
- Xiguan Mosque (西关清真寺) is one of the larger mosques in China.
- Xinglong Mountain (兴隆山) is covered with thick pine forests and scattered with colorful temples.
- Lutusi ancient government (鲁土司衙门旧址), a large complex of ancient governmental buildings.

=== Museums ===
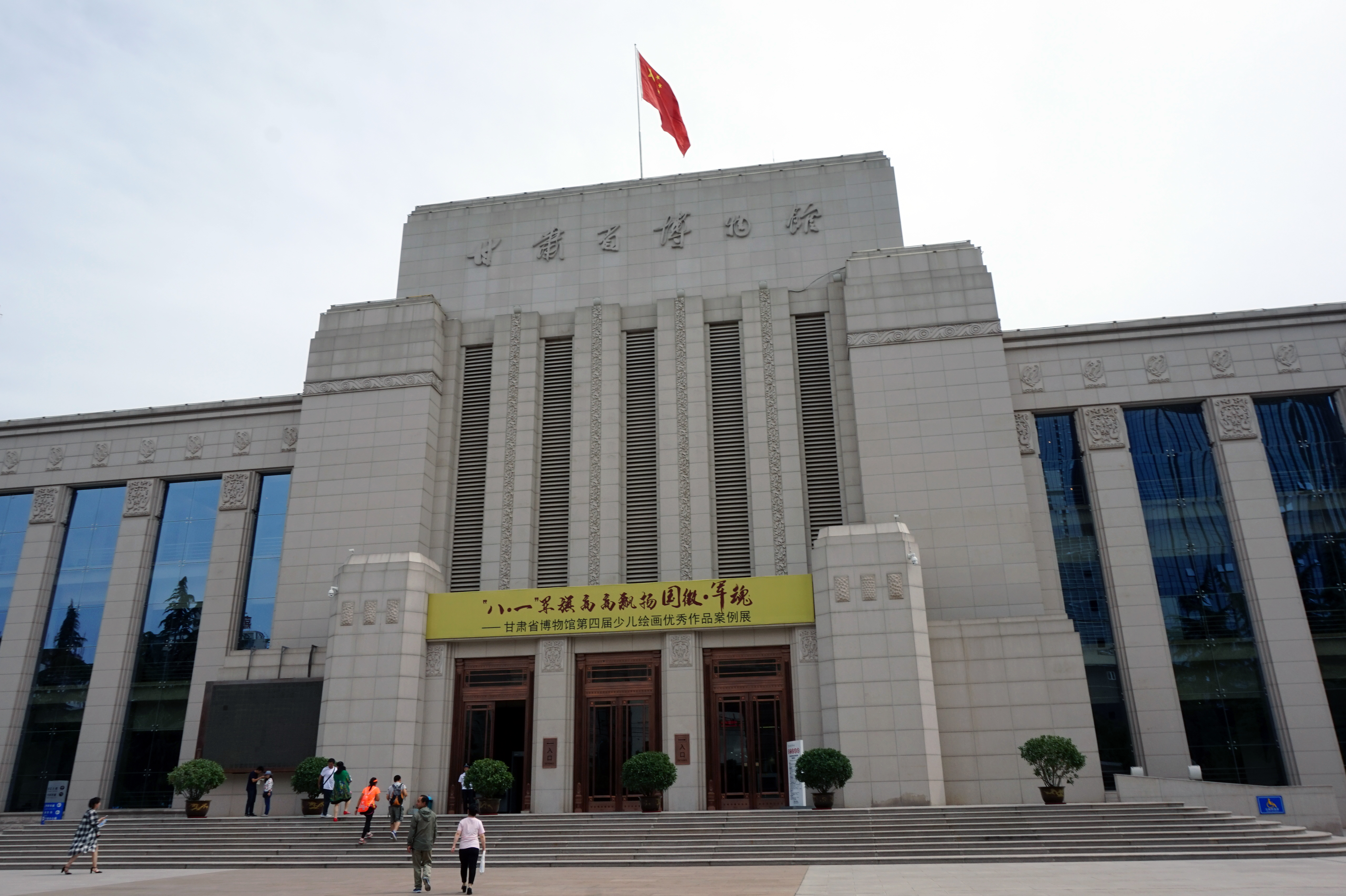
Gansu Provincial Museum

- Gansu Provincial Museum (甘肃省博物馆), displays archaeological and fossil finds from Gansu and exhibitions on Gansu's history.
- Lanzhou Museum (兰州市博物馆), is an important cultural unit on the Silk Road. As of October 2017, the collection contains more than 13,000 pieces of collections, including pottery, porcelain, bronze, calligraphy, coins, jade, stoneware, etc. There are 52 national first-class cultural relics, 78 national second-level cultural relics and 682 national third-level cultural relics.
- Gansu Art Museum (甘肃艺术馆), Providing a broad display and external communication platform for artists.
- Lanzhou City Planning Exhibition Hall (兰州市规划展览馆), showing the profound Yellow River culture of Lanzhou and integrating indoor exhibition, architectural concept and urban characteristics.
- Lanzhou Painted Pottery Museum (兰州彩陶博物馆), The total number of collections is 250, including 50 precious cultural relics, it displays the painted pottery civilization represented by the cultural pottery of Majiayao.
- Gansu Science and Technology Museum (甘肃科技博物馆) sound, light, electricity and other high-tech means will be fully adopted, and the way of teaching and learning will enable visitors to embrace modern science in a pleasant atmosphere. (Note: sound, light, electricity and other high-tech means will be fully adopted, and the way of teaching and learning will enable visitors to embrace modern science in a pleasant atmosphere.)

== Economy ==
Lanzhou Center commercial complex

Since 1949 Lanzhou has been transformed from the capital of a poverty-stricken province into the center of a major industrial area. It was one of the first cities in China to industrialize, as a focus of the First and Second Five-Year Plans.

The GDP per capita of Lanzhou was 25,566 (RMB) (US$3,681) in 2008, ranking it at number 134 among 659 Chinese cities. In 2015, the GDP per capita had grown to 57,191 RMB (US$9,182.28) and the city ranked at place 100 for total GDP of Chinese cities.

=== Institutions ===
The International Solar Energy Center (UNIDO-ISEC) is located in Lanzhou's Chengguan district.

Headquarters of UNIDO-ISEC

=== Natural resources ===
- Minerals: coal, gold, silver, zinc, nickel, manganese, clay, and dolomite
- Hydropower

There is a thermal generating plant supplied with coal from fields in Qinghai. In addition, there is a hydroelectric station at Zhulama Gorge in Gansu, and a large multipurpose dam has been built in the Liujia Gorge on the Yellow River above Lanzhou.

=== Industry ===
Main industries include textile mills, rubber processing and fertilizer plants, an oil refinery, petrochemicals, machinery, and metallurgical industry.

Gansu has one of the largest oil refineries in the country and Lanzhou itself is the center of the province's petrochemical industry. The refinery is linked to the fields at Yumen by pipeline. It also manufactures equipment for the oil industry.

Lanzhou has a large textile industry, particularly noted for the production of woolen and leather goods. In addition, Lanzhou produces locomotives and rolling stock for the northwestern railways, as well as machine tools and mining equipment. Aluminum products, industrial chemicals, and fertilizers are produced on a large scale, and there is a large rubber industry. Copper is mined in nearby Gaolan.

Lanzhou has been one of the centers of China's national nuclear power industry since the 1960s, when Lanzhou uranium enrichment plant was completed.

=== Agriculture ===
Lanzhou is the collecting center and market for agricultural produce and livestock from a wide area.

- Spring wheat, vegetables, beans, oil-boiling, melon, peaches, and tobacco
- Roses and lilies

== Transportation ==
=== Airport ===
Lanzhou Zhongchuan Airport is the main airport serving Lanzhou, it is located 70 km (43 mi) north of Lanzhou. It opened for public service in 1970.

The airport offers direct connections to over 70 international and domestic destinations.

=== Railway ===
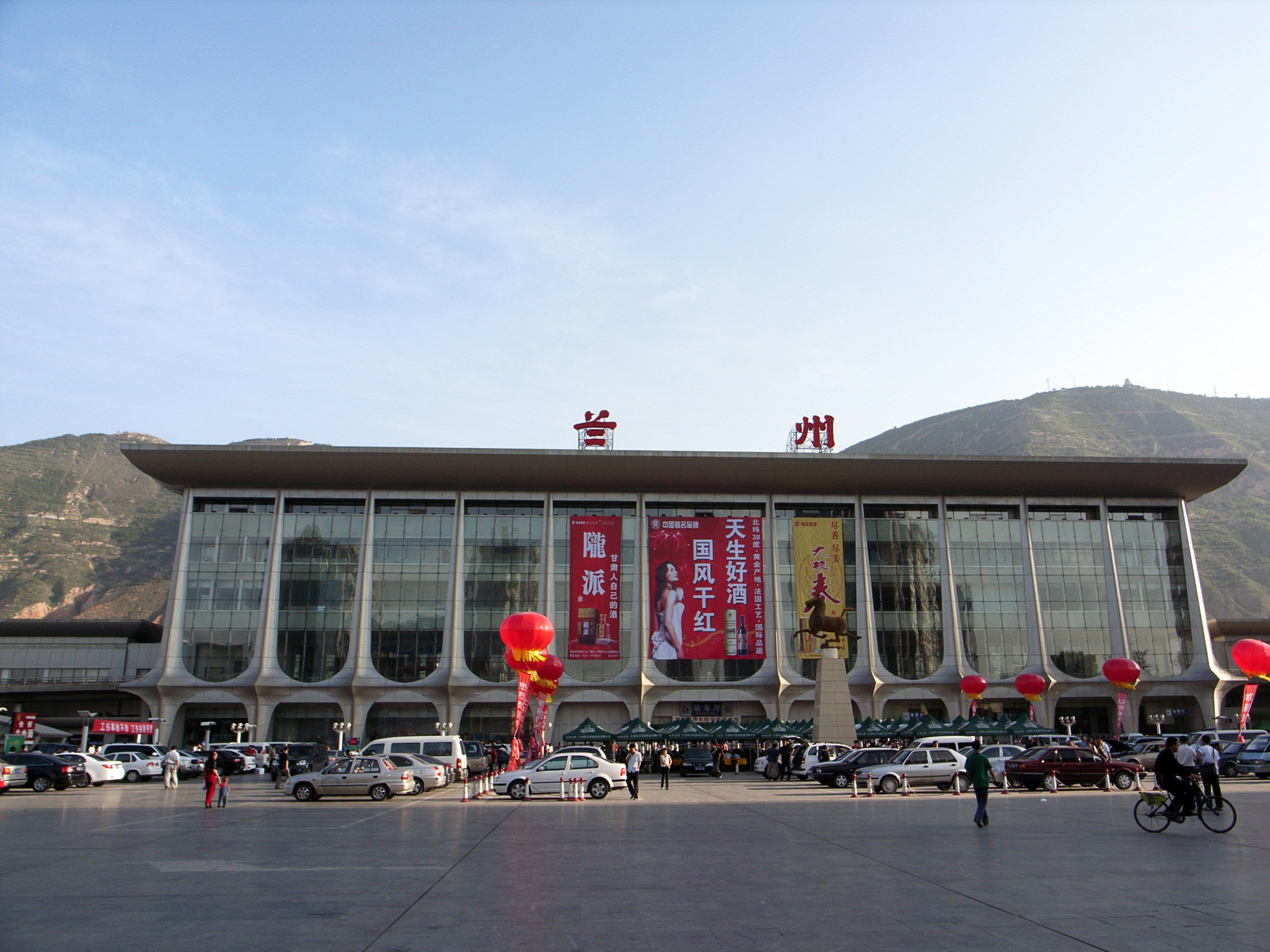
Lanzhou Railway Station

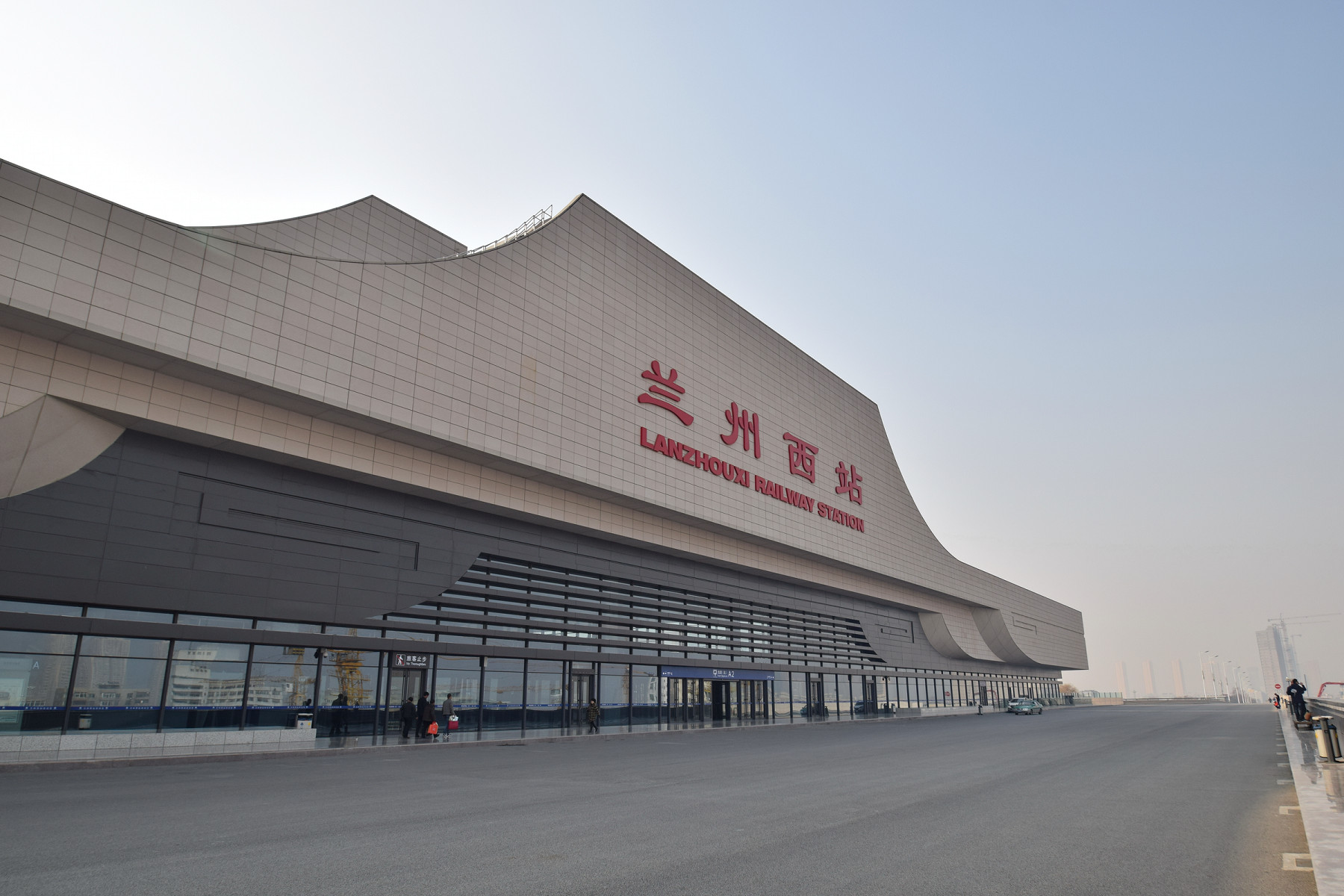
Lanzhou West Railway Station

==== Subway ====
Lanzhou was the second city in northwest China to announce the construction of a subway line, in August 2012. The urban railway network, Lanzhou Metro, is planned to consist of six subway lines running 207 km (129 mi). The first line, which is completely underground, opened in June 2019. Lanzhou Metro Line 2 (First-stage project), opened in June 2023. Passengers can transfer between Line 1 and Line 2 at Dongfanghong Square Station and Wulipu Station.

==== Regional ====
Lanzhou Railway Station is a major railway hub of western China. Every day over 100 passenger trains originate or pass via this station. It is a vital focal point connecting the western provinces with the east. Lanzhou Railway Station is located on Huochezhan Dong Lu, in Chengguan district. Lanzhou West Railway Station is the city's second major railway station, offering connection to high-speed rail services.

Lanzhou Railway Station has the following railway connections:

- Longhai Railway to the east (Xi'an, Zhengzhou, Lianyungang), with connection to the main railway of eastern China supporting direct trains to Beijing, Shanghai, etc. Finished in 1953, it was the first railway to reach Lanzhou.
- Lanxin Railway to the west and northwest (with direct trains to western Gansu and Ürümqi, and further connections to other points in Xinjiang and to Kazakhstan)
- Lanqing Railway to the west and southwest, with direct service to Xining and Lhasa
- Chongqing–Lanzhou railway to southeast, with direct service to Chongqing and Guangyuan
- A line to the north and northeast, with direct service to Yinchuan and Baotou
- Lanzhou–Zhongchuan Airport Intercity Railway between Lanzhou Railway Station and Lanzhou Zhongchuan International Airport.
- Lanhe Railway (under construction) to Linxia and Hezuo.

==== High speed rail ====
New high-speed passenger-only railways are completed both toward the east (the Xuzhou–Lanzhou high-speed railway), the west (the Lanzhou–Xinjiang high-speed railway) and the north (the Yinchuan–Lanzhou high-speed railway). These services only stop at Lanzhou West Railway Station. The Sichuan–Qinghai railway, which is designed for a top speed of 200 km/h (120 mph) to 250 km/h (160 mph), is under construction.

==== Freight rail ====
Lanzhou forms an important link in one of the routes of the Eurasian Land Bridge and also provides rail access to Qinghai, Xinjiang and Tibet further to the west. A large rail freight terminal has recently been constructed to accommodate increasing volumes of rail freight and Lanzhou is home to China's fourth largest marshalling yard.

Regular freight services connect Lanzhou to destinations including Chongqing, Hamburg, Almaty and Kathmandu.

=== Road network ===
In 2016, Lanzhou was ranked 4th of Chinese cities with the worst rush hour traffic jams; however, by 2017, after completion of an urban ring road, it dropped to 33rd place.

==== Highways ====
- G75 Lanzhou–Haikou Expressway
- G30 Lianyungang–Khorgas Expressway
- G6 Beijing–Lhasa Expressway
- G22 Qingdao–Lanzhou Expressway
- G2201 Lanzhou Ring Expressway
- China National Highway 212
- China National Highway 213
- China National Highway 312

=== Bus services ===
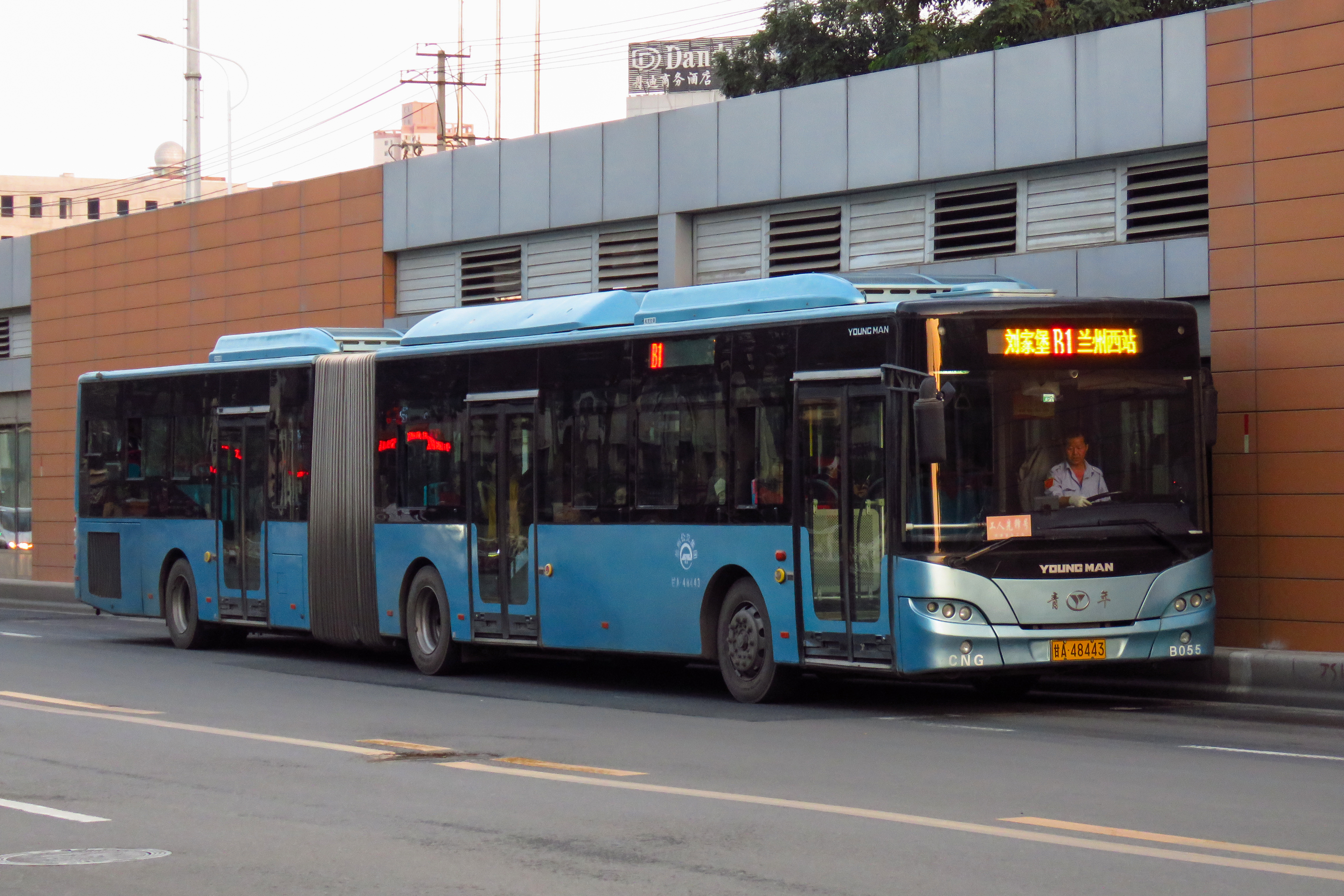
Lanzhou BRT

For long-distance buses, there are three major bus stations in the urban area, West Bus Station in Xiaoxihu neighbourhood, East Bus Station near Lanzhou Station and South Bus Station near G75 Lanzhou–Haikou Expressway terminus. Furthermore, there are a total of 132 local city bus lines. These have their main node station at Xiguan.

Lanzhou has a noted bus rapid transit system which opened in 2013 and won the city an honorable mention at the 2014 Sustainable Transport Awards.

== Media ==
- Gansu People's Press, in Lanzhou, publishes Duzhe, the most widely circulated magazine in China.
- Lanzhou Radio serves the Lhasa and Lanzhou province regions with news and music.
- Gansu Daily, newspaper for Gansu Province, has its editorial offices in Lanzhou.

== Culture ==
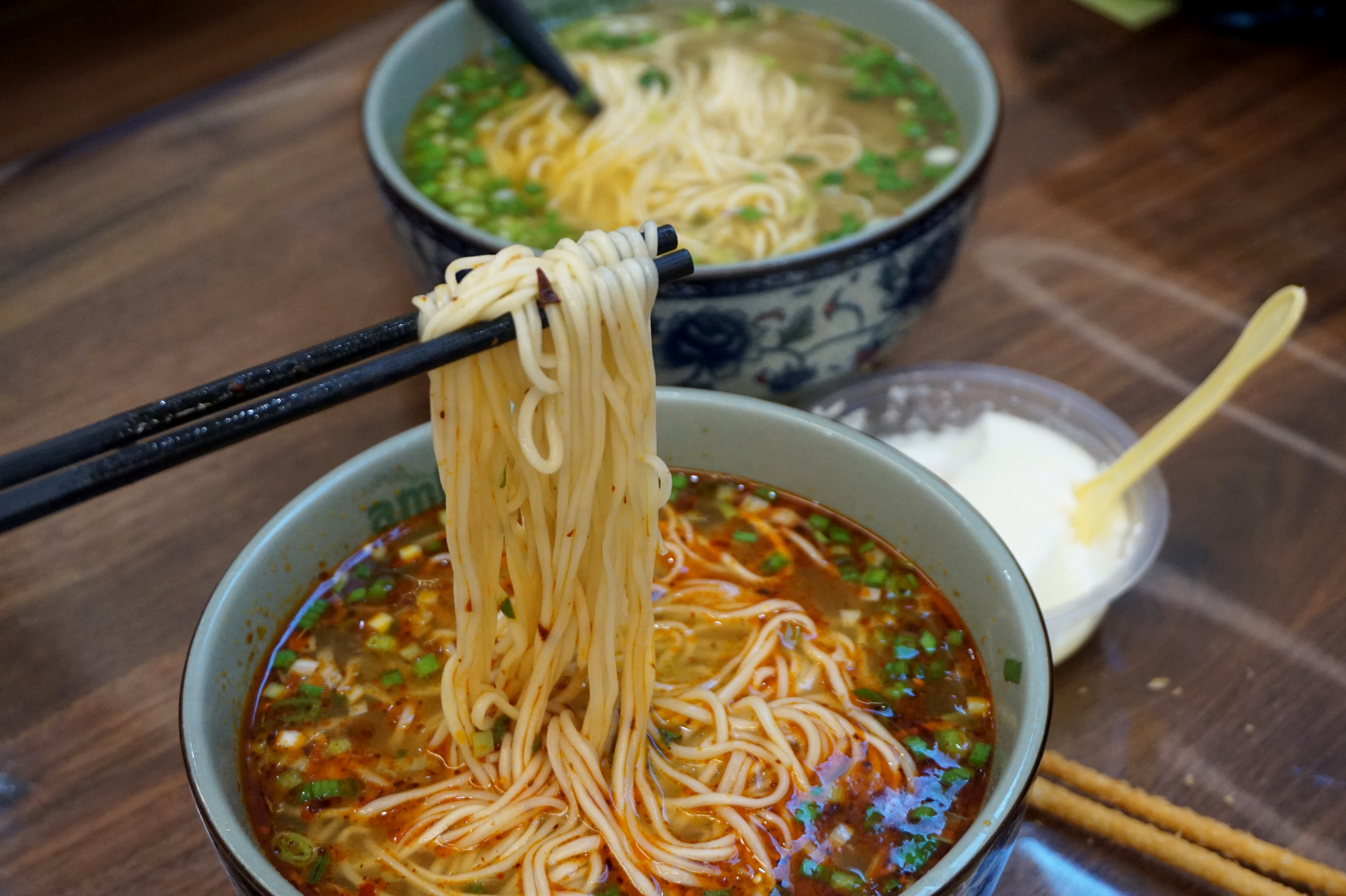
Lanzhou beef noodles

The city is the cultural centre of Gansu. It is home to many different ethnic groups and their respective cultures, but the most prominent three groups are the Han, Hui, and Zang.

- Chinese opera: Qinqiang opera (Gansu style): The most important form of folk opera in Lanzhou. Unlike Shaanxi Qinqiang opera, the Gansu style (Gan school) is more impassioned, rough, and higher pitch. It also reserved some unique performance skills such as "San Bian Zi" (Three Whips), "San Gou Zi" (Three Hooks), and "San Huo Cai" (Spraying Fire).
- Lanzhou Guzi (Lanzhou Drum Narrative): This is recognised as a National intangible cultural heritage of China. This type of opera is primarily performed in the Lanzhou dialect and the content largely comes from historical tales and folklore.
- Cuisine: Lanzhou beef noodles are well known throughout China. The city of Lanzhou is home to over 1,000 beef noodle restaurants. The noodles can be made in many shapes, such as "maoxi" (hair-thin), "xi" (thin), "erxi" (medium-thin), "jiuye" (leaf-like), and "kuang" (wide).
- Tian Peizi (Sweet Fermented Grains): This is a traditional dessert, fermented from oats or highland barley, it has a light aroma of rice wine.
- San Pao Tai (Three-Brewed Tea): Originating from the tea-horse trade during the Ming and Qing dynasties, and was shaped by the local Muslim community. Ingredients are usually Chunjian (Spring Tips) tea, longan, rock sugar, and wolfberries.
- The root of the lily, and many different kinds of mutton are important elements of Lanzhou's food culture.
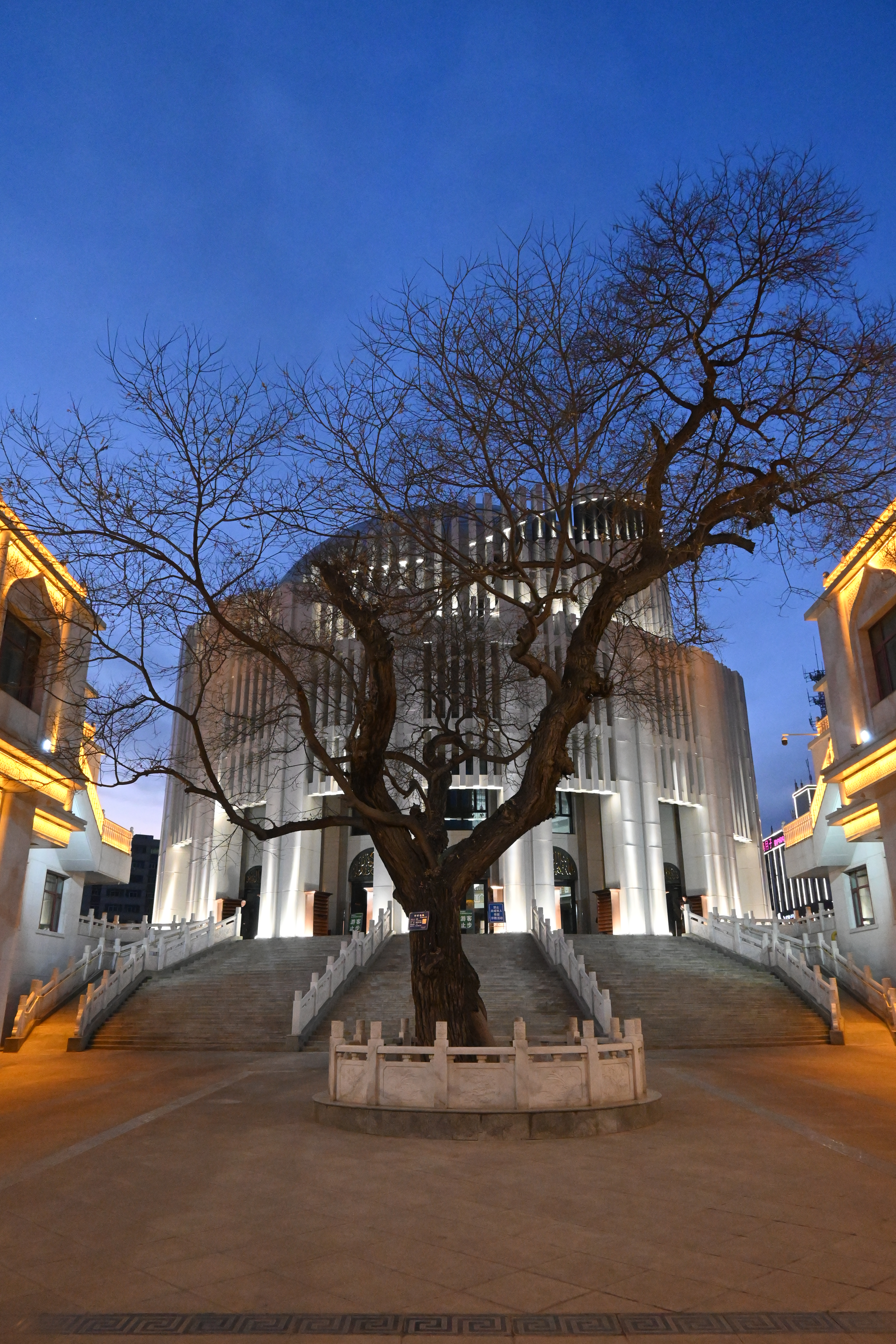
- Xiguan Mosque
  Islam in China: Xiguan Mosque, the mosque was constructed in the Ming dynasty and rebuilt in 1990. It occupies an area of 467 square metres (5,030 square feet) and is one of the most influential mosques in China. The architecture of the mosque predominantly reflects that of Arab architecture.
- The city is the seat of a currently vacant Roman Catholic diocese and was previously the center of a vicariate apostolic (Vicariate Apostolic of Northern Kan-Su).

== Colleges and universities ==
Lanzhou is a major center for scientific research and education in Northwestern China after Xi'an. The city is one of the top 50 major cities in the world by scientific research output as tracked by the Nature Index. The city is the seat of Lanzhou University, founded in 1909. The National Minorities Institute at Lanzhou and a branch of the Chinese Academy of Sciences are also located in the city. In particular, Northwest Normal University has been the key university at the provincial level, which has prepared over 100,000 teachers in schools across the province Gansu.

=== List ===
Note: Institutions without full-time bachelor's degree programs are not listed.

==== National level ====
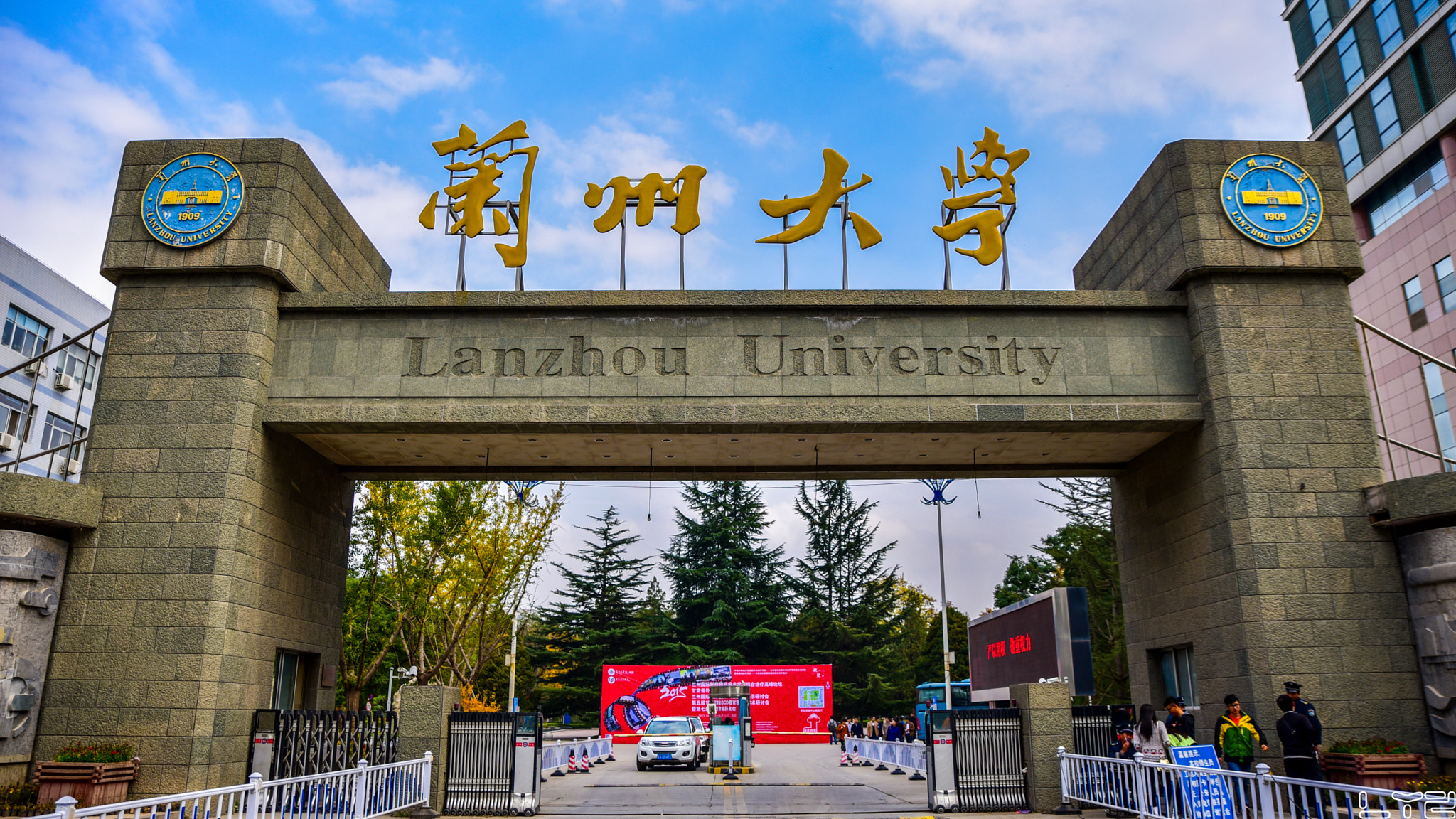
Lanzhou University

- Lanzhou University, founded 1909

==== Other public institutions ====
- Eastern Gansu University
- Gansu Agricultural University (甘肃农业大学), founded 1958
- Gansu University of Chinese Medicine (甘肃中医药大学), Formerly known as Gansu College of Traditional Chinese Medicine, it has contributed to Gansu's medical and health undertakings and social development.
- College of Politics and Law, Gansu (甘肃政法学院), Based in Gansu, radiating to the northwest, facing the country, actively serving local social development and establishment of the legal system.
- Lanzhou University of Arts and Science (兰州文理学院), Composed by the merger of Gansu Institute of Education and Gansu Union University in 2013.
- College of Technology, Lanzhou (兰州工业学院)
- Lanzhou City College (兰州城市学院), founded 1958
- Lanzhou University of Finance and Economics (兰州财经大学), The only financial and economic university in the three provinces of Gansu, Ningxia and Qinghai.
- Lanzhou Jiaotong University (兰州交通大学), founded 1958
- Lanzhou Medical College (兰州医学院) (Lanzhou Medical Institute) incorporated into Lanzhou University
- Lanzhou Niuroumian (Noodle with beef soup) Cultural Research Institute (兰州牛肉面文化研究所)
- Lanzhou University of Technology, (兰州理工大学), founded 1919 (formerly Gansu University of Technology)
- Northwest University for Nationalities (西北民族大学)
- Northwest Normal University (西北师范大学), founded 1902

== Healthcare ==
- People's Hospital of Gansu
- Second People's Hospital of Gansu (see Borden Memorial Hospital, predecessor)
- Third People's Hospital of Gansu
- First People's Hospital of Lanzhou
- Second People's Hospital of Lanzhou
- Lanzhou University First Hospital
- Lanzhou University Second Hospital
- General Military Hospital
- Lanzhou Military Hospital
- Lanzhou Heavy Ion Cancer Treatment Center, joint venture by Sheng De Group, the city government and Chinese Academy of Sciences' Institution of Modern Physics
- Gansu Tumor Hospital

== Sister cities ==
- Albuquerque, United States
- Akita, Japan (friendship city)
- Ashkhabad, Turkmenistan
- Chorley, England
- Penza, Russia
- Nouakchott, Mauritania
- Young Shire, Australia
- Hachinohe, Aomori, Japan since April 1998

== See also ==
- List of twin towns and sister cities in China
- Dunhuang
- Lanzhousaurus
