= Gansu University of Chinese Medicine =

University in Lanzhou, China

Gansu University of Chinese Medicine (Chinese: 甘肃中医药大学)
- Type: Public
- Established: 1978
- Location: No. 35, Dingxi East Road, Chengguan District, Lanzhou City, People's Republic of China
- Campus: Urban
- Website: www.gszy.edu.cn

Gansu University of Chinese Medicine, formerly known as "Gansu College of Traditional Chinese Medicine", is a public university in Lanzhou, capital of Gansu Province, China. Founded in 1978, the university is now jointly built by the People's Government of Gansu Province and the State Administration of Traditional Chinese Medicine, and offers undergraduate, master's and doctoral programs in Traditional Chinese Medicine. It is the only university of Chinese medicine in Northwest China with the authority to grant doctoral degrees.

== History ==
In 1978, the "Gansu College of Traditional Chinese Medicine" was founded in Lanzhou.

In 1989, the Tibetan Medicine Department was established.

In 2014, the Dingxi Normal College merged into the school.

In 2015, Gansu College of Traditional Chinese Medicine was renamed "Gansu University of Chinese Medicine", with approval from the Ministry of Education.

In 2016, it became co-built by the People's Government of Gansu Province and the State Administration of Traditional Chinese Medicine.

In 2018, the university signed a cooperation agreement with Shanghai University of Chinese Medicine.

In 2024, The university was selected as a "Gansu Provincial Base for the Promotion and Education of Traditional Chinese Medicine Culture".

== Current situation ==
Gansu University of Chinese Medicine is jointly established by the People's Government of Gansu Province and the State Administration of Traditional Chinese Medicine.

There are 19,715 full-time students (15,649 undergraduates, 3,588 master's students, 262 doctoral students and more than 120 international students). It is the only university of Chinese medicine in Northwest China with the authority to grant doctoral degrees.

The university is located in Lanzhou, capital city of Gansu Province of China. There are four campuses: Heping Campus, Wulipu Campus, Dingxi Campus and Gannan Campus; where the Heping Campus is the headquarters and covers an area of 1,050 acres, facing the Yellow River in the distance. There are 16 teaching institutions.

There are four directly affiliated hospitals and six non-directly affiliated hospitals. Gansu Provincial Hospital of Traditional Chinese Medicine, a Grade A tertiary hospital, is the first affiliated hospital of Gansu University of Chinese Medicine.

The university edits and publishes three Chinese academic journals: "甘肃中医药大学学报" (Journal of Gansu University of Traditional Chinese Medicine), "中医儿科杂志" (Journal of Pediatric Traditional Chinese Medicine) and "甘肃基层卫生" (Gansu Primary Health Care).

In the 2026 Shanghai Ranking, Gansu University of Chinese Medicine ranked 25 among China's universities of Chinese medicine.

== See also ==
- List of universities and colleges in Gansu
