= Lanzhou Radio =

Radio network in Gansu, China

Lanzhou Radio consists of four radio stations serving Lanzhou and the greater Gansu Province area.

== List of Lanzhou radio stations ==
Lanzhou Radio Stations
Frequency	Description
954 AM	News
97.3 FM	News
99.5 FM	Music
100.8 FM	Live (Talk)
