= Lanshan (Gansu) =

Mountain range in Gansu, China

Coordinates: 36°N 105°E

Lanshan Mountain

Geography
- Location: Gansu Province of China

Lanshan Mountains (Chinese: 兰山) is a mountain range along the northern shore of the Yellow River east of the capital Lanzhou of the Gansu province in northwestern China.

The area of the Lanshan Mountains played a prominent role in the history of early China, changing hands many times in the course of events. After the fall of the Han dynasty, a succession of states were located here: in the 4th century it was a capital of the independent state Earlier Liang, and from the 5th to the 11th century, it became a center for Buddhist study in China.
