= Xiguan Mosque =

Mosque in Lanzhou, Gansu, China

- 西关清真寺
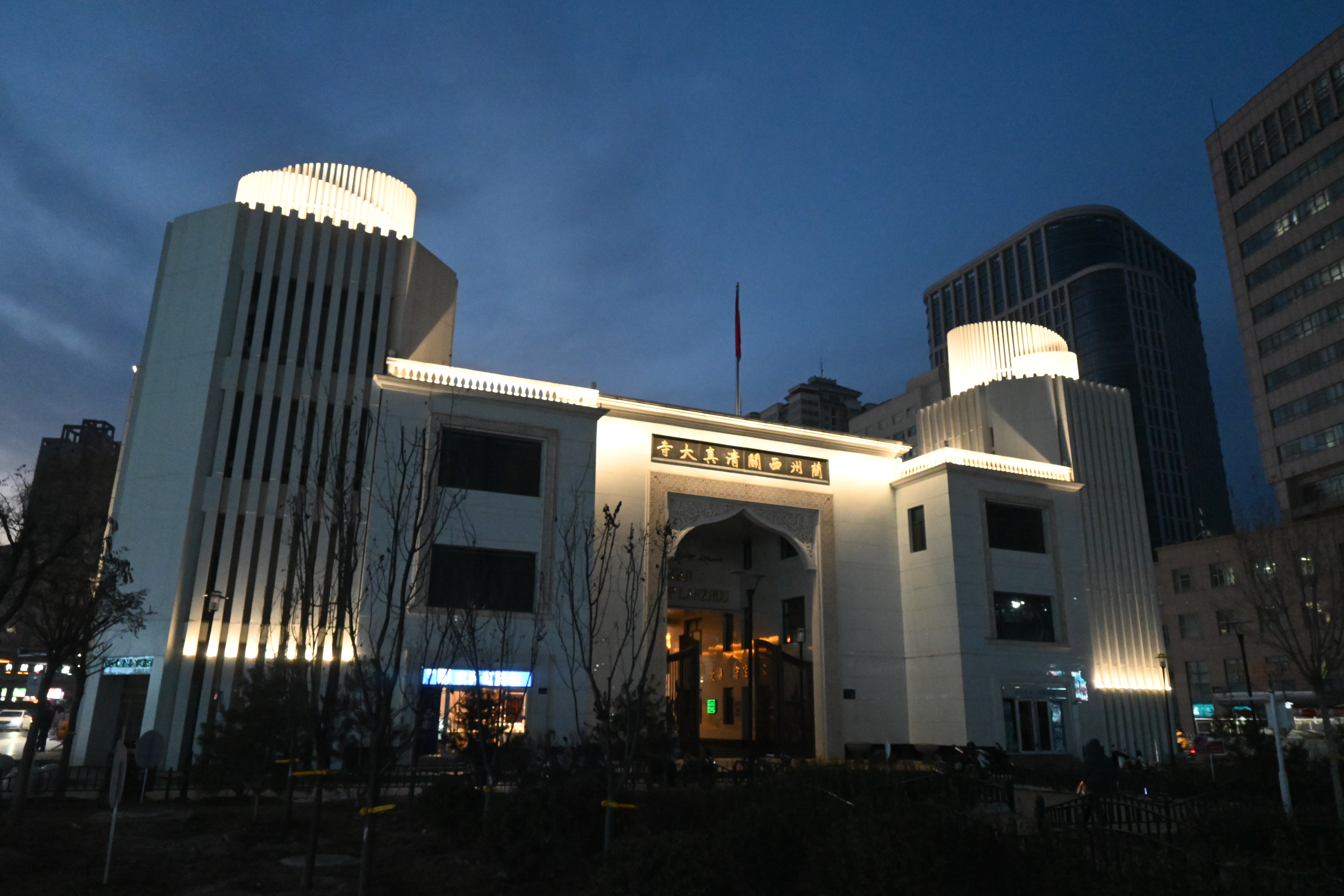

- Location of the mosque in Gansu

Religion
- Affiliation: Sunni Islam
- Ecclesiastical or organizational status: Mosque
- Status: Active

Location
- Location: 1 Cuiyingmen, Chengguan, Lanzhou City, Gansu
- Country: China
- Interactive map of Xiguan Mosque
- Coordinates: 36°03′36″N 103°48′34″E

Architecture
- Type: Mosque
- Style: Arabic Minimalism
- Completed: 1687 (original building); 1990 (restructure); 2023 (restructure)
- Demolished: 1966–1967

Specifications
- Capacity: c. 3,000 worshipers
- Interior area: 141 m^{2} (1,520 sq ft)
- Dome: 1 (added in 1990)
- Dome height (outer): 37 m (121 ft)
- Minaret: 4 (removed in 2023)
- Site area: 467 m^{2} (5,030 sq ft)

The Xiguan Mosque (simplified Chinese: 西关清真寺; traditional Chinese: 西關清真寺; pinyin: Xīguān Qīngzhēnsì), also known as the West Cross Mosque Lanzhou, is a mosque in the Chengguan District of Lanzhou City, in the province of Gansu, China.

== History ==
The mosque was built during the Wanli Emperor of the Ming dynasty. During the Qing dynasty, the mosque underwent two major reconstructions. The mosque was rebuilt in 1990 when a dome was added with four pagoda-topped minarets. In 2023, the Lanzhou government transformed the Xiguan Mosque to a minimalist style, removing the dome and minarets as part of a national effort to sinicize Islam in China.

== Architecture ==
The style of the mosque follows the Arabic Islamic and minimalist styles, while the prayer hall combines the Chinese classical and Arabic architectural styles. The mosque covers an area of 467 square metres (5,030 sq ft) with its prayer hall spanning 141 square metres (1,520 sq ft).

The architecture of the mosque was intended to mimic and echo the style of Al-Aqsa Mosque in Jerusalem.

== Gallery ==
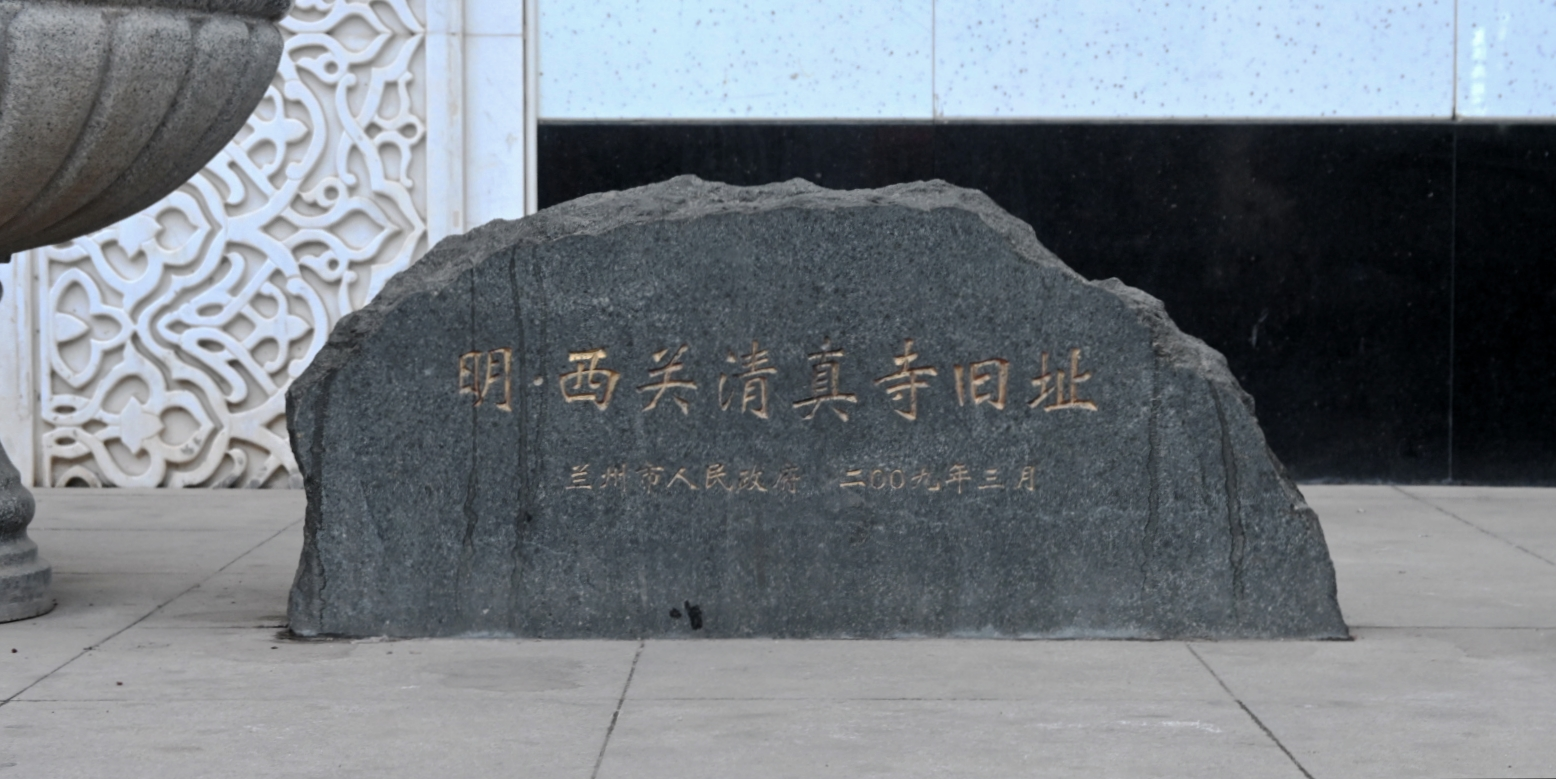
The site of the mosque during the Ming Dynasty

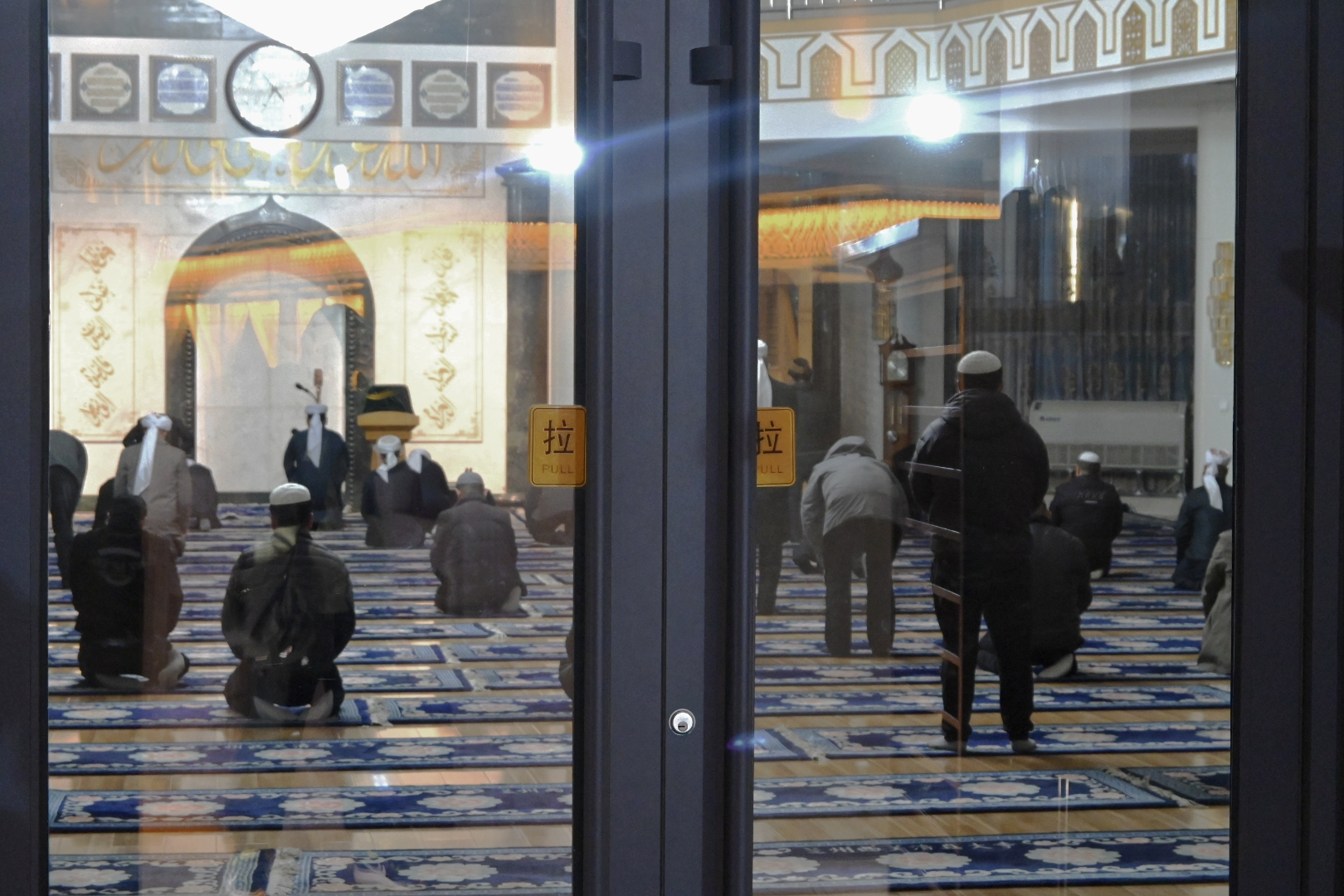
Prayers in the hall

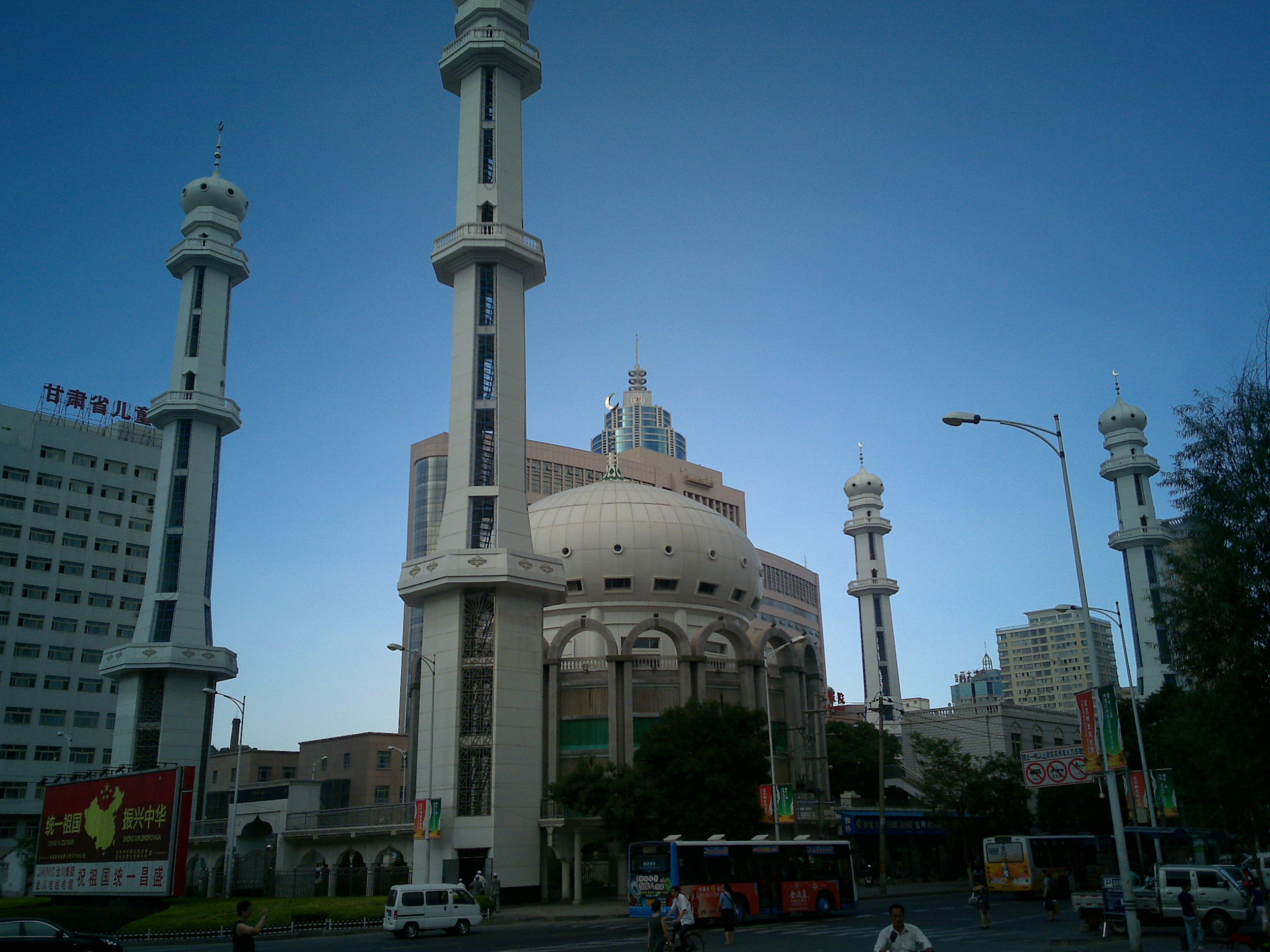
The mosque in 2010 when the four minarets were extant

== See also ==
- Islam in China
- List of mosques in China
