= Gansu Agricultural University =

University in Lanzhou, China

- 甘肃农业大学
- Former names: 西北畜牧兽医学院
- Motto: 敦品励学 笃志允能
- Type: Public university
- Established: October 1946
- Location: Lanzhou, Gansu, China
- Website: www.gsau.edu.cn

Established in 1946, Gansu Agricultural University (GAU) is a non-profit public higher education institution in the city of Lanzhou, Gansu. Officially accredited/recognized by the Department of Education of Gansu Province. Gansu Agricultural University is a large (15,000-19,999 students) coeducational institution, offering courses and programs leading to officially recognized higher education degrees such as bachelor's degrees, master's degrees, doctorate degrees in several areas of study.

It is one of the universities on the first list of China's Excellent Agricultural and Forestall Personnel Training Project. This 70-year-old institution has a selective admission policy based on entrance examinations. GAU provides academic and non-academic facilities and services to students including a library, sport facilities and/or activities, as well as administrative services.

== History ==
August 1945: College of National North-Western Agricultural established by Ministry of Education.

1950: Its name changed to North-Western Veterinary College.

1958: It moved to Huang Yang town from Lanzhou and combined with the College of Gansu Agricultural. Later it changed the name to Gansu Agricultural University.

1981: Its campus moved back to Lanzhou city.

== Academic programs and departments ==
SThere are 15 departments in Lanzhou campus, which including 53 Bachelor programs, eight Master programs, and seven doctorate programs.

Additionally, practaculture science, animal science, and veterinarian have been prized as the National Key Academic Programs.

No.	Department	Program names
1	Agronomy	Agronomy Rural Regional Development Seed Science and Engineering Chinese Medicinal Plants Cultivation and Application
2	Practaculture	Plant Protection Practaculture Science Practaculture Science (management direction)
3	Animal Science	Animal Medicine Animal Science
4	Animal Science and Technology	Animal Science (animal husbandry direction) Aquaculture Science
5	Forest	Forestry Landscape Architecture Soil Conservation and Desertification Control
6	Engineering	Electrical Engineering and Automation Civil Engineering Water Resources and Hydropower Engineering Transportation Agricultural Mechanization and Its Automation Agricultural Electrification Agricultural Water Conservancy Engineering
7	Gardening	Gardening Mechanical Design, Manufacturing and Automation
8	Bioscience and Application	Bioscience (animal direction) Bioscience (plant direction, related products) Bioscience (biomass energy direction)
9	Food Science and Engineering	Food Science and Engineering Food Quality and Safety Wine and enological engineering Bioengineering
10	Environment and Resources	Geography and rural planning Geographic Information Science Environmental Engineering Agricultural resources and environment Land and Resource Management
11	Economy	Economics Finance Marketing Financial Management Agricultural and Forestry Economy Management
12	Science	Applied Chemistry Applied Statistics Material Chemistry
13	Arts	Law Secretary Chinese Language and Literature Management of Human Resources Labor and Social Security
14	Computer Technology/Computing	Electronic Information Engineering Computer Science and Technology
15	Foreign Language	English Language and Literature Business English
