= Lanzhou University of Technology =

University in Lanzhou, China

- 兰州理工大学
- Motto: 奋进求是
- Type: Public university
- Established: 1919
- President: 苪执元
- Faculty: 1,570
- Administrative staff: 2,309
- Undergraduates: 23,721
- Postgraduates: 3,878
- Location: Lanzhou, Gansu Province, China
- Nickname: 理工大 (Ligong Da)
- Website: http://www.lut.edu.cn/

Lanzhou University of Technology (Chinese: 兰州理工大学; pinyin: Lánzhōu Lǐgōng Dàxué) is a scientific and technological university located in Lanzhou, the provincial capital of Gansu Province, China.

== History ==
Lanzhou University of Technology was established as Ganzhou Technical School in 1919. In 1958, the school was renamed to Lanzhou Polytechnic Institute. In the same year, it merged with Gansu Communication College and changed its name to Gansu University of Technology. In 1965, the university broadened its curriculum when three specialties from Northeast Heavy-Machine Building Institute, and one specialty from Beijing Machine-Building Institute became a part of the university. The above specialties were a part of First Machine-Building Industry Ministry of China prior to transfer. Subsequent to the reorganization of the State Council of China in 1998, the university is administered by the provincial government and central government. The university was renamed Lanzhou University of Technology in May 2003 following approval by the Education Ministry of China.

=== Location ===
The school is located in Qilihe District in Lanzhou city, the capital of Gansu Province. It has two campuses with a land mass area of 2430 acres and building area of 2,220,000 m^{2}.

== Administration ==
=== Faculty structure ===
The university comprises twenty-one colleges and departments, sixty-five Undergraduate programs, eighty-six master's degree programs, twenty-six Doctorate Degree programs, one National Key lab, twelve Provincial Engineering Investigation Centers, and fifteen University Enterprise Engineering Investigation Centers.

The university has 15 academic disciplines of Provincial importance that form an academic system with its own distinctive qualities.

=== Staff ===
The university has 2,309 faculty including 1,570 full-time lecturers, 890 professors and associate professors and 130 doctoral tutors. The university has a total of 27,599 full-time students among them 3,878 graduate students.

=== Foreign exchange and international students ===
There are 279 international students at the university from 35 countries. The school has a developed exchange program where it offers 2+2 and 1+2+1 programs in collaboration with universities from overseas.
