= Lanzhou Jiaotong University =

University in Lanzhou, People's Republic of China

- 兰州交通大学
- Former names: Lanzhou Railway University
- Type: Public university
- Established: May 1958; 68 years ago
- President: 李引珍 (Li Yinzhen)
- Administrative staff: 2,350
- Undergraduates: 17,000
- Postgraduates: 1,800
- Location: Lanzhou, Gansu, China; 36.1054°N 103.7243°E
- Colors: Blue
- Website: www.lzjtu.cn

Lanzhou Jiaotong University (Chinese: 兰州交通大学; pinyin: Lánzhōu Jiāotōng Dàxué) is a transport university in Lanzhou, Gansu Province, China.

It was founded in 1958 as the Lanzhou Railway University for railway engineering, a collaboration of Southwest Jiaotong University, Beijing Jiaotong University and the Chinese Ministry of Railways. Until 2000 it was under leadership of the Ministry of Railways. In 2003, it adapted its current name.

== Schools ==
- Civil Engineering
- Automatization and Electric Engineering
- Electronics and Information Engineering
- Mechatronic Engineering
- Environmental and Municipal Engineering
- Economics and Management
- Traffic and Transportation
- Chemical and Biological Engineering
- Foreign Languages
- Mathematics, Physics and Software Engineering
- Architecture and Urban Planning
- Art and Design
- Continuing Education
- International Joint Education

=== Academic Structure ===
Lanzhou Jiaotong University (LZJTU) comprises eight academic disciplines: Engineering, Science, Economics, Management, Literature, Law, Art, and Pedagogy. The university is authorized to grant doctoral degrees in seven first-level disciplines and one interdisciplinary doctoral category. It also operates five postdoctoral research centers.

At the master's level, LZJTU offers programs in 28 first-level disciplines and 16 master's degree categories. The university has 24 disciplines designated as key disciplines at the provincial level.

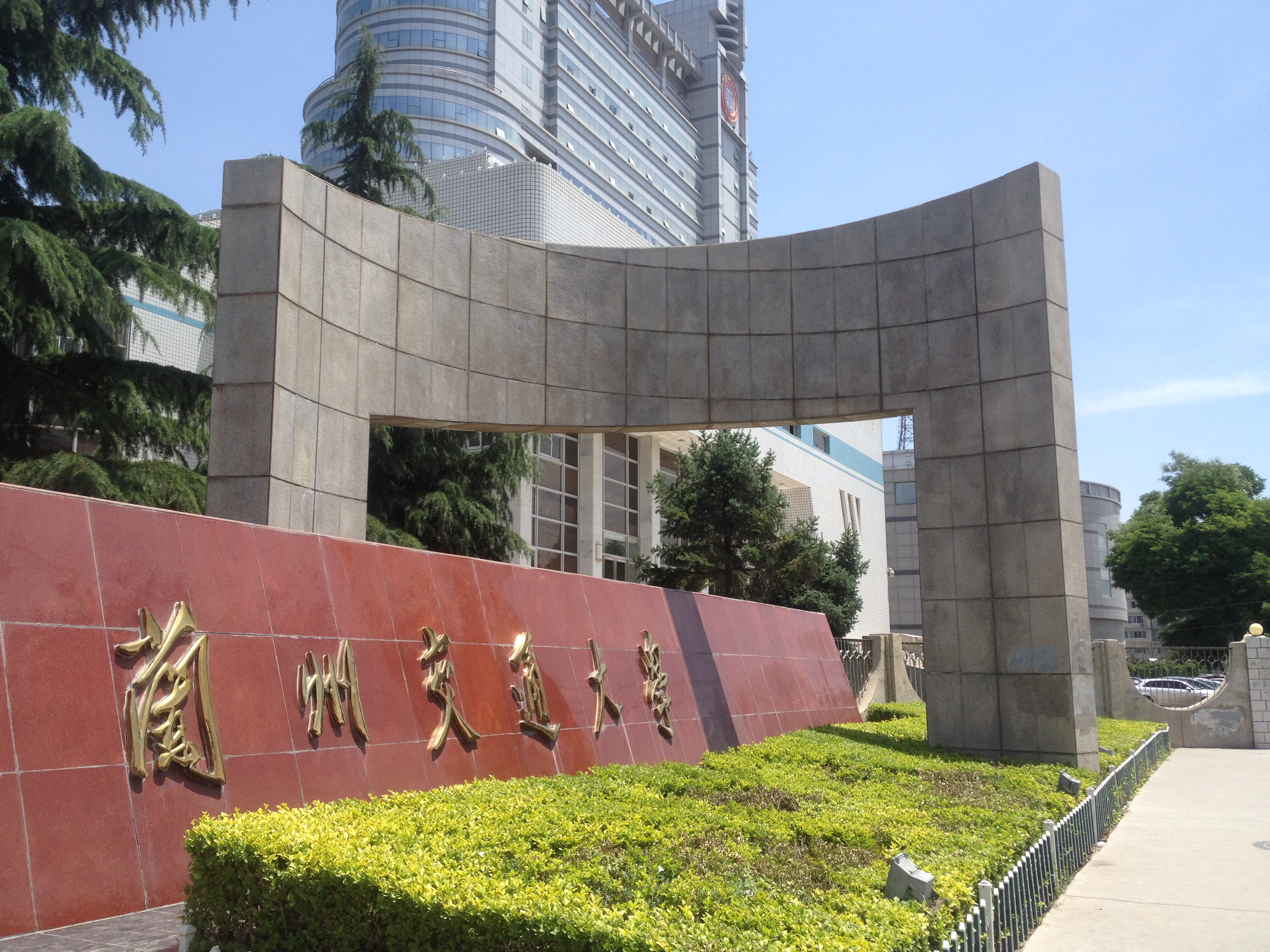
Lanzhou Jiaotong University

LZJTU offers 66 undergraduate programs (65 with current enrollment), covering a broad range of academic and professional fields. A number of programs in Engineering, Chemistry, Materials Science, and Environmental Science have entered the top 1% globally according to Essential Science Indicators (ESI).

== Faculty and Students ==
Lanzhou Jiaotong University has a total staff of 2,279, including 1,838 full-time faculty members. Among them are 322 professors and 703 associate professors, with 916 faculty members holding doctoral degrees.

The university currently enrolls 30,437 full-time students, comprising 22,102 undergraduates, 7,587 master's students (including 915 part-time students), 496 doctoral candidates, 212 international students, and 804 vocational college students.

== International Cooperation ==
Lanzhou Jiaotong University has established academic collaborations with more than 67 universities and institutions across 25 countries and regions, including the United States, the United Kingdom, France, Russia, Canada, Japan, Spain, and Brazil. In 2021, the university, in partnership with the University of Seville, jointly established a Confucius Institute in Spain under the authorization of the Chinese International Education Foundation.
