= Xuanhe =

Xuanhe (Chinese: 宣和; pinyin: Xuānhé; lit. 'proclaiming peace') may refer to:

- Xuanhe (1119–1125), reign period of Emperor Huizong of Song
- Xuanhe, Ningxia, a town in Zhongwei, Ningxia, China
- Xuanhe Township, Liancheng County, Fujian, China
