= Xuanhe, Ningxia =

Xuanhe 宣和镇
- Town
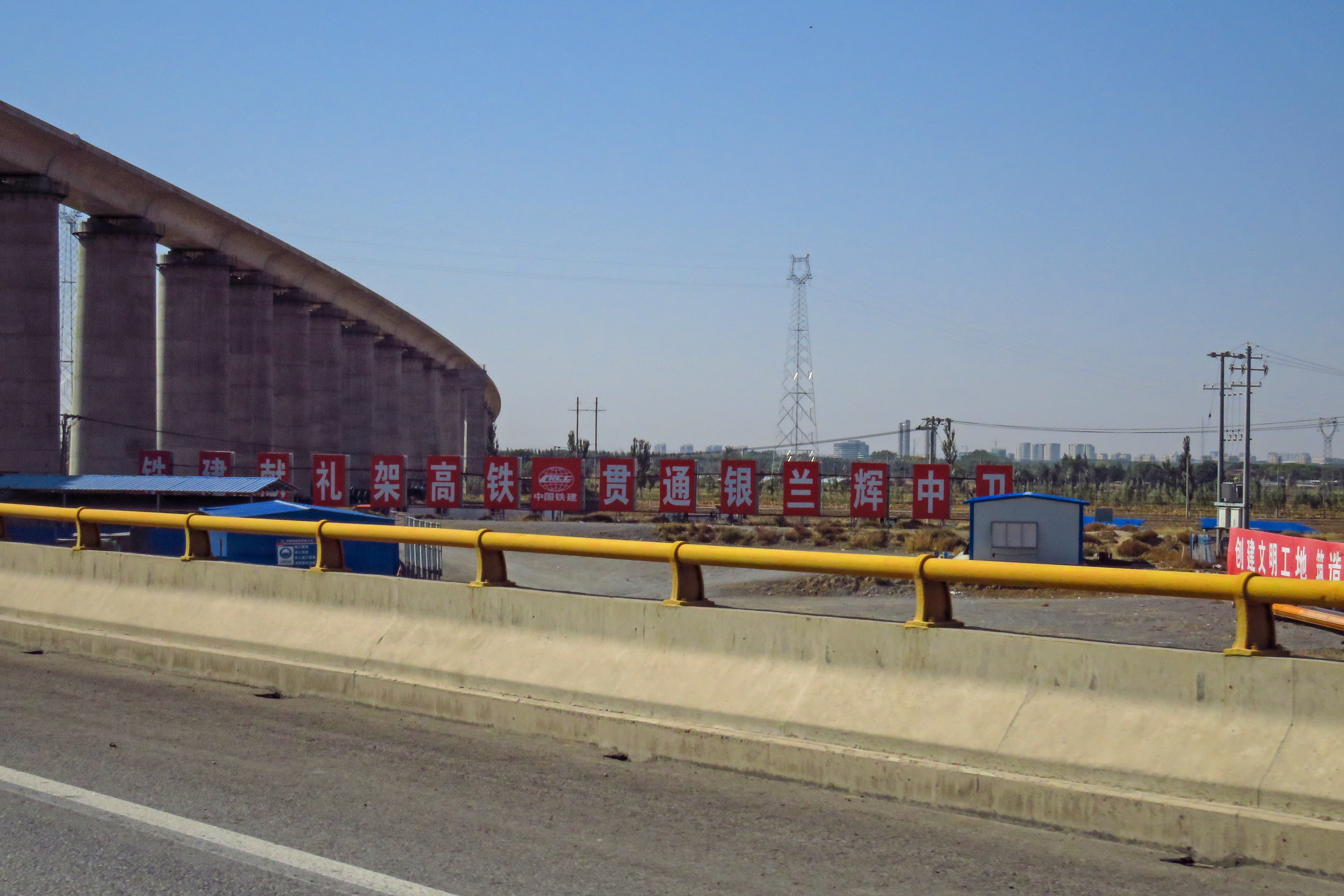
- Construction site of the Yinchuan–Lanzhou high-speed railway at Xuanhe

- Location in Ningxia
- Coordinates: 37°28′16″N 105°25′56″E
- Country: People's Republic of China
- Autonomous region: Ningxia
- Prefecture-level city: Zhongwei
- District: Shapotou District
- Time zone: UTC+8 (China Standard)

Xuanhe (Chinese: 宣和; pinyin: Xuānhé) is a town under the administration of Shapotou District, Zhongwei, Ningxia, China. As of 2020, it administers the following 24 villages:

- Xuanhe Village
- Futang Village (福堂村)
- Fuxing Village (福兴村)
- Lingyang Village (羚羊村)
- Dongyue Village (东月村)
- Heying Village (何营村)
- Jiuying Village (旧营村)
- Zhaotan Village (赵滩村)
- Sanying Village (三营村)
- Zhanghong Village (张洪村)
- Hong'ai Village (宏爱村)
- Matan Village (马滩村)
- Wangyuan Village (汪园村)
- Yonghe Village (永和村)
- Caoshan Village (曹山村)
- Jingnong Village (敬农村)
- Xigou Village (喜沟村)
- Danyang Village (丹阳村)
- Caotai Village (草台村)
- Huahe Village (华和村)
- Haihe Village (海和村)
- Linghe Village (羚和村)
- Xinghai Village (兴海村)
- Linchang Village (林昌村)
