= Caizi =

Caizi may refer to:

- Caizi Jiaren, a genre of pre-modern Chinese fiction
- Caizi, Gansu, a town in Longxi County, Gansu, China
- Caizi Township, Puge County, Sichuan, China
