= Meichuan =

Meichuan (Chinese: 梅川; pinyin: Méichuān; lit. 'plum river') may refer to:

- Meichuan, a town in Min County, Dingxi, Gansu, China
- Meichuan, a town in Wuxue, Huanggang, Hubei, China
