= Huajialing Town =

- Town
- 华家岭镇
- Interactive map of Huajialing Town
- Coordinates: 35°22′46″N 105°00′38″W
- Country: China
- Province: Gansu
- Prefecture-level city: Dingxi
- County: Tongwei
- Incorporated: 2017

Population
  - Total: 13,850
- Time zone: UTC8 (PST)
- Climate: Dwc

Huajialing Town (Chinese: 华家岭镇) is a township-level administrative unit under the jurisdiction of Tongwei County, Dingxi City, Gansu Province, People's Republic of China. It is located roughly equidistant from the seats of Tongwei, Huining and Anding (Dingxi city).

In 2017, the Civil Affairs Department of Gansu Province approved the abolition of Huajialing Township and the establishment of Huajialing Town.

The old Xi'an-Lanzhou highway passes through Huajialing, this road was first constructed in the 17th century and formed an important artery, especially during the Second Sino-Japanese War and the Chinese Civil War, when the area saw heavy fighting. During the 1980s the section through Huajialing lost its importance as a new route was built.

The town is at the center of a reforestation programme of Gansu's Loess Plateau region, which commenced in 1971.

== Administrative divisions ==
Huajialing Town governs the following areas:

Villages under the jurisdiction of the town
District type	Chinese original	Hanyu pinyin
Villages	新站村	Xinzhan
Villages	石勿村	Shiwu
Villages	老站村	Laozhan
Villages	西家去村	Xijiaqu
Villages	活马滩村	Huomatan
Villages	后湾村	Houwan
Villages	李家岔村	Lijiacha
Villages	班家岔村	Banjiacha
Villages	大牛村	Daniu
Villages	小牛村	Xiaoniu
Villages	朱家堡村	Zhujiabao
Villages	梁家去村	Liangjiaqu
Villages	石卜沟村	Shibugou
Villages	高尧村	Gaoyao
Villages	善马沟村	Shanmagou
Villages	黄河村	Huanghe
Villages	牛家山村	Niujiashan
Villages	世歌窑村	Shigeyao

== Climate ==
Huajialing has a subarctic climate (Köppen climate classification Dwc). The average annual temperature in Huajialing is 3.9 °C (39.0 °F). The average annual rainfall is 451.3 mm (17.77 in) with July as the wettest month. The temperatures are highest on average in July, at around 15.1 °C (59.2 °F), and lowest in January, at around −8.1 °C (17.4 °F).

Climate data for Huajialing, elevation 2,451 m (8,041 ft), (1991–2020 normals, extremes 1981–2010)
Month	Jan	Feb	Mar	Apr	May	Jun	Jul	Aug	Sep	Oct	Nov	Dec	Year
Record high °C (°F)	9.4 (48.9)	14.9 (58.8)	20.0 (68.0)	24.1 (75.4)	24.9 (76.8)	26.9 (80.4)	28.4 (83.1)	27.7 (81.9)	25.0 (77.0)	18.5 (65.3)	14.5 (58.1)	10.0 (50.0)	28.4 (83.1)
Mean daily maximum °C (°F)	−3.5 (25.7)	−0.9 (30.4)	4.5 (40.1)	11.0 (51.8)	15.0 (59.0)	18.3 (64.9)	20.1 (68.2)	19.0 (66.2)	14.1 (57.4)	8.6 (47.5)	3.5 (38.3)	−1.6 (29.1)	9.0 (48.2)
Daily mean °C (°F)	−8.1 (17.4)	−5.5 (22.1)	−0.6 (30.9)	5.4 (41.7)	9.6 (49.3)	13.4 (56.1)	15.4 (59.7)	14.4 (57.9)	10.0 (50.0)	4.5 (40.1)	−1.0 (30.2)	−6.2 (20.8)	4.3 (39.7)
Mean daily minimum °C (°F)	−11.1 (12.0)	−8.4 (16.9)	−3.8 (25.2)	1.4 (34.5)	5.6 (42.1)	9.8 (49.6)	12.0 (53.6)	11.3 (52.3)	7.3 (45.1)	1.8 (35.2)	−3.9 (25.0)	−9.3 (15.3)	1.1 (33.9)
Record low °C (°F)	−24.0 (−11.2)	−21.1 (−6.0)	−19.5 (−3.1)	−12.8 (9.0)	−6.1 (21.0)	−0.8 (30.6)	5.8 (42.4)	3.2 (37.8)	−1.7 (28.9)	−14.9 (5.2)	−18.6 (−1.5)	−25.5 (−13.9)	−25.5 (−13.9)
Average precipitation mm (inches)	5.4 (0.21)	7.2 (0.28)	14.3 (0.56)	29.7 (1.17)	56.1 (2.21)	68.4 (2.69)	95.6 (3.76)	87.8 (3.46)	60.1 (2.37)	35.6 (1.40)	9.0 (0.35)	2.5 (0.10)	471.7 (18.56)
Average precipitation days (≥ 0.1 mm)	6.6	6.6	8.3	8.6	10.8	12.5	13.7	12.2	12.9	10.4	5.7	3.8	112.1
Average snowy days	9.2	9.2	9.1	5.2	1.6	0.1	0	0	0.2	4.7	6.4	5.9	51.6
Average relative humidity (%)	65	69	65	61	65	70	78	81	83	79	69	61	71
Mean monthly sunshine hours	202.7	183.8	212.7	228.8	236.7	212.8	213.6	202.1	151.0	163.2	191.3	211.6	2,410.3
Percentage possible sunshine	65	59	57	58	54	49	49	49	41	47	63	70	55
Source: China Meteorological Administration
