= Gansu earthquake =

Gansu earthquake may refer to:

- 1654 Tianshui earthquake
- 1718 Tongwei–Gansu earthquake
- 1879 Gansu earthquake
- 1920 Haiyuan earthquake
- 2013 Dingxi earthquakes

== See also ==
- List of earthquakes in China
