= Balipu =

Balipu 八里铺镇
- Town
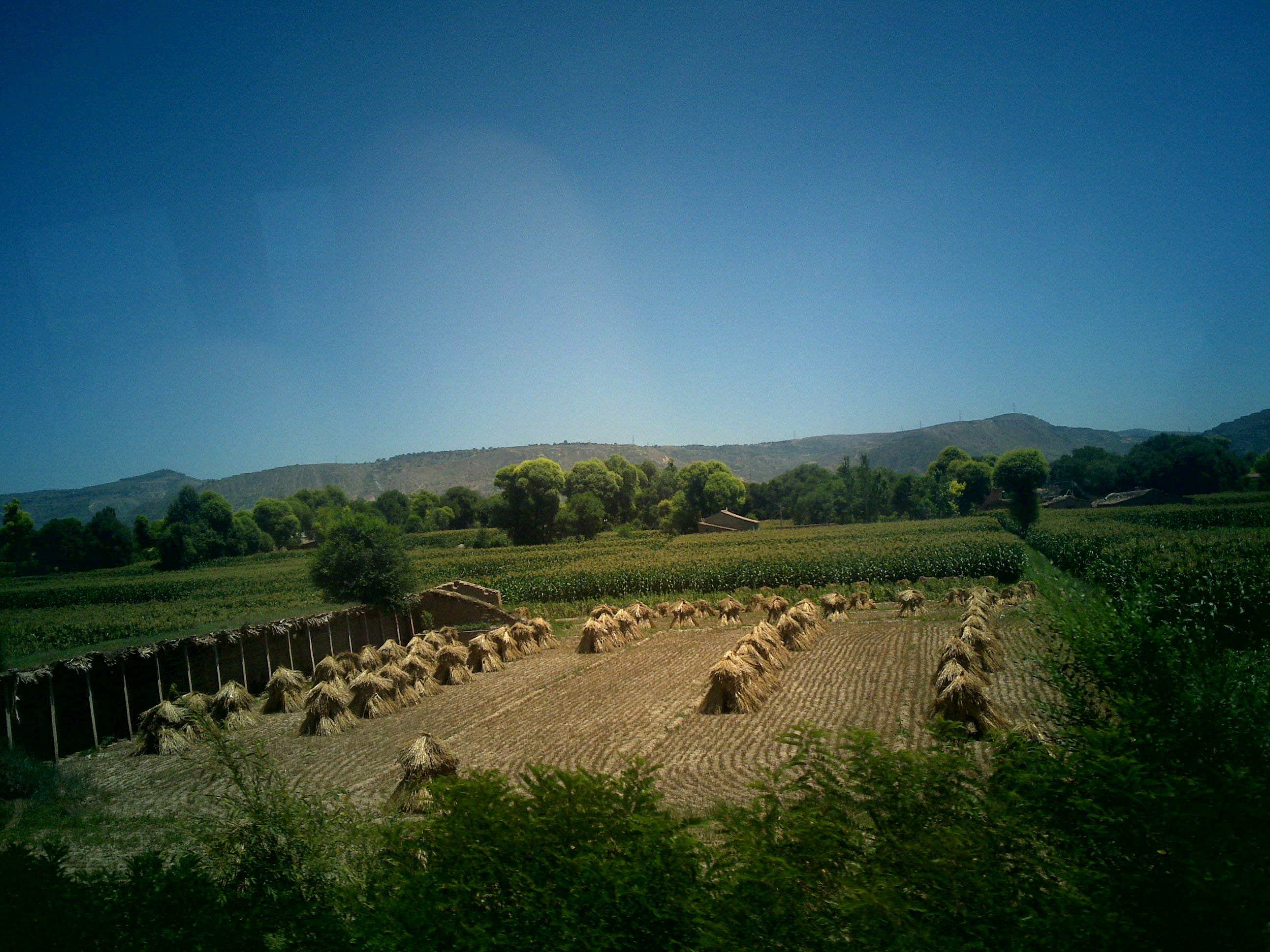

- Location within Gansu Location within China
- Coordinates: 35.42544°N 103.87292°E
- Country: China
- Province: Gansu
- City: Dingxi
- County: Lintao

Population
  - Total: 35,000

Balipu is a town of Lintao County, Dingxi, Gansu, China. Its name is based on the location being eight (Chinese: 八; pinyin: Bā) li (distance unit) from the county seat of Lintao, Taoyang.
