= Gongchang =

Gongchang may refer to the following locations in China:

- Gongchang, Gansu (巩昌镇), town in Longxi County
- Gongchang, Hubei (龚场镇), town in Jianli County, Jingzhou, Hubei
