= Meichuan, Min County =

Meichuan 梅川镇
- Town
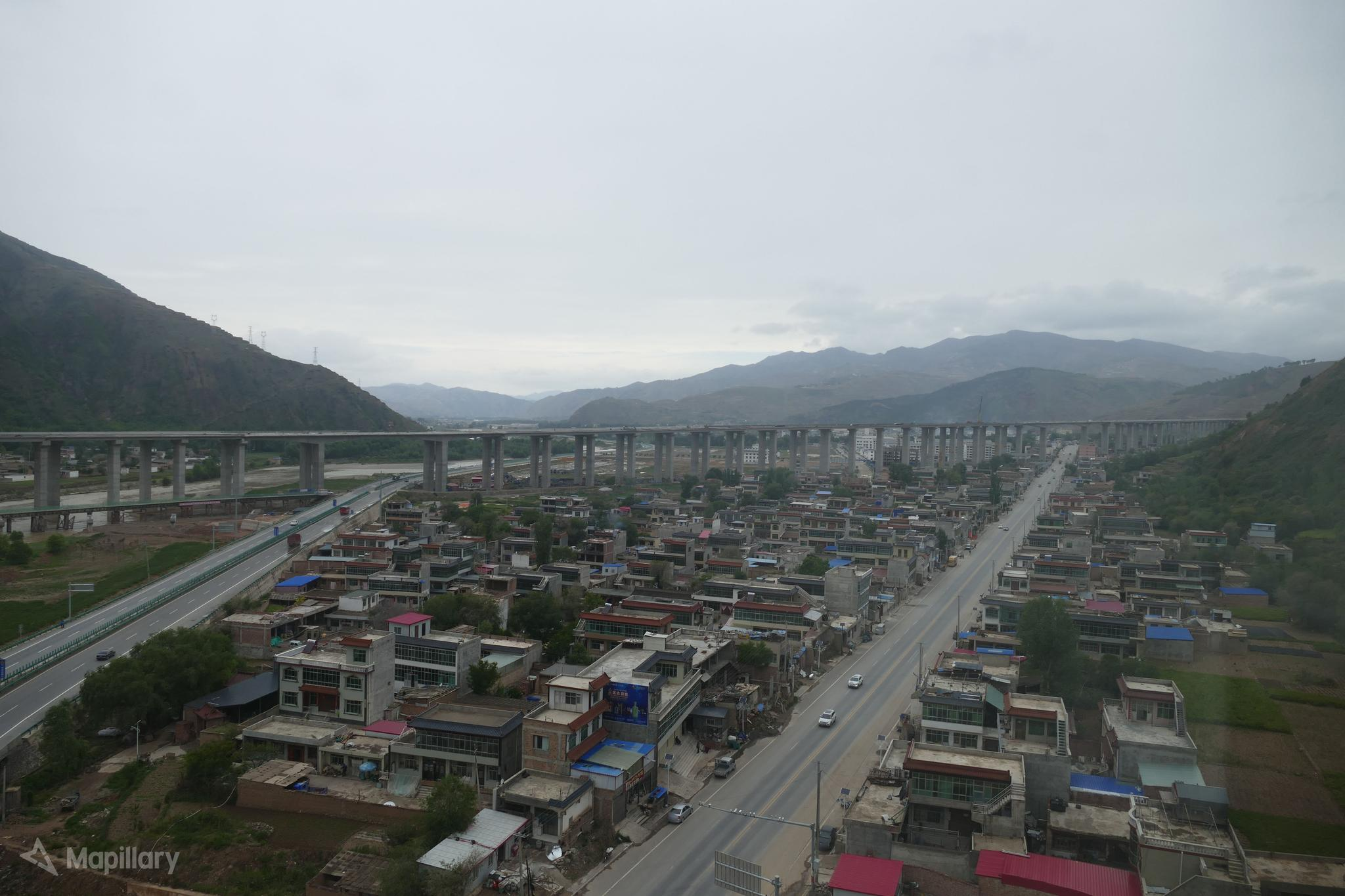

- Location within Gansu
- Coordinates: 34.5336°N 104.0850°E
- Country: China
- Province: Gansu
- Prefecture-level city: Dingxi
- County: Min

Meichuan is a town in Min County, Gansu, China. It was heavily hit by the 2013 Dingxi earthquakes. The town has historically been an important production location and marketplace for traditional Chinese medicines such as angelica, dangshen, and astragalus.
