= Buzi (fortification) =

- Loess Plateau
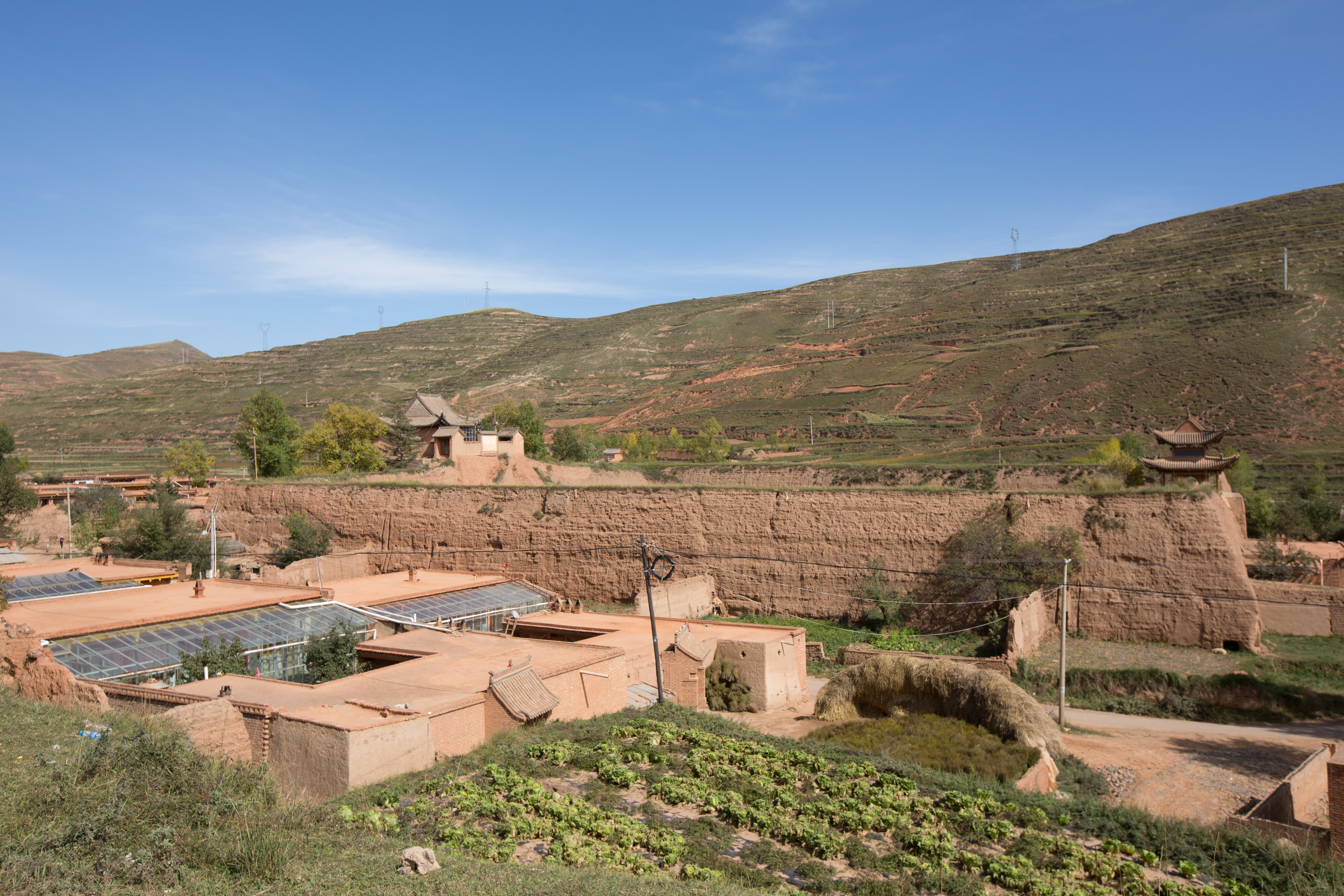
- Hongbuzi (Red Buzi) in Liushun Town, Lintan County

Site information
- Type: Defensive line
- Condition: varies

Site history
- Built: Qin dynasty, Dungan Revolt
- In use: Qin dynasty, Song dynasty, Qing dynasty, Dungan Revolt Sino-Japanese War
- Materials: Rammed earth, loess earth

Buzi
- Simplified Chinese: 堡子
- Traditional Chinese: 堡子
- Literal meaning: "Dwarf fort"
Transcriptions
Standard Mandarin
- Hanyu Pinyin: Bǔzi

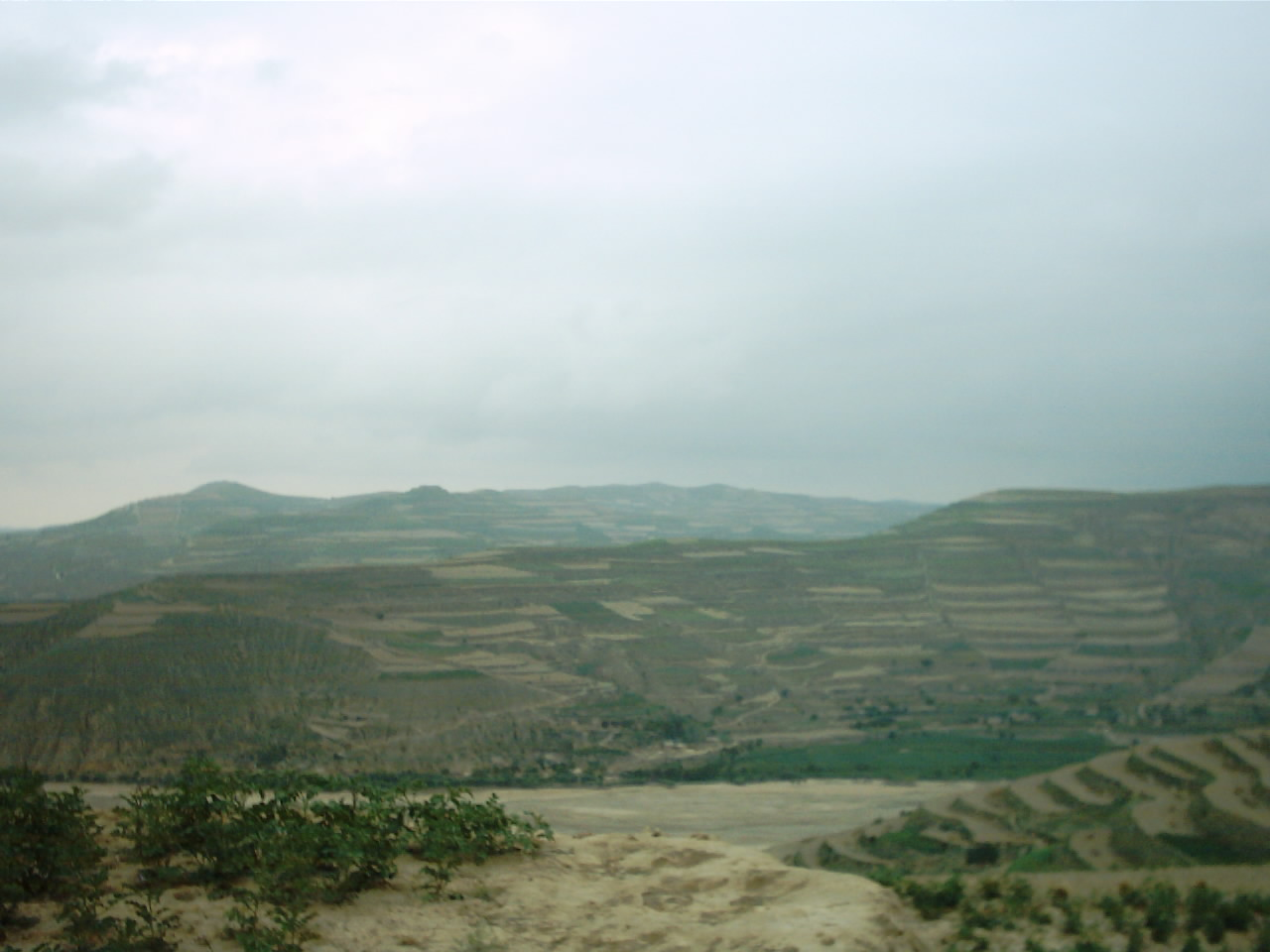
Loess Plateau landscape near Tongwei County seat

Buzi are small forts built along the northern frontier of China. They are prevalent in the Loess Plateau of Shaanxi, Gansu and Ningxia provinces, usually square or oval (as hill forts) and built out of rammed earth walls.

== Geography ==
The forts are built on hilltops, at strategic locations or within villages. They were mainly financed by local notables, and constructed by villagers of the area.

A large number of forts are found in Tianshui (over 500) and Dingxi prefectures, totalling over 1400 forts. One of the densest concentration of forts is Tongwei County, which has the nickname "thousand forts county" (千堡之县). Qin'an County is home over 200 forts including three larger castles.

In Wushan County over 200 of these forts are estimated to exist, of which 61 are relatively well preserved.

Although each fort may not be impressive on its own, the combined defense line of forts has been compared to the Great Wall of China.

== Usage ==
Some of the forts date back to the Qin dynasty, though many are around 150 years old, dating to the late Qing dynasty. During the Dungan Revolt, villagers sought refuge from the raiding and fighting in these forts, strengthened and expanded existing forts and even constructed new forts with the same methods. The forts have been used for defensive purposes as late as the Sino-Japanese war. Nowadays, most of the forts lie abandoned, partly due to the difficulty of reaching the hilltops. The courtyards of some forts have filled by farmhouses or Taoist temples.

The defenders inside the forts varied, with some larger forts being permanently manned by trained military, smaller ones were just refuge places for nearby villagers.
