= Nanping (disambiguation) =

Nanping (南平) is a prefecture-level city in Fujian, China.

Nanping may also refer to:

== Modern locations ==
=== Towns ===
- Nanping, Lintao (南屏), a town in Lintao County, Gansu, China
- Nanping, Guangdong (南屏), a town in Xiangzhou District, Zhuhai, Guangdong, China
- Nanping, Guangnan County (南屏), a town in Guangnan County, Yunnan, China
- Nanping, Pu'er City (南屏), a town in Simao District, Pu'er City, Yunnan, China
- Nanping, Nan'an District (南坪), a town in Nan'an District, Chongqing, China
- Nanping, Sichuan (南坪), a town created in 2013 in Jiuzhaigou County, Sichuan, China
- Nanping, Anhui (南坪), a town in Suixi County, Anhui, China
- Nanping, Jilin (南坪), a town in Helong, Jilin, China
- Nanping, Nanchuan District (南平), a town in Nanchuan District, Chongqing, China
- Nanping, Gong'an County (南平), a town in Gong'an County, Hubei, China

=== Townships ===
- Nanping Township, Shaanxi (南屏乡), a township in Ningqiang County, Shaanxi, China
- Nanping Township, Zhejiang (南屏乡), a township in Tiantai County, Zhejiang, China
- Nanping Township, Guangxi (南屏乡), a township in Shangsi County, Guangxi, China
- Nanping Township, Hubei (南坪乡), a township in Lichuan, Hubei, China
- Nanping Township, Gansu (南坪乡), a township in Zhuanglang County, Gansu, China
- Nanping Township, Sichuan (南坪乡), a township in Xuanhan County, Sichuan, China

=== Subdistricts ===
- Nanping, Changde (南坪街道), Wuling District, Changde City, Hunan Province

=== Railway stations ===
- Nanping Station (南坪站), a Chongqing Rail Transit station in Nanping, Nan'an District, Chongqing, China

== Former locations ==
- Jingnan, a 10th-century kingdom during the Five Dynasties and Ten Kingdoms period, also known as Nanping
- Yanping District in Nanping City, formerly known as Nanping District
- Jiuzhaigou County in Sichuan, China, formerly known as Nanping County
