= List of fu prefectures of China =

Fu (Chinese: 府; pinyin: fǔ), sometimes translated as prefecture or superior prefecture, was a type of administrative division in historical China from Tang dynasty to Qing dynasty. Fu was a level between provinces or equivalent divisions and counties. The term was initially applied to larger or more important prefectures, while the name zhou was applied to common prefectures. By Ming and Qing dynasties, however, most prefectures under provinces had become known as fu. After the establishment of the Republic of China in 1912, the fu-level administrative divisions were streamlined.

== Tang dynasty ==
- (1st) Province-level division: "Circuit" (道, dào)

Total: 9 cities

City	Chinese	Province	Location of prefectural seat
Jingzhao	京兆府	Jingji-dao	Xi'an
Xingde	興德府 (兴德府)	Jingji-dao	Hua County
Fengxiang	鳳翔府 (凤翔府)	Jingji-dao	Fengxiang County
Henan	河南府	Duji-dao	Luoyang
Hezhong	河中府	Hedong-dao	Yongji
Taiyuan	太原府	Hedong-dao	Taiyuan
Jiangning	江陵府	Shannandong-dao	Jiangling County
Xingyuan	興元府 (兴元府)	Shannanxi-dao	Nanzheng County
Chengdu	成都府	Jiannan-dao	Chengdu

== Song dynasty ==
- (1st) Province-level division: "Circuit" (路, lù)

Total: 45 cities

=== Northern Song ===
City	Chinese	Province	Location of prefectural seat
Kaifeng	開封府 (开封府)	Jingji-lu	Kaifeng
Jinan	濟南府 (济南府)	Jingdongdong-lu	Jinan
Yingtian	應天府 (应天府)	Jingdongxi-lu	Shangqiu
Henan	河南府	Jingxibei-lu	Luoyang
Yingchang	潁昌府 (颍昌府)	Jingxibei-lu	Xuchang
Daming	大名府	Hebeidong-lu	Daming County
Zhending	真定府	Hebeixi-lu	Zhengding County
Taiyuan	太原府	Hedong-lu	Taiyuan
Jingzhao	京兆府	Yongxingjun-lu	Xi'an
Hezhong	河中府	Yongxingjun-lu	Yongji
Fengxiang	鳳翔府 (凤翔府)	Qinfeng-lu	Fengxiang County
Jiangning	江寧府 (江宁府)	Jiangnandong-lu	Jurong
Jiangling	江陵府	Jinhubei-lu	Jiangling County
Chengdu	成都府	Chengdufu-lu	Chengdu
Xingyuan	興元府 (兴元府)	Lizhou-lu	Nanzheng County

=== Southern Song ===
City	Chinese	Province	Location of prefectural seat
Lin'an	臨安府 (临安府)	Liangzhexi-lu	Lin'an
Pingjiang	平江府	Liangzhexi-lu	Suzhou, Jiading
Zhenjiang	鎮江府	Liangzhexi-lu	Zhenjiang
Jiaxing	嘉興府 (嘉兴府)	Liangzhexi-lu	Jiaxing
Jiande	建德府	Liangzhexi-lu	Jiande
Shaoxing	紹興府 (绍兴府)	Liangzhedong-lu	Shaoxing
Qingyuan	慶元府 (庆元府)	Liangzhedong-lu	Yinzhou
Rui'an	瑞安府	Liangzhedong-lu	Yongjia County
Ninguo	寧国府 (宁国府)	Jiangnandong-lu	Xuanzhou
Jiankang	建康府	Jiangnandong-lu	Nanjing
Longxing	隆興府 (隆兴府)	Jiangnanxi-lu	Xinjian
Shouchun	壽春府 (寿春府)	Huainanxi-lu	Fengtai County
Anqing	安慶府 (安庆府)	Huainanxi-lu	Anqing
Baoqing	宝慶府 (宝庆府)	Jinghunan-lu	Shaoyang
Jiangling	江陵府	Jinghubei-lu	Zhijiang & Qianjiang
De'an	德安府	Jinghubei-lu	Anlu
Changde	常德府	Jinghubei-lu	Changde
Jiangning	建寧府 (建宁府)	Fujian-lu	Jian'ou
Chengdu	成都府	Chengdufu-lu	Chengdu
Chongqing	崇慶府 (崇庆府)	Chengdufu-lu	Chongzhou
Jiading	嘉定府	Chengdufu-lu	Leshan
Tongchuan	潼川府	Tongchuanfu-lu	Dazhou
Suining	遂寧府 (遂宁府)	Tongchuanfu-lu	Suining
Shunqing	順慶府 (顺庆府)	Tongchuanfu-lu	Nanchong
Shaoqing	紹慶府 (绍庆府)	Kuizhou-lu	Pengshui County
Xianchun	咸淳府	Kuizhou-lu	Zhong County
Chongqing	重慶府 (重庆府)	Kuizhou-lu	Chongqing
Xingyuan	興元府 (兴元府)	Lizhou-lu	Nanzheng County
Longqing	隆慶府 (隆庆府)	Lizhou-lu	Jiange County
Tongqing	同慶府 (同庆府)	Lizhou-lu	Cheng County
Yingde	英德府	Guangnandong-lu	Yingde
Zhaoqing	肇慶府 (肇庆府)	Guangnandong-lu	Zhaoqing
Deqing	德慶府 (德庆府)	Guangnandong-lu	Deqing County
Jingjiang	静江府 (静江府)	Guangnanxi-lu	Guilin
Qingyuan	慶遠府 (庆远府)	Guangnanxi-lu	Qingyuan

== Liao dynasty ==
- (1st) Province-level division: "Circuit" (道, dào)

Total: 13 cities

City	Chinese	Province	Location of prefectural seat
Linhuang	臨潢府 (临潢府)	Shangjing-dao	Bairin Left Banner
Liaoyang	遼陽府 (辽阳府)	Dongjing-dao	Liaoyang
Huanglong	黃龍府 (黄龙府)	Dongjing-dao	Siping
Lübin	率賓府 (率宾府)	Dongjing-dao	Ussuriysk in Russia
Dingli	定理府	Dongjing-dao	Partizansk in Russia
Tieli	鐵利府 (铁利府)	Dongjing-dao	Yilan County
Anding	安定府	Dongjing-dao	Dalnegorsk in Russia
Changling	長嶺府 (长岭府)	Dongjing-dao	Jilin
Zhenhai	鎮海府 (镇海府)	Dongjing-dao	Zhuanghe
Dading	大定府	Zhongjing-dao	Ningcheng County
Xingzhong	興中府 (兴中府)	Zhongjing-dao	Chaoyang County
Xijin	析津府	Nanjing-dao	Fangshan
Datong	大同府	Xijing-dao	Datong

== Jin dynasty ==
- (1st) Province-level division: "Circuit" (路, lù)

Total: 30 cities

City	Chinese	Province	Location of prefectural seat
Huining	會寧府 (会宁府)	Shangjing-lu	Acheng
Daxing	大興府 (大兴府)	Zhongdu-lu	Daxing
Liaoyang	遼陽府 (辽阳府)	Dongjing-lu	Liaoyang
Dading	大定府	Beijing-lu	Ningcheng County
Guangning	廣寧府 (广宁府)	Beijing-lu	Beizhen
Xingzhong	興中府 (兴中府)	Beijing-lu	Chaoyang County
Linhuang	臨潢府 (临潢府)	Beijing-lu	Bairin Left Banner
Datong	大同府	Xijing-lu	Datong
Dexing	德興府 (德兴府)	Xijing-lu	Zhuolu County
Kaifeng	開封府 (开封府)	Nanjing-lu	Kaifeng
Guide	歸德府 (归德府)	Nanjing-lu	Shangqiu
Henan	河南府	Nanjing-lu	Luoyang
Hejian	河間府 (河间府)	Hebeidong-lu	Hejian
Zhending	真定府	Hebeixi-lu	Zhengding County
Zhangde	彰德府	Hebeixi-lu	Anyang
Zhongshan	中山府	Hebeixi-lu	Dingzhou
Yidu	益都府	Shandongdong-lu	Qingzhou
Jinan	濟南府 (济南府)	Shandongdong-lu	Jinan
Dongping	東平府 (东平府)	Shandongxi-lu	Dongping County
Daming	大名府	Damingfu-lu	Daming County
Taiyuan	太原府	Hedongbei-lu	Taiyuan
Pingyang	平陽府 (平阳府)	Hedongnan-lu	Yuncheng
Hezhong	河中府	Hedongnan-lu	Yongji
Jingzhao	京兆府	Jingzhaofu-lu	Xi'an
Xianping	咸平府	Xianping-lu	Kaiyuan
Fengxiang	鳳翔府 (凤翔府)	Fengxiang-lu	Fengxiang County
Pingliang	平涼府	Fengxiang-lu	Pingliang
Yan'an	延安府	Fuyan-lu	Yan'an
Qingyang	慶陽府 (庆阳府)	Qingyang-lu	Qingcheng County
Lintao	臨洮府 (临洮府)	Lintao-lu	Lintao County

== Western Xia ==
- (1st) Province-level division: "Prefecture" (州; zhōu)

Total: 4 cities

City	Chinese	Province	Location of prefectural seat
Xingqing	興慶府 (兴庆府)	Xingzhou	Yinchuan
Xiliang	西凉府	Liangzhou	Wuwei
Xuanhua	宣化府	Ganzhou	Zhangye
Xiping	西平府	Lingzhou	Lingwu

== Yuan dynasty ==
- (1st) Province-level division: "Province" (行中書省, 行中书省; xíngzhōngshūshěng)

Total: 30 cities

City	Chinese	Province	Location of prefectural seat
Shajing	砂井府	Secretariat-controlled	
Banyang	般陽府 (般阳府)	Secretariat-controlled	
Cheli	徹里府 (彻里府)	Yunnan	
Rende	仁德府	Yunnan	
Baixing	柏興府 (柏兴府)	Yunnan	
Yongchang	永昌府	Yunnan	
Tengchong	騰沖府 (腾冲府)	Yunnan	
Shunning	順寧府 (顺宁府)	Yunnan	
Nandian	南甸府	Yunnan	
Henan	河南府	Henanjiangbei	
Nanyang	南陽府 (南阳府)	Henanjiangbei	
Runing	汝寧府 (汝宁府)	Henanjiangbei	
Guide	歸德府 (归德府)	Henanjiangbei	
Gaoyao	高郵府 (高邮府)	Henanjiangbei	
Anlu	安陸府 (安陆府)	Henanjiangbei	
De'an	德安府	Henanjiangbei	
Ningxia	寧夏府 (宁夏府)	Gansu	
Hanyang	漢陽府 (汉阳府)	Huguang	
Pingle	平樂府 (平乐府)	Huguang	
Songjiang	松江府	Jiangzhe	
Jiading	嘉定府	Sichuan	
Tongchuan	潼川府	Sichuan	
Shaoqing	紹慶府 (绍庆府)	Sichuan	
Huaide	懷德府 (怀德府)	Sichuan	
Jingzhao→Xi'an	京兆府→安西府	Sichuan	
Fengxiang	鳳翔府 (凤翔府)	Sichuan	
Gongchang	鞏昌府 (巩昌府)	Sichuan	Longxi County
Pingliang	平凉府	Sichuan	
Lintao	臨洮府 (临洮府)	Sichuan	
Qingyang	慶陽府 (庆阳府)	Sichuan	

== Ming dynasty ==
- (1st) Province-level division: "Province" (省; shěng)

Total: 183 cities

City	Chinese	Province	Location of prefectural seat
Yingtian	應天府 (应天府)	Zhili→Nanzhili	
Suzhou	蘇州府 (苏州府)	Zhili→Nanzhili	
Songjiang	松江府	Zhili→Nanzhili	
Changzhou	常州府	Zhili→Nanzhili	
Zhenjiang	鎮江府 (镇江府)	Zhili→Nanzhili	
Huai'an	淮安府	Zhili→Nanzhili	
Yangzhou	揚州府 (扬州府)	Zhili→Nanzhili	
Fengyang	鳳陽府 (凤阳府)	Zhili→Nanzhili	
Luzhou	廬州府 (庐州府)	Zhili→Nanzhili	
Anqing	安慶府	Zhili→Nanzhili	
Huizhou	徽州府	Zhili→Nanzhili	
Taiping	太平府	Zhili→Nanzhili	
Chizhou	池州府	Zhili→Nanzhili	
Ningguo	寧國府 (寧国府)	Zhili→Nanzhili	
Beiping→Shuntian	北平府→順天府 (顺天府)	Beiping→Beizhili	
Baoding	保定府	Beiping→Beizhili	
Hejiang	河間府 (河间府)	Beiping→Beizhili	
Zhending	真定府	Beiping→Beizhili	
Shunde	順德府 (顺德府)	Beiping→Beizhili	
Guangping	廣平府 (广平府)	Beiping→Beizhili	
Daming	大名府	Beiping→Beizhili	
Pingluan→Yongping	平滦府 (平灤府)→永平府	Beiping→Beizhili	
Xi'an	西安府	Shaanxi	
Yan'an	延安府	Shaanxi	
Hanzhong	漢中府 (汉中府)	Shaanxi	
Pingliang	平涼府	Shaanxi	
Fengxiang	鳳翔府 (凤翔府)	Shaanxi	
Lintao	臨洮府 (临洮府)	Shaanxi	
Taiyuan	太原府	Shanxi	
Datong	大同府	Shanxi	
Fengzhou	汾州府	Shanxi	
Pingyang	平陽府 (平阳府)	Shanxi	
Lu'an	潞安府	Shanxi	
Jinan	濟南府 (济南府)	Shandong	
Yanzhou	兗州府 (兖州府)	Shandong	
Qingzhou	青州府	Shandong	
Dengzhou	登州府	Shandong	
Dongchang	東昌府 (东昌府)	Shandong	
Laizhou	萊州府 (莱州府)	Shandong	
Kaifeng	開封府 (开封府)	Henan	
Henan	河南府	Henan	
Weihui	衛輝府 (卫辉府)	Henan	
Huaiqing	懷慶府 (怀庆府)	Henan	
Guide	歸德府 (归德府)	Henan	
Runing	汝寧府 (汝宁府)	Henan	
Nanyang	南陽府 (南阳府)	Henan	
Hangzhou	杭州府	Zhejiang	
Wenzhou	溫州府 (温州府)	Zhejiang	
Jiaxing	嘉興府 (嘉兴府)	Zhejiang	
Jinhua	金華府 (金华府)	Zhejiang	
Quzhou	衢州府	Zhejiang	
Yanzhou	嚴州府 (严州府)	Zhejiang	
Huzhou	湖州府	Zhejiang	
Shaoxing	紹興府 (绍兴府)	Zhejiang	
Chizhou	處州府 (处州府)	Zhejiang	
Taizhou	臺州府 (台州府)	Zhejiang	
Ningbo	寧波府 (宁波府)	Zhejiang	
Nanchang	南昌府	Jiangxi	
Yuanzhou	袁州府	Jiangxi	
Ganzhou	贛州府 (赣州府)	Jiangxi	
Ji'an	吉安府	Jiangxi	
Jiujiang	九江府	Jiangxi	
Jianchang	建昌府	Jiangxi	
Guangxin	廣信府 (广信府)	Jiangxi	
Raozhou	饒州府 (饶州府)	Jiangxi	
Ruizhou	瑞州府	Jiangxi	
Nan'an	南安府	Jiangxi	
Nankang	南康府	Jiangxi	
Fuzhou	撫州府 (抚州府)	Jiangxi	
Linjiang	臨江府 (临江府)	Jiangxi	
Wuchang	武昌府	Huguang	
Yunyang	鄖陽府 (郧阳府)	Huguang	
Yongzhou	永州府	Huguang	
Yuezhou	岳州府	Huguang	
Hanyang	漢陽府 (汉阳府)	Huguang	
Jingzhou	荆州府	Huguang	
Hengzhou	衡州府	Huguang	
Huanghzou	黃州府 (黄州府)	Huguang	
Chengtian	承天府	Huguang	
Changde	常德府	Huguang	
Xiangyang	襄陽府 (襄阳府)	Huguang	
Chenzhou	辰州府	Huguang	
Changsha	長沙府 (长沙府)	Huguang	
De'an	德安府	Huguang	
Baoqing	宝慶府 (宝庆府)	Huguang	
Liping	黎平府	Huguang	
Chengdu	成都府	Sichuan	
Jiading	嘉定府	Sichuan	
Kuizhou	夔州府	Sichuan	
Chongqing	重慶府 (重庆府)	Sichuan	
Shunqing	順慶府 (顺庆府)	Sichuan	
Xuzhou	敘州府 (叙州府)	Sichuan	
Zhenxiang	鎮雄府 (镇雄府)	Sichuan	
Baoning	保寧府 (保宁府)	Sichuan	
Mahu	馬湖府 (马湖府)	Sichuan	
Long'an	龍安府 (龙安府)	Sichuan	
Guangzhou	廣州府 (广州府)	Guangdong	
Shaozhou	韶州府	Guangdong	
Huizhou	惠州府	Guangdong	
Qiongzhou	瓊州府 (琼州府)	Guangdong	
Zhaoqing	肇慶府 (肇庆府)	Guangdong	
Gaozhou	高州府	Guangdong	
Chaozhou	潮州府	Guangdong	
Nanxiong	南雄府	Guangdong	
Leizhou	雷州府	Guangdong	
Lianzhou	廉州府	Guangdong	
Guilin	桂林府	Guangxi	
Pingle	平樂府 (平乐府)	Guangxi	
Wuzhou	梧州府	Guangxi	
Xunzhou	潯州府 (浔州府)	Guangxi	
Liuzhou	柳州府	Guangxi	
Qingyuan	慶遠府 (庆远府)	Guangxi	
Nanning	南寧府 (南宁府)	Guangxi	
Si'en	思恩軍民府 (思恩军民府)	Guangxi	
Taiping	太平府	Guangxi	
Siming	思明府	Guangxi	
Zhen'an	鎮安府 (镇安府)	Guangxi	
Fuzhou	福州府	Fujian	
Yanping	延平府	Fujian	
Jianning	建寧府 (建宁府)	Fujian	
Xinghua	興化府 (兴化府)	Fujian	
Zhangzhou	漳州府	Fujian	
Shaowu	邵武府	Fujian	
Quanzhou	泉州府	Fujian	
Tingzhou	汀州府	Fujian	
Yunnan	雲南府 (云南府)	Yunnan	
Yongchang	永昌軍民府 (永昌军民府)	Yunnan	
Yongning	永寧府 (永宁府)	Yunnan	
Heqing	鶴慶軍民府 (鹤庆军民府)	Yunnan	
Qujing	曲靖軍民府 (曲靖军民府)	Yunnan	
Jingdong	景東府 (景东府)	Yunnan	
Yuanjiang	元江軍民府	Yunnan	
Guangxi	廣西府 (广西府)	Yunnan	
Guangnan	廣南府 (广南府)	Yunnan	
Shunning	順寧府 (顺宁府)	Yunnan	
Xundian	尋甸府 (寻甸府)	Yunnan	
Chuxiong	楚雄府	Yunnan	
Chengjiang	澂江府	Yunnan	
Zhenyuan	鎮沅府 (镇沅府)	Yunnan	
Dali	大理府	Yunnan	
Wuding	武定府	Yunnan	
Menghua	蒙化府	Yunnan	
Menggen	孟艮禦夷府 (孟艮御夷府)	Yunnan	
Mengding	孟定禦夷府 (孟定御夷府)	Yunnan	
Yao'an	姚安府	Yunnan	
Lijiang	麗江軍民府 (丽江军民府)	Yunnan	
Lin'an	臨安府 (临安府)	Yunnan	
Pingmian	平緬府 (平缅府)	Yunnan	
Meng'ai	孟愛府 (孟爱府)	Yunnan	
Menglong	孟隆府	Yunnan	
Muduo	木朵府	Yunnan	
Mulai	木來府 (木来府)	Yunnan	
Tongxi	通西府	Yunnan	
Chengfan→Guiyang	程番府→貴陽府 (贵阳府)	Guizhou	
Anshun	安順軍民府 (安顺军民府)	Guizhou	
Sinan	思南府	Guizhou	
Sizhou	思州府	Guizhou	
Shiqian	石阡府	Guizhou	
Zhenyuan	鎮遠府 (镇远府)	Guizhou	
Tongren	銅仁府 (铜仁府)	Guizhou	
Duyun	都勻府 (都匀府)	Guizhou	
Pu'an	普安軍民府 (普安军民府)	Guizhou	
Puding	普定軍民府 (普定军民府)	Guizhou	
Pingyue	平越軍民府 (平越军民府)	Guizhou	
Liping	黎平府	Guizhou	
Jiaozhou	交州府	Jiaozhi (1407-1428)	
Beijiang	北江府	Jiaozhi (1407-1428)	Bắc Giang
Liangjiang	諒江府 (谅江府)	Jiaozhi (1407-1428)	Lạng Giang District
Sanjiang	三江府	Jiaozhi (1407-1428)	
Jianping	建平府	Jiaozhi (1407-1428)	
Xin'an	新安府	Jiaozhi (1407-1428)	
Jianchang	建昌府	Jiaozhi (1407-1428)	
Fenghua	奉化府	Jiaozhi (1407-1428)	
Qinghua	清化府	Jiaozhi (1407-1428)	Thanh Hóa
Zhenman	鎮蠻府 (镇蛮府)	Jiaozhi (1407-1428)	Hưng Hà District
Liangshan	諒山府 (谅山府)	Jiaozhi (1407-1428)	Lạng Sơn
Xinping	新平府	Jiaozhi (1407-1428)	
Yanzhou	演州府	Jiaozhi (1407-1428)	Diễn Châu District
Yizhou	乂安府	Jiaozhi (1407-1428)	
Shunhua	順化府 (顺化府)	Jiaozhi (1407-1428)	Huế
Taiyuan	太原府	Jiaozhi (1407-1428)	Thái Nguyên
Xuanhua	宣化府	Jiaozhi (1407-1428)	Tuyên Quang
Shenghua	升華府 (升华府)	Jiaozhi (1407-1428)	

== Qing dynasty ==
- (1st) Province-level division: "Province" (省; shěng)

Total: 218 prefectures

City	Chinese	Province	Location of prefectural seat
Shuntian	順天府 (顺天府)	Zhili	
Yongping	永平府	Zhili	
Baoding	保定府	Zhili	
Zhengding	正定府	Zhili	
Hejian	河間府 (河间府)	Zhili	
Daming	大名府	Zhili	
Shunde	順德府 (顺德府)	Zhili	
Guangping	廣平府 (广平府)	Zhili	
Chengde	承德府	Zhili	
Chaoyang	朝陽府 (朝阳府)	Zhili	
Xuanhua	宣化府	Zhili	
Jinan	濟南府 (济南府)	Shandong	
Dongchang	東昌府 (东昌府)	Shandong	
Tai'an	泰安府	Shandong	
Wuding	武定府	Shandong	
Dengzhou	登州府	Shandong	
Laizhou	萊州府 (莱州府)	Shandong	
Qingzhou	青州府	Shandong	
Yanzhou	兗州府	Shandong	
Yizhou	沂州府	Shandong	
Caozhou	曹州府	Shandong	
Kaifeng	開封府 (开封府)	Henan	
Guide	歸德府 (归德府)	Henan	
Chenzhou	陳州府 (陈州府)	Henan	
Zhangde	彰德府	Henan	
Weihui	衛輝府 (卫辉府)	Henan	
Huaiqing	懷慶府 (怀庆府)	Henan	
Henan	河南府	Henan	
Nanyang	南陽府 (南阳府)	Henan	
Runing	汝寧府 (汝宁府)	Henan	
Taiyuan	太原府	Shanxi	
Fenzhou	汾州府	Shanxi	
Lu'an	潞安府	Shanxi	
Zezhou	澤州府 (泽州府)	Shanxi	
Puzhou	蒲州府	Shanxi	
Pingyang	平陽府 (平阳府)	Shanxi	
Datong	大同府	Shanxi	
Shuoping	朔平府	Shanxi	
Ningwu	甯武府 (宁武府)	Shanxi	
Lanzhou	蘭州府 (兰州府)	Gansu	
Pingliang	平涼府	Gansu	
Qingyang	慶陽府 (庆阳府)	Gansu	
Ningxia	寧夏府 (宁夏府)	Gansu	
Xining	西寧府 (西宁府)	Gansu	
Liangzhou	涼州府	Gansu	
Ganzhou	甘州府	Gansu	
Gongchang	鞏昌府 (巩昌府)	Gansu	
Xi'an	西安府	Shaanxi	
Tongzhou	同州府	Shaanxi	
Fengxiang	鳳翔府 (凤翔府)	Shaanxi	
Hanzhong	漢中府 (汉中府)	Shaanxi	
Xing'an	興安府 (兴安府)	Shaanxi	
Yan'an	延安府	Shaanxi	
Yulin	榆林府	Shaanxi	
Dihua	迪化府	Xinjiang	
Yili	伊犁府	Xinjiang	
Wensu	溫宿府 (温宿府)	Xinjiang	
Yanqi	焉耆府	Xinjiang	
Shule	疏勒府	Xinjiang	
Shache	莎車府 (莎车府)	Xinjiang	
Zhenxi	鎮西府 (镇西府)	Xinjiang	
Jiangning	江寧府 (江宁府)	Jiangsu	
Yangzhou	揚州府 (扬州府)	Jiangsu	
Huai'an	淮安府	Jiangsu	
Changzhou	常州府	Jiangsu	
Zhenjiang	鎮江府 (镇江府)	Jiangsu	
Suzhou	蘇州府 (苏州府)	Jiangsu	
Songjiang	松江府	Jiangsu	
Xuzhou	徐州府	Jiangsu	
Anqing	安慶府 (安庆府)	Anhui	
Luzhou	廬州府 (庐州府)	Anhui	
Fengyang	鳳陽府 (凤阳府)	Anhui	
Yingzhou	潁州府 (颍州府)	Anhui	
Huizhou	徽州府	Anhui	
Ningguo	寧國府 (宁国府)	Anhui	
Chizhou	池州府	Anhui	
Taiping	太平府	Anhui	
Nanchang	南昌府	Jiangxi	
Jianchang	建昌府	Jiangxi	
Fuzhou	撫州府 (抚州府)	Jiangxi	
Yuanzhou	袁州府	Jiangxi	
Ruizhou	瑞州府	Jiangxi	
Linjiang	臨江府 (临江府)	Jiangxi	
Raozhou	饒州府 (饶州府)	Jiangxi	
Guangxin	廣信府 (广信府)	Jiangxi	
Jiujiang	九江府	Jiangxi	
Nankang	南康府	Jiangxi	
Ji'an	吉安府	Jiangxi	
Ganzhou	贛州府 (赣州府)	Jiangxi	
Nan'an	南安府	Jiangxi	
Fuzhou	福州府	Fujian	
Funing	福寧府 (福宁府)	Fujian	
Yanping	延平府	Fujian	
Jianning	建寧府 (建宁府)	Fujian	
Shaowu	邵武府	Fujian	
Tingzhou	汀州府	Fujian	
Zhangzhou	漳州府	Fujian	
Xinghua	興化府 (兴化府)	Fujian	
Qianzhou	泉州府	Fujian	
Hangzhou	杭州府	Zhejiang	
Jiaxing	嘉興府 (嘉兴府)	Zhejiang	
Huzhou	湖州府	Zhejiang	
Ningbo	寧波府 (宁波府)	Zhejiang	
Shaoxing	紹興府 (绍兴府)	Zhejiang	
Taizhou	臺州府 (台州府)	Zhejiang	
Jinhua	金華府 (金华府)	Zhejiang	
Quzhou	衢州府	Zhejiang	
Yanzhou	嚴州府 (严州府)	Zhejiang	
Wenzhou	溫州府 (温州府)	Zhejiang	
Chuzhou	處州府 (处州府)	Zhejiang	
Taiwan	臺灣府 (台湾府)	Taiwan	
Tainan	臺南府 (台南府)	Taiwan	
Taipei	臺北府 (台北府)	Taiwan	
Guangzhou	廣州府 (广州府)	Guangdong	
Zhaoqing	肇慶府 (肇庆府)	Guangdong	
Shaozhou	韶州府	Guangdong	
Huizhou	惠州府	Guangdong	
Chaozhou	潮州府	Guangdong	
Gaozhou	高州府	Guangdong	
Leizhou	雷州府	Guangdong	
Lianzhou	廉州府	Guangdong	
Qiongzhou	瓊州府 (琼州府)	Guangdong	
Guilin	桂林府	Guangxi	
Pingle	平樂府 (平乐府)	Guangxi	
Wuzhou	梧州府	Guangxi	
Liuzhou	柳州府	Guangxi	
Qingyuan	慶遠府 (庆远府)	Guangxi	
Si'en	思恩府	Guangxi	
Xunzhou	潯州府 (浔州府)	Guangxi	
Nanning	南寧府 (南宁府)	Guangxi	
Sicheng	泗城府	Guangxi	
Zhen'an	鎮安府 (镇安府)	Guangxi	
Taiping	太平府	Guangxi	
Wuchang	武昌府	Hubei	
Hanyang	漢陽府 (汉阳府)	Hubei	
Huangzhou	黃州府 (黄州府)	Hubei	
De'an	德安府	Hubei	
Anlu	安陸府 (安陆府)	Hubei	
Xiangyang	襄陽府 (襄阳府)	Hubei	
Yunyang	鄖陽府 (郧阳府)	Hubei	
Jingzhou	荊州府	Hubei	
Yichang	宜昌府	Hubei	
Shinan	施南府	Hunan	
Changsha	長沙府 (长沙府)	Hunan	
Baoqing	寶慶府 (宝庆府)	Hunan	
Yuezhou	岳州府	Hunan	
Changde	常德府	Hunan	
Hengzhou	衡州府	Hunan	
Yongzhou	永州府	Hunan	
Chenzhou	辰州府	Hunan	
Yuanzhou	沅州府	Hunan	
Yongshun	永順府 (永顺府)	Hunan	
Chengdu	成都府	Sichuan	
Long'an	龍安府 (龙安府)	Sichuan	
Chongqing	重慶府 (重庆府)	Sichuan	
Suiding	綏定府 (绥定府)	Sichuan	
Kuizhou	夔州府	Sichuan	
Shunqing	順慶府 (顺庆府)	Sichuan	
Tongchuan	潼川府	Sichuan	
Ningyuan	寧遠府 (宁远府)	Sichuan	
Yazhou	雅州府	Sichuan	
Jiading	嘉定府	Sichuan	
Kangding	康定府	Sichuan	
Ba'an	巴安府	Sichuan	
Dengke	登科府	Sichuan	
Xuzhou	敘州府 (叙州府)	Sichuan	
Yunnan	雲南府 (云南府)	Yunnan	
Dali	大理府	Yunnan	
Lijiang	麗江府 (丽江府)	Yunnan	
Chuxiong	楚雄府	Yunnan	
Yongchang	永昌府	Yunnan	
Shunning	順寧府 (顺宁府)	Yunnan	
Qujing	曲靖府	Yunnan	
Dongchuan	東川府 (东川府)	Yunnan	
Zhaotong	昭通府	Yunnan	
Lin'an	臨安府 (临安府)	Yunnan	
Guangnan	廣南府 (广南府)	Yunnan	
Kaihua	開化府 (开化府)	Yunnan	
Pu'er	普洱府	Yunnan	
Guiyang	貴陽府 (贵阳府)	Guizhou	
Anshun	安順府 (安顺府)	Guizhou	
Zunyi	遵義府 (遵义府)	Guizhou	
Dading	大定府	Guizhou	
Xingyi	興義府 (兴义府)	Guizhou	
Duyun	都勻府 (都匀府)	Guizhou	
Zhenyuan	鎮遠府 (镇远府)	Guizhou	
Sinan	思南府	Guizhou	
Sizhou	思州府	Guizhou	
Tongren	銅仁府 (铜仁府)	Guizhou	
Liping	黎平府	Guizhou	
Shiqian	石阡府	Guizhou	
Fengtian	奉天府	Fengtian	
Jinzhou	錦州府 (锦州府)	Fengtian	
Xinmin	新民府	Fengtian	
Xingjing	興京府 (兴京府)	Fengtian	
Changbai	長白府 (长白府)	Fengtian	
Hailong	海龍府 (海龙府)	Fengtian	
Changtu	昌圖府 (昌图府)	Fengtian	
Taonan	洮南府	Fengtian	
Jilin	吉林府	Jilin	
Changchun	長春府 (长春府)	Jilin	
Xincheng	新城府	Jilin	
Shuangcheng	雙城府 (双城府)	Jilin	
Binzhou	賓州府 (宾州府)	Jilin	
Wuchang	五常府	Jilin	
Yanji	延吉府	Jilin	
Ning'an	甯安府 (宁安府)	Jilin	
Dong'an	東安府 (东安府)	Jilin	
Yilan	依蘭府 (依兰府)	Jilin	
Linjiang	臨江府 (临江府)	Jilin	
Mishan	密山府	Jilin	
Longjiang	龍江府 (龙江府)	Heilongjiang	
Hulan	呼蘭府 (呼兰府)	Heilongjiang	
Suihua	綏化府 (绥化府)	Heilongjiang	
Hailun	海倫府 (海伦府)	Heilongjiang	
Nenjiang	嫩江府	Heilongjiang	
Heihe	黑河府	Heilongjiang	
Lubin	臚濱府 (胪滨府)	Heilongjiang	
