= 2013 Dingxi earthquakes =

Very strong fatal earthquakes in Gansu province, China

- Location within China
- UTC time: 2013-07-21 23:45:56
- ISC event: 608441184
- USGS-ANSS: ComCat
- Local date: 22 July 2013
- Local time: 07:45 (UTC+8)
- Magnitude: M_{s} 6.6 (CENC); M_{w} 5.9 (USGS); M_{w} 6.0 (EMSC)
- Depth: 20 kilometres (12 mi)
- Epicenter: 34.5°N 104.2°E
- Areas affected: China
- Max. intensity: MMI VII (Very strong)
- Casualties: 95 dead, 2,395 injured (as of 25 July 2013)

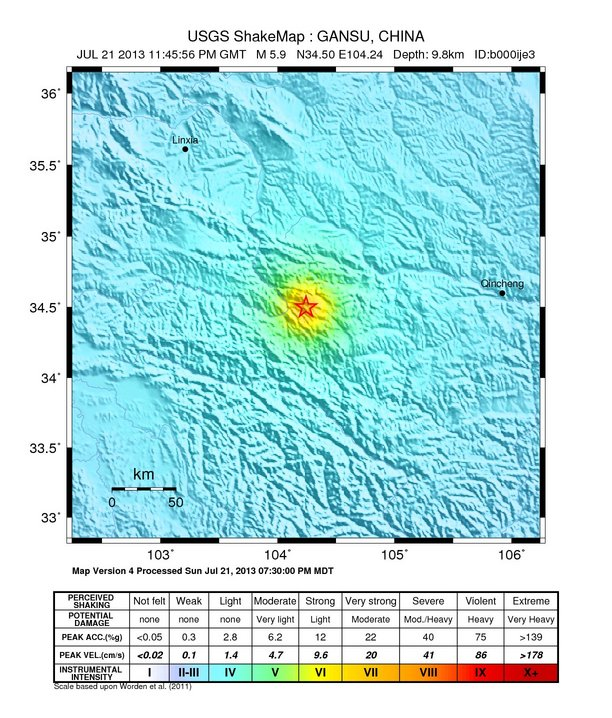
Shake map of the earthquake. (By United States Geological Survey)

Dingxi earthquakes
- Traditional Chinese: 定西地震
- Simplified Chinese: 定西地震
Transcriptions
Standard Mandarin
- Hanyu Pinyin: Dìngxī Dìzhèn

On 22 July 2013, a series of earthquakes occurred in Dingxi, Gansu. The first quake struck at 07:45 China Standard Time with an epicenter located at the border of Min County and Zhang County. The magnitude of the initial earthquake was placed at M_{s} 6.6 by the China Earthquake Data Center with a focal depth of 20.0 kilometres (12 mi). It was measured at M_{w} 5.9 by the United States Geological Survey (USGS) and M_{w} 6.0 by the European Alert System. Another strong quake occurred about one hour later, measuring 5.6 magnitude by the USGS. As of 18:00 CST (10:00 UTC), 22 July 2013, 422 aftershocks had been recorded. The earthquakes were also felt in the nearby cities of Tianshui and Lanzhou in Gansu, as well as Xi'an, Baoji, and Xianyang in neighbouring Shaanxi.

As of 23:00 CST, 23 July 2013, the earthquakes had caused at least 95 deaths, and more than 2,300 people were injured.

== Background ==
The tremor occurred less than 14 kilometres (9 mi) from the Lintan-Dangchang fault line (Chinese: 临潭-宕昌断裂带). Since recorded history 25 earthquakes of more than 5.0 magnitude have occurred within a 200 kilometres (124 mi) radius from the current epicenter, the earliest being the 193 BC Lintao earthquake which measured at 6.5 magnitude, while the strongest was the 8.0-magnitude 1654 Tianshui earthquake.

== Effects ==
Most of the casualties occurred in Min County, located 15 kilometres (9 mi) from the epicenter, which reported 87 deaths.

According to the Gansu provincial officials, more than 1,200 buildings have collapsed and over 21,000 severely damaged. Many local buildings, often crudely constructed, were buried in the landslides caused by the earthquakes. Within the disaster zone, 20% of the buildings have collapsed and 60% are damaged. 27,360 people are estimated to have been displaced in Zhang County alone.

Communication was cut off to 13 townships in Zhang County and many villages in Meichuan, Min County. Five towns in eastern Min County have lost power.

== Aftershocks ==
Time (CST)	Coordinates	Magnitude	Depth (km)
22 July 2013 07:45:09	34°30′N 104°12′E	3.4	7
22 July 2013 08:06:38	34°30′N 104°12′E	3.0	7
22 July 2013 08:09:43	34°30′N 104°12′E	3.9	6
22 July 2013 08:16:45	34°30′N 104°12′E	3.3	10
22 July 2013 09:12:34	34°36′N 104°12′E	5.6	14
22 July 2013 09:23:28	34°36′N 104°12′E	3.0	7
22 July 2013 15:28:08	34°30′N 104°12′E	3.7	7
23 July 2013 16:46:46	34°36′N 104°12′E	3.1	7

(Source:)

== Relief efforts ==
On the day of the earthquakes, General-secretary of CCP and Chinese President Xi Jinping ordered "all-out rescue efforts". By afternoon the two top leaders of Gansu Province, Communist Party secretary Wang Sanyun and Governor Liu Weiping, along with 1,800 police officers and local officials, had arrived in the earthquake-stricken area. The People's Liberation Army's Lanzhou Military Region, which is headquartered 230 kilometres (143 mi) from the disaster zone, had sent 1,078 troops to join the relief efforts by mid-afternoon.

== See also ==
- List of earthquakes in 2013
- List of earthquakes in China
