= Gongchang, Gansu =

Gongchang 巩昌镇
- Town
- Interactive map of Gongchang
- Coordinates: 34°59′53″N 104°38′38″E
- Country: People's Republic of China
- Province: Gansu
- Prefecture-level city: Dingxi
- County: Longxi
- Village-level divisions: 6 residential communities 25 villages
- Elevation: 1,733 m (5,686 ft)

Population (2000)
  - Total: 49,475
- Time zone: UTC+8 (China Standard)
- Postal code: 748100
- Area code: 0932

Gongchang (simplified Chinese: 巩昌; traditional Chinese: 鞏昌; pinyin: Gǒngchāng) is a town in and the county seat of Longxi County, in southeastern Gansu province, China. As of 2011 it has six residential communities (社区) and 25 villages under its administration.

It was the administrative centre of the historic Gongchang prefecture, which was then part of Shaanxi.

== See also ==
- List of township-level divisions of Gansu
