= Caizi, Gansu =

Caizi 菜子镇
- Town
- Location in Gansu
- Coordinates: 34°59′22″N 104°28′23″E
- Country: People's Republic of China
- Province: Gansu
- Prefecture-level city: Dingxi
- County: Longxi County
- Time zone: UTC+8 (China Standard)

Caizi (Chinese: 菜子; pinyin: Càizǐ) is a town in Longxi County, Gansu province, China. As of 2020, it administers the following 18 villages:

- Caizi Village
- Nanshilipu Village (南十里铺村)
- Nan'ershilipu Village (南二十里铺村)
- Banyang Village (板羊村)
- Qianhe Village (浅河村)
- Dongfeng Village (东风村)
- Mouhe Village (牟河村)
- Xianfeng Village (先锋村)
- Houjiamen Village (侯家门村)
- Dongjiasi Village (董家寺村)
- Majiazhuang Village (马家庄村)
- Jiuzhuang Village (旧庄村)
- Baihua Village (白桦村)
- Xueshan Village (雪山村)
- Sidian Village (四店村)
- Zhongchuan Village (中川村)
- Yuange Village (元阁村)
- Buyun Village (步云村)
