= Tongwei County =

Tongwei County 通渭县
- County
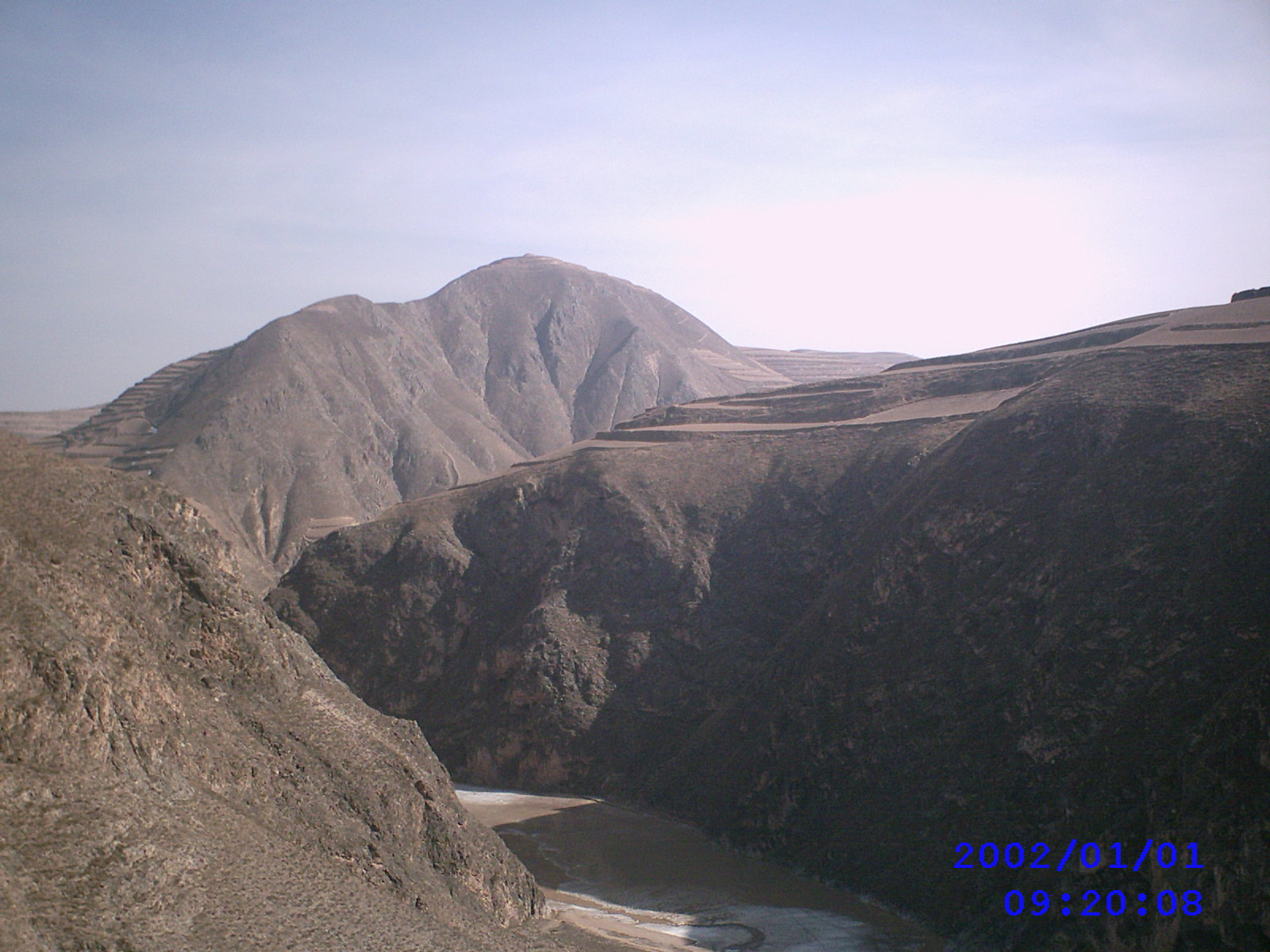
- Landscape of Tongwei County

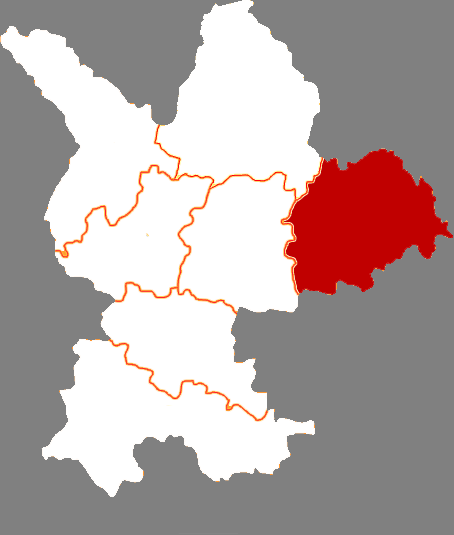
- Tongwei in Dingxi

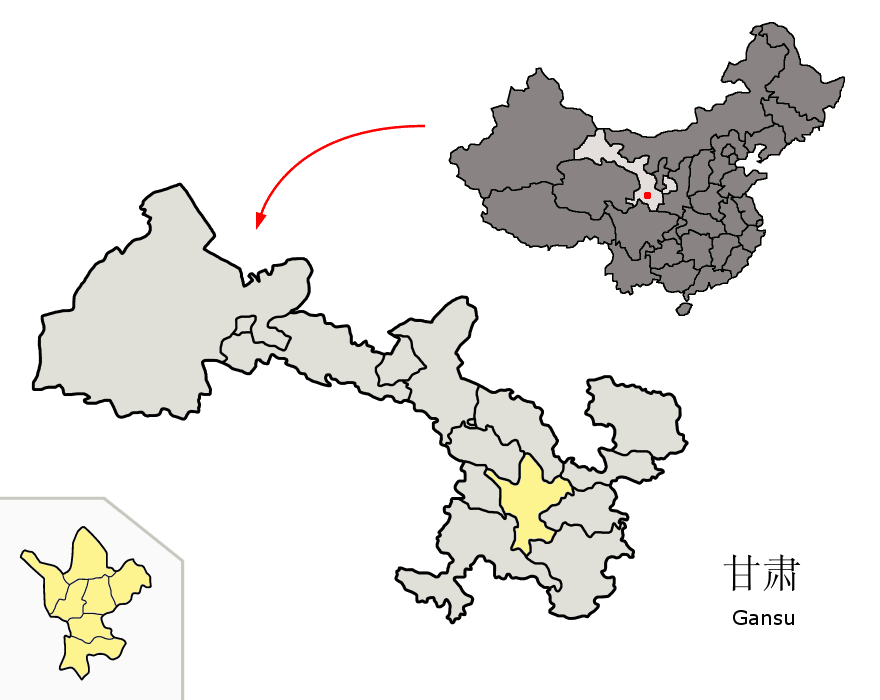
- Dingxi in Gansu
- Coordinates: 35°12′40″N 105°14′33″E
- Country: China
- Province: Gansu
- Prefecture-level city: Dingxi
- County seat: Pingxiang

Area
  - Land: 2,908.5 km^{2} (1,123.0 sq mi)

Population (2018)
  - Total: 438,900
  - Density: 150.9/km^{2} (390.8/sq mi)
- Time zone: UTC+8 (China Standard)
- Postal code: 743300

Tongwei County is located in the middle of Gansu province, the People's Republic of China, with east longitude between 104°57' and north latitude between 34°55' and 35°29'. It is under the administration of the prefecture-level city of Dingxi. Its postal code is 743300. The total population at the end of 2009 was 458 thousand, including agricultural population of 405.8 thousand which accounts for 88.6% of the total population, and the total number of households were 110.1 thousand, including 87.5 thousand rural households that account for 79.47% of the total households. Tongwei County is thus an area that is predominant on agriculture. Due to the loess landscape with steep gullies, the roads and rural settlement layout is very unevenly distributed.

== History ==
According to archaeological findings, people inhabited in Tongwei county four to five thousand years ago. Pottery of Yuanyu culture and Qijia culture has been found in Tongwei. The area has been an administrative county since the 3rd year of Yuanding (元鼎三年, 113 BC).

Tongwei is the well fortified borderland for many Chinese dynasties from Qin to Han, thus known as The Land of Thousand Forts (千堡之乡).

Tongwei county was formally created in fifth year of Congning era, Northern Song dynasty (1106 AD). It suffered extensive damage and saw 73,000 deaths during the 1718 Tongwei–Gansu earthquake.

During Great Chinese Famine, at least 80,000 people died from famine.

== Administrative divisions ==
Tongwei is divided into 14 towns and 4 townships.

Towns

- Pingxiang (平襄镇)
- Maying (马营镇)
- Jichuan (鸡川镇)
- Bangluo (榜罗镇)
- Changjiahe (常家河镇)
- Yigangchuan (义岗川镇)
- Longyang (陇阳镇)
- Longshan (陇山镇)
- Longchuan (陇川镇)
- Biyu (碧玉镇)
- Xiangnan (襄南镇)
- Shichuan (什川镇)
- Huajialing (华家岭镇)
- Beichengpu (北城铺镇)

Townships

- Xinjing Township (新景乡)
- Lijiadian Township (李家店乡)
- Disanpu Township (第三铺乡)
- Sizichuan Township (寺子川乡)

== Climate ==
Climate data for Tongwei, elevation 1,770 m (5,810 ft), (1991–2020 normals, extremes 1981–2010)
Month	Jan	Feb	Mar	Apr	May	Jun	Jul	Aug	Sep	Oct	Nov	Dec	Year
Record high °C (°F)	13.7 (56.7)	18.3 (64.9)	25.9 (78.6)	29.2 (84.6)	30.2 (86.4)	32.5 (90.5)	33.9 (93.0)	32.7 (90.9)	30.9 (87.6)	24.6 (76.3)	17.9 (64.2)	15.1 (59.2)	33.9 (93.0)
Mean daily maximum °C (°F)	0.9 (33.6)	4.2 (39.6)	10.1 (50.2)	16.7 (62.1)	20.7 (69.3)	24.2 (75.6)	25.9 (78.6)	24.6 (76.3)	19.3 (66.7)	13.6 (56.5)	8.0 (46.4)	2.7 (36.9)	14.2 (57.7)
Daily mean °C (°F)	−6.6 (20.1)	−2.7 (27.1)	3.0 (37.4)	9.2 (48.6)	13.7 (56.7)	17.5 (63.5)	19.7 (67.5)	18.6 (65.5)	13.8 (56.8)	7.7 (45.9)	1.0 (33.8)	−5.0 (23.0)	7.5 (45.5)
Mean daily minimum °C (°F)	−12.5 (9.5)	−8.0 (17.6)	−2.6 (27.3)	2.5 (36.5)	7.0 (44.6)	11.2 (52.2)	14.2 (57.6)	13.6 (56.5)	9.4 (48.9)	3.2 (37.8)	−3.9 (25.0)	−10.5 (13.1)	2.0 (35.6)
Record low °C (°F)	−24.9 (−12.8)	−22.9 (−9.2)	−16.0 (3.2)	−7.8 (18.0)	−4.8 (23.4)	1.4 (34.5)	4.8 (40.6)	4.3 (39.7)	−1.1 (30.0)	−10.4 (13.3)	−18.6 (−1.5)	−27.1 (−16.8)	−27.1 (−16.8)
Average precipitation mm (inches)	4.0 (0.16)	5.2 (0.20)	11.0 (0.43)	22.4 (0.88)	46.0 (1.81)	57.5 (2.26)	80.3 (3.16)	76.9 (3.03)	53.6 (2.11)	31.1 (1.22)	6.9 (0.27)	1.4 (0.06)	396.3 (15.59)
Average precipitation days (≥ 0.1 mm)	4.0	4.5	5.9	6.8	10.0	11.5	11.7	11.4	11.9	9.0	4.8	2.3	93.8
Average snowy days	9.0	9.0	6.4	1.8	0.2	0	0	0	0	1.4	4.7	5.9	38.4
Average relative humidity (%)	67	67	63	60	61	67	72	75	80	79	75	68	70
Mean monthly sunshine hours	168.5	150.5	179.0	206.7	217.1	207.4	206.1	191.3	133.3	132.6	151.4	172.4	2,116.3
Percentage possible sunshine	54	49	48	52	50	48	47	46	36	38	50	57	48
Source: China Meteorological Administration

Climate data for Huajialing, Tongwei (elevation 2,451 m (8,041 ft), 1991–2020 normals, extremes 1981–2010)
Month	Jan	Feb	Mar	Apr	May	Jun	Jul	Aug	Sep	Oct	Nov	Dec	Year
Record high °C (°F)	9.4 (48.9)	14.9 (58.8)	20.0 (68.0)	24.1 (75.4)	24.9 (76.8)	26.9 (80.4)	28.4 (83.1)	27.7 (81.9)	25.0 (77.0)	18.5 (65.3)	14.5 (58.1)	10.0 (50.0)	28.4 (83.1)
Mean daily maximum °C (°F)	−3.5 (25.7)	−0.9 (30.4)	4.5 (40.1)	11.0 (51.8)	15.0 (59.0)	18.3 (64.9)	20.1 (68.2)	19.0 (66.2)	14.1 (57.4)	8.6 (47.5)	3.5 (38.3)	−1.6 (29.1)	9.0 (48.2)
Daily mean °C (°F)	−8.1 (17.4)	−5.5 (22.1)	−0.6 (30.9)	5.4 (41.7)	9.6 (49.3)	13.4 (56.1)	15.4 (59.7)	14.4 (57.9)	10.0 (50.0)	4.5 (40.1)	−1.0 (30.2)	−6.2 (20.8)	4.3 (39.7)
Mean daily minimum °C (°F)	−11.1 (12.0)	−8.4 (16.9)	−3.8 (25.2)	1.4 (34.5)	5.6 (42.1)	9.8 (49.6)	12.0 (53.6)	11.3 (52.3)	7.3 (45.1)	1.8 (35.2)	−3.9 (25.0)	−9.3 (15.3)	1.1 (33.9)
Record low °C (°F)	−24.0 (−11.2)	−21.1 (−6.0)	−19.5 (−3.1)	−12.8 (9.0)	−6.1 (21.0)	−0.8 (30.6)	5.8 (42.4)	3.2 (37.8)	−1.7 (28.9)	−14.9 (5.2)	−18.6 (−1.5)	−25.5 (−13.9)	−25.5 (−13.9)
Average precipitation mm (inches)	5.4 (0.21)	7.2 (0.28)	14.3 (0.56)	29.7 (1.17)	56.1 (2.21)	68.4 (2.69)	95.6 (3.76)	87.8 (3.46)	60.1 (2.37)	35.6 (1.40)	9.0 (0.35)	2.5 (0.10)	471.7 (18.56)
Average precipitation days (≥ 0.1 mm)	6.6	6.6	8.3	8.6	10.8	12.5	13.7	12.2	12.9	10.4	5.7	3.8	112.1
Average snowy days	9.2	9.2	9.1	5.2	1.6	0.1	0	0	0.2	4.7	6.4	5.9	51.6
Average relative humidity (%)	65	69	65	61	65	70	78	81	83	79	69	61	71
Mean monthly sunshine hours	202.7	183.8	212.7	228.8	236.7	212.8	213.6	202.1	151.0	163.2	191.3	211.6	2,410.3
Percentage possible sunshine	65	59	57	58	54	49	49	49	41	47	63	70	55
Source: China Meteorological Administration

== Economy ==
Up to 1000MW of wind energy capacity is installed in the county. Natural resources include geothermal (hot springs), granite, marble, andesite, ferrite and kaolin.

The county has a grain output of 1.2 million tonnes as well as growing significant amounts of corn, potato, other grains and fruit trees. Recently, Tongwei has become the largest grower of honeysuckle for traditional medicine.

The county's GDP was 1,441 billion, and 3146.86 yuan per capita, rural per capita net income was 2259.27 yuan, the two are all lower than the average of the entire province, and the economic development is relatively backward.

It is one of the 18 drought counties, 23 provincial 'deep poverty counties', and 41 national help-the-poor counties. As of 2017, 17.% of the population still lived in poverty.

== See also ==
- Buzi (fortification), type of structure numerous in Tongwei County
- List of administrative divisions of Gansu
