= Nanping, Lintao =

Nanping 南屏镇
- Town
- Location within Gansu
- Coordinates: 35.1635571°N 103.8132359°E
- Country: China
- Province: Gansu
- Prefecture-level city: Dingxi
- County: Lintao

Area
  - Total: 140.89 km^{2} (54.40 sq mi)

Population (2018)
  - Total: 30,111

Nanping is a town of Lintao County, Dingxi City, Gansu, China.

Nanping is noted for its Nuo opera, which has been recognized as intangible cultural heritage of Gansu province.
