= Taoyang =

Taoyang 洮阳镇
- Town
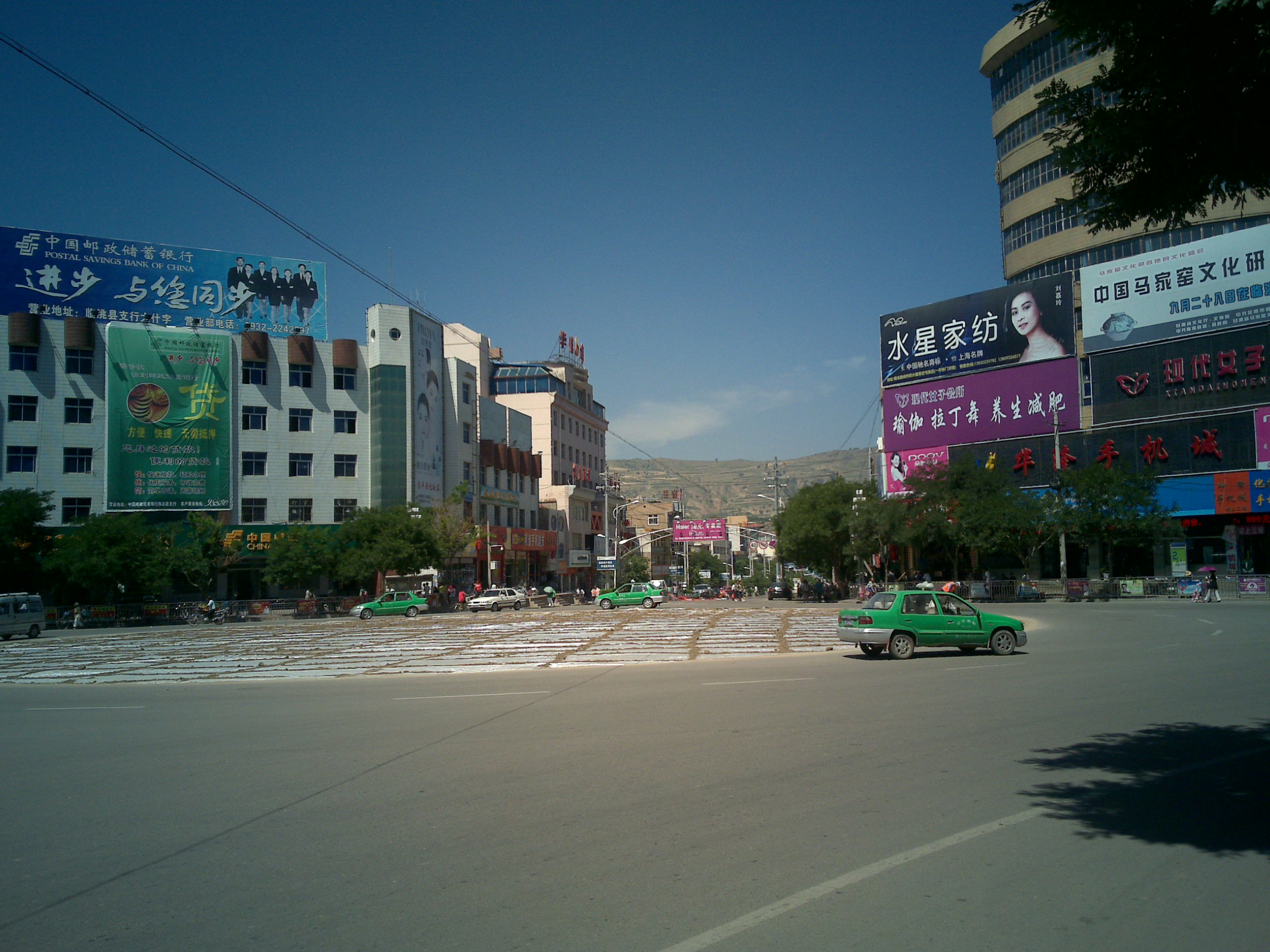

- Location within Gansu
- Coordinates: 35.3754°N 103.86125°E
- Country: China
- Province: Gansu
- Prefecture-level city: Dingxi
- County: Lintao

Area
  - Town: 134.78 km^{2} (52.04 sq mi)

Population
  - Town: 108,000
  - Rural: 56,976

Taoyang is a town and the county seat of Lintao County, Dingxi, Gansu, China. It is located centrally in Lintao at a junction of major roads.

The town relies mainly on agriculture, supported by favourable irrigation supply from the Tao River. It is also a tourist destination, owing to historic sites and temples. The Gansu Majiayao Painted Pottery Culture Museum is located in Taoyang.

Taoyang governs 30 villages and 12 residential communities.
