= Caizi Township =

Caizi Township 菜子乡
- Township
- Location within Sichuan Location within China
- Coordinates: 27°40′33″N 102°40′14″E
- Country: China
- Province: Sichuan
- Prefecture: Liangshan Yi Autonomous Prefecture
- County: Puge County

Area
  - Total: 47.7 km^{2} (18.4 sq mi)

Population (2013)
  - Total: 3,000
- Postal code: 615300
- Area code: 0834

Caizi Township (Chinese: 菜子乡; pinyin: Càizǐ xiāng) is a township in Puge County, Liangshan Yi Autonomous Prefecture, Sichuan, China. As of 2020, Caizi's jurisdicted villages are:

- Weixing Village (卫星村)
- Qianjin Village (前进村)
- Gangtie Village (钢铁村)
- Tuanjie Village (团结村)
- Xianfeng Village (先锋村)

== See also ==
- List of township-level divisions of Sichuan
