= Anding, Dingxi =

Anding 安定区 Dingxi County
- District
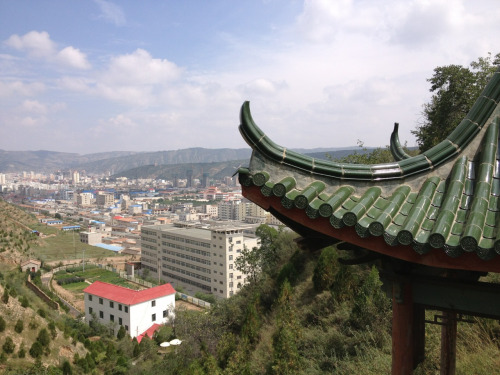

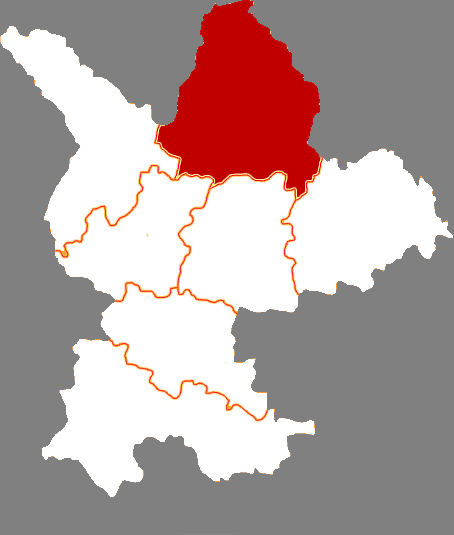
- Anding in Dingxi

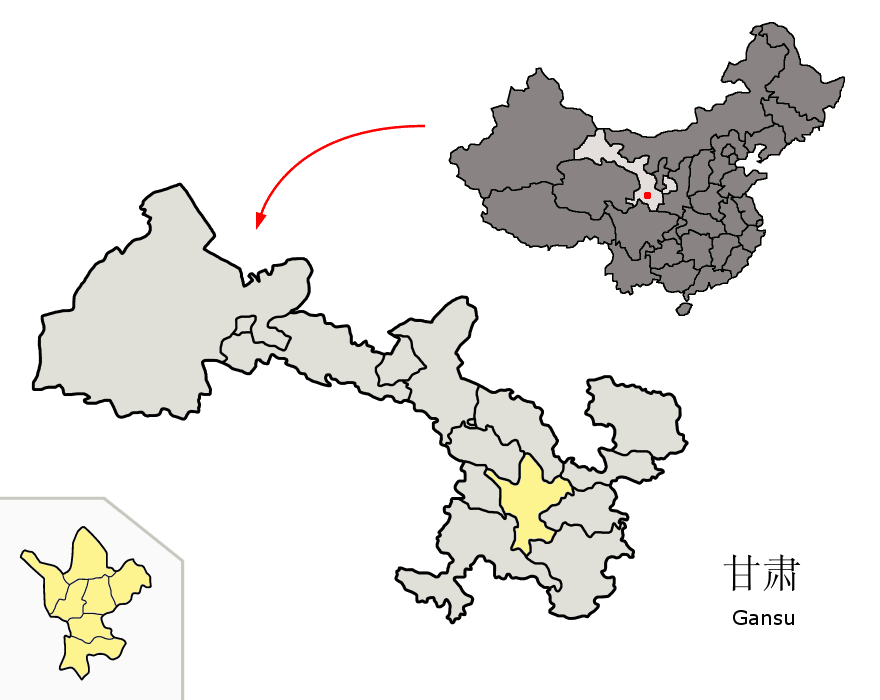
- Dingxi in Gansu

- Location in Gansu
- Coordinates (Anding District government): 35°34′50″N 104°36′39″E
- Country: China
- Province: Gansu
- Prefecture-level city: Dingxi
- District seat: Yongdinglu

Area
  - District: 4,225 km^{2} (1,631 sq mi)

Population (2020 census)
  - District: 422,383
  - Density: 99.97/km^{2} (258.9/sq mi)
  - Rural: 362,400
- Time zone: UTC+8 (China Standard)
- Postal code: 743000
- Website: www.anding.gov.cn

Anding (Chinese: 安定; pinyin: Āndìng) is a district of the city of Dingxi, Gansu province, China.

The area of Anding District has been inhabited since the Neolithic era, with sites of the Majiayao culture and Qijia culture being discovered in the area. Dingxi city was established in 1096 as a military base of the northern Gong state. By 1142 it became a county and by 1216 Dingxi became the seat of a prefecture. In 2003, Dingxi County became Anding District as it is currently known.

Located entirely on the Loess Plateau, the economy of Anding District is primarily based around agriculture. Potatoes, corn, flax and beans being the most grown.

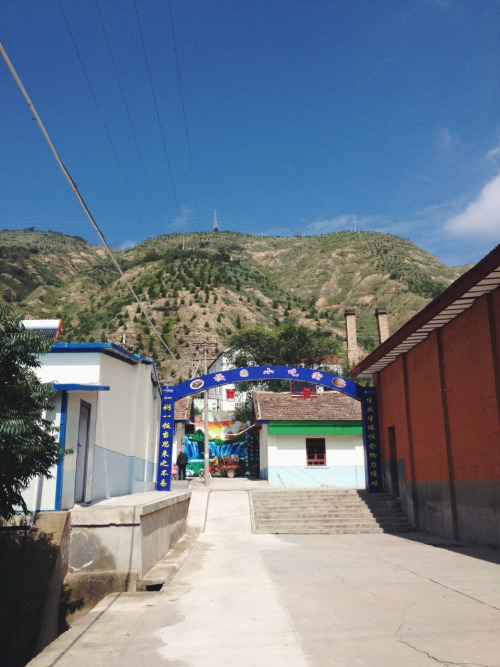
View of the mountain behind Dingxi Teacher's College

In 2020 a CGTN reporter visited the village school of Xuechuan Village (薛川村) in Ningyuan town, which in 2020 had eight students; at its peak it had 600. The school was presented as an illustration of the issues of left-behind children, rural poverty and urbanisation.

== Administrative divisions ==
Anding District is divided to 3 subdistricts, 12 towns and 7 townships.

Subdistricts

- Zhonghualu Subdistrict (中华路街道)
- Yongdinglu Subdistrict (永定路街道)
- Futailu Subdistrict (福台路街道)

Towns

- Fengxiang (凤翔镇)
- Neiguanying (内官营镇)
- Cangkou (巉口镇)
- Chenggouyi (称钩驿镇)
- Lujiagou (鲁家沟镇)
- Xigongyi (西巩驿镇)
- Ningyuan (宁远镇)
- Lijiabao (李家堡镇)
- Tuanjie (团结镇)
- Xiangquan (香泉镇)
- Fujiachuan (符家川镇)
- Gejiacha (葛家岔镇)

Townships

- Bailu Township (白碌乡)
- Shixiawan Township (石峡湾乡)
- Xinji Township (新集乡)
- Qinglanshan Township (青岚山乡)
- Gaofeng Township (高峰乡)
- Shiquan Township (石泉乡)
- Xingyuan Township (杏园乡)

== See also ==
- List of administrative divisions of Gansu
