= 1654 Tianshui earthquake =

1654 earthquake in Gansu province, Ming dynasty

- Location within China
- Local time: 21:00 to 23:00
- Magnitude: M_{w} 7.0
- Depth: 20 kilometres (12 mi)
- Epicenter: 34.3°N 105.5°E
- Areas affected: China
- Max. intensity: CSIS XI
- Casualties: 30,000 dead

The 1654 Tianshui earthquake occurred on July 21 in Tianshui, Gansu Province, Ming dynasty sometime between 21:00 and 23:00 local time. The event had an estimated moment magnitude of 7.0 and was assigned a maximum intensity of XI on the China seismic intensity scale. Resulting in extreme damage and affecting at least four provinces, the quake killed approximately 30,000 people.

== Tectonic setting ==
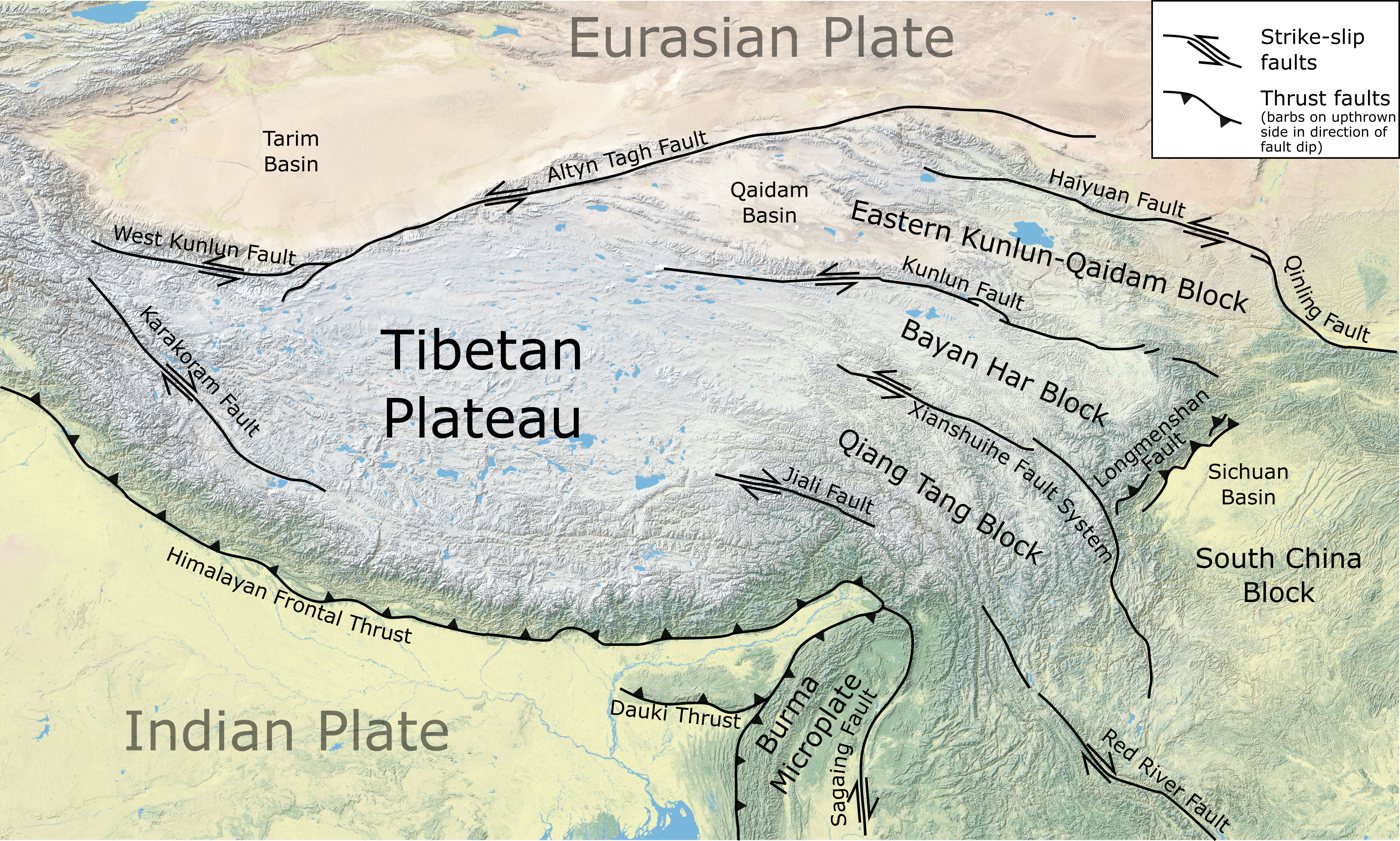
A map of the India-Asia deformation zone with active faults in the region.

The active plate tectonics of Gansu Province located on the Tibetan Plateau is dominated by the north–south continental collision of the Indian Plate and Eurasian Plate. As the Indian Plate collides along a convergent plate boundary known as the Main Himalayan Thrust, it being of continental crust does not subduct, rather, it plows into the Eurasian Plate. This process severely deforms the Eurasian Plate, uplifting the crust, forming the Tibetan Plateau. The force of the Indian Plate converging pushes the Tibetan Plateau east, towards the Sichuan Basin, forming another zone of collision. This collision and resulting crustal deformation of the Eurasian Plate is accommodated by the Xianshuihe fault system, Haiyuan Fault, Kunlun Fault, Altyn Tagh fault, and Longmenshan Fault. The presence of active faults in Sichuan makes the region vulnerable to damaging earthquakes. The very deadly 2008 Sichuan earthquake occurred due to a thrust fault rupture on the Longmenshan Fault. The 1920 Haiyuan and 1927 Gulang earthquakes occurred due to ruptures along the Haiyuan Fault.

== Earthquake ==
The Lixian-Luojiapu Fault Zone located at the triple junction between the North China Craton, Tibetan Plateau, and South China Craton was identified as the source of the earthquake. The fault is characterized by left-lateral strike-slip and normal sense of slip, and strikes in an east northeast direction. It formed in the late Quaternary as a system of three fault strands with a length of 150 km. The fault has an average horizontal and vertical displacement rate of 0.95 mm/yr and 0.35 mm/yr respectively. Surface ruptures on two segments of the fault zone; the Tanchang-Lixian and the eastern Lixian-Luojiapu subsegments, were positively identified and corresponded to the event. The earthquake rupture also involved one on the West Qinling Fault, located north of the Lixian-Luojiapu Fault Zone. The West Qinling Fault is another major left-lateral fault that strikes west northwest and runs for a much longer length.

The rupture on the Lixian-Luojiapu Fault Zone is also consistent with the reported isoseismal intensities obtained from the historical records. It is estimated that the total rupture length on the structure was 106 km. Paleoseismology studies on the West Qinling Fault found surface ruptures which were dated and corresponded to the event. A recent (2022) study of earthquakes in the region reevaluated the magnitude to 7.0 M_{w}, a revision from older studies that estimates it to be 8.0 M_{w}.

== Impact ==
There were 30,000 fatalities, many injured and missing. At Tianshui, nearly all the city walls and government official structures were demolished. Over 3,600 homes collapsed, along with many loess cave dwellings and stockades. Significant religious places such as temples were destroyed. Many landslides occurred on the nearby mountains. Two landslides reportedly buried a town. It is estimated that more than 7,400 people were killed in the city. In Gangu County, at least 3,000 people died due to collapsing homes, landslides or ground fissures. At Wushan, many villages and fortifications were destroyed. In nearby Fufeng County, Shaanxi, residents and animals died in the collapse of walls, temples and the Jinfu Palace. Damage to city walls were reported in Hanzhong.

== See also ==
- List of earthquakes in China
