= Longxi County =

Longxi County 陇西县
- County
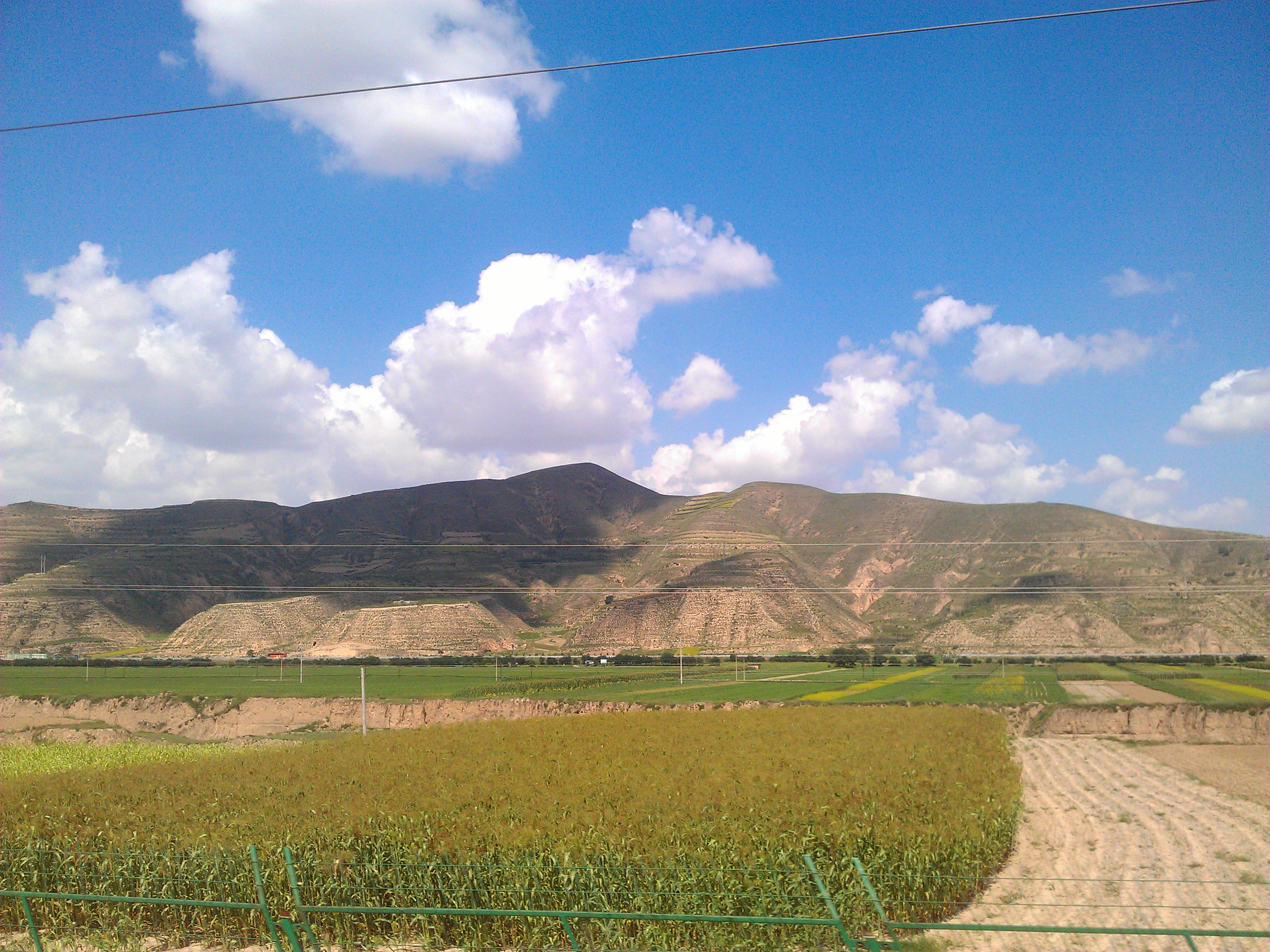

- Location of the seat in Gansu
- Coordinates: 35°05′N 104°39′E
- Country: China
- Province: Gansu
- Prefecture-level city: Dingxi
- County seat: Gongchang

Area
  - Total: 2,408 km^{2} (930 sq mi)

Population (2016)
  - Total: 522,500
  - Density: 217.0/km^{2} (562.0/sq mi)
- Time zone: UTC+8 (China Standard)
- Postal code: 748100
- Area code: 0932
- Website: www.cnlongxi.gov.cn

Longxi County
- Traditional Chinese: 隴西縣
- Simplified Chinese: 陇西县
Transcriptions
Standard Mandarin
- Hanyu Pinyin: Lǒngxī Xiàn
- Wade–Giles: Lung-hsi hsien

Longxi is a county under the administration of the prefecture-level city of Dingxi in the southeast of Gansu Province, China. Referred to in ancient times as Longxi Commandery, it is notably the origin of the Longxi Li lineage, from which the Tang dynasty's ruling House of Li descends.

== Administration ==
Longxi has twelve towns and five townships. The county seat is Gongchang.

Towns

- Gongchang (巩昌镇)
- Wenfeng (文峰镇)
- Shouyang (首阳镇)
- Caizi (菜子镇)
- Fuxing (福星镇)
- Tong'anyi (通安驿镇)
- Yuntian (云田镇)
- Biyan (碧岩镇)
- Mahe (马河镇)

Towns upgraded to townships

- Kezhai (柯寨镇)
- Shuangquan (双泉镇)
- Quanjiawan (权家湾镇)

Townships

- Weiyang (渭阳乡)
- Hongwei (宏伟乡)
- Heping (和平乡)
- Dexing (德兴乡)
- Yongji (永吉乡)

== Climate ==
Climate data for Longxi, elevation 1,728 m (5,669 ft), (1991–2020 normals, extremes 1981–2010)
Month	Jan	Feb	Mar	Apr	May	Jun	Jul	Aug	Sep	Oct	Nov	Dec	Year
Record high °C (°F)	12.2 (54.0)	17.8 (64.0)	26.2 (79.2)	30.5 (86.9)	31.2 (88.2)	34.7 (94.5)	35.8 (96.4)	34.8 (94.6)	33.2 (91.8)	25.8 (78.4)	18.9 (66.0)	15.5 (59.9)	35.8 (96.4)
Mean daily maximum °C (°F)	1.7 (35.1)	5.5 (41.9)	11.4 (52.5)	17.8 (64.0)	21.5 (70.7)	25.0 (77.0)	27.1 (80.8)	25.9 (78.6)	20.6 (69.1)	14.7 (58.5)	8.9 (48.0)	3.5 (38.3)	15.3 (59.5)
Daily mean °C (°F)	−5.2 (22.6)	−1.1 (30.0)	4.6 (40.3)	10.6 (51.1)	14.7 (58.5)	18.4 (65.1)	20.6 (69.1)	19.5 (67.1)	14.7 (58.5)	8.8 (47.8)	2.2 (36.0)	−3.7 (25.3)	8.7 (47.6)
Mean daily minimum °C (°F)	−10.2 (13.6)	−5.9 (21.4)	−0.6 (30.9)	4.4 (39.9)	8.5 (47.3)	12.4 (54.3)	14.9 (58.8)	14.3 (57.7)	10.3 (50.5)	4.5 (40.1)	−2.3 (27.9)	−8.6 (16.5)	3.5 (38.2)
Record low °C (°F)	−22.0 (−7.6)	−19.5 (−3.1)	−12.0 (10.4)	−5.6 (21.9)	−2.4 (27.7)	3.7 (38.7)	6.0 (42.8)	6.2 (43.2)	0.9 (33.6)	−8.0 (17.6)	−16.8 (1.8)	−23.4 (−10.1)	−23.4 (−10.1)
Average precipitation mm (inches)	4.0 (0.16)	5.7 (0.22)	13.2 (0.52)	26.4 (1.04)	54.2 (2.13)	59.7 (2.35)	75.2 (2.96)	81.3 (3.20)	53.3 (2.10)	34.0 (1.34)	6.1 (0.24)	1.6 (0.06)	414.7 (16.32)
Average precipitation days (≥ 0.1 mm)	4.5	4.5	6.0	7.8	11.0	10.9	11.9	11.7	12.7	9.1	3.9	1.8	95.8
Average snowy days	7.1	6.5	5.2	1.4	0	0	0	0	0	0.9	3.6	4.0	28.7
Average relative humidity (%)	62	61	58	55	59	64	67	71	76	76	71	63	65
Mean monthly sunshine hours	171.8	162.4	187.9	208.0	215.4	205.8	215.3	205.4	141.1	138.6	157.9	179.5	2,189.1
Percentage possible sunshine	55	52	50	53	50	48	49	50	38	40	52	59	50
Source: China Meteorological Administration

== Economy ==
The Longxi economy is mainly based on agriculture, cultivation of ingredients used in Traditional Chinese medicine, and production of aluminium. Astragalus and Codonopsis, among other medicinal plants, are grown and processed for traditional medicine in the Longxi region. In 2021, the Longxi High-Tech Zone was established as an industrial base for developing Traditional Chinese medicine, which became the third industrial base in Gansu Province dedicated to Traditional Chinese medicine.

== Tourism ==
- Renshou Mountain Forest Park (仁寿山森林公园)
- Lijia Long palace (李家龙宫)
- Baochang building (保昌楼)
- Wenfeng tower (文峰塔)
- Wenfeng herbal medicine market (文峰药材市场)
