= Min County =

Min County 岷县
- County
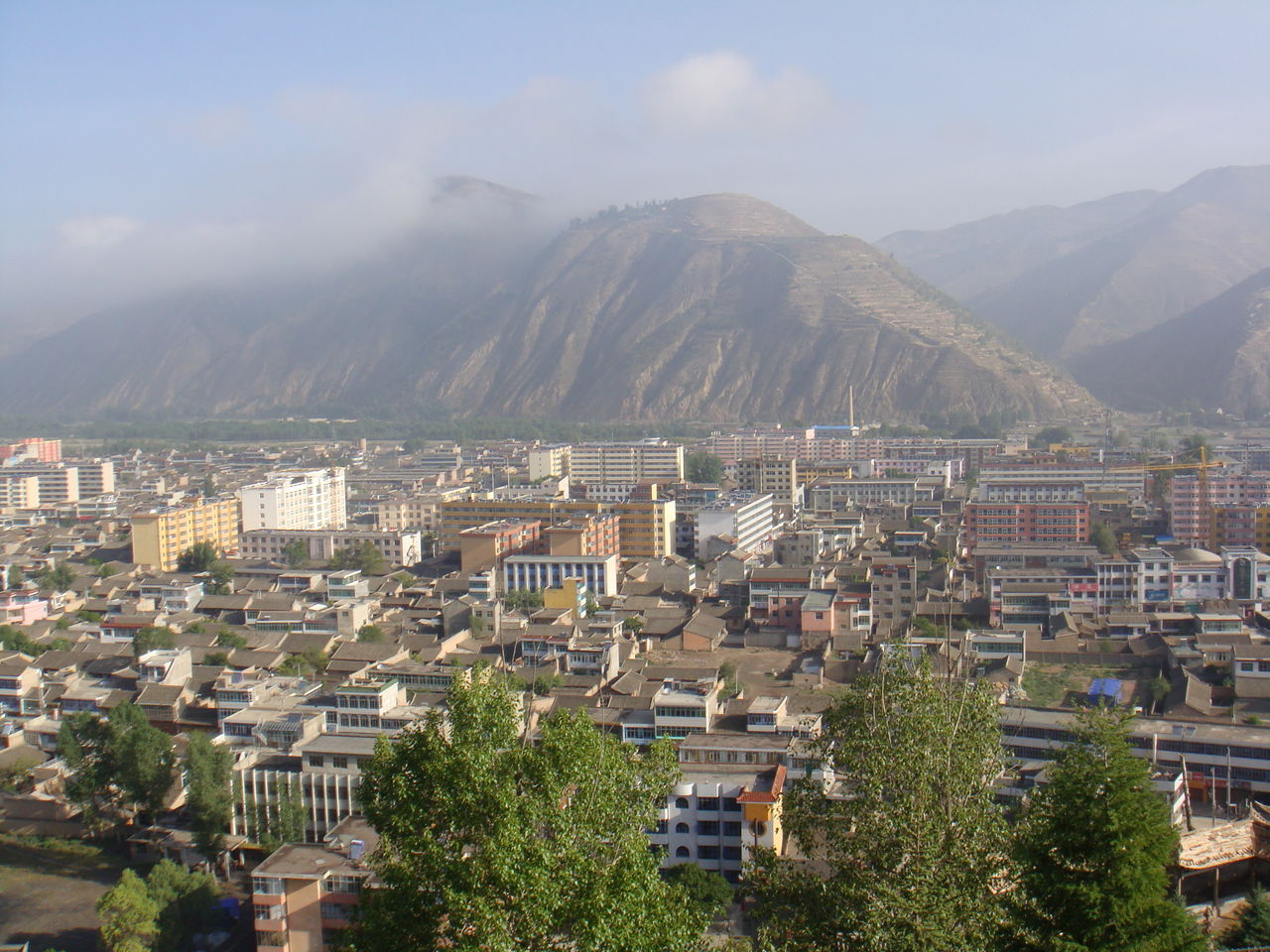
- Minyang town, the county seat of Minxian

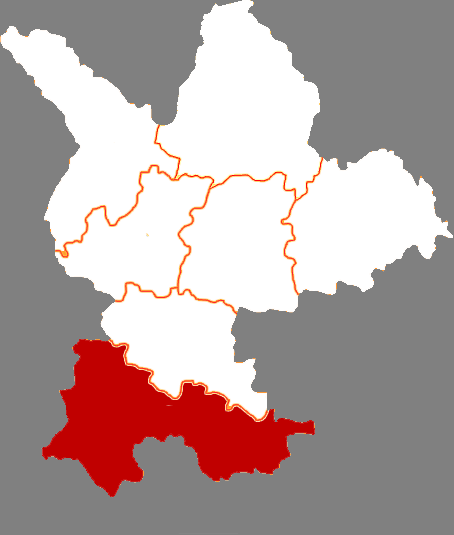
- Min County in Dingxi

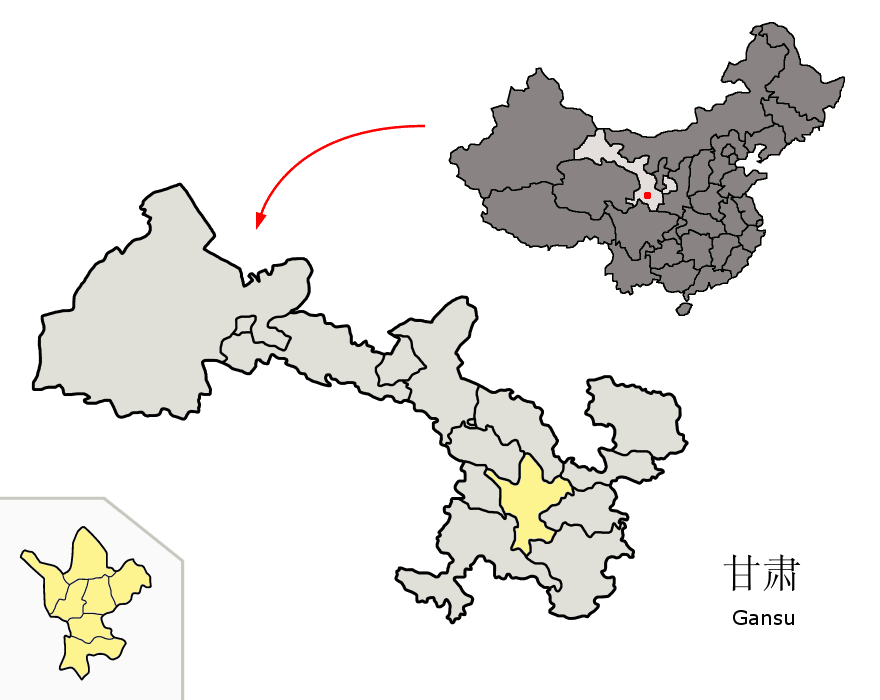
- Dingxi in Gansu
- Coordinates: 34°26′14″N 104°1′49″E
- Country: China
- Province: Gansu
- Prefecture-level city: Dingxi
- County seat: Minyang

Area
  - County: 3,578 km^{2} (1,381 sq mi)

Population (31-12-2019)
  - County: 462,800
  - Density: 129.3/km^{2} (335.0/sq mi)
  - Urban: 124,300
  - Rural: 338,500
- Time zone: UTC+8 (China Standard)
- Postal code: 748400
- Website: http://minxian.gov.cn/

Min County
- Traditional Chinese: 岷縣
- Simplified Chinese: 岷县
Transcriptions
Standard Mandarin
- Hanyu Pinyin: Mín Xiàn

Min County or Minxian is administratively under the control of the prefecture-level city of Dingxi, in the south of Gansu province, China. In ancient times, it was known as Lintao County due to its location along the Tao River. It was founded as Minzhou (岷州) in 544, named after the Min Mountains in the south of the county. The county received its present name in 1913. In 1985, it became subordinate to Dingxi. Min county is well-known for Angelica sinensis (Chinese: 当归; pinyin: dāngguī), which is a Chinese traditional medicine.

== Administrative divisions ==
Min County is divided to 15 towns and 3 townships.

*County government seat

Towns

- Minyang (岷阳镇)*
- Buma (蒲麻镇)
- Xizhai (西寨镇)
- Meichuan (梅川镇)
- Xijiang (西江镇)
- Lujing (闾井镇)
- Shili (十里镇)
- Chabu (茶埠镇)
- Zhongzhai (中寨镇)
- Qingshui (清水镇)
- Sigou (寺沟镇)
- Mazichuan (麻子川镇)
- Weixin (维新镇)
- Hetuo (禾驮镇)
- Mawu (马坞镇)

Townships

- Qinxu Township (秦许乡)
- Shendu Township (申都乡)
- Suolong Township (锁龙乡)

== Climate ==
Climate data for Minxian, elevation 2,315 m (7,595 ft), (1991–2020 normals, extremes 1981–2010)
Month	Jan	Feb	Mar	Apr	May	Jun	Jul	Aug	Sep	Oct	Nov	Dec	Year
Record high °C (°F)	18.3 (64.9)	21.8 (71.2)	27.1 (80.8)	30.0 (86.0)	29.3 (84.7)	29.9 (85.8)	33.3 (91.9)	30.5 (86.9)	29.9 (85.8)	23.9 (75.0)	20.2 (68.4)	15.3 (59.5)	33.3 (91.9)
Mean daily maximum °C (°F)	3.0 (37.4)	5.8 (42.4)	10.2 (50.4)	15.3 (59.5)	18.6 (65.5)	21.3 (70.3)	23.6 (74.5)	23.1 (73.6)	18.7 (65.7)	13.6 (56.5)	9.2 (48.6)	4.5 (40.1)	13.9 (57.0)
Daily mean °C (°F)	−5.7 (21.7)	−2.1 (28.2)	2.7 (36.9)	7.7 (45.9)	11.5 (52.7)	14.8 (58.6)	16.9 (62.4)	16.3 (61.3)	12.5 (54.5)	7.2 (45.0)	1.4 (34.5)	−4.4 (24.1)	6.6 (43.8)
Mean daily minimum °C (°F)	−11.7 (10.9)	−7.5 (18.5)	−2.6 (27.3)	1.8 (35.2)	5.7 (42.3)	9.3 (48.7)	11.6 (52.9)	11.3 (52.3)	8.2 (46.8)	3.0 (37.4)	−3.6 (25.5)	−10 (14)	1.3 (34.3)
Record low °C (°F)	−24.1 (−11.4)	−22.8 (−9.0)	−17.4 (0.7)	−9.0 (15.8)	−4.3 (24.3)	1.1 (34.0)	1.8 (35.2)	2.1 (35.8)	−1.9 (28.6)	−8.2 (17.2)	−16.9 (1.6)	−21.5 (−6.7)	−24.1 (−11.4)
Average precipitation mm (inches)	3.9 (0.15)	5.1 (0.20)	16.2 (0.64)	40.7 (1.60)	80.5 (3.17)	86.4 (3.40)	105.4 (4.15)	101.8 (4.01)	75.9 (2.99)	46.5 (1.83)	7.3 (0.29)	1.5 (0.06)	571.2 (22.49)
Average precipitation days (≥ 0.1 mm)	4.6	5.2	8.8	11.9	15.9	15.9	14.9	14.6	15.2	13.3	4.3	2.0	126.6
Average snowy days	8.1	9.4	10.1	4.7	0.8	0	0	0	0	2.5	5.1	5.3	46
Average relative humidity (%)	57	58	61	61	64	70	74	74	76	74	67	59	66
Mean monthly sunshine hours	184.2	166.1	180.2	190.8	201.4	187.1	199.2	193.8	139.4	146.5	179.3	192.7	2,160.7
Percentage possible sunshine	58	53	48	48	46	43	46	47	38	42	58	63	49
Source: China Meteorological Administration

== Transport ==
- China National Highway 212
- G75 Lanzhou–Haikou Expressway (under construction)
