= Lintao County =

Lintao County 临洮县
- County
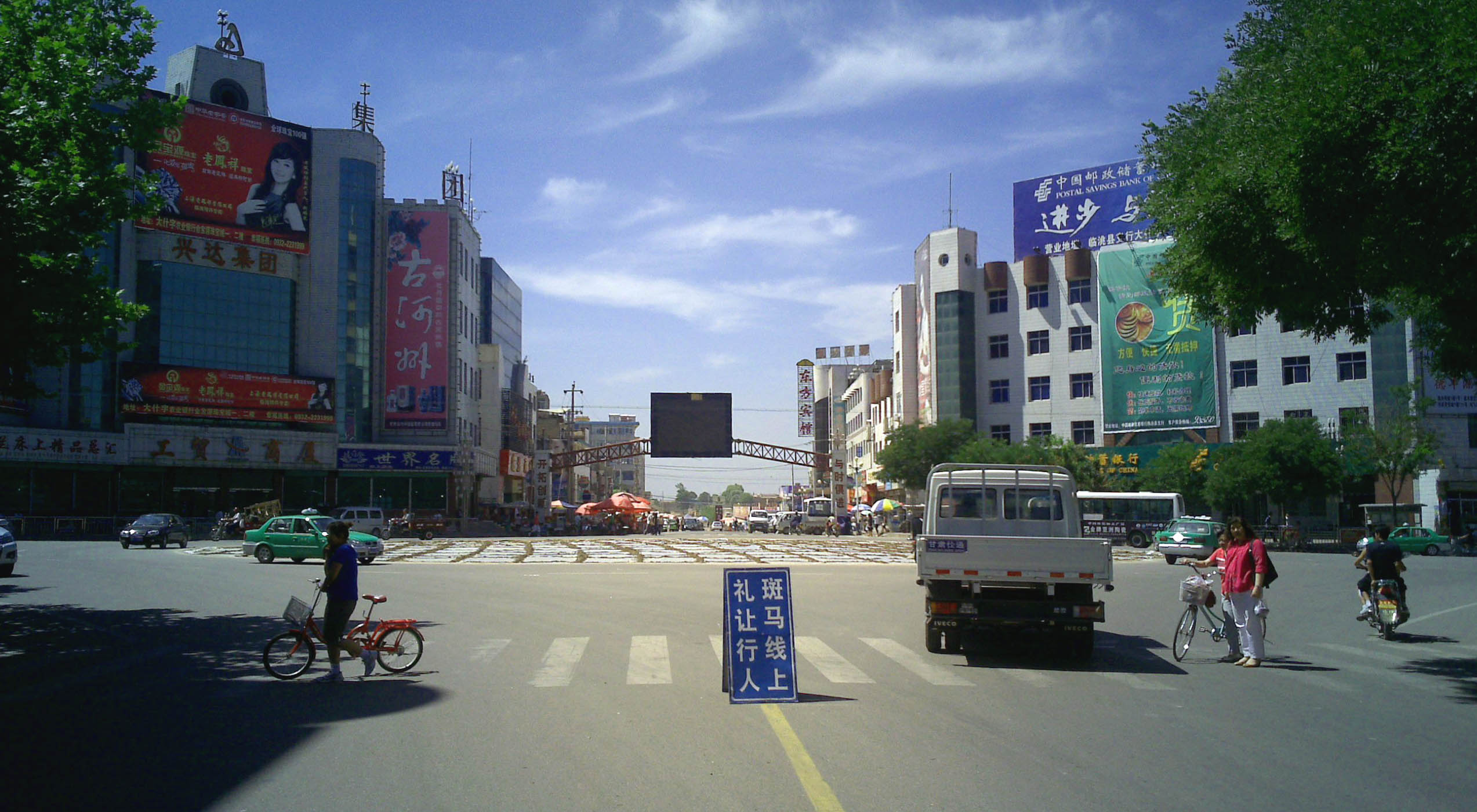

- Location of the seat in Gansu Lintao (China) Lintao (Continental Asia)
- Coordinates: 35°22′45.92″N 103°51′23.04″E
- Country: China
- Province: Gansu
- Prefecture-level city: Dingxi
- County seat: Taoyang

Area
  - County: 2,851 km^{2} (1,101 sq mi)

Population (2019)
  - County: 554,900
  - Density: 194.6/km^{2} (504.1/sq mi)
  - Urban: 191,100
- Time zone: UTC+8 (China Standard)
- Postal code: 730500
- Website: www.lintao.gov.cn

Lintao County (simplified Chinese: 临洮县; traditional Chinese: 臨洮縣; pinyin: Líntáo Xiàn) is administratively under the control of Dingxi, Gansu province, China. In ancient times, Lintao was centered on present day Min County.

== History ==
Pottery from the Majiayao culture (3300 to 2000 BC) has been found in Lintao.

Until the 20th century, Lintao was known as Didao (狄道). The Battle of Didao was fought in the area in 255 CE, during the Three Kingdoms era.

In the 8th century, an anonymous poet of the Tang dynasty places General Geshu Han and the Chinese army in Lintao, battling the Tibetans. Poet Li Bai references Lintao in his poem, "Ballads of Four Seasons: Winter."

Located at an important Tao River crossing, Didao City (i.e., today's Taoyang Town) was an important trade center during the Northern Song dynasty (ca. 11–12th century), when the more northern route of the Silk Route was blocked by the Xi Xia state. It is known to have been home to hundreds of foreign merchants at the time, some of whom may have been the ancestors of today's Hui people of Gansu.

== Geography ==
The county is located mostly on the right (eastern) bank of the Tao River, a right tributary of the Yellow River. It borders with Lanzhou, capital of Gansu, in the northeast, with Linxia Hui Autonomous Prefecture in the west, and with other parts of Dingxi Prefecture-level City in the east and south.

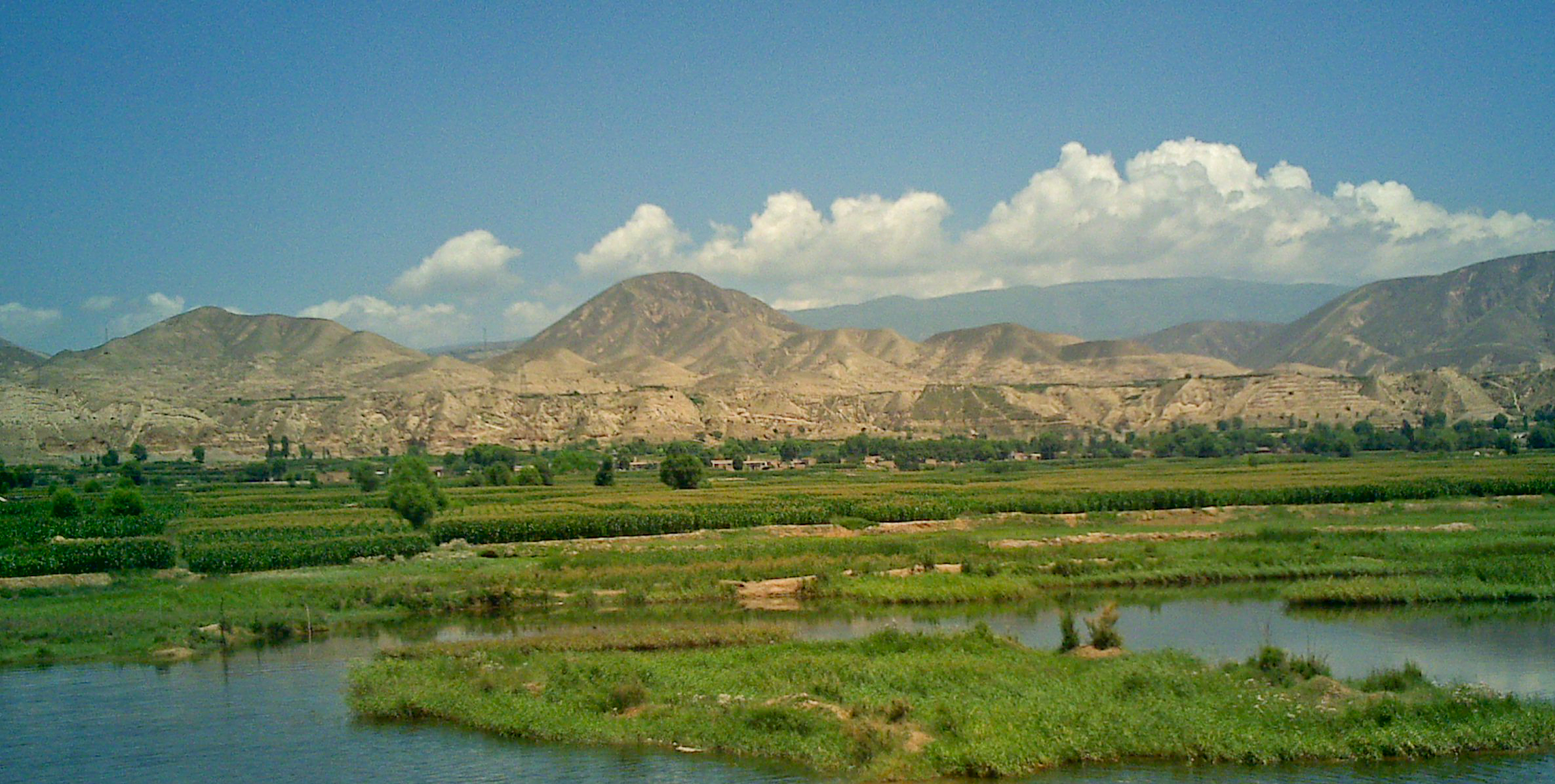
Lintao county area

== Climate ==
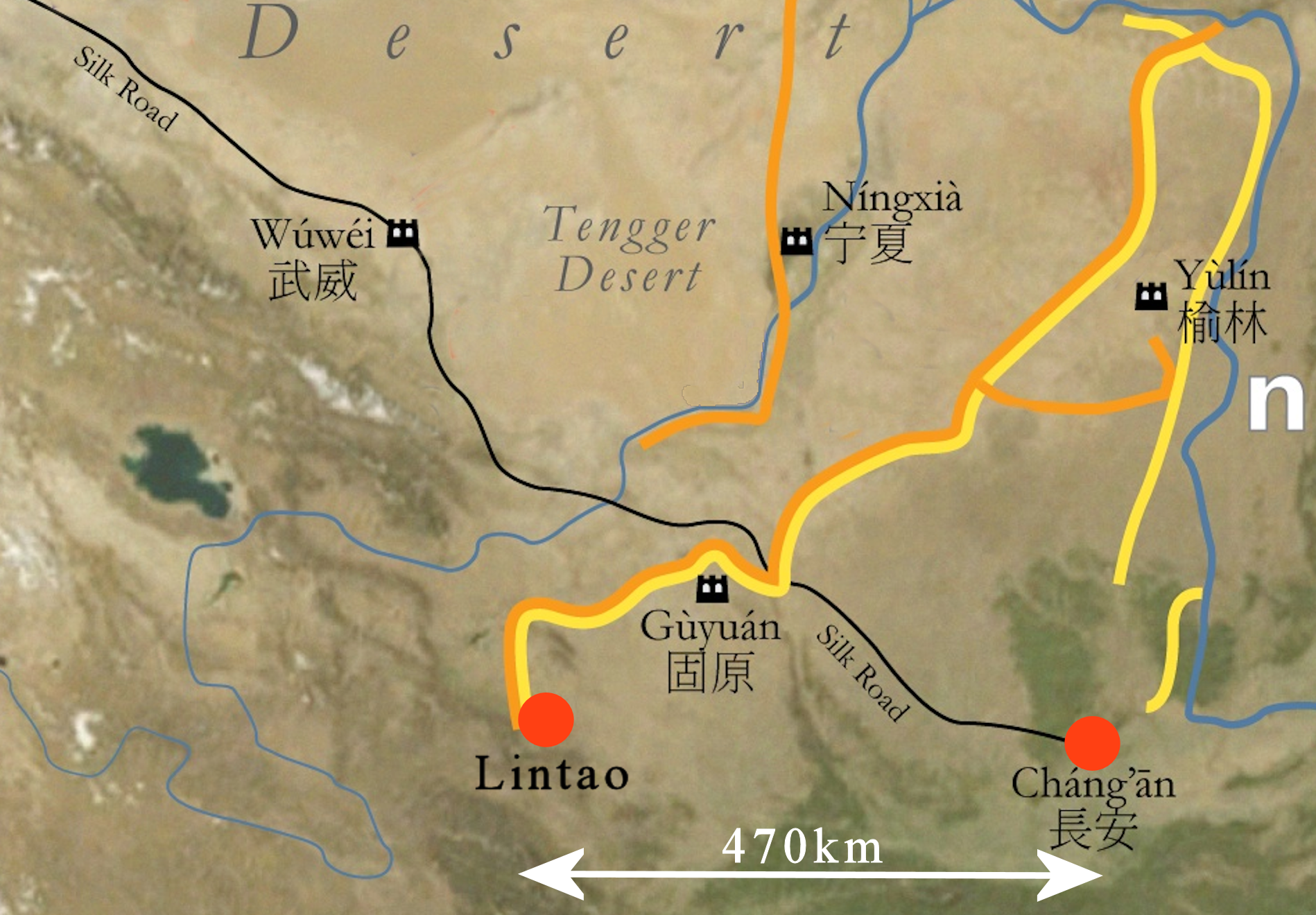
Lintao is about 470km from the capital (Chang'an), at the starting point of the Great Wall of China.

Climate data for Lintao, elevation 1,894 m (6,214 ft), (1991–2020 normals, extremes 1981–present)
Month	Jan	Feb	Mar	Apr	May	Jun	Jul	Aug	Sep	Oct	Nov	Dec	Year
Record high °C (°F)	13.4 (56.1)	21.0 (69.8)	27.9 (82.2)	30.9 (87.6)	32.8 (91.0)	32.1 (89.8)	36.1 (97.0)	34.4 (93.9)	34.0 (93.2)	25.2 (77.4)	19.7 (67.5)	11.7 (53.1)	36.1 (97.0)
Mean daily maximum °C (°F)	1.6 (34.9)	6.1 (43.0)	11.9 (53.4)	18.0 (64.4)	21.6 (70.9)	24.6 (76.3)	26.6 (79.9)	25.7 (78.3)	20.9 (69.6)	15.3 (59.5)	9.0 (48.2)	3.1 (37.6)	15.4 (59.7)
Daily mean °C (°F)	−6.4 (20.5)	−1.8 (28.8)	4.0 (39.2)	9.8 (49.6)	13.7 (56.7)	17.1 (62.8)	19.1 (66.4)	18.4 (65.1)	13.9 (57.0)	8.0 (46.4)	1.2 (34.2)	−4.9 (23.2)	7.7 (45.8)
Mean daily minimum °C (°F)	−12.2 (10.0)	−7.5 (18.5)	−1.9 (28.6)	2.9 (37.2)	6.9 (44.4)	10.6 (51.1)	13.0 (55.4)	12.7 (54.9)	8.9 (48.0)	3.0 (37.4)	−3.7 (25.3)	−10.2 (13.6)	1.9 (35.4)
Record low °C (°F)	−25.6 (−14.1)	−21.9 (−7.4)	−13.4 (7.9)	−6.8 (19.8)	−2.6 (27.3)	2.5 (36.5)	4.3 (39.7)	4.7 (40.5)	−0.1 (31.8)	−8.2 (17.2)	−15.2 (4.6)	−27.9 (−18.2)	−27.9 (−18.2)
Average precipitation mm (inches)	3.7 (0.15)	5.0 (0.20)	13.2 (0.52)	33.4 (1.31)	64.4 (2.54)	71.2 (2.80)	101.3 (3.99)	93.4 (3.68)	64.1 (2.52)	36.4 (1.43)	6.9 (0.27)	2.1 (0.08)	495.1 (19.49)
Average precipitation days (≥ 0.1 mm)	3.9	4.0	6.4	8.4	11.5	12.8	13.8	12.8	12.8	9.5	3.6	2.3	101.8
Average snowy days	6.5	6.1	6.0	2.2	0.2	0	0	0	0	1.4	3.9	4.2	30.5
Average relative humidity (%)	62	60	58	57	63	69	73	75	78	76	72	66	67
Mean monthly sunshine hours	198.6	193.7	217.5	228.5	236.7	225.6	239.0	225.2	168.1	176.4	190.7	201.8	2,501.8
Percentage possible sunshine	63	62	58	58	54	52	54	55	46	51	62	67	57
Source: China Meteorological Administration

== Culture ==
Lintao is known for its Huasutang candy (花酥糖) and Nuo opera.

== Administrative divisions ==
Lintao County is divided to 12 towns and 6 townships. The county seat of Lintao County is in Taoyang town.

Towns

- Taoyang (洮阳镇)
- Balipu (八里铺镇)
- Xintian (新添镇)
- Xindian (辛店镇)
- Taishi (太石镇)
- Zhongpu (中铺镇)
- Xiakou (峡口镇)
- Longmen (龙门镇)
- Yaodian (窑店镇)
- Yujing (玉井镇)
- Yaxiaji (衙下集镇)
- Nanping (南屏镇)

Townships

- Hongqi Township (红旗乡)
- Shangying Township (上营乡)
- Kangjiaji Township (康家集乡)
- Zhantan Township (站滩乡)
- Manwa Township (漫洼乡)
- Lian'erwan Township (连儿湾乡)

== Transport ==
China National Highway 212 and the Lanhai Expressway (G75) cross the county from the north to the south, on its way from Lanzhou to south-eastern Gansu.

A military airfield, Lintao Air Base, is located south of the county seat.
