= Dingxi =

Dingxi 定西市
- Prefecture-level city
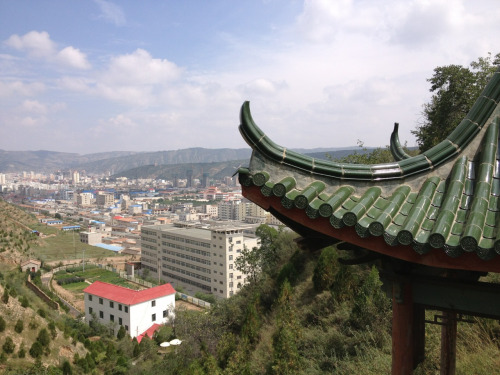
- Dingxi urban area (Anding District)

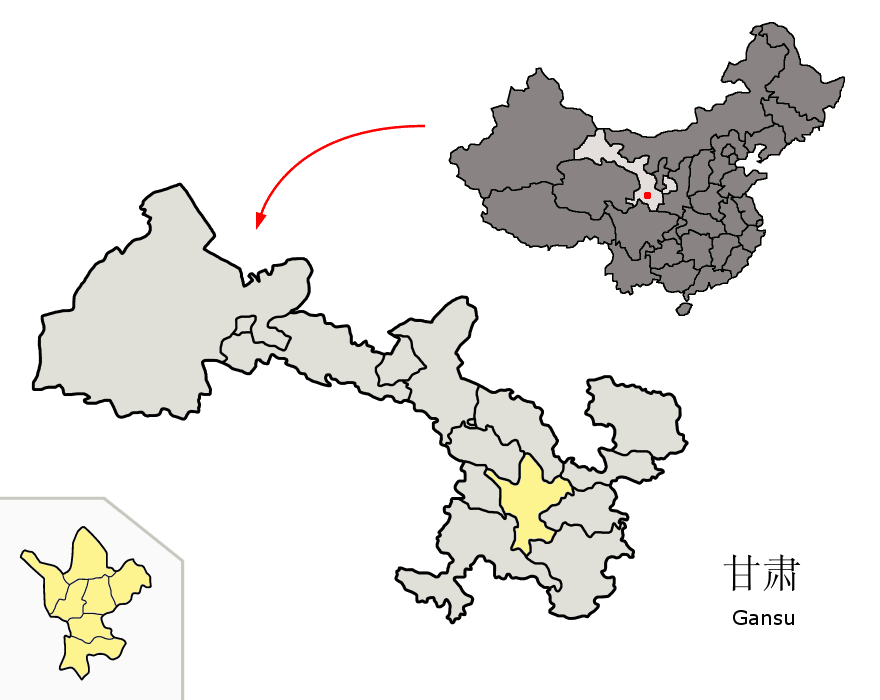
- Location of Dingxi City jurisdiction in Gansu

- Location of the city center in Gansu
- Coordinates (Dingxi municipal government): 35°36′29″N 104°35′31″E
- Country: People's Republic of China
- Province: Gansu
- Municipal seat: Anding District

Area
  - Prefecture-level city: 19,609.24 km^{2} (7,571.17 sq mi)
  - Urban: 4,225 km^{2} (1,631 sq mi)
  - Metro: 4,225 km^{2} (1,631 sq mi)

Population (2020 census)
  - Prefecture-level city: 2,524,097
  - Density: 128.7198/km^{2} (333.3827/sq mi)
  - Urban: 422,383
  - Urban density: 99.97/km^{2} (258.9/sq mi)
  - Metro: 422,383
  - Metro density: 99.97/km^{2} (258.9/sq mi)

GDP
  - Prefecture-level city: CN¥ 30.5 billion US$ 4.9 billion
  - Per capita: CN¥ 10,987; US$ 1,764
- Time zone: UTC+8 (China Standard)
- ISO 3166 code: CN-GS-11

Dingxi (Chinese: 定西; pinyin: Dìngxī), also known as Longyou (Chinese: 陇右; pinyin: Lǒngyòu) is a prefecture-level city in the southeast of Gansu province, People's Republic of China. As of the 2020 census, its population was 2,524,097 inhabitants, of which 422,383 lived in the built-up (or metro) area made of Anding urban district.

== History ==
Dingxi was important in the development of some of China's earliest cultures, specifically along the Wei River, one of the Yellow River's biggest tributaries. Numerous Neolithic sites from various cultures are found throughout the area.

A series of earthquakes in July 2013 killed at least 95 people and destroyed 120,000 homes.

== Geography ==
Dingxi City is located in central Gansu province, 98 km (61 mi) east of Lanzhou, giving it the nickname the "eastern gateway". The Wei River, a tributary of the Yellow River flows through the district and provides it with the majority of its water. Dingxi is semi-arid, with little precipitation. Even though sunlight here can be intense, temperatures are generally cool. The surrounding terrain is mostly loess hills and ravines in the north and highlands in the south. The area is 20,300 km^{2} (7,800 sq mi).

After the Qianlong Emperor period (18th century), the land of Dingxi went from lush grasslands and forests to being severely deforested as a result of war, famines and overpopulation.

== Climate ==
Dingxi has a monsoon- influenced cool semi-arid climate (Köppen BSk) characterised like most of eastern Gansu by warm to very warm, humid summers and freezing, virtually snowless winters.

Climate data for Dingxi (Anding District), elevation 1,897 m (6,224 ft), (1991–2020 normals, extremes 1981–2010)
Month	Jan	Feb	Mar	Apr	May	Jun	Jul	Aug	Sep	Oct	Nov	Dec	Year
Record high °C (°F)	14.6 (58.3)	20.3 (68.5)	26.7 (80.1)	29.6 (85.3)	31.2 (88.2)	32.0 (89.6)	35.1 (95.2)	34.2 (93.6)	31.0 (87.8)	24.9 (76.8)	20.9 (69.6)	15.4 (59.7)	35.1 (95.2)
Mean daily maximum °C (°F)	1.4 (34.5)	4.8 (40.6)	10.3 (50.5)	16.8 (62.2)	21.0 (69.8)	24.4 (75.9)	26.4 (79.5)	25.1 (77.2)	20.1 (68.2)	14.3 (57.7)	8.8 (47.8)	3.4 (38.1)	14.7 (58.5)
Daily mean °C (°F)	−6.5 (20.3)	−2.2 (28.0)	3.3 (37.9)	9.5 (49.1)	14.0 (57.2)	17.8 (64.0)	19.8 (67.6)	18.8 (65.8)	14.1 (57.4)	8.1 (46.6)	1.4 (34.5)	−4.6 (23.7)	7.8 (46.0)
Mean daily minimum °C (°F)	−12.3 (9.9)	−7.6 (18.3)	−2.0 (28.4)	3.4 (38.1)	7.8 (46.0)	11.9 (53.4)	14.4 (57.9)	13.7 (56.7)	9.5 (49.1)	3.5 (38.3)	−3.7 (25.3)	−10.1 (13.8)	2.4 (36.3)
Record low °C (°F)	−25.5 (−13.9)	−22.1 (−7.8)	−14.8 (5.4)	−8.0 (17.6)	−2.8 (27.0)	2.6 (36.7)	4.3 (39.7)	5.0 (41.0)	−1.3 (29.7)	−10.4 (13.3)	−18.1 (−0.6)	−29.7 (−21.5)	−29.7 (−21.5)
Average precipitation mm (inches)	3.4 (0.13)	4.6 (0.18)	10.5 (0.41)	23.5 (0.93)	46.9 (1.85)	53.3 (2.10)	69.7 (2.74)	79.9 (3.15)	47.6 (1.87)	29.6 (1.17)	4.7 (0.19)	1.4 (0.06)	375.1 (14.78)
Average snowy days	8.2	8.3	7.4	2.5	0.3	0	0	0	0	2	4.9	4.8	38.4
Average relative humidity (%)	59	58	54	51	54	60	65	68	72	71	64	58	61
Mean monthly sunshine hours	197.9	184.6	209.1	229	243	235.2	236.7	218.8	165.2	171.6	189	207.7	2,487.8
Percentage possible sunshine	63	59	56	58	56	54	54	53	45	50	62	69	57
Source: China Meteorological Administration

== Administration ==
Dingxi has 1 urban district, 6 counties, and 119 towns with a total population of 2,698,622.

Map
Name	Simplified Chinese	Hanyu Pinyin	Population (2010 census)	Area (km^{2})	Density (/km^{2})
City proper
Anding District	安定区	Āndìng Qū	420,614	4,225	99.55
Rural
Tongwei County	通渭县	Tōngwèi Xiàn	349,539	2,899	120.57
Longxi County	陇西县	Lǒngxī Xiàn	453,259	2,657	170.59
Weiyuan County	渭源县	Wèiyuán Xiàn	324,215	2,034	159.40
Lintao County	临洮县	Líntáo Xiàn	507,386	2,851	177.97
Zhang County	漳县	Zhāng Xiàn	192,957	2,164	89.17
Min County	岷县	Mín Xiàn	450,654	3,500	128.76

== Economy ==
Dingxi has been one of the most poverty-stricken regions in Gansu province and China as a whole. Up to 1999, some citizens still lacked food and clothing. Although most of Gansu is arid, in other regions of the province a large portion of farmland is irrigated, whereas in Dingxi this was not the case. Especially after the 1960s, the agricultural output of Dingxi plummeted due to land degradation.

Agriculture and natural resource based industries are the key to Dingxi's economy. There are more than 300 different kinds of Chinese medicinal plants and herbs found in the area. Dingxi's Anding County is China's number one grower of yams. Zanthoxylum (also called Sichuan Pepper or prickly ash fruit), walnuts, wild apricots, and other fruit are some of Dingxi's famous dried exports. Potato is an important crop, and Dingxi has been described as the 'Potato Capital of China'.

== Culture ==
The local Dingxi dialect of Central Plains Mandarin has only three tones instead of the normal four.

=== Food ===
- Shouzhuarou, cooked mutton on the bone
- Dingxi Niangpi, a type of noodle similar to Liangpi
- Longxi Qianrou, a dish made from donkey tail
- Minxian Fenyu, a type of noodle that looks like a small fish or tadpole

== Transportation ==
- G22 Qingdao–Lanzhou Expressway
- G30 Lianyungang–Khorgas Expressway
- China National Highway 312
- Longhai railway
- Xuzhou-Lanzhou High-Speed Railway

== See also ==
- Xihaigu, region in Ningxia with similar landscape and economic issues
