= Liujiaxia Reservoir =

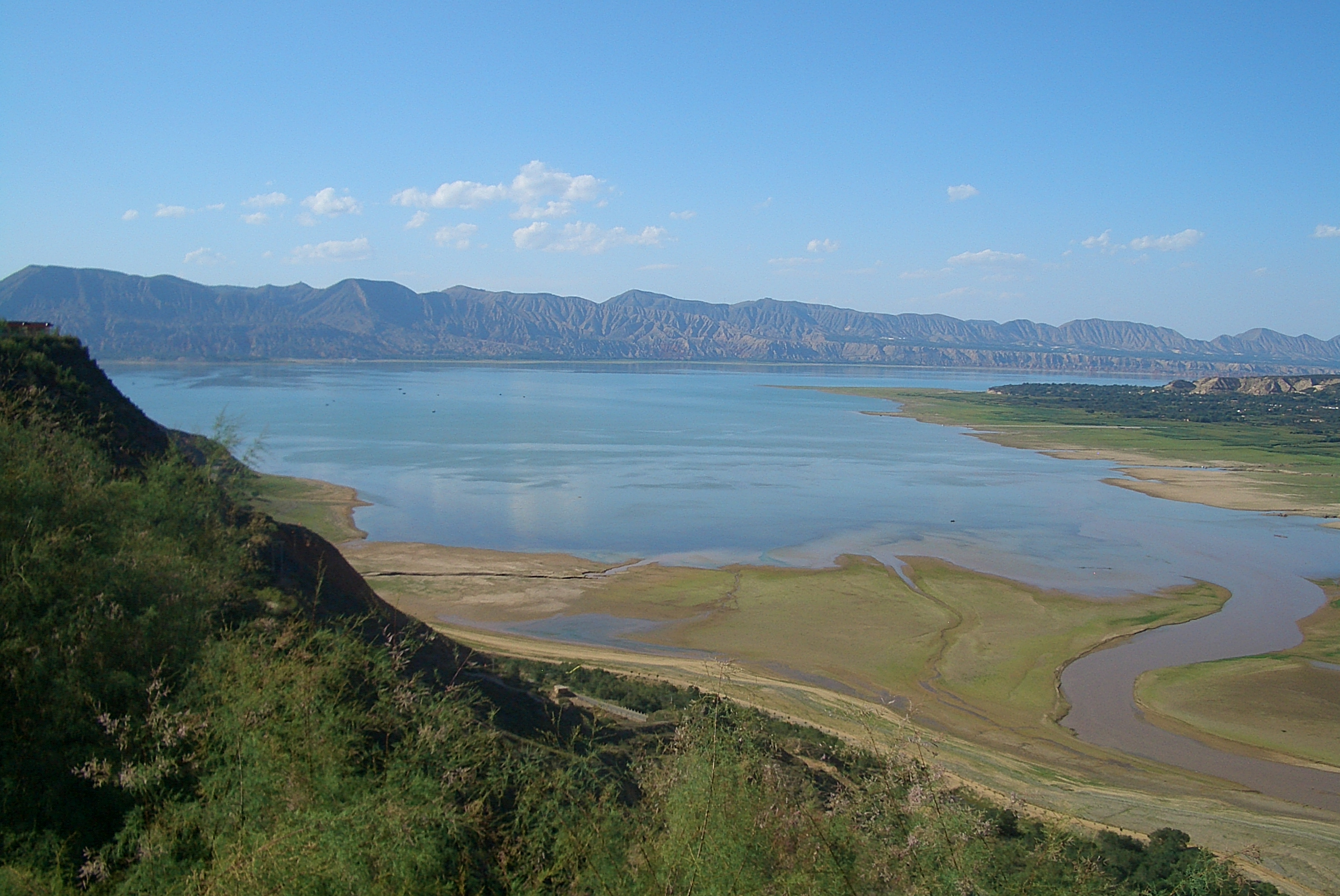
- The Daxia River flowing into the reservoir.

- Location within Gansu
- Coordinates: 35°55′55″N 103°20′45″E
- Type: Reservoir
- Basin countries: China
- Built: 1969
- Surface area: 130 km^{2} (50 mi^{2})
- Water volume: 4.24 km^{3} (1 mi^{3})
- Surface elevation: 1,735 m (5,692 ft)

The Liujiaxia Reservoir (simplified Chinese: 刘家峡水库; traditional Chinese: 劉家峽水庫; pinyin: Liújiāxiá Shuǐkù) is a reservoir in China's Gansu Province, formed by the Liujiaxia Dam on the Yellow River. It occupies over 130 km^{2} (50 mi^{2}), and is located entirely within Linxia Hui Autonomous Prefecture. The reservoir's shores belong to the prefecture's Yongjing County (the narrow northern part, and the north shore of the wide southern part), Dongxiang Autonomous County (eastern part of the south shore), Linxia County (western part of the south shore), and Jishishan Bonan, Dongxiang and Salar Autonomous County (the small westernmost section of the south shore).

The Daxia River and the Tao River flow into the reservoirs, forming wide bays.

The water level in Liujiaxia Reservoir is usually reported as 1,735 m (5,692 ft) above the sea level, but in practice it varies significantly, in accordance with the water flow and human needs.

The initial capacity of the reservoir was 5.7 km^{3} (1.4 mi^{3}), but after 10 years it lost 10% of its capacity due to silting, and after 17 years, 17.4%. This silting rate is considered quite low, compared to other reservoirs on the Yellow River, such as the narrow Yanguoxia Reservoir just downstream, which lost 71.3% of its storage capacity between 1958 and 1964 (and 77%, by 1965), or Sanmenxia Reservoir, which lost 96% of its storage capacity to sedimentation in just 4 years.

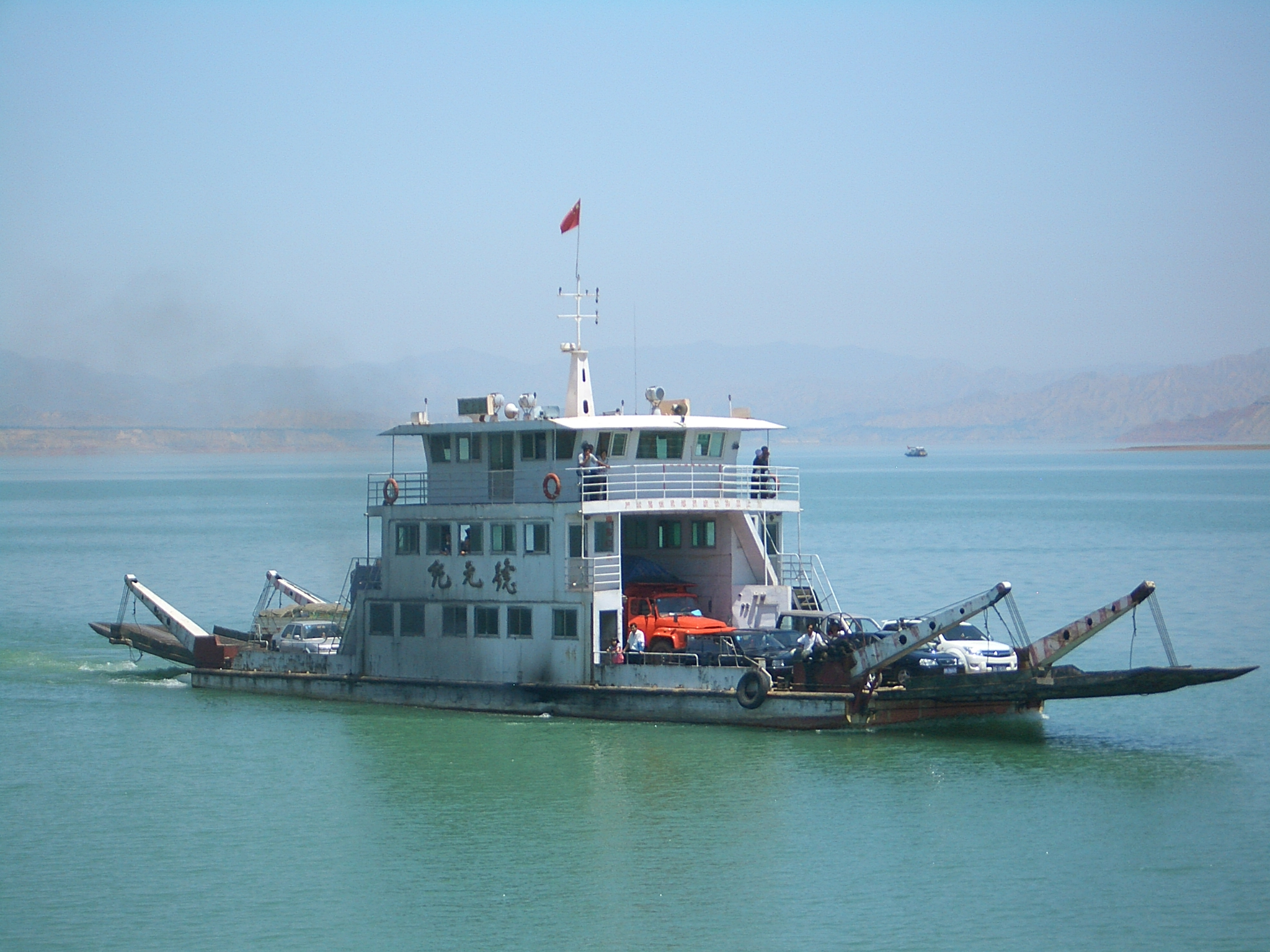
A ferry on the Liujiaxia Reservoir

The reservoir usually does not freeze over in winter, but during the unusually cold weather in early 2008 over half of its surface froze, which necessitated taking measures to protect the turbines of the hydroelectric plant from floating ice.

A variety of watercraft operate on the reservoir. Vehicle ferries run frequently across the reservoir between docks in Linxia County (Lianhua Tai) and Yongjing County. Recreational vessels and shuttle boats to Bingling Temple operate from a number of docks, in particular the one in Liujiaxia Town near the dam.

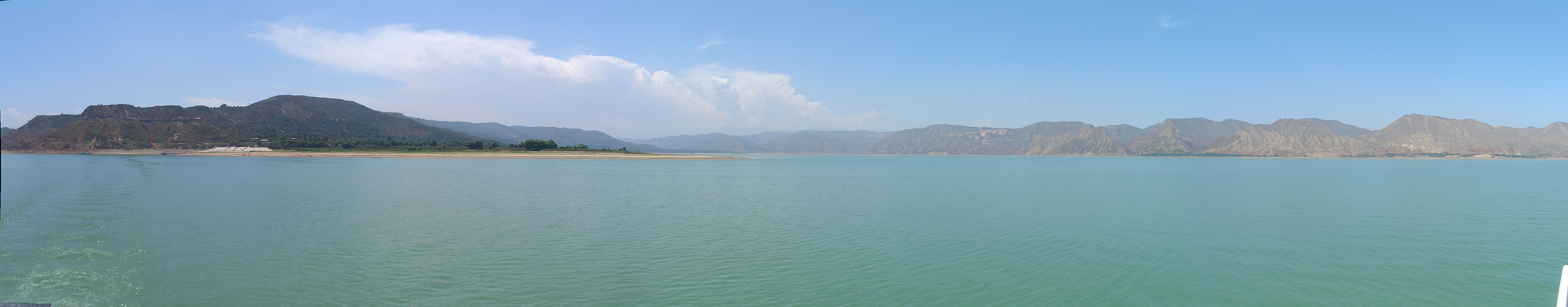
A panorama of Liujiaxia Reservoir. Looking upstream from a ferry crossing between Linxia County (Lianhua Tai ferry dock, seen on the left) and Yongjing County

== See also ==
- Liujiaxia Dam
