= Tao River =

Tributary of China's Yellow River

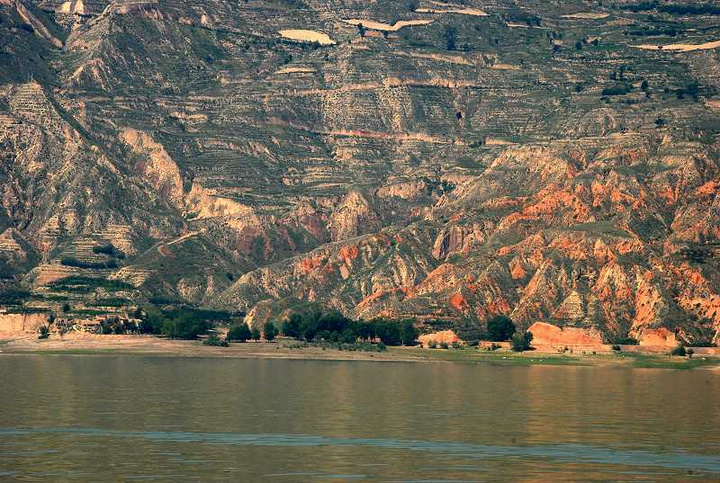
View of the Tao River

The Tao River is a tributary of the Yellow River, joining it on the right bank in the upper reaches.

Tao River, Taohe River (Chinese: 洮河; pinyin: Táo Hé) or Lu Chu (Tibetan: ཀླུ་ཆུ, Wylie: klu chu) is a right tributary of China's Yellow River. It starts in Xiqing Mountains (西倾山) near the Gansu–Qinghai border, flows eastward across Gannan Tibetan Autonomous Prefecture, and then northward more or less along the border between Dingxi Prefecture-level City in the east and Gannan and Linxia Prefectures in the west. It flows into the Yellow River (actually, the Liujiaxia Reservoir) near Liujiaxia Town (the county seat of Yongjing County), just upstream of Liujiaxia Dam.

== Hydro power ==
A number of dams with hydroelectric power plants have been constructed on the Tao River. According to Google Maps, they include dams at the following locations (upstream to downstream):

- 34°36′35″N 103°58′34″E—Gucheng Station, near Zhongzhai Town (中寨镇) in Min County
- 34°55′27″N 103°49′57″E—Shashuniu Dam (峡枢纽大坝)
- 34°58′51″N 103°49′52″E—the Lianlu Cascade I, near Xiacheng Township (峡城乡)
- 34°59′48″N 103°47′23″E
- 35°05′49″N 103°45′37″E
- 35°09′27″N 103°48′29″E

The Lianlu Cascade I station, with the generation capacity of 55 MW, has been jointly developed by Japan and China. Construction of the station's three 22MW units began in 2007 and was completed in 2010, the year the units began producing electricity.
