= Yulin Township, Gansu =

Yulin Township 榆林乡
- Township
- Location in Gansu
- Coordinates: 35°29′5″N 103°8′27″E
- Country: People's Republic of China
- Province: Gansu
- Autonomous prefecture: Linxia Hui Autonomous Prefecture
- County: Linxia County
- Time zone: UTC+8 (China Standard)

Yulin Township (simplified Chinese: 榆林乡; traditional Chinese: 榆林鄉; pinyin: Yúlín Xiāng) is a township under the administration of Linxia County, Gansu, China. As of 2018, it has 8 villages under its administration.

== See also ==
- List of township-level divisions of Gansu
