= Wu Yan =

Wu Yan may refer to:

- Wu Yan (general) (吾彥; fl. 3rd century), general during the Eastern Wu and Jin periods
- Wu Yan (footballer) (吴龑; born 1989), Chinese footballer
- Wu Yan (weightlifter) (吴艳; born 2001), Chinese weightlifter

== See also ==
- Wuyang (disambiguation)
- Wuyan, a village in Pampore, Jammu and Kashmir, India
