= Linxia County =

Linxia County 临夏县 ‌لٍ‌ثِيَا ثِيًا
- County
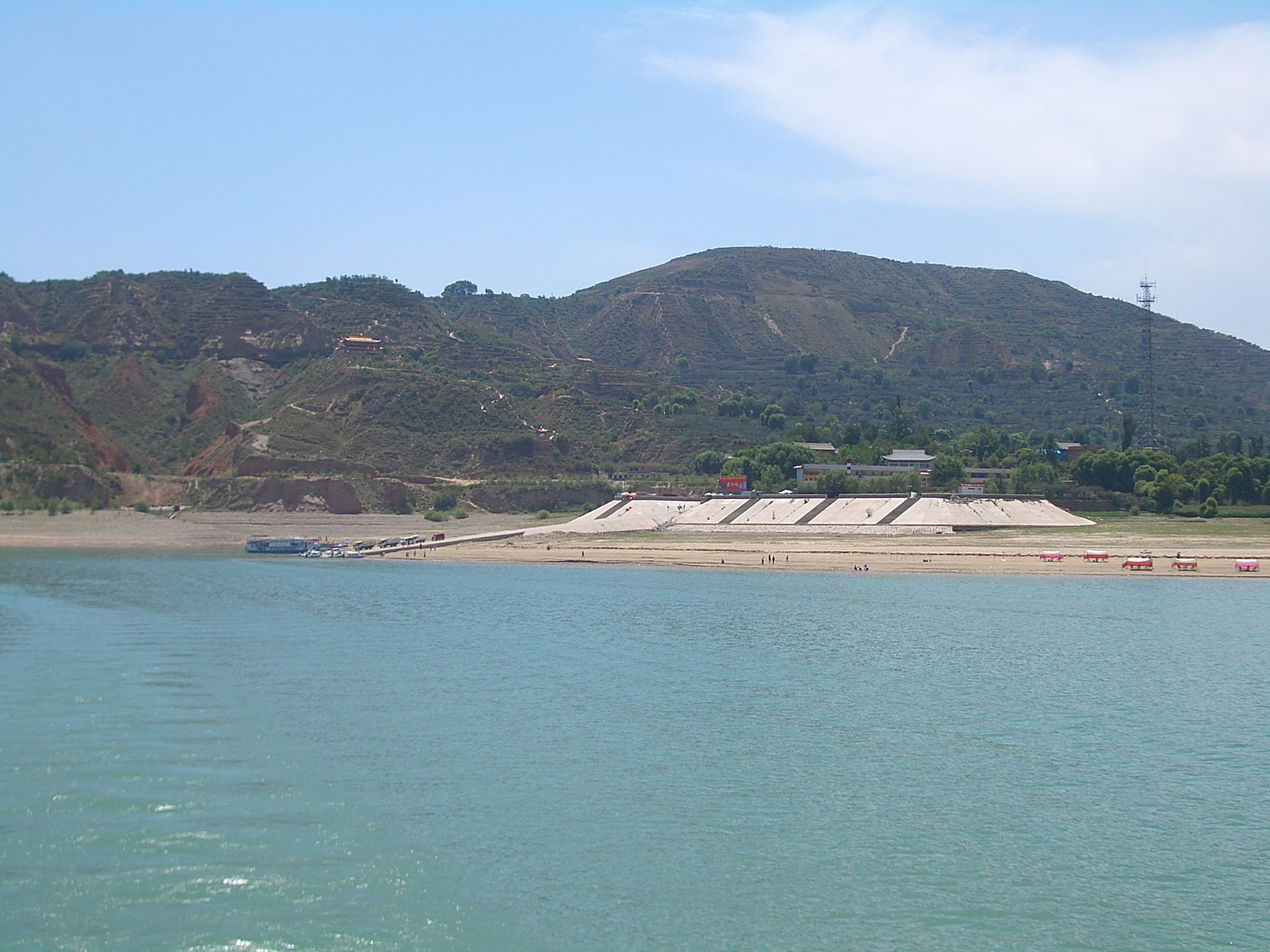
- Linxia County's northern shore, seen from a Liujiaxia Reservoir ferryboat

- Location of the seat in Gansu
- Coordinates (Linxia County government): 35°28′43″N 103°02′27″E
- Country: China
- Province: Gansu
- Autonomous prefecture: Linxia
- County seat: Hanji [zh]

Area
  - Total: 1,212.4 km^{2} (468.1 sq mi)
- Highest elevation: 4,613 m (15,135 ft)
- Lowest elevation: 1,735 m (5,692 ft)

Population (2020)
  - Total: 322,628
  - Density: 266.11/km^{2} (689.21/sq mi)
- Time zone: UTC+8 (China Standard)
- Postal code: 731800
- Website: www.linxiaxian.gov.cn

Linxia County (simplified Chinese: 临夏县; traditional Chinese: 臨夏縣; pinyin: Línxià Xiàn; Wade–Giles: Lin-hsia Hsien, Xiao'erjing: ‌لٍ‌ثِيَا ثِيًا) is a county in the Linxia Hui Autonomous Prefecture, province of Gansu, China.

== Geography ==
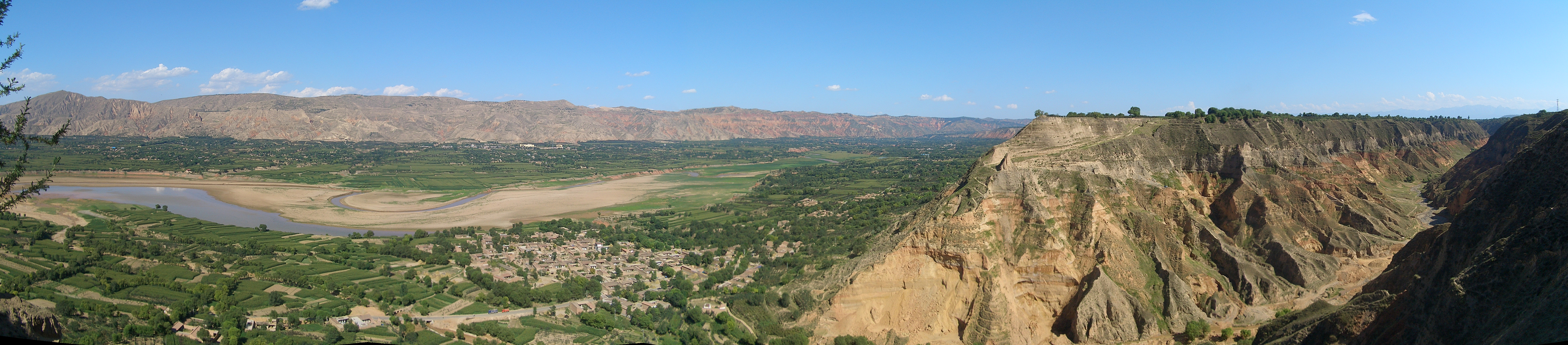
Panorama of the lower Daxia River valley in the northeast of the county, and the loess plateau flanking in, cut by a canyon

Linxia County is located in central and south-western parts of the Linxia Hui Autonomous Prefecture, extending from the shores of Liujiaxia Reservoir in the north (at 1735 m elevation above the sea level, the lowest part of the county), to Taizu Mountains in the south and Dalijia Mountain (达里加山, دَالِ‌ڭِيَا شًا) (at 4613 m elevation above the sea level, the highest point in the county) in the west.

The county's river network is formed primarily by small rivers that flow to the northeast and north from the mountains that line the county's southwestern border toward the Yellow River (i.e., these days, the Liujiaxia Reservoir) near the northern end of the county. The largest of these rivers is the Daxia River (大夏河, دَاثِيَا حَ), which flows from the Gannan Tibetan Autonomous Prefecture to cross Linxia County. The river's lower course forms the border between Linxia County and the neighboring Dongxiang Autonomous County to the east. It forms a large bay at its outfall into the Liujiaxia Reservoir.

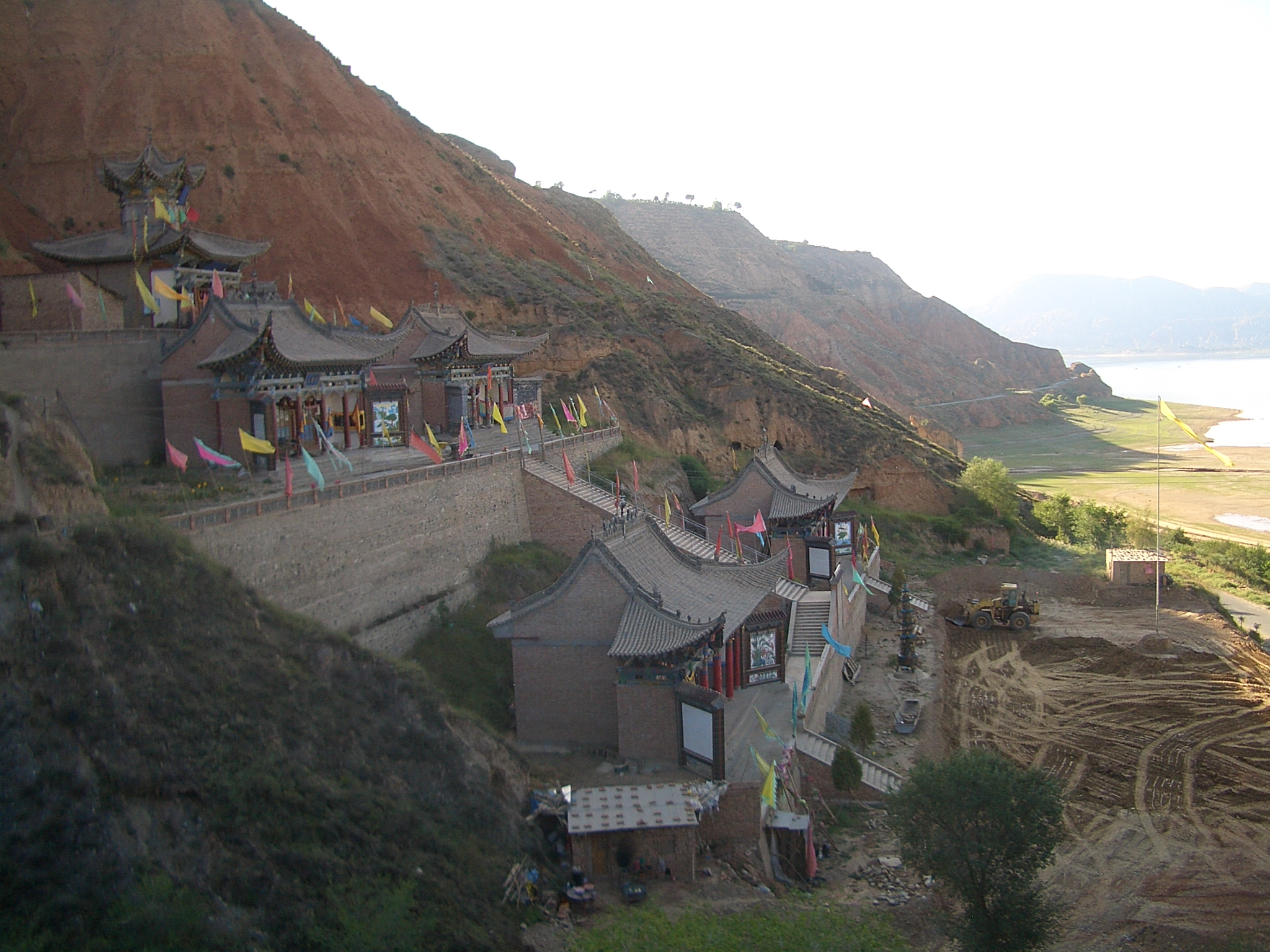
A new temple near the Liujiaxia Reservoir

The county surrounds the prefecture seat, Linxia City, from the north, south, and west, but does not include it, since Linxia City forms a county-level administrative unit of its own.

The county seat is located at Hanji Town (韩集镇, خًاڭِ جٍ), 24 km (15 mi) southwest of Linxia City. While most detailed (prefecture-level) maps label that location accordingly, less detailed (provincial) maps simply mark it as "Linxia County" (临夏县), which still makes it distinct from the county seat (labeled "Linxia City" (临夏市)). More confusingly, even less detailed maps may mark both Linxia City and Hanji Town simply as "Linxia" (临夏).

== Administrative divisions ==
Linxia County is divided to 9 towns and 16 townships.

Towns

- Hanji (韩集镇, خًاڭِ جٍ)
- Tuqiao (土桥镇, تُ‌ٿِيَوْ جٍ)
- Maji (马集镇, مَاڭِ جٍ)
- Lianhua (莲花镇, لِيًاخُوَا جٍ)
- Xinji (新集镇, ثٍ‌ڭِ جٍ)
- Yinji (尹集镇, ءٍڭِ جٍ)
- Diaoqi (刁祁镇, دِيَوْٿِ جٍ)
- Beiyuan (北塬镇, بِيْ‌يُوًا جٍ)
- Huangniwan (黄泥湾镇, خُوَانْ‌نِ‌وًا جٍ)

Townships

- Yingtan Township (营滩乡, يٍ‌تًا ثِيَانْ)
- Zhangzigou Township (掌子沟乡, جَانْ‌زِقِوْ ثِيَانْ)
- Manisigou Township (麻尼寺沟乡, مَانِ‌سِْ‌قِوْ ثِيَان)
- Monigou Township (漠泥沟乡, مُوَنِ‌قِوْ ثِيَانْ)
- Manlu Township (漫路乡, مًالُ ثِيَانْ)
- Yulin Township (榆林乡, ۋِلٍ ثِيَانْ)
- Jinggou Township (井沟乡, ڭٍْ‌قِوْ ثِيَانْ)
- Potou Township (坡头乡, پُوَتِوْ ثِيَانْ)
- Qiaosi Township (桥寺乡, ٿِيَوْسِْ ثِيَانْ)
- Xianfeng Township (先锋乡, ثِيًا‌فٍْ ثِيَانْ)
- Hexi Township (河西乡, حَ‌ثِ ثِيَانْ)
- Anjiapo Township (安家坡乡, اًٿِيَوْپُوَ ثِيَانْ)
- Nanyuan Township (南塬乡, نًايُوًا ثِيَانْ)
- Hongtai Township (红台乡, خْوتَيْ ثِيَانْ)
- Lupan Township (路盘乡, لُپًا ثِيَانْ)
- Minzhu Township (民主乡, مٍ‌جُ ثِيَانْ)

== Population ==
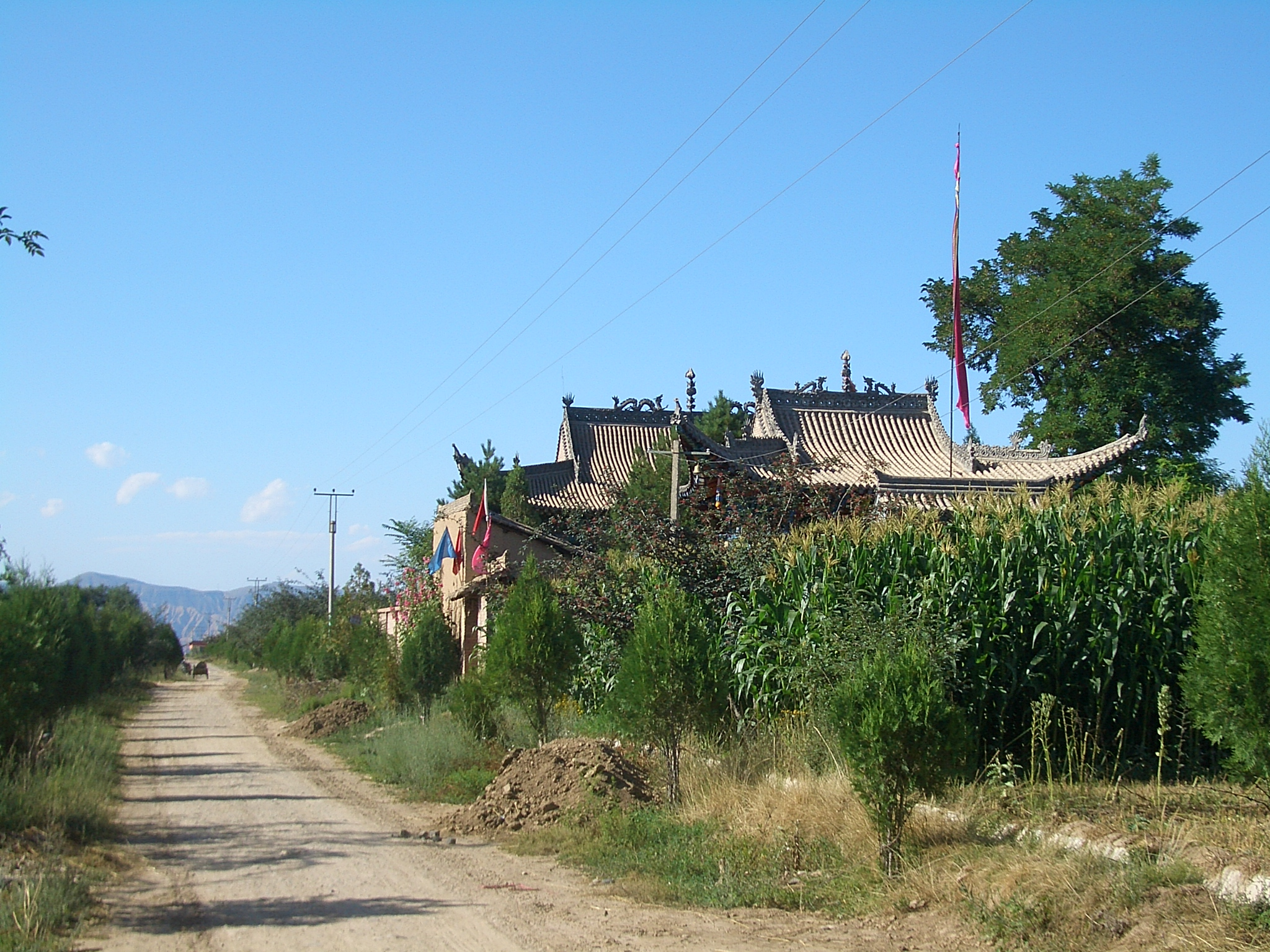
A village temple in Hexi Town

The county's population totaled 375,162 in 2007. The main ethnic groups represented were Han Chinese (221,419 or 59.2% of the total), Hui (121,680 or 32.4%) and Dongxiang (29,782 or 8%). There were also 872 Salar people, 840 Tibetans, 311 Tujia people, 256 Bao'an people, 2 Mongols and 1 Uighur.

The authorities reported that as of 2004, there were 592 places of worship in the county, with 506 clerics of all religions. 267,731 residents (71.62% of the county's population) were reported as religious believers. Of them, the 117,610 reported Muslims had 409 religious facilities (including, 405 mosques) and 445 clerics. The 52,570 Buddhists, with 59 temples, had 49 religious personnel: 31 monks, 15 lamas and 3 living Buddhas. The 97,551 Taoists had 124 temples and 12 clerics. According to the county's official statistics, there were also 138 Christians there, with no churches.

== Transport ==
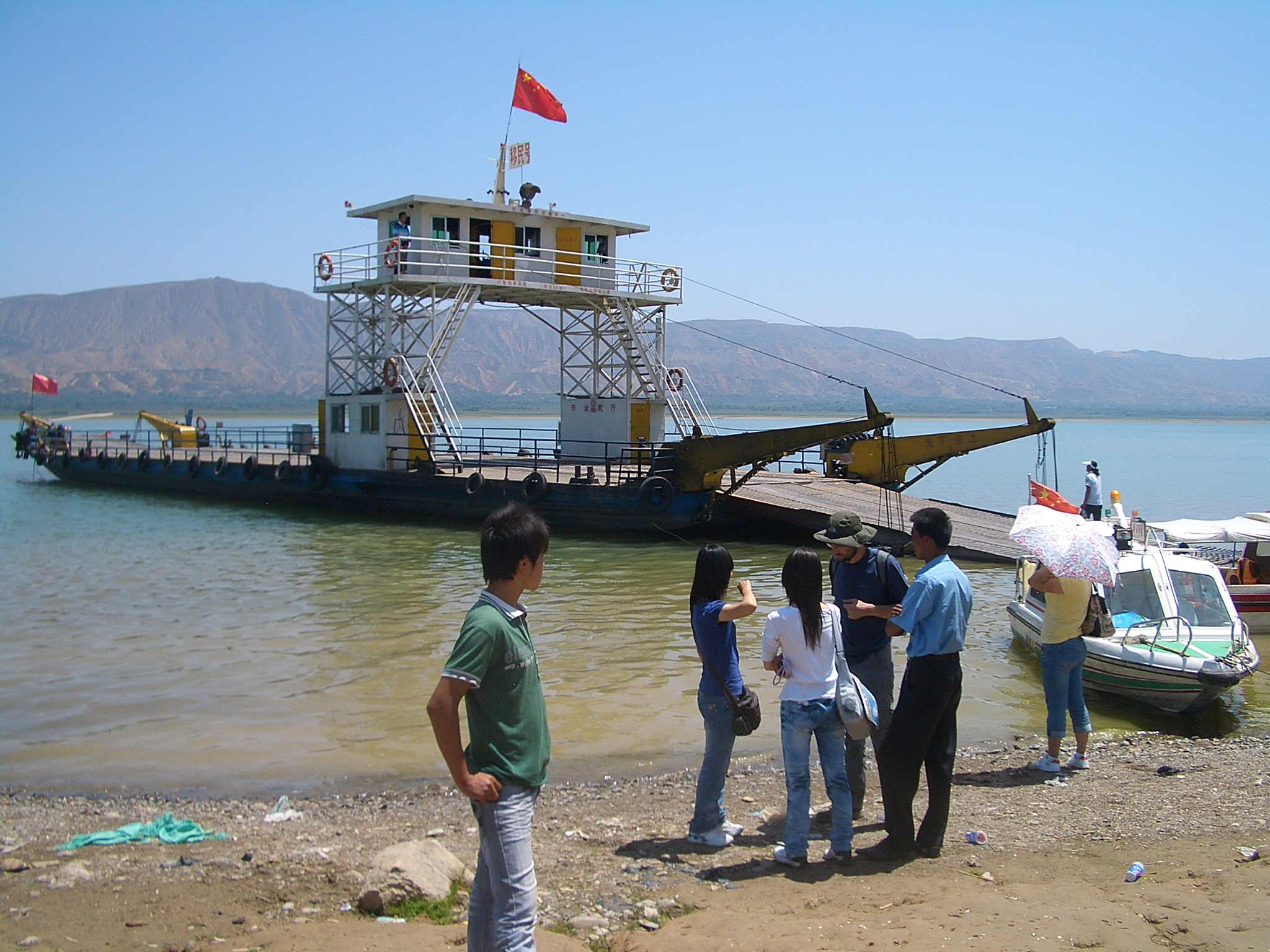
At the Lianhua Tai ferry dock (Lianhua Town)

The county is served by China National Highway 213 (G213), which crosses the county on its way from Lanzhou to southern Gansu, and by a number of provincial highways. Due to the terrain and the remote location, there are no railways, sea ports or civil airports in the county; however, there is an active wharf at Lianhua Tai, on the Liujiaxia Reservoir, which also serves as the port for Linxia City. It is used both by vehicle ferries that provide a more convenient route for travel between Linxia (City or County) and Liujiaxia Town (Yongjing County) than Highway G213 does, and by recreational boaters. One can also hire a boat there to travel to Bingling Temple in Yongjing County.

Due to the county's geography, the main hub of its road network, as well as of public transportation, is actually not within the county itself, but in Linxia City. Minibuses provide passenger service from the city's Eastern Bus Station to Linxia County seat (Hanji Town), Hexi Township, Lianhua Town, and a few other destinations.

== History ==
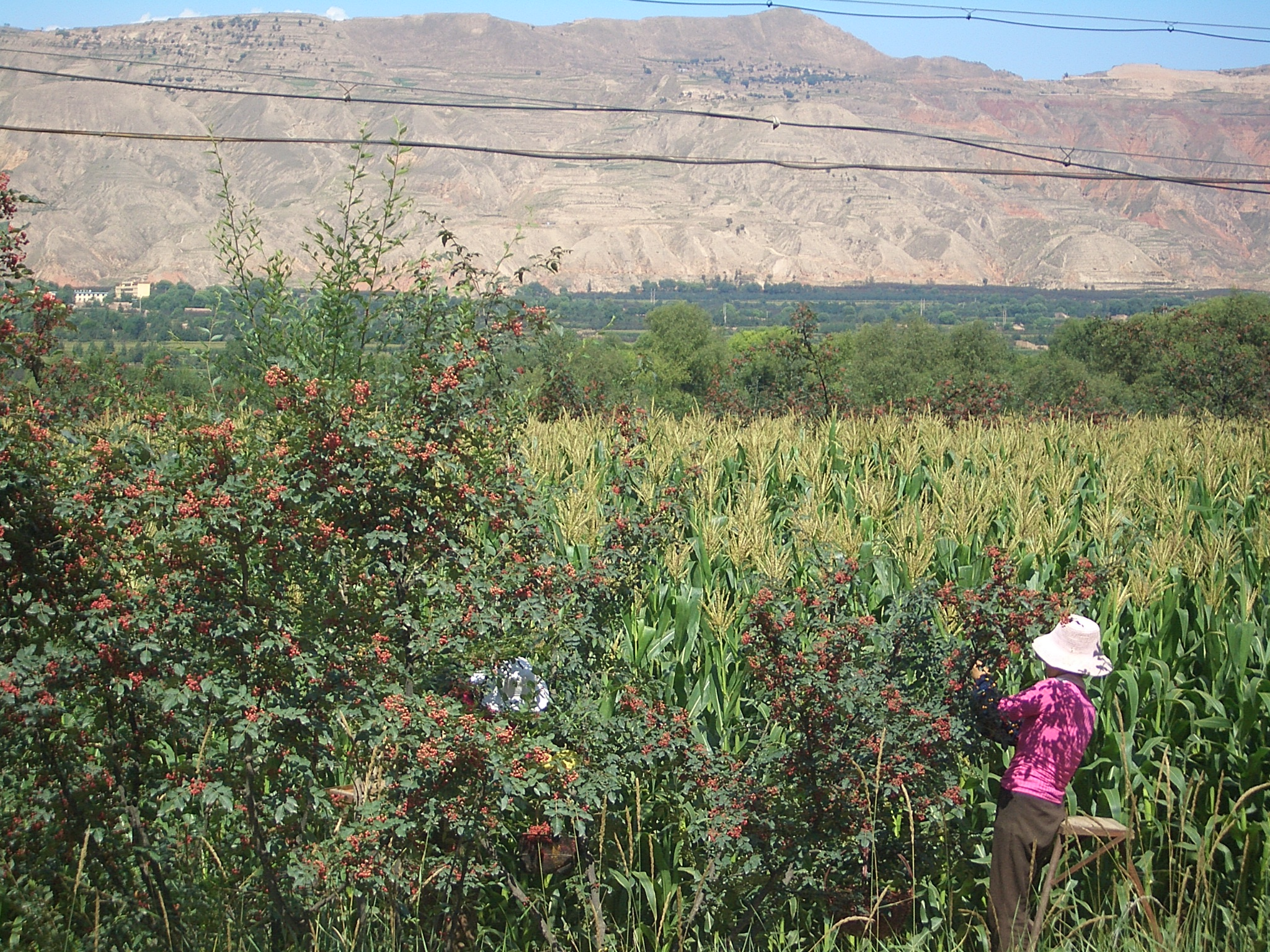
Farmers harvesting Sichuan pepper in the lower Daxia River valley. The hills in the background, on the other side of the river, are in Dongxiang County

During the Ming and Qing Dynasties, the Linxia region was known as Hezhou, and usually was administered as part of Lintao Prefecture (Fu) or Lanzhou Prefecture.

Lanzhou Prefecture was abolished in 1913, and the Linxia area was included into Daohe County (导河县) with the capital in Jiachengguan Town (郊城关镇) (part of today's Linxia City), which in its turn was part of Lanshan Circuit (Dao). In 1928, Daohe County was renamed Linxia County, thus giving origin to its modern name.

After a few more administrative reorganizations during the Republic of China administration, the Linxia region was eventually taken by the Communists during the Lanzhou Campaign (August 22, 1949), and on August 26 the Linxia County of the new Communist state was created, with the capital in Linxia City. On June 23, 1950, Linxia City was separated from Linxia County, and the county seat was moved to Hanji Town. In December 1958 Linxia County was abolished and merged into Linxia City, as was the neighboring Yongjing County, but the counties were restored in December 1961. In December 1973, the opposite thing happened: Linxia City was merged into Linxia County, but on August 31, 1983, this merger was undone again.

== Notable people from Linxia County ==
- Ma Fulu (马福绿, مَا فُ‌لُ) (1854–1900), from Yangzhushan (阳注山) in Hanji Town, is considered a hero of the defense of Beijing against the Eight-Nation Alliance intervention in 1900. Originally buried at a Hui cemetery in Beijing, in 1995 his remains were moved by his descendants to Yangzhushan. Later, his son Ma Hongbin became one of the Ma Clique warlords.
- Ma Fuxiang (马福祥, مَا فُ‌ثِيَانْ) (1876–1932), a half-brother of Ma Fulu, also from near Hanji Town. Along with his brother Ma Fulu he fought in Beijing in 1900, and went on to become an important warlord/politician during the Republic of China era. His oldest son Ma Hongkui, too, became one of the Ma Clique warlords.
- Brothers Ma Bufang (1903–1975) (马步芳, مَا بُ‌فَانْ) and Ma Buqing (1901–1977) (马步青 مَا بُ‌ٿٍْ), from Monigou Township (漠泥沟乡), the other two warlords from the Ma Clique, controlled the region until expelled by the Communists in August 1949.
