= Wuyang =

Wuyang may refer to Chinese places:

- Wuyang County, in Henan, China
- Wuyang New Town, in Guangzhou, Guangdong, China

== Towns and townships ==
- Wuyang, Suining (武阳镇), a town of Suining County, Hunan province.
- Wuyang, Zhang County (武阳镇), town and county seat of Zhang County, Gansu

== See also ==
- Wuyan, a village in Pampore, Jammu and Kashmir, India
