= Kangle County =

Kangle County 康乐县 کَانْ‌لِ ثِيًآ
- County
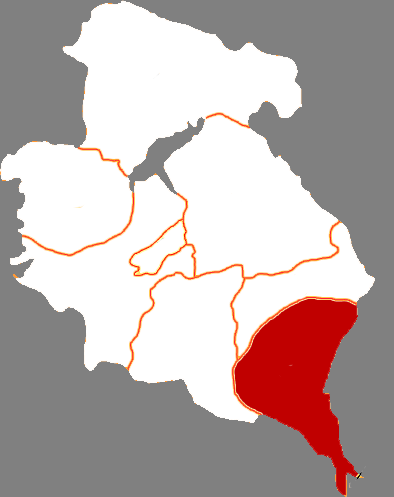
- Kangle in Linxia

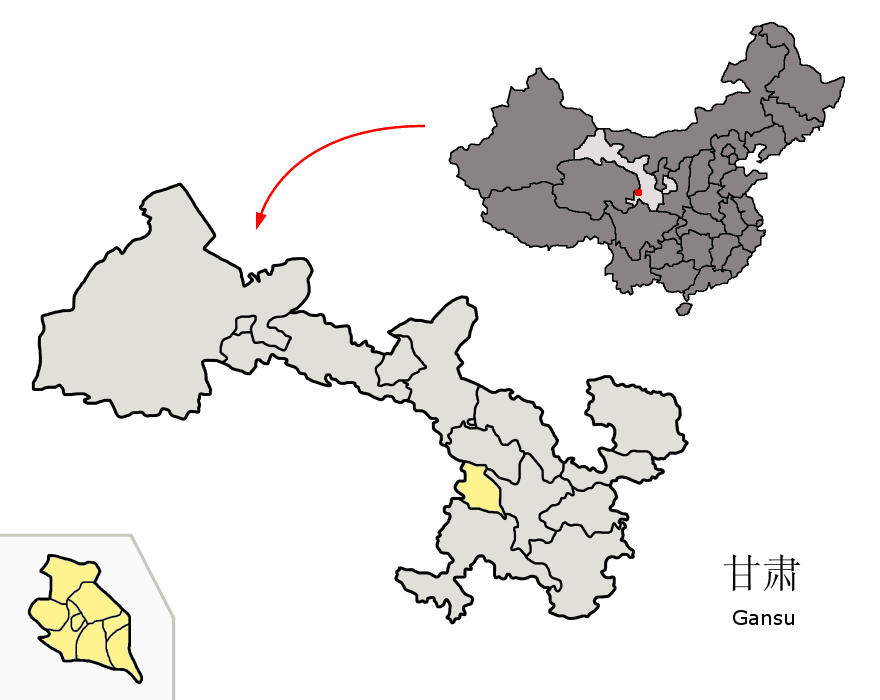
- Linxia in Gansu

- Location in Gansu Location in China
- Coordinates (Kangle government): 35°22′14″N 103°42′30″E
- Country: China
- Province: Gansu
- Autonomous prefecture: Linxia
- County seat: Fucheng

Area
  - Total: 1,083 km^{2} (418 sq mi)

Population (2020)
  - Total: 255,955
  - Density: 236.3/km^{2} (612.1/sq mi)
- Time zone: UTC+8 (China Standard)
- Postal code: 731500
- Website: www.gskanglexian.gov.cn

Kangle County (simplified Chinese: 康乐县; traditional Chinese: 康樂縣; pinyin: Kānglè Xiàn; Wade–Giles: K’ang-lo Hsien, Xiao'erjing: کَانْ‌لِ ثِيًآ) is a county in the Linxia Hui Autonomous Prefecture, Gansu, China. With ethnic minority of the Dongxiang.

According to History of Song, Kangle County was first established in 1073 (the sixth year of Xining; Chinese: 熙寧六年).

== Administrative divisions ==
Kangle County is divided to 5 towns and 10 townships.

Towns

- Fucheng (附城镇)
- Suji (苏集镇)
- Rouge (胭脂镇)
- Jinggu (景古镇)
- Lianlu (莲麓镇)

Townships

- Kangfeng Township (康丰乡)
- Huguan Township (虎关乡)
- Ruchuan Township (流川乡)
- Baiwang Township (白王乡)
- Basong Township (八松乡)
- Minglu Township (鸣鹿乡)
- Badan Township (八丹乡)
- Shangwan Township (上湾乡)
- Caotan Township (草滩乡)
- Wuhu Township (五户乡)

== Climate ==
Climate data for Kangle, elevation 2,016 m (6,614 ft), (1991–2020 normals, extremes 1981–2010)
Month	Jan	Feb	Mar	Apr	May	Jun	Jul	Aug	Sep	Oct	Nov	Dec	Year
Record high °C (°F)	14.7 (58.5)	20.5 (68.9)	27.1 (80.8)	29.9 (85.8)	31.1 (88.0)	31.5 (88.7)	36.1 (97.0)	33.7 (92.7)	31.0 (87.8)	24.8 (76.6)	20.0 (68.0)	13.1 (55.6)	36.1 (97.0)
Mean daily maximum °C (°F)	1.6 (34.9)	5.5 (41.9)	11.1 (52.0)	17.1 (62.8)	20.8 (69.4)	23.9 (75.0)	25.9 (78.6)	24.8 (76.6)	19.9 (67.8)	14.5 (58.1)	8.8 (47.8)	3.1 (37.6)	14.8 (58.5)
Daily mean °C (°F)	−7.2 (19.0)	−2.6 (27.3)	3.2 (37.8)	9.0 (48.2)	13.0 (55.4)	16.5 (61.7)	18.5 (65.3)	17.6 (63.7)	13.2 (55.8)	7.3 (45.1)	0.6 (33.1)	−5.4 (22.3)	7.0 (44.6)
Mean daily minimum °C (°F)	−13.3 (8.1)	−8.4 (16.9)	−2.5 (27.5)	2.2 (36.0)	6.2 (43.2)	9.9 (49.8)	12.2 (54.0)	12.0 (53.6)	8.4 (47.1)	2.5 (36.5)	−4.4 (24.1)	−11 (12)	1.1 (34.1)
Record low °C (°F)	−26.8 (−16.2)	−23.9 (−11.0)	−19.7 (−3.5)	−8.1 (17.4)	−2.5 (27.5)	1.4 (34.5)	3.5 (38.3)	3.5 (38.3)	−1.5 (29.3)	−8.2 (17.2)	−21.9 (−7.4)	−32.2 (−26.0)	−32.2 (−26.0)
Average precipitation mm (inches)	4.6 (0.18)	7.1 (0.28)	15.3 (0.60)	34.0 (1.34)	64.5 (2.54)	68.7 (2.70)	112.3 (4.42)	103.7 (4.08)	67.0 (2.64)	38.0 (1.50)	8.7 (0.34)	2.4 (0.09)	526.3 (20.71)
Average precipitation days (≥ 0.1 mm)	4.7	5.2	7.4	8.7	12.0	13.3	13.9	13.6	13.4	10.1	4.3	2.3	108.9
Average snowy days	7.9	8.2	7.9	3.2	0.3	0	0	0	0	1.9	4.7	5.4	39.5
Average relative humidity (%)	62	61	60	58	63	68	72	75	79	77	71	65	68
Mean monthly sunshine hours	174.0	167.8	189.4	206.3	220.7	214.0	223.6	211.1	152.0	159.8	174.6	181.7	2,275
Percentage possible sunshine	56	54	51	52	51	49	51	51	41	46	57	60	52
Source: China Meteorological Administration
