= Linxia Hui Autonomous Prefecture =

Linxia Prefecture 临夏州 · لٍ‌ثِيَا جِوْ
- Autonomous prefecture
- Linxia Hui Autonomous Prefecture 临夏回族自治州 لٍ‌ثِيَا خُوِزُوْ زِجِ‌جِوْ
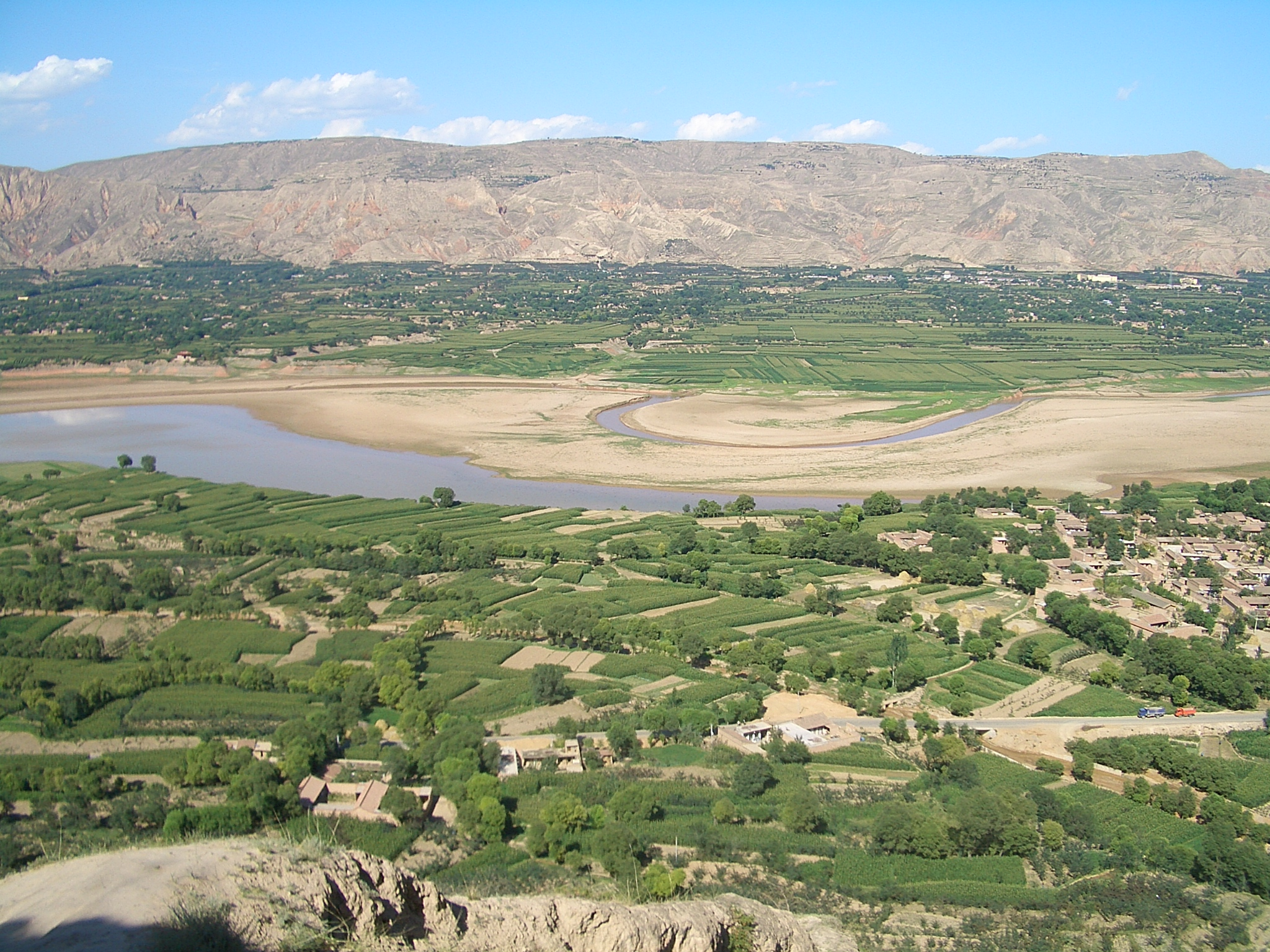
- Fields and gardens in the Valley of Daxia River. The river flows to the north (to the left in the picture), into Liujiaxia Reservoir, separating Linxia County (foreground) from Dongxiang Autonomous County (background)

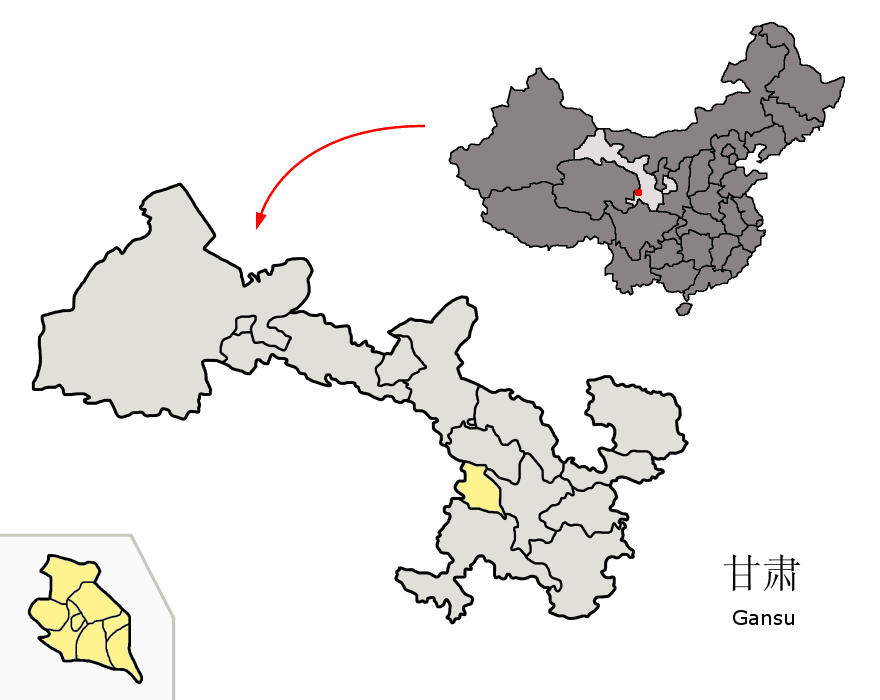
- Location of Linxia Prefecture within Gansu
- Coordinates (Linxia Prefecture government): 35°36′06″N 103°12′37″E
- Country: People's Republic of China
- Province: Gansu
- Seat: Linxia City

Area
  - Total: 8,169 km^{2} (3,154 sq mi)

Population (2020)Census Nov 2020
  - Total: 2,437,000

GDP
  - Total: CN¥ 21.1 billion US$ 3.4 billion
  - Per capita: CN¥ 10,527; US$ 1,690
- Time zone: UTC+8 (China Standard)
- ISO 3166 code: CN-GS-29
- Website: www.linxia.gov.cn

Linxia Hui Autonomous Prefecture (simplified Chinese: 临夏回族自治州; traditional Chinese: 臨夏回族自治州; pinyin: Línxià Huízú Zìzhìzhōu, Xiao'erjing: لٍ‌ثِيَا خُوِزُوْ زِجِ‌جِوْ), formerly known as Hezhou (河州) and Fuhan (枹罕), is located in Gansu Province, south of the provincial capital Lanzhou, bordering Qinghai to the west. It is an autonomous prefecture for the Muslim Hui people, a large Chinese ethnic group. It also includes two autonomous counties for other Muslim groups, namely Bonan, Dongxiang and Salar.

== Geography and climate ==
Linxia Prefecture is located in southwestern central Gansu. It is just south of Lanzhou and borders Qinghai Province in the west, Gannan Tibetan Autonomous Prefecture in the south and the Dingxi prefecture-level city in the east.

The terrain is highlands, mountains and loess hills. Elevation averages 2000 meters above sea-level.

The Yellow River, which gets its muddy yellow color from the loess, runs through the northwestern part of the prefecture. Dammed at Liujiaxia (Yongjing County), it forms the large Liujiaxia Reservoir in the north-central part of the county. There is also a smaller Yanguoxia Dam (盐锅峡水电站; Yánguōxiá Shuǐdiànzhàn) further downstream, also within Yongjing County.

The Yellow River's main tributaries within the prefecture are the Daxia River and the Tao River. They flow from the neighboring Gannan Prefecture and fall into the Liujiaxia Reservoir from the southeast. The Tao River also serves as the border with the Dingxi prefecture-level city over some of its length.

The year's average temperature is 8 °C and the annual frost-free period is only 155 frost-free days. The area is semi-arid with annual precipitation of only 442 mm (17.4 in). Total area is 8,169 km^{2} (3,154 sq mi).

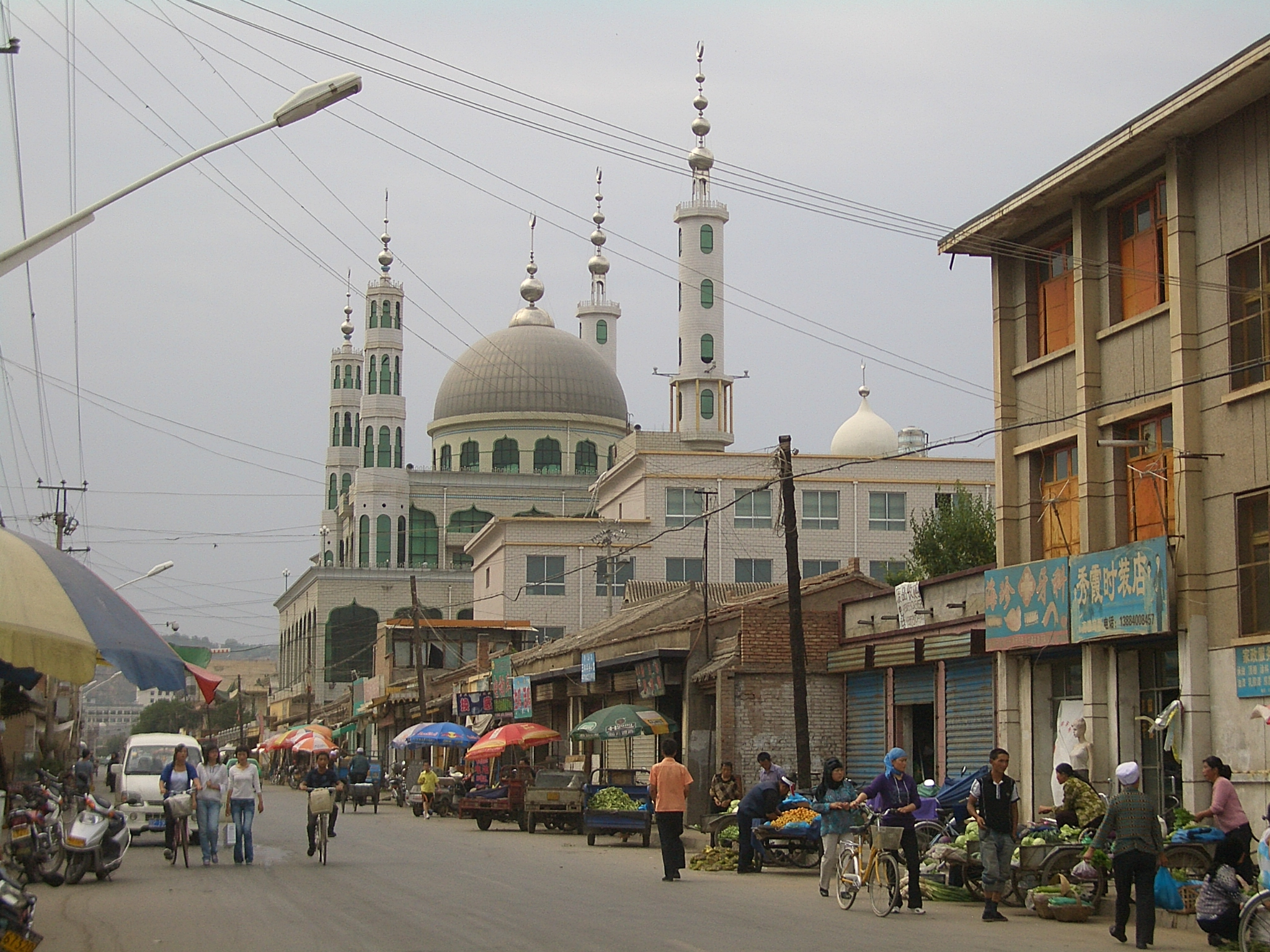
Qianheyan Mosque, Linxia City

== History and culture ==
In the past, Linxia City was called Hezhou and the surrounding area was known as He Prefecture.

=== The Hui Minorities War ===
During the Hui Minorities' War in the 1860s He Prefecture was a scene of fierce fighting between the Muslim (Hui, Dongxiang and Salar, in modern terms) rebels on one side and the Han Chinese militias and, later, government troops, on the other side. From 1862 to 1872, Hezhou City (today's Linxia City) was the stronghold of the Muslim (mostly Hui) rebels led by the Khufiyya imam Ma Zhan'ao and his associates Ma Haiyan and Ma Qianling. The Han Chinese's resistance to the rebellion throughout the northern and eastern parts of the then Hezhou Prefecture (today's Yongjing County and Dongxiang County of Linxia Prefecture and Lintao County of Dingxi City) was headed by the Kong family, one of whose main home villages was Dachuan in today's Yongjing County (within 6 km or 3.7 mi from the county seat, Liujiaxia Town). The conflict was further complicated by the fact that some members of the Kong clan had, in fact, intermarried with the Hui people.

Large number of people lost their lives on both sides of the conflict, in particular during the rebels' attacks on Kong clan's villages around Dachuan 1864.

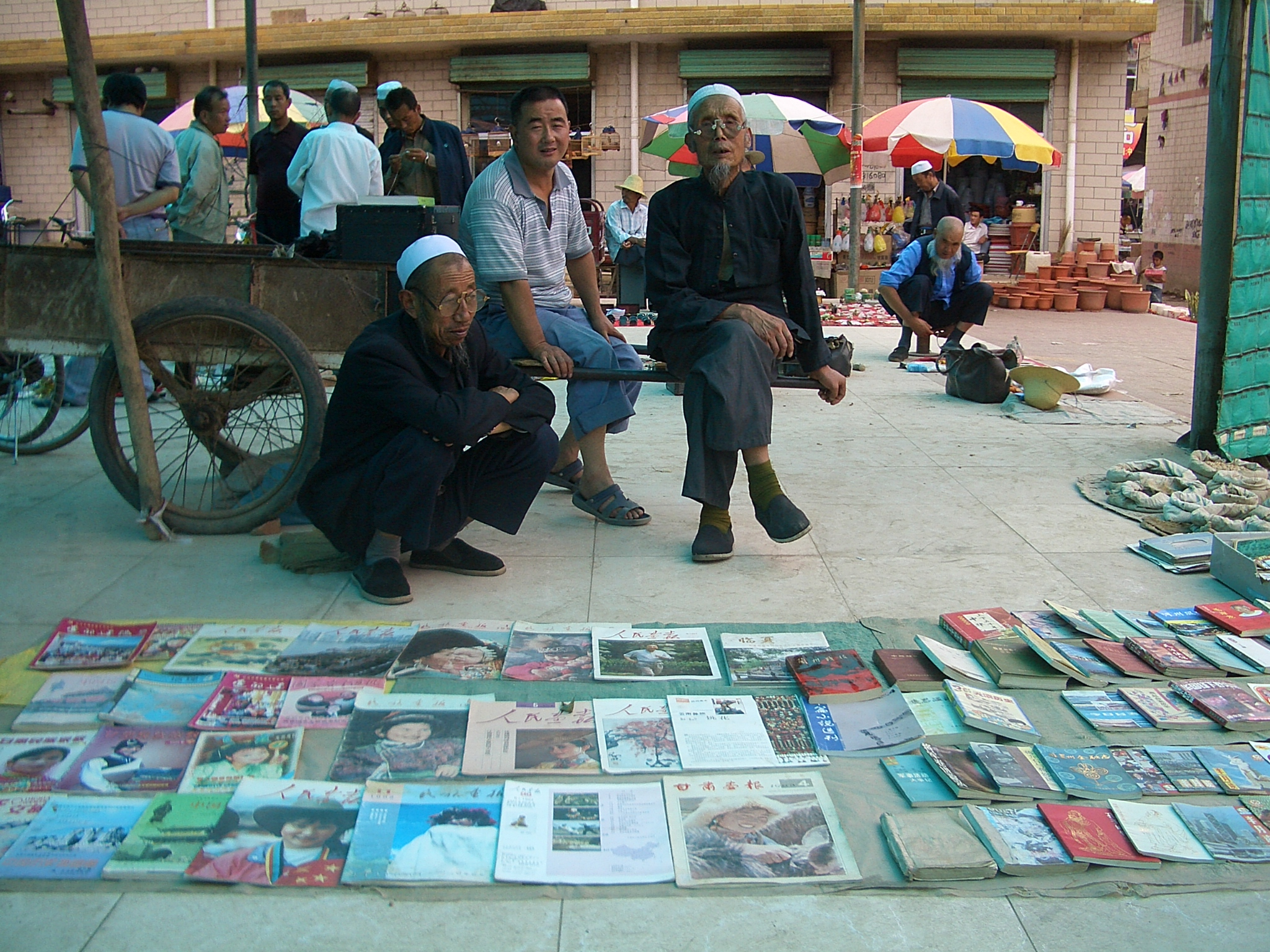
Two Hui book vendors at a Linxia City market, wearing traditional eyeglasses

After the Qing general Zuo Zongtang had finally destroyed the rebels farther east, in Shaanxi and Ningxia, he tried to take Hezhou in late 1872, but his troops were badly defeated by Ma Zhan'ao's Muslim fighters at the battle of Taizi Mosque, and he failed to make a foothold west of the Tao River (which today more or less forms the border between Dingxi and Linxia Prefectures). Ma Zhan'ao, however, realized that he could not hold against the Qing armies forever and made a deal with Zuo Zongtang: he surrendered Hezhou to the government forces, executed those locals who objected to the surrender and joined the government side himself, to fight against the rebels farther west. In exchange, Zuo Zontang did not disperse the local Muslim community, forcibly relocating the survivors to a remote region, but, in a unique gesture during that war, acted to reduce the inter-communal tension by relocating some of the local Han people away from the Muslims. Nonetheless, in order to ensure the government's control over the region, since 1873 Muslims were prohibited to live within the city walls of Hezhou.

Linxia (Hezhou) was often wracked by these frequent rebellions. The entire southern suburbs of the city (ba fang) "eight blocks" was ruined in 1928 by savage fighting between the Muslims and Guominjun forces during the Muslim Conflict in Gansu (1927–1930).

Well-known Muslim individuals in Hezhou in the 1940s included La Shih-Chun, who was part of the Gansu Provincial Government Committee and Ma Chuanyuan, the supermagistrate of five districts.

=== The hydro dams ===
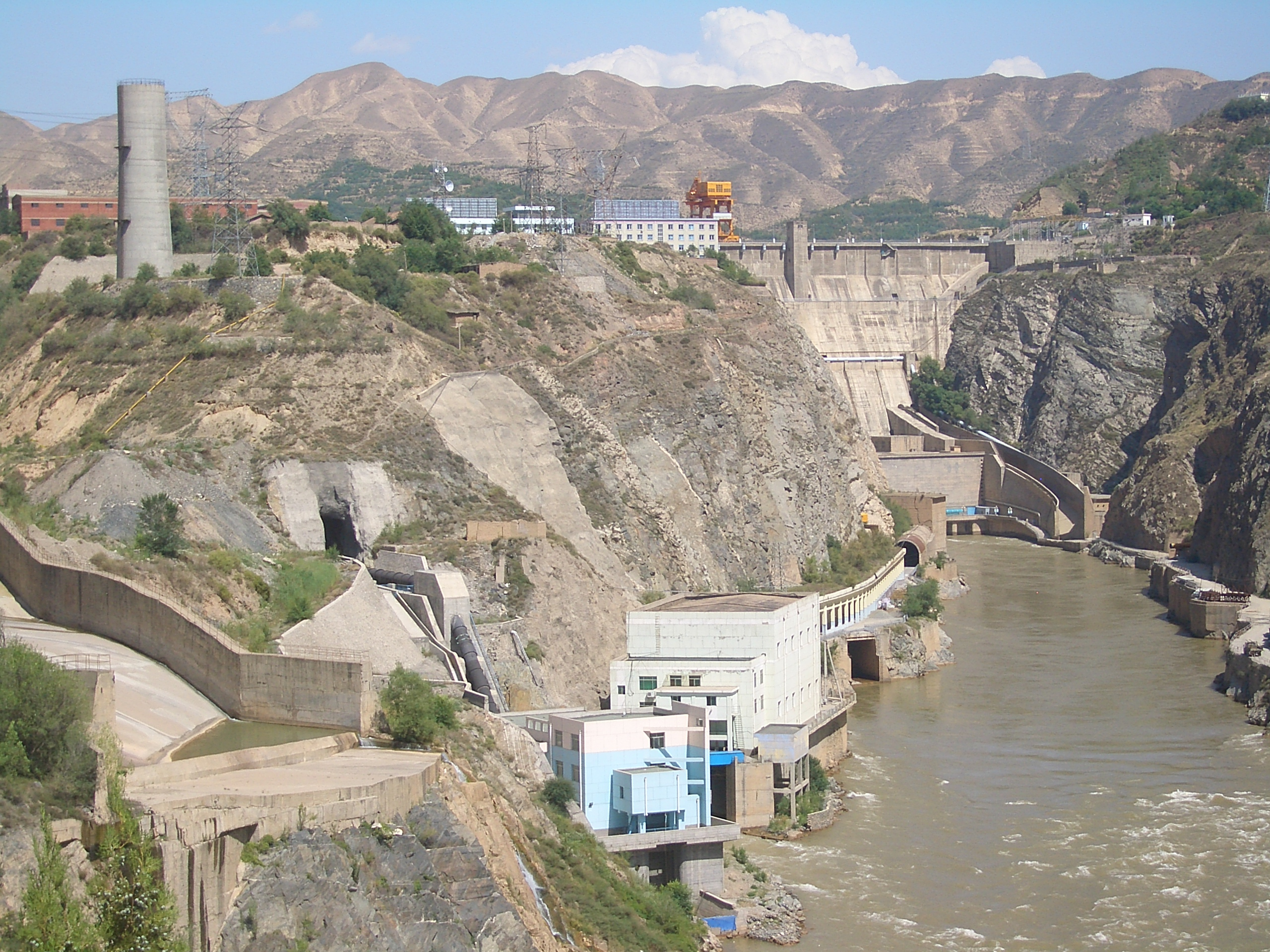
The Liujiaxia Dam, in Liujia Gorge

In 1955, just a few years after the creation of the People's Republic of China, the Communist government announced a large-scale program of hydroelectric dam construction on the Yellow River. Two of them were constructed in Linxia Prefecture's Yongjing County: the 57-meter high Yanguoxia Dam (1958–1961) and the 147-meter high Liujiaxia Dam (1958–1969). One more – the 33-meter high Bapanxia Dam (1968–1975) – although located in Lanzhou's Xigu District, had much of its reservoir within Yongjing County as well. The dams contributed greatly to the national economy – Liujiaxia Hydro Power Station remained the country's largest until the 1980s – but the reservoirs they created in narrow, but fertile valleys of the Yellow River and its tributaries displaced a large number of local farmers. The three reservoirs flooded 118,229 (7,881 hectares) of farmland and displaced 43,829 residents, primarily in Yongjing County. The compensation payments to the farmers affected by the Yanguoxia and Liujiaxia Dams averaged, supposedly, 250 yuan and 364 yuan per person, were grossly insufficient to allow them to reestablish their way of life. It is said that the residents received lower compensation amount than they could otherwise because in 1958, when the Yanguoxia project started, they understated the value of their assets, as they were afraid to be classified as "rich peasants", i.e. class enemies.

Even the more generous payments (averaging 1,100 per person) to those affected by the Bapanxia Dam were not an adequate substitute for the loss of the farmland.

=== Traditional local products ===
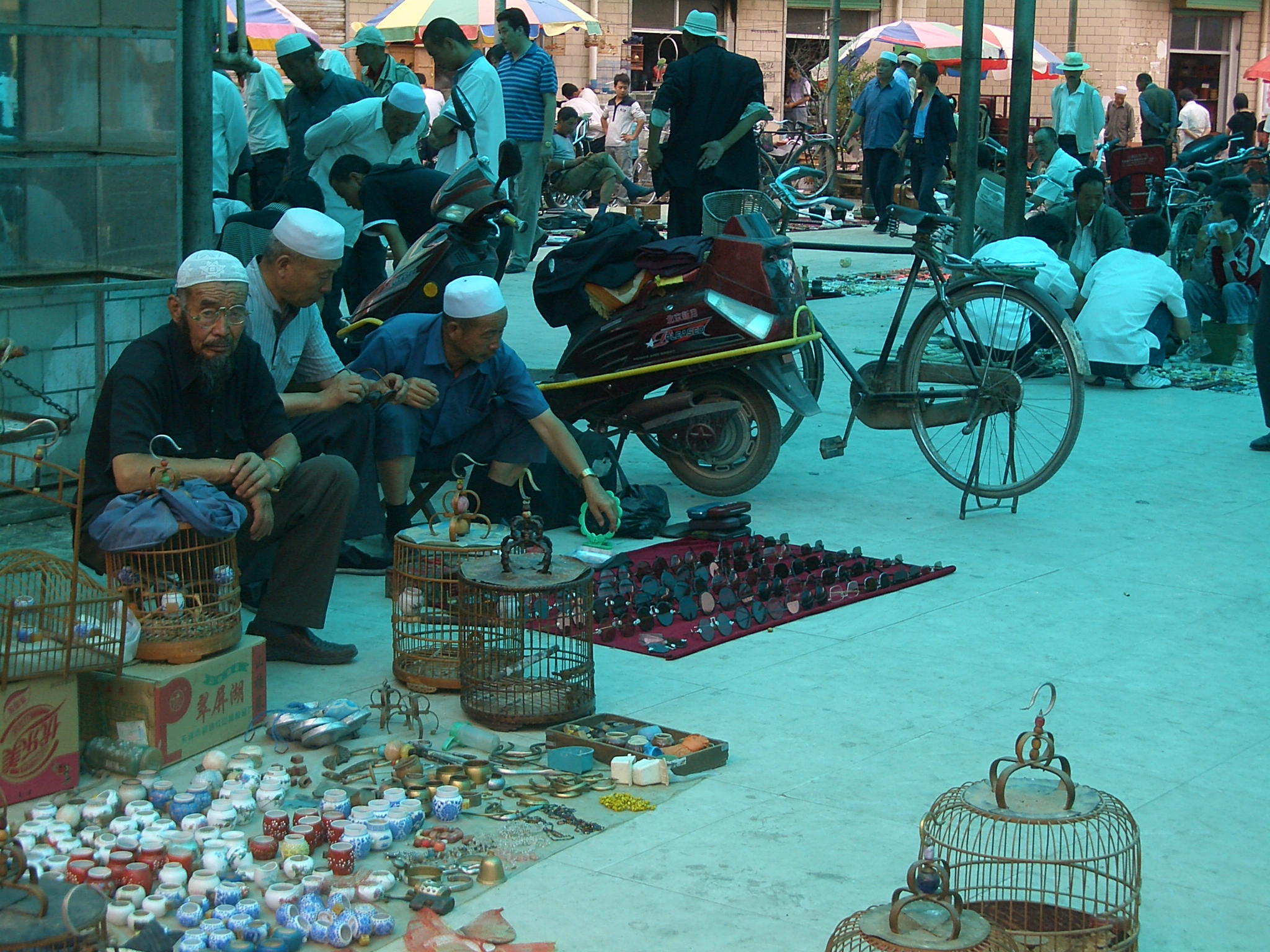
Street vendor selling Linxia glasses

Linxia is famous for a certain style of round glasses worn during the Qing Dynasty that are still made there today.

=== Food ===
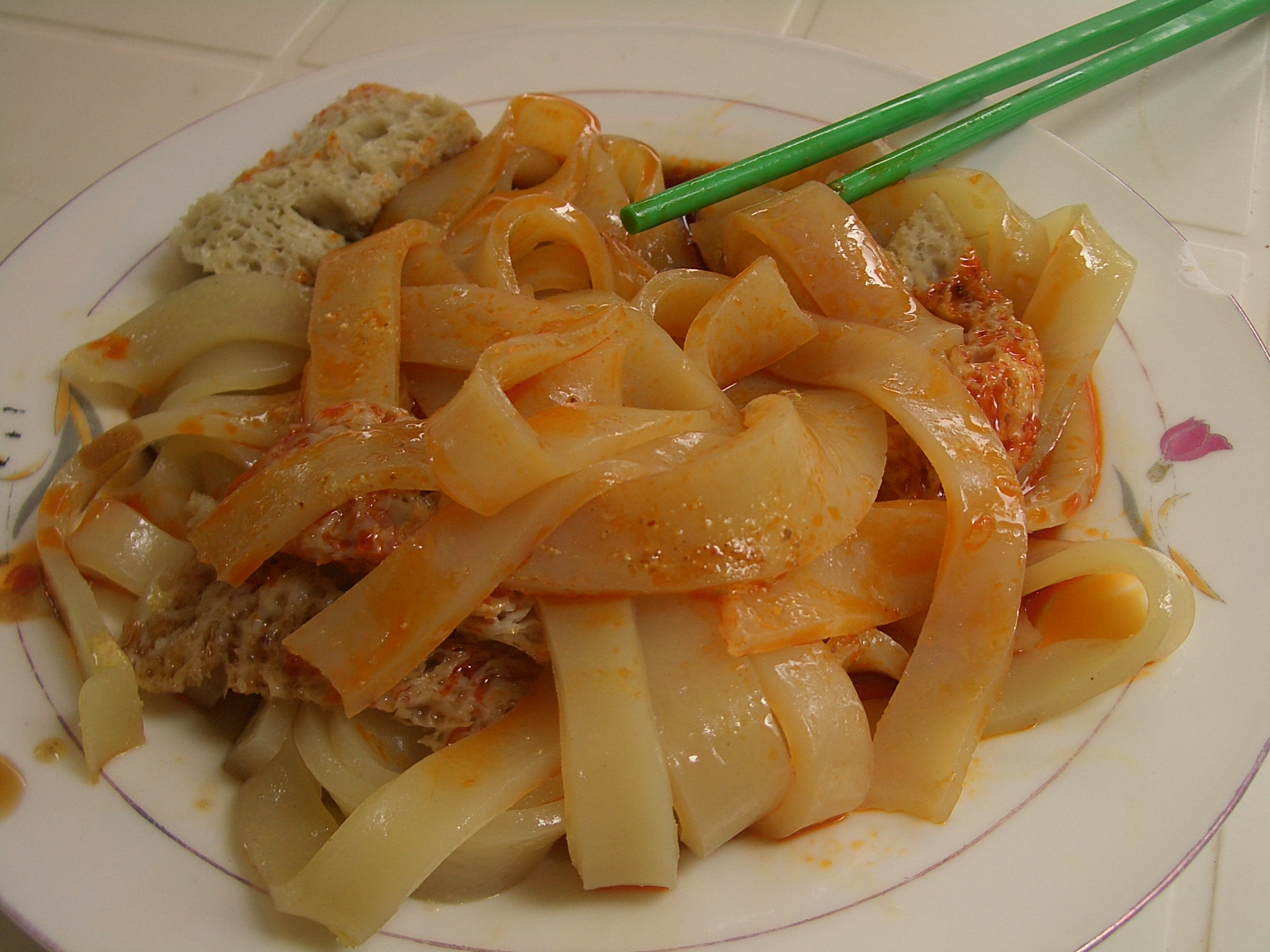
Niangpi being served in Linxia

A type of thick cold wheat noodles called Niangpi (a species of Liangpi) is a popular local dish, served with spongy tofu and spicy sauce.

== Administration ==
The CCP established the Linxia Hui Autonomous Prefecture in 1956 out of seven counties including Linxia City (Hezhou). In accordance with the 1954 PRC Constitution, autonomous prefectures were empowered to enact legislation in light of local circumstances. Theoretically, this would modify national law to accord with Shariah in case of the Hui ethnicity. However, in the nearly sixty years of Party-State rule (2010s), only seven local regulations have been passed pursuant to the power of legal autonomy. The only regulations that address Sharia (without naming it) are:

1. The Measures on Linxia Hui Autonomous Prefecture Halal Food Administration.
2. The Linxia Hui Autonomous Prefecture Religious Affairs Administrative Measures regulating mosques, mosque property, and mosque communities without reference to their Sharia equivalents (e.g., mosque property as Awqaf or pious endowments).

The prefecture is subdivided into 8 county-level divisions: 1 county-level city, 5 counties and 2 autonomous counties:

Map
Note: Taizishan National Nature Reserve is part of Linxia County, Hezheng County and Kangle County.
Name	Hanzi	Hanyu Pinyin	Xiao'erjing Script	Population (2010)	Area (km^{2})	Density (/km^{2})
Linxia City	临夏市	Línxià Shì	لٍِ‌ثِيَا شِ	274,466	88	3,189
Linxia County	临夏县	Línxià Xiàn	‌لٍ‌ثِيَا ثِيًا	326,123	1,212	269
Kangle County	康乐县	Kānglè Xiàn	کَانْ‌لِ ثِيًآ	233,173	1,361	171
Yongjing County	永靖县	Yǒngjìng Xiàn	یٌ‌ڭٍـْ ثِيًا	180,161	1,863	97
Guanghe County	广河县	Guǎnghé Xiàn	قُوَانْ‌حَ ثِيًا	227,466	556	409
Hezheng County	和政县	Hézhèng Xiàn	حَ‌جٍْ ثِيًا	185,083	960	193
Dongxiang Autonomous County	东乡族自治县	Dōngxiāngzú Zìzhìxiàn	دْوثِيَانٌ‌زُو زِجِ‌ثِيًا	284,507	1,467	194
Jishishan Bonan, Dongxiang and Salar Autonomous County	积石山保安族 东乡族撒拉族自治县	Jīshíshān Bǎo'ānzú; Dōngxiāngzú Sālāzú Zìzhìxiàn	ڭِ‌شِ‌شًا بَوْاًزُو دْوثِيَانْ‌زُو سَالَازُو زِجِ‌ثِيًا	235,698	910	259

== Demographics ==
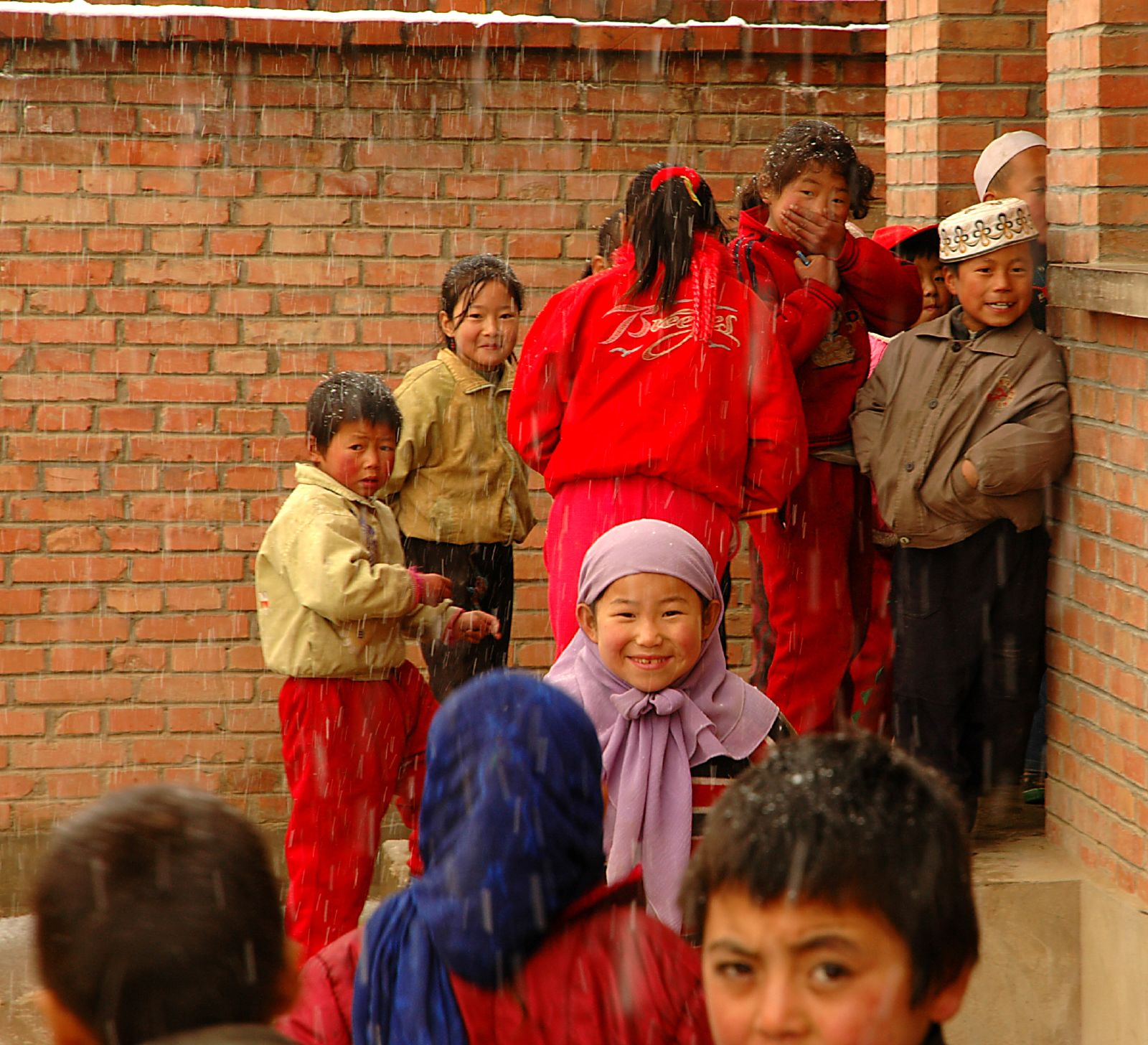
Children at a primary school in Jishishan County

2008 population was 2 million people. 2010 census counted 1,946,677. 2020–11 Census increased to 2,437,000. Average population density is 233 per km^{2}. Ethnic groups include

1. Han 39.7%
2. Hui 31.59%
3. Dongxiang 25.99%
4. Baoan 0.92%
5. Tu 0.71%
6. Salar 0.65%
7. Tibetans 0.4%

Altogether there are 16 minority ethnic groups with a population of 1,469,511; 60.3% of the total population of Linxia.

== Transport ==
China National Highway 213 crosses the prefecture from Lanzhou border in the north to the Gannan border in the south, via Liujiaxia Town (Yongjing County seat), Dongxiang County seat, and Linxia City. There is now a shortcut between Liujiaxia Town and Linxia City, bypassing Dongxiang County and crossing the Liujiaxia Reservoir on a ferry instead.

A number of provincial roads connect all other county seats of the prefecture with Linxia City as well.

The eastern part of the prefecture is connected with Lanzhou via the Lanhai expressway (G75), which, however, runs not within the prefecture itself, but within the Dingxia prefecture-level city, just on the other side of the prefecture border.

The railway transport in the prefecture is limited to a short branch line in its very north, connecting the industrial Liujiaxia Town with the Lanzhou-Xining mainline (which runs along the northern border of the prefecture, but mostly on the Lanzhou prefecture side of it).

== Economy ==
Linxia's 2002 GDP was 3.3 billion RMB, which was 10.7% growth over the previous year. The per capita GDP was 1,778RMB, which was 9.9% growth over the previous year. Agriculture, manufacturing, building materials, finance, hydropower (Liujiaxia Dam and Yanguoxia Dam on the Yellow River), and tourism are all important industries. The prefecture's capital, Linxia City (formerly known as Hezhou), is the center of trade, transport, and industry for the area directly south of Lanzhou.

== Tourism ==
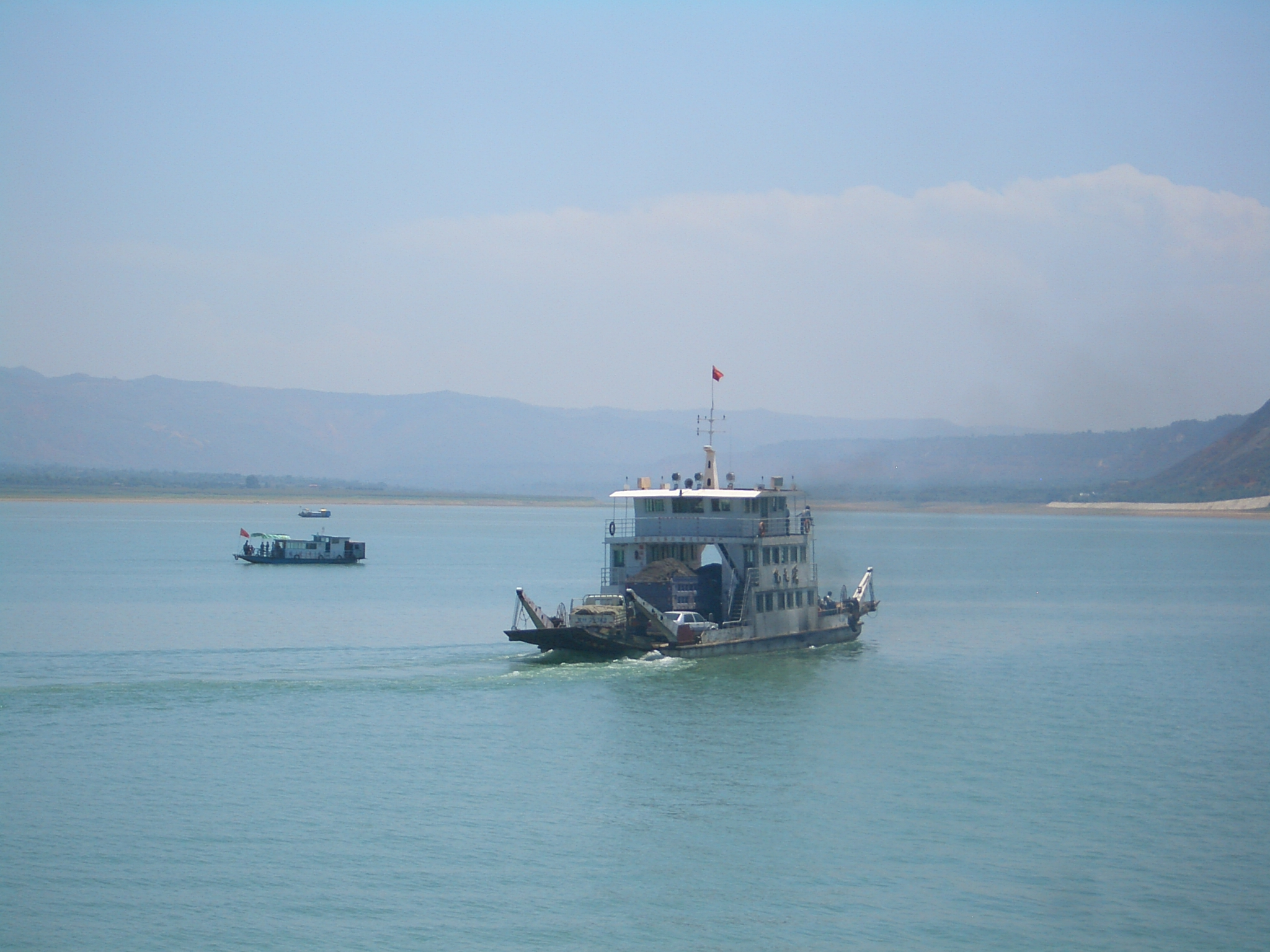
A ferry crosses the Liujiaxia Reservoir from Yongjing County to Linxia County

Linxia is blessed with both natural and cultural wonders. The Yellow River runs through the north of the prefecture, forming a larger reservoir at Yongjing's Liujiaxia Dam, and a smaller one at Yanguoxia Dam further downstream.

Yongjing's Liujiaxia wharf (near Liujiaxia Dam) is also the starting point to trips to the Bingling Temple's ancient Buddhist cave grottoes.

Dinosaur fossils and footprints have been discovered in the dry rugged Badland-esque terrain, resulting in the creation of Liujiaxia National Dinosaur Geopark (刘家峡恐龙国家地质公园) in the northern part of Yongjing County (between Liujiaxia and Yanguoxia) in 2001. The local traditional folk sing huaer is called the soul of northwest or the encyclopedia of northwest (it usually refers to five provinces in northwestern China). There are numerous mosques and temples throughout the rest of Linxia. Beautiful mountain scenery can be found at Taizi Mountain Nature Reserve, which stretches along the prefecture's southern border.

In 2002 these sites and others drew 400,000 tourists, up 20%, who added a total 110,000,000 RMB, up 50%, to the local economy.

Linxia is also a stop on trips from Lanzhou to towns in the Tibetan parts of southern Gansu including the famed Labrang Monastery in Xiahe.

== News ==
On September 6, 2006 it was reported that 879 or more villagers from the Xinsi and Maba villages had been poisoned by lead from a local smelter.
