= Zhang County =

Zhang County 漳县
- County
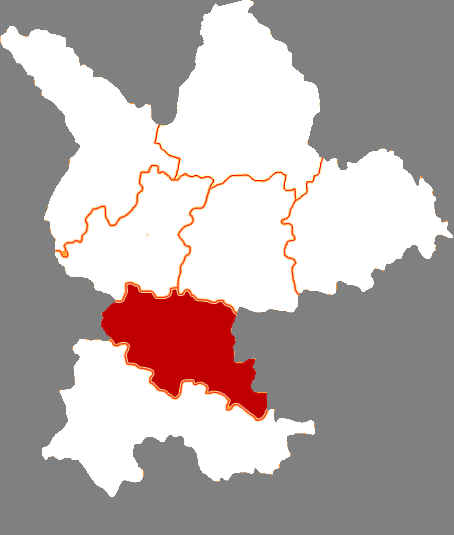
- Zhang County in Dingxi

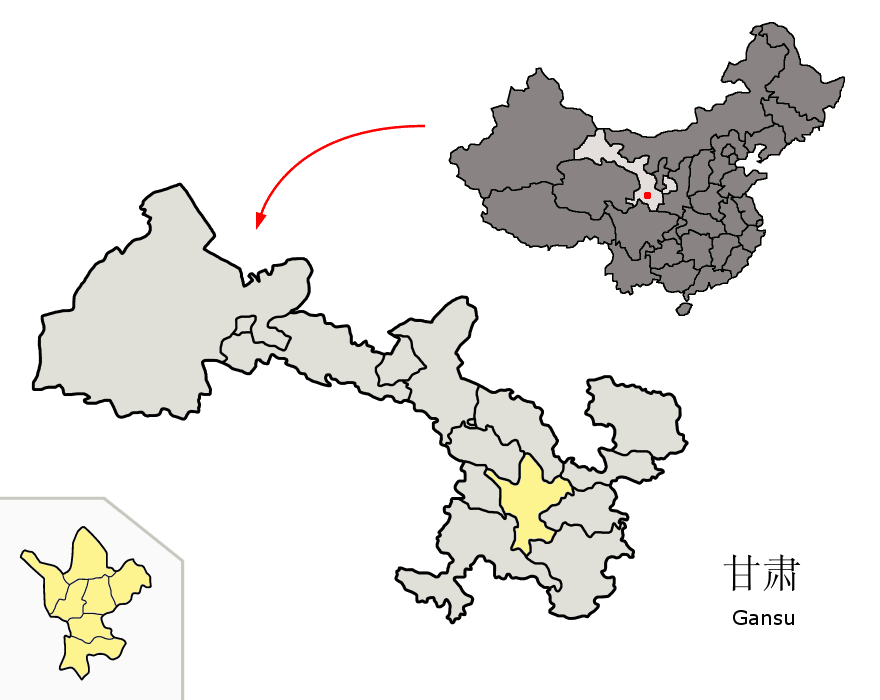
- Dingxi in Gansu
- Coordinates: 34°50′54″N 104°28′18″E
- Country: China
- Province: Gansu
- Prefecture-level city: Dingxi
- County seat: Wuyang

Area
  - Land: 2,164.4 km^{2} (835.7 sq mi)

Population (2017)
  - Total: 198,200
  - Density: 91.57/km^{2} (237.2/sq mi)
- Time zone: UTC+8 (China Standard)
- Postal code: 748300

Zhang County or Zhangxian is a county in Gansu province, China. It is under the administration of the prefecture-level city of Dingxi. Its postal code is 748300, and its population in 2017 was 198,200 people.

The county has several mineral resources such as rock salt, limestone and andalusite.

== Administrative divisions ==
Zhang County is divided into 10 towns and 3 townships.

Towns

- Wuyang (武阳镇)
- Sancha (三岔镇)
- Xinsi (新寺镇)
- Jinzhong (金钟镇)
- Yanjing (盐井镇)
- Panhuqiao (殪虎桥镇)
- Dacaotan (大草滩镇)
- Sizu (四族镇)
- Shichuan (石川镇)
- Guiqingshan (贵清山镇)

Townships

- Maquan Township (马泉乡)
- Wudang Township (武当乡)
- Dongquan Township (东泉乡)

== Climate ==
Climate data for Zhangxian, elevation 1,911 m (6,270 ft), (1991–2020 normals, extremes 1981–present)
| Month | Jan | Feb | Mar | Apr | May | Jun | Jul | Aug | Sep | Oct | Nov | Dec | Year |
|---|---|---|---|---|---|---|---|---|---|---|---|---|---|
| Record high °C (°F) | 14.4 (57.9) | 21.7 (71.1) | 25.7 (78.3) | 28.7 (83.7) | 30.6 (87.1) | 32.1 (89.8) | 35.1 (95.2) | 34.2 (93.6) | 32.1 (89.8) | 25.4 (77.7) | 20.1 (68.2) | 16.7 (62.1) | 35.1 (95.2) |
| Mean daily maximum °C (°F) | 1.9 (35.4) | 5.1 (41.2) | 10.9 (51.6) | 17.1 (62.8) | 20.8 (69.4) | 24.1 (75.4) | 26.4 (79.5) | 25.3 (77.5) | 20.0 (68.0) | 14.5 (58.1) | 9.0 (48.2) | 3.8 (38.8) | 14.9 (58.8) |
| Daily mean °C (°F) | −5.1 (22.8) | −1.3 (29.7) | 4.0 (39.2) | 9.8 (49.6) | 13.8 (56.8) | 17.5 (63.5) | 19.7 (67.5) | 18.9 (66.0) | 14.3 (57.7) | 8.5 (47.3) | 2.2 (36.0) | −3.5 (25.7) | 8.2 (46.8) |
| Mean daily minimum °C (°F) | −10.2 (13.6) | −6.3 (20.7) | −1.2 (29.8) | 3.6 (38.5) | 7.5 (45.5) | 11.3 (52.3) | 13.8 (56.8) | 13.5 (56.3) | 9.9 (49.8) | 4.2 (39.6) | −2.6 (27.3) | −8.4 (16.9) | 2.9 (37.3) |
| Record low °C (°F) | −22.2 (−8.0) | −19.9 (−3.8) | −13.7 (7.3) | −7.3 (18.9) | −2.8 (27.0) | 2.1 (35.8) | 5.7 (42.3) | 4.8 (40.6) | 0.7 (33.3) | −9.0 (15.8) | −16.5 (2.3) | −22.3 (−8.1) | −22.3 (−8.1) |
| Average precipitation mm (inches) | 4.7 (0.19) | 6.2 (0.24) | 14.1 (0.56) | 30.7 (1.21) | 55.6 (2.19) | 64.3 (2.53) | 80.7 (3.18) | 75.6 (2.98) | 54.2 (2.13) | 34.9 (1.37) | 7.0 (0.28) | 1.6 (0.06) | 429.6 (16.92) |
| Average precipitation days (≥ 0.1 mm) | 5.1 | 5.4 | 7.7 | 9.1 | 11.9 | 12.8 | 12.6 | 12.4 | 13.5 | 10.4 | 4.4 | 2.5 | 107.8 |
| Average snowy days | 8.6 | 8.2 | 7.4 | 2.3 | 0.2 | 0 | 0 | 0 | 0 | 1.4 | 4.4 | 5.2 | 37.7 |
| Average relative humidity (%) | 61 | 61 | 59 | 58 | 61 | 65 | 68 | 71 | 76 | 75 | 69 | 62 | 66 |
| Mean monthly sunshine hours | 182.7 | 167.5 | 188.4 | 206.4 | 220.0 | 210.4 | 221.2 | 210.4 | 147.6 | 150.8 | 171.7 | 190.1 | 2,267.2 |
| Percentage possible sunshine | 58 | 54 | 50 | 52 | 51 | 49 | 51 | 51 | 40 | 44 | 56 | 63 | 52 |
Source: China Meteorological Administration

== See also ==
- List of administrative divisions of Gansu
