= Daxia River =

River in China

Coordinates: 35.7455°N 103.207°E

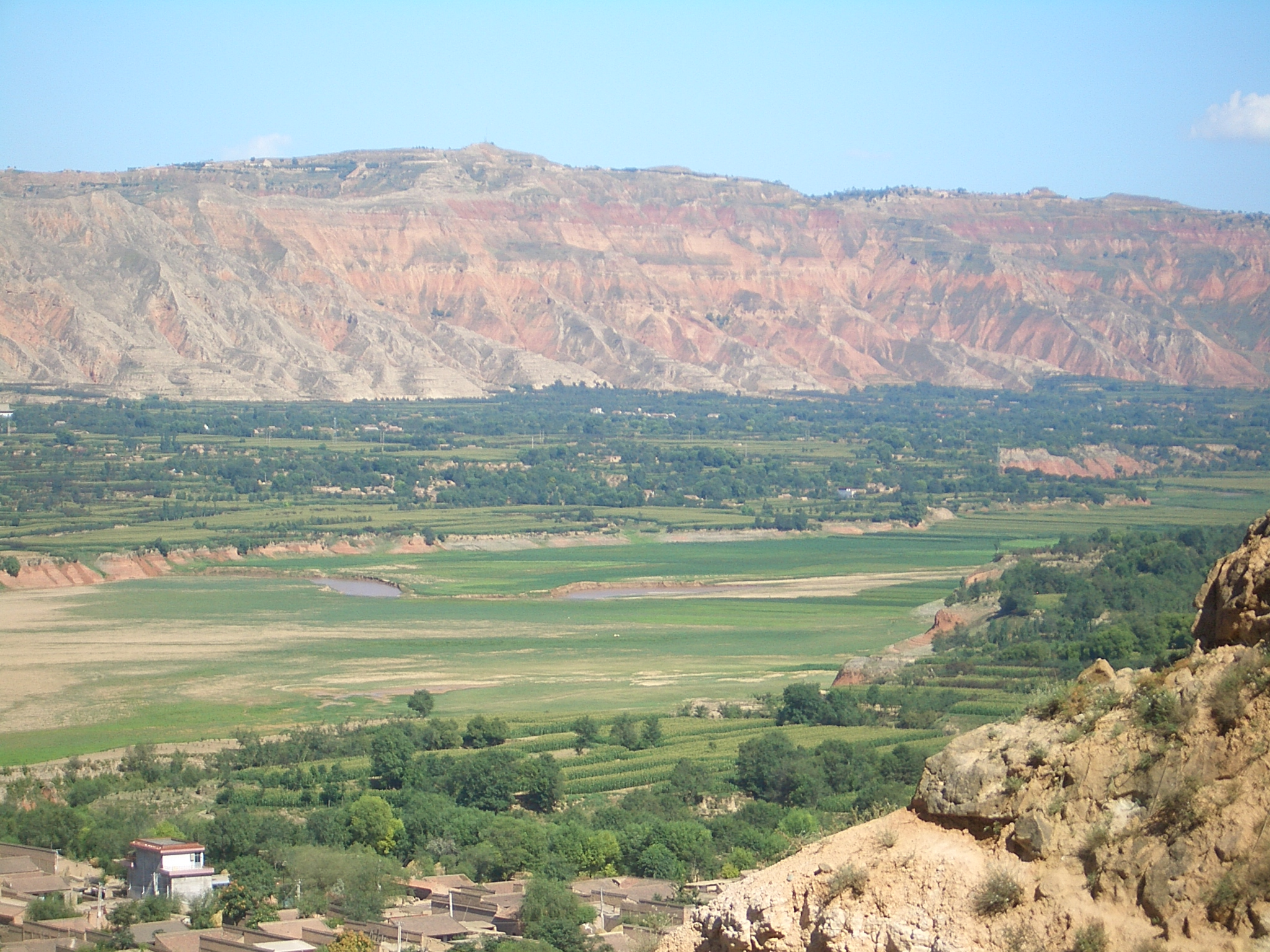
Daxia River valley within a few km from its fall into the Liujiaxia Reservoir. The near side of the river is in Linxia County, and the far side in Dongxiang Autonomous County

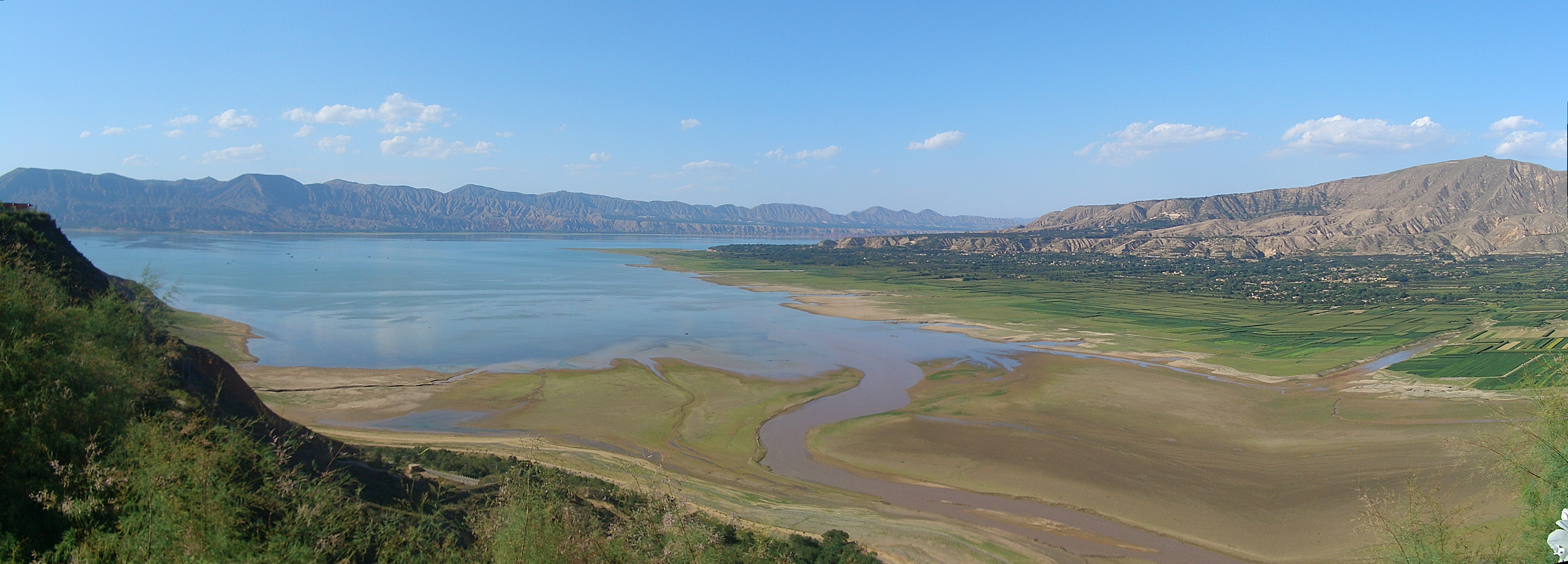
Daxia River falling into the Liujiaxia Reservoir

The Daxia River (Chinese: 大夏河; pinyin: Dàxià hé) or Sangchu (Tibetan: བསང་ཆུ, Wylie: bsang chu) is a tributary of the Yellow River in southern Gansu province in China's west.

The Daxia River starts in eastern Huangnan Tibetan Autonomous Prefecture in Qinghai, then flows easterly through northern Gannan Tibetan Autonomous Prefecture where its drainage basin covers large parts of Hezuo County-level City and Xiahe County. It then flows northeast into Linxia Hui Autonomous Prefecture, where it is crosses the breadth of Linxia County, and Linxia City. Its lower course forms the border between Linxia County and the neighbouring Dongxiang Autonomous County to the east. The river forms a large bay at its mouth in the Liujiaxia Reservoir.

Within Linxia Hui Autonomous Prefecture, the wide valley of Daxia River, flanked on both sides by loess plateaus, is a major agricultural and residential area. Both Hanji town (the county seat of Linxia County) and Linxia City are located in this valley.
