= Bingling Temple =

Bingling Cave–Temple Complex
UNESCO World Heritage Site
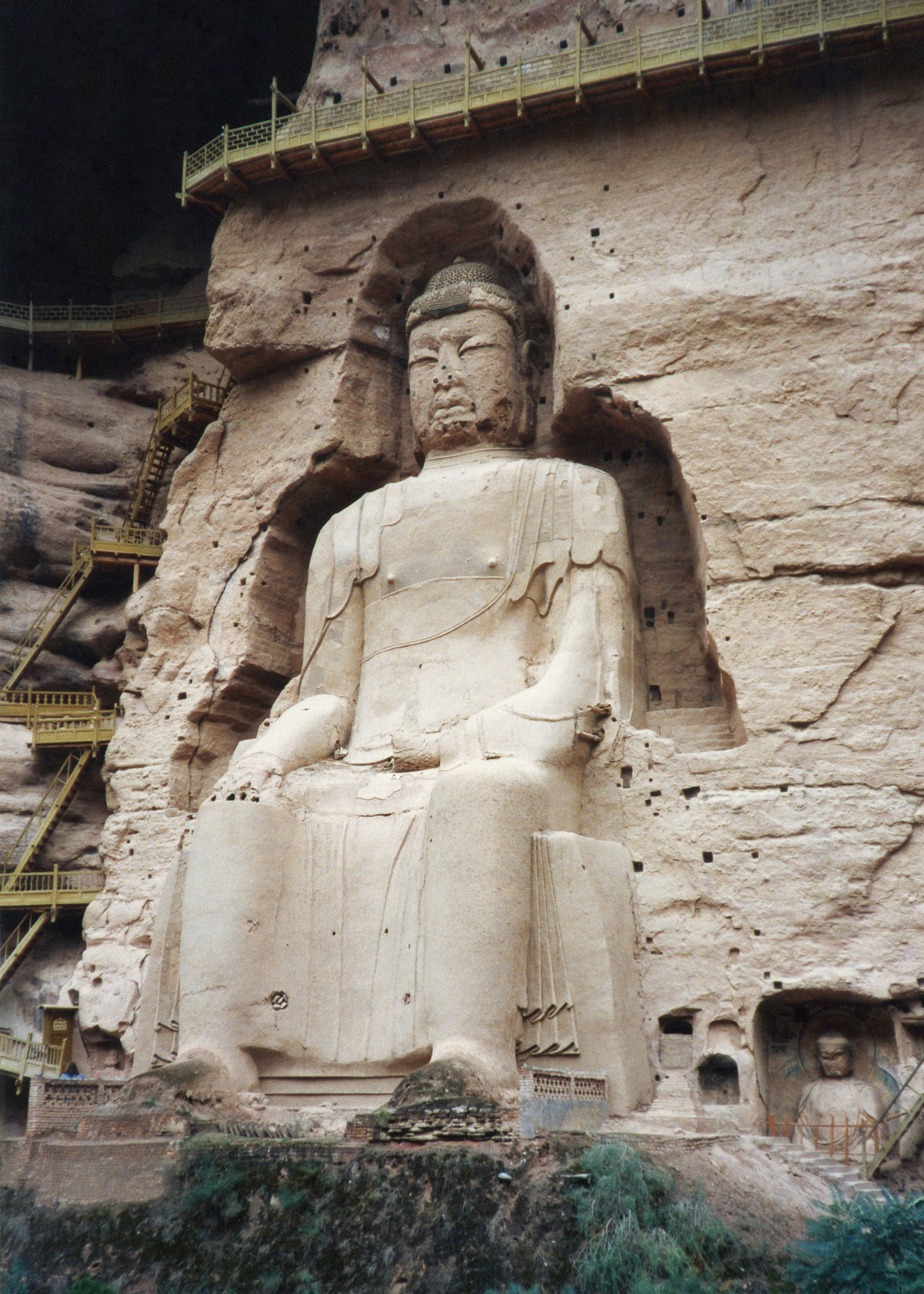
- The Great Maitreya Buddha

- Location within China
- Location: Yongjing County, Linxia Hui Autonomous Prefecture, Gansu, China
- Part of: Silk Roads: the Routes Network of Chang'an-Tianshan Corridor
- Criteria: Cultural: ii, iii, iv, vi
- Reference: 1442-027
- Inscription: 2014 (38th Session)
- Area: 132.62 ha (0.5120 sq mi)
- Buffer zone: 2,044.37 ha (7.8934 sq mi)
- Coordinates: 35°48′38″N 103°02′54″E

The Bingling Temple (simplified Chinese: 炳灵寺; traditional Chinese: 炳靈寺; pinyin: Bǐnglíng Sì) is a series of grottoes filled with Buddhist sculpture carved into natural caves and caverns in a canyon along the Yellow River. It lies just north of where the Yellow River empties into the Liujiaxia Reservoir. Administratively, the site is in Yongjing County of Linxia Hui Autonomous Prefecture in Gansu province, some 100 km (62 mi) southwest of Lanzhou. This temple, along with other sites along the Silk Road, was inscribed in 2014 on the UNESCO World Heritage List as the Silk Roads: the Routes Network of Chang'an-Tianshan Corridor World Heritage Site.

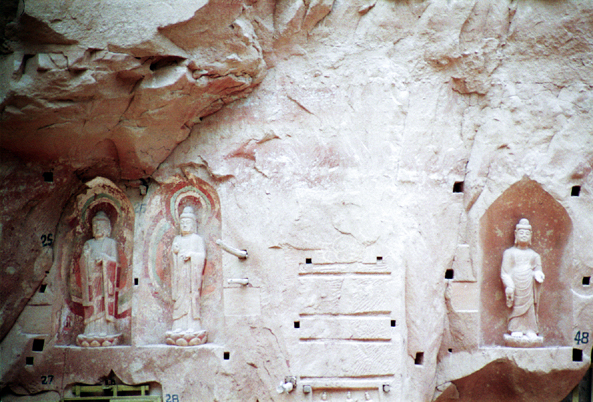
Smaller relief images

The caves were a work in progress for more than a millennium. The first grotto was begun around 420 CE during the Western Qin dynasty. Work continued and more grottoes were added during the Wei, Sui, Tang, Song, Yuan, Ming, and Qing dynasties. The style of each grotto can easily be connected to the typical artwork from its corresponding dynasty. The Bingling Temple is both stylistically and geographically a midpoint between the monumental Buddhas of Bamiyan in Afghanistan and the Buddhist Grottoes of central China, Yungang Grottoes near Datong and Longmen Grottoes near Luoyang.

Over the centuries, earthquakes, erosion, and looters have damaged or destroyed many of the caves and the artistic treasures within. Altogether there are 183 caves, 694 stone statues, and 82 clay sculptures that remain. The relief sculpture and caves filled with buddhas and frescoes line the northern side of the canyon for about 200 meters. Each cave is like a miniature temple filled with Buddhist imagery. These caves culminate at a large natural cavern where wooden walkways precariously wind up the rock face to hidden cliff-side caves and the giant Maitreya Buddha that stands more than 27 meters, or almost 100 feet, tall.

== Tourism ==
The sculptures, carvings, and frescoes that remain are outstanding examples of Buddhist artwork and draw visitors from around the world. The site is extremely remote and can only be reached during summer and fall by boat via the Liujiaxia Reservoir. Boats leave from near the Liujiaxia Dam in Liujiaxia City (Yongjing County's county seat), and sometimes also from other docks on the reservoir. The rest of the year, the site is inaccessible, as there are few roads in the area. From central Lanzhou it takes 2.5 hours to reach Bingling Temple by car through very winding roads.

== See also ==
- Buddhist art
- History of Buddhism
- List of colossal sculpture in situ
