= Wuyang, Zhang County =

Wuyang 武阳镇
- Town
- Interactive map of Wuyang
- Country: China
- Province: Gansu
- Prefecture-level city: Dingxi
- County: Zhang

Area
  - Town: 115.6 km^{2} (44.6 sq mi)
- Highest elevation: 2,672 m (8,766 ft)
- Lowest elevation: 1,735 m (5,692 ft)

Population (2014)
  - Town: 27,739
  - Rural: 16,847

Wuyang is a town of Zhang County, Gansu, China. It is also the county seat of Zhang County, and is located along the Zhang River. It was established in 1949 as Chengguan town. In 2003 it was merged with Mulin township (木林乡) and renamed to Wuyang. This name originates from the Tang dynasty name of Zhang County.

In 2014 the population of Wuyang was 27,739, including 16,847 rural residents.

== Administrative divisions ==
Wuyang has jurisdiction over 12 villages and 2 residential communities.

Villages

- Chengguan (城关)
- Dongjiazhuang (董家庄)
- Xinzhuangmen (新庄门)
- Kezhai (柯寨)
- Kongjiaxia (孙家峡)
- Wangjiahe (王家河)
- Linjiawan (蔺家湾)
- Wangjiahe (汪家河)
- Pangjiawan (庞家湾)
- Hejiashan (何家山)
- Hujiawa (胡家屲)
- Baojiashan (包家山)

Residential communities

- Chengdong (城东)
- Chengxi (城西)
