= Liujiaxia Dam =

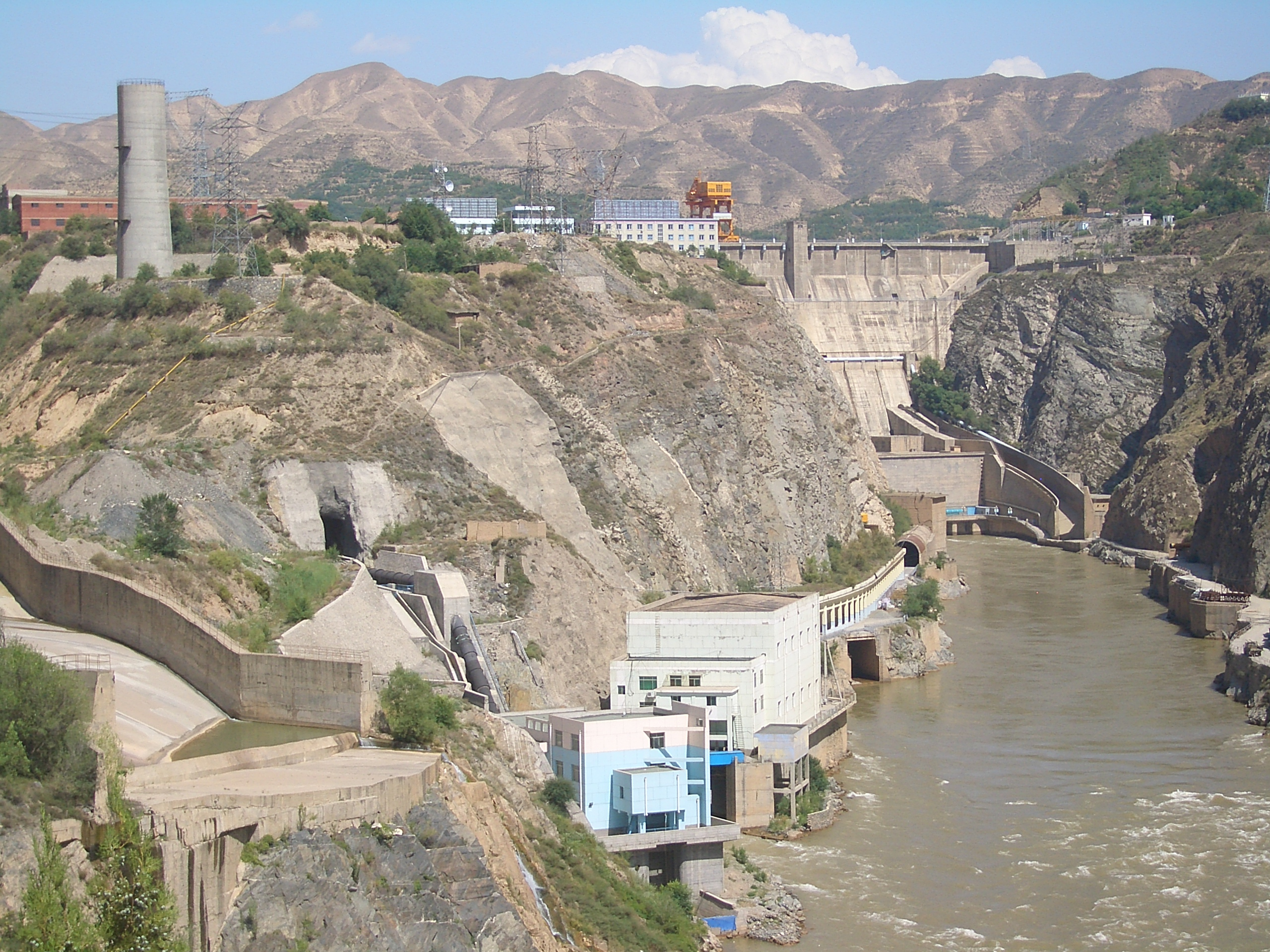
- Interactive map of Liujiaxia Dam
- Official name: 刘家峡大坝
- Coordinates: 35°56′02″N 103°20′34″E
- Construction began: 1958
- Opening date: 1969

Dam and spillways
- Type of dam: Gravity dam
- Impounds: Yellow River
- Height: 147 m (482 ft)
- Length: 840 m (2,756 ft)
- Width (base): 16 m (52 ft)

Reservoir
- Creates: Liujiaxia Reservoir
- Total capacity: 4.24 km^{3} (1 mi^{3})

Power Station
- Turbines: 3 × 225MW,1 × 250MW,1 × 300MW
- Installed capacity: 1,225 MW

The Liujiaxia Dam (Chinese: 刘家峡大坝; pinyin: Liújiāxiá Dàbà) is a major hydroelectric dam on the upper Yellow River, in Linxia Hui Autonomous Prefecture of China's Gansu Province. The dam and its hydroelectric facility (Liujiaxia Hydroelectric Station, Chinese: 刘家峡水电站; pinyin: Liújiāxiá Shuǐdiàn Zhàn) are located in Liujia Gorge, or Liujiaxia (lit. 'Liu Family's Gorge'), just downstream from where the Tao River flows into the Yellow River. The site is on the eastern outskirts of Liujiaxia Town. Since Liujiaxia Town is the county seat of Yongjing County, it is often marked on less detailed maps simply as "Yongjing".

The Liujiaxia Reservoir (Chinese: 刘家峡水库; pinyin: Liújiāxiá Shuǐkù) formed by the dam is the largest body of water within Gansu. The primary purpose of the dam is generating electricity; in addition, it is used for flood control, irrigation, and "ice flood prevention". The dam's location is about 70 km (43 mi) west-south-west (or 100 km (62 mi) upstream) from the provincial capital Lanzhou.

Liujiaxia Dam is a concrete gravity dam 147 m (482 ft) high and 16 m (52 ft) wide on top. The main section of the dam is 204 m (669 ft) long; including auxiliary sections on both sides, the length totals 840 m (2,756 ft).

The power plant has 5 generators with the total installed capacity of 1,225 MW. When it became fully operational in 1974, it became the country's largest hydroelectric power plant, and remained so until the 1980s.

== History ==
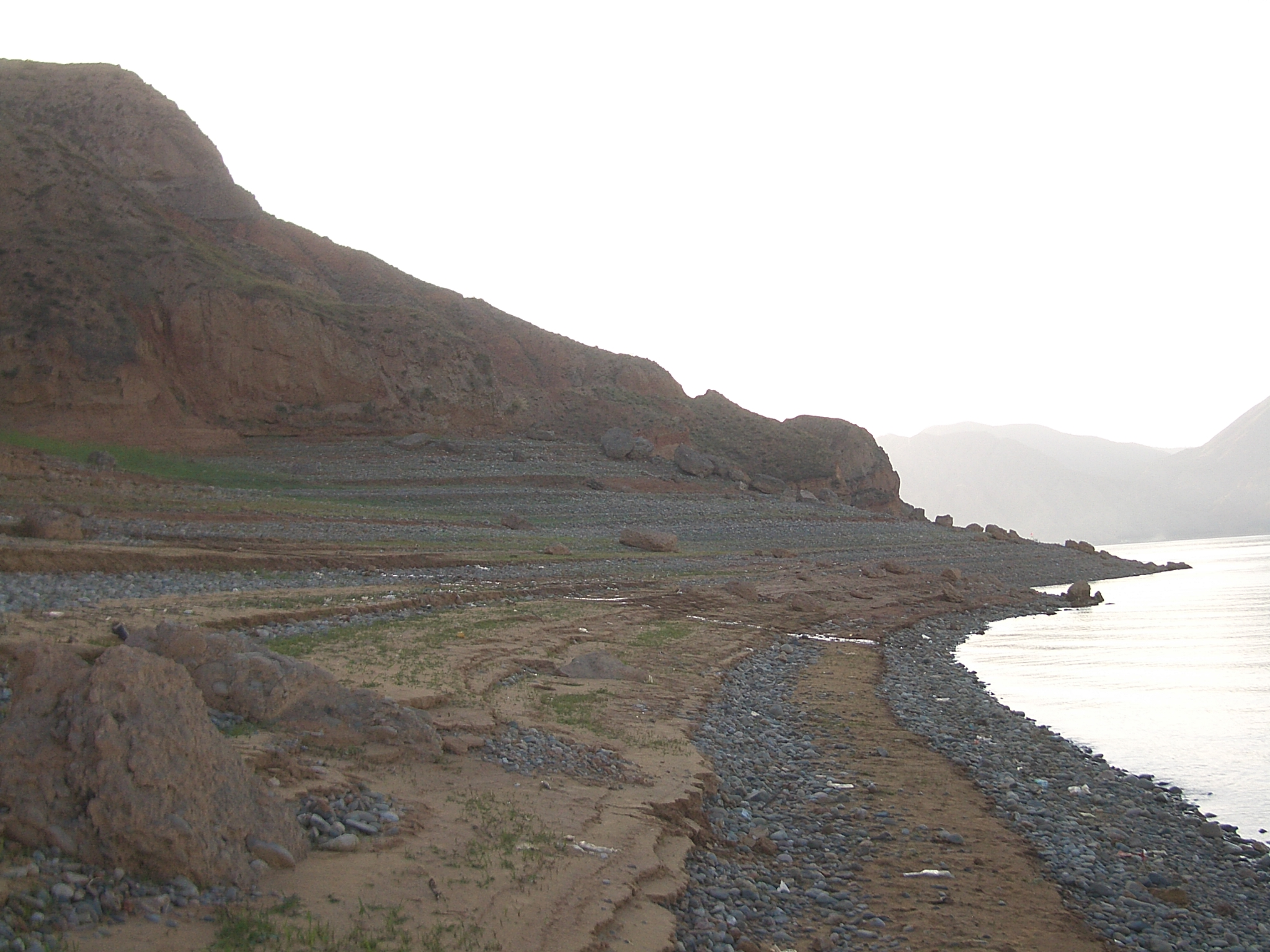
The effect of varying water level can be seen on the shoreline. Daxia River, south of Lianhua Tai.

In 1955, just a few years after the creation of the People's Republic of China, the Communist government announced a large-scale program of hydroelectric dam construction on the Yellow River. According to the plan, a dam was to be built in each of the Three Gorges of the Yellow River: Liujia Gorge, Yanguo Gorge, and Bapan Gorge. The detailed geological investigation of the area, to choose the most suitable site for the dams, started immediately.

In 1958, construction work started on the first two dams, both located in Linxia Hui Autonomous Prefecture's Yongjing County: the 57-meter high Yanguoxia Dam (in Yangou Gorge, downstream from Liujiaxia) and the 147-meter-high Liujiaxia Dam in Liujia Gorge. While the smaller Yanguoxia Dam was completed in 1961, the work on Liujiaxia Dam itself was suspended in 1961-63, and the dam itself was only completed in 1969. The five generators were brought into service, one after another, between 1969 and 1974.

Hu Jintao, then a young engineer, joined the project's staff in 1968. Guo Moruo visited the site in 1971 and wrote a poem on the occasion.

The reservoirs created by the three-dam cascade (also including Bapanxia Dam (1968-1975) farther downstream) displaced numerous local farmers. The three reservoirs flooded 118,229 (7,881 hectares) of farmland and displaced 43,829 residents, primarily in Yongjing County. The compensation payments to the farmers affected by the Liujiaxia Dams reportedly averaged 364 yuan per person (but in reality may have been even lower), and were grossly inadequate. It is said that the residents received lower compensation amount than they could otherwise because in 1958, during the Great Leap Forward, when the Yanguoxia project started, they understated the value of their assets, as they were afraid to be classified as "rich peasants", i.e. class enemies.

== See also ==
- List of power stations in China
