= Yongjing County =

Yongjing County 永靖县
- County
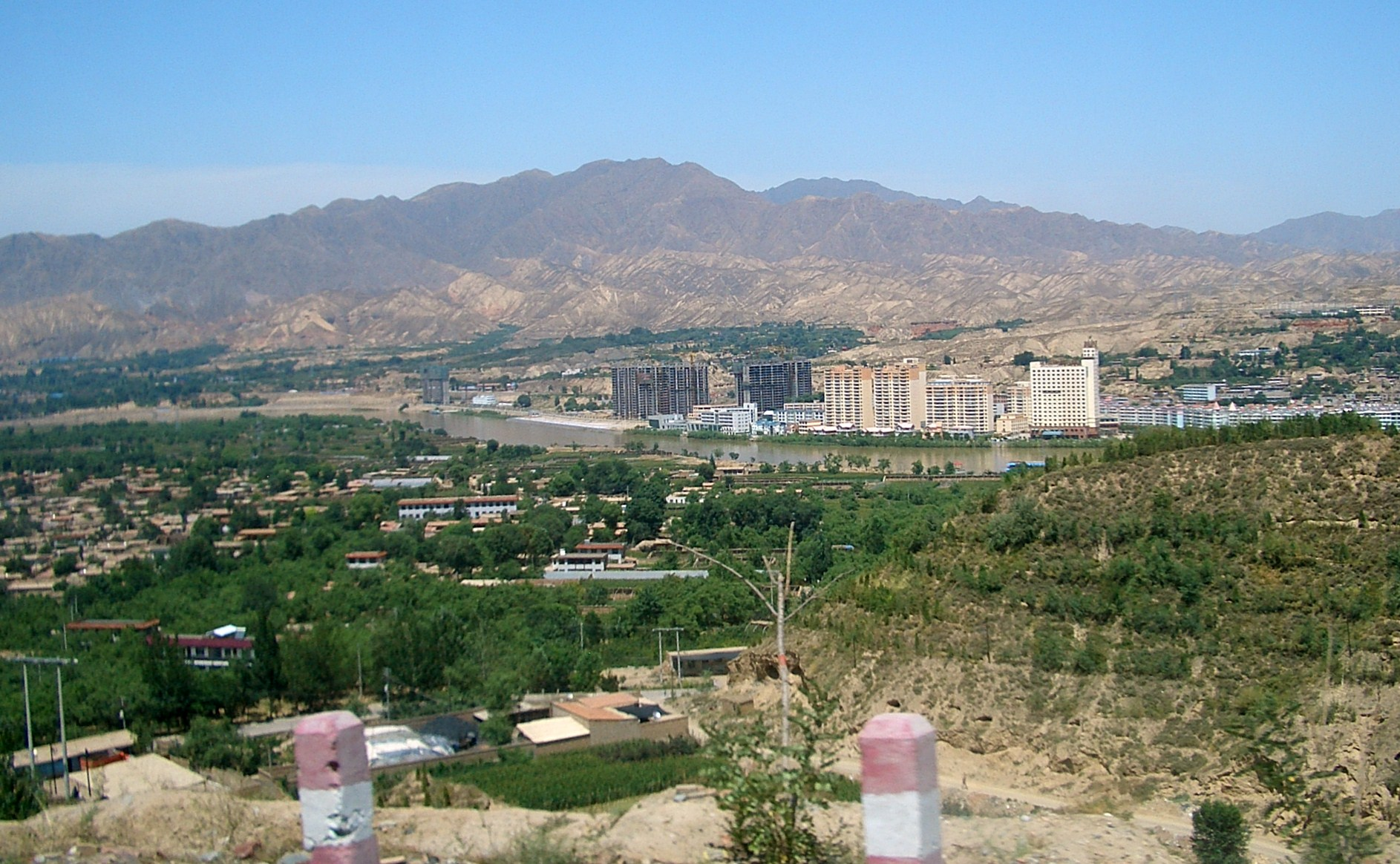
- Town of Liujiaxia

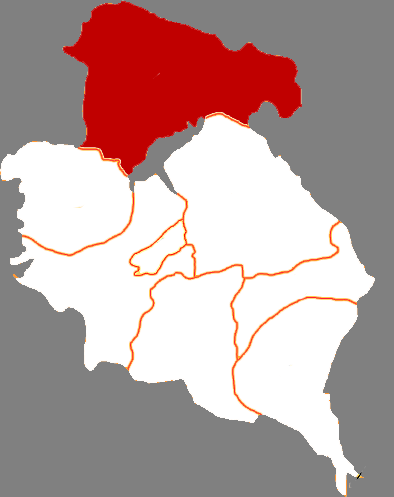
- Yongjing in Linxia

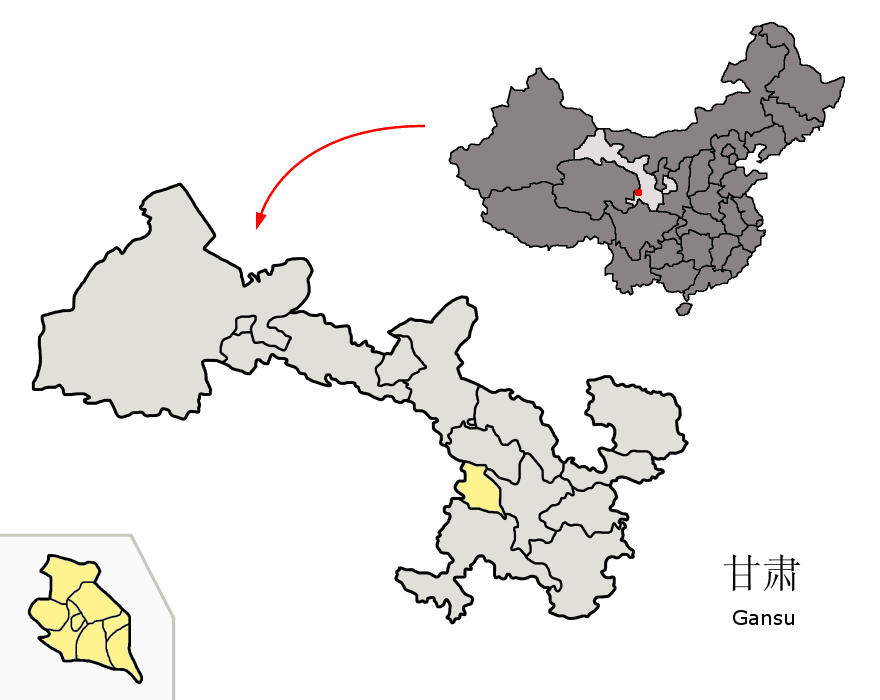
- Linxia in Gansu

- Location in Gansu Location in China
- Coordinates (Yongjing County government): 35°57′30″N 103°17′09″E
- Country: China
- Province: Gansu
- Autonomous prefecture: Linxia
- County seat: Liujiaxia

Area
  - Total: 1,863.6 km^{2} (719.5 sq mi)

Population (2020)
  - Total: 180,650
  - Density: 96.936/km^{2} (251.06/sq mi)
- Time zone: UTC+8 (China Standard)
- Postal code: 731600
- Website: www.gsyongjing.gov.cn

Yongjing (simplified Chinese: 永靖县; traditional Chinese: 永靖縣; pinyin: Yǒngjìng Xiàn; Wade–Giles: Yung-ching Hsien, Xiao'erjing: ﻳْﻮ دٍ ﺷِﯿًﺎْ) is a county in Linxia Hui Autonomous Prefecture in China's Gansu Province. The county seat, the town (zhen) of Liujiaxia (刘家峡; 劉家峽; Liújiāxiá; Liu-chia-hsia), is located about 80 km south-west from the provincial capital city, Lanzhou. As is the case with most Chinese county seats, Liujiaxia Town is labeled on most less-detailed maps simply as "Yongjing" or "Yongjing County".

The Liujiaxia Dam on the Yellow River is located on the eastern outskirts of Liujiaxia Town.

== History ==
Yongjing's history goes back approximately 5,000 years. It was part of the ancient Western Qiang state. In the Han Dynasty it was part of Jincheng (金城) or Gold City. For many dynasties after that, it was part of Hezhou (河州). Not until 1928 did it become part of Linxia (临夏).

== Administrative divisions ==
Yongjing County is divided to 10 towns and 7 townships.

Towns

- Liujiaxia (刘家峡镇)
- Yanguoxia (盐锅峡镇)
- Taiji (太极镇)
- Xihe (西河镇)
- Sanyuan (三塬镇)
- Xianyuan (岘塬镇)
- Chenjing (陈井镇)
- Sichuan (川城镇)
- Wangtai (王台镇)
- Hongquan (红泉镇)

Townships

- Guanshan Township (关山乡)
- Xuding Township (徐顶乡)
- Santiaoxian Township (三条岘乡)
- Pinggou Township (坪沟乡)
- Xinsi Township (新寺乡)
- Xiaoling Township (小岭乡)
- Yangta Township (杨塔乡)

== Geography ==
Yongjing is located in center western Gansu province along the Yellow River, north of the Liujiaxia Reservoir, or Bingling Lake. Yongjing County's area covers more than 1,863 km^{2}. It is mountainous and hilly with elevations between 1560 and 2851 m above sea-level and is located between 35°47'-36°12'N and 102°53'-103°39'E.

== Climate ==
Climate data for Yongjing, elevation 1,648 m (5,407 ft), (1991–2020 normals, extremes 1981–2010)
Month	Jan	Feb	Mar	Apr	May	Jun	Jul	Aug	Sep	Oct	Nov	Dec	Year
Record high °C (°F)	14.7 (58.5)	21.2 (70.2)	30.2 (86.4)	33.3 (91.9)	33.9 (93.0)	36.8 (98.2)	40.7 (105.3)	36.5 (97.7)	33.6 (92.5)	27.8 (82.0)	22.3 (72.1)	15.6 (60.1)	40.7 (105.3)
Mean daily maximum °C (°F)	3.1 (37.6)	7.5 (45.5)	13.8 (56.8)	20.3 (68.5)	24.3 (75.7)	27.6 (81.7)	29.4 (84.9)	28.0 (82.4)	22.9 (73.2)	17.3 (63.1)	10.9 (51.6)	4.4 (39.9)	17.5 (63.4)
Daily mean °C (°F)	−4.6 (23.7)	−0.2 (31.6)	6.1 (43.0)	12.4 (54.3)	16.7 (62.1)	20.3 (68.5)	22.1 (71.8)	20.8 (69.4)	16.0 (60.8)	9.9 (49.8)	2.8 (37.0)	−3.3 (26.1)	9.9 (49.8)
Mean daily minimum °C (°F)	−9.9 (14.2)	−5.9 (21.4)	0.0 (32.0)	5.6 (42.1)	9.9 (49.8)	14.0 (57.2)	16.2 (61.2)	15.3 (59.5)	11.2 (52.2)	4.8 (40.6)	−2.5 (27.5)	−8.4 (16.9)	4.2 (39.6)
Record low °C (°F)	−20.1 (−4.2)	−16.8 (1.8)	−12.7 (9.1)	−4.9 (23.2)	−0.3 (31.5)	6.3 (43.3)	8.1 (46.6)	6.6 (43.9)	1.8 (35.2)	−6.4 (20.5)	−12.1 (10.2)	−17.8 (0.0)	−20.1 (−4.2)
Average precipitation mm (inches)	0.9 (0.04)	1.1 (0.04)	3.6 (0.14)	18.4 (0.72)	34.4 (1.35)	39.7 (1.56)	66.2 (2.61)	63.0 (2.48)	38.7 (1.52)	18.2 (0.72)	1.5 (0.06)	0.4 (0.02)	286.1 (11.26)
Average precipitation days (≥ 0.1 mm)	1.7	1.9	3.1	5.5	8.9	10.9	12.1	11.3	11.2	7.6	1.6	0.8	76.6
Average snowy days	4.2	4.5	4.1	0.9	0.1	0	0	0	0	1.0	2.6	2.6	20
Average relative humidity (%)	55	50	45	44	51	57	63	68	73	69	62	59	58
Mean monthly sunshine hours	172.4	179.2	205.9	224.6	238.0	227.5	233.3	221.7	171.8	176.8	177.6	178.7	2,407.5
Percentage possible sunshine	55	58	55	57	54	52	53	54	47	51	58	59	54
Source: China Meteorological Administration

== Economy ==
Yongjing's economy is based mainly on the Yellow River and the hydropower it and its tributaries provide. The 3 local dams are Liujiaxia (located just upstream from the county seat), Yanguoxia (盐锅峡; upstream from Yanguoxia Town, further north), and Bapanxia (actually located within the Lanzhou prefecture, but with much of its reservoir being in Yongjing County).

With beautiful natural scenery and the famous Bingling Temple nearby, tourism is growing. Agriculture, mining, fishing, and other natural resource related industries are also important.

== Transport ==
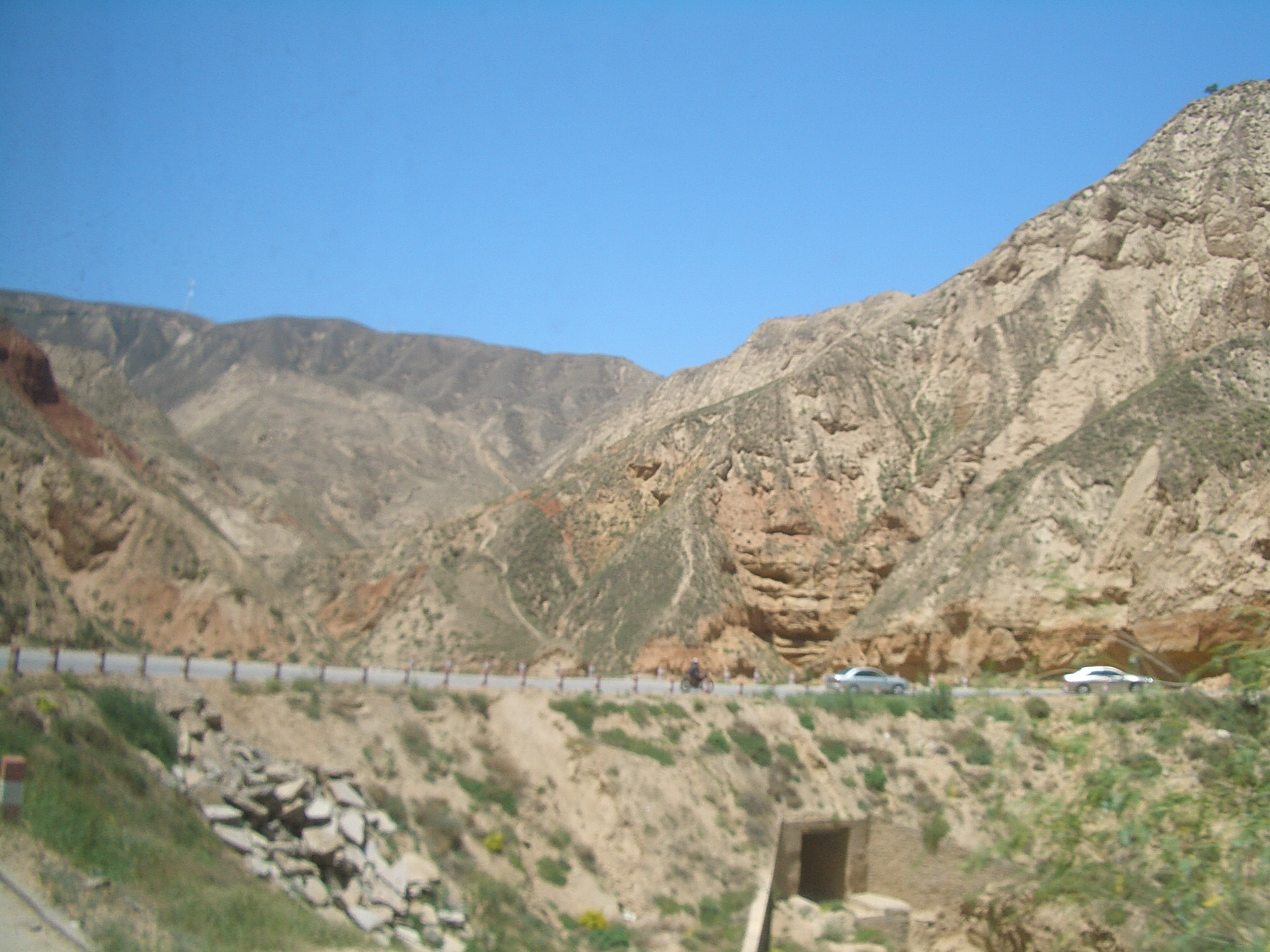
Typical local terrain

- China National Highway 213

== Tourism ==
Bingling Temple is located in the southern part of Yongjing County, a 3-hour boat ride away (upstream) from Liujiaxia Dam. Most boats start from just next to the dam, although some private boats also take tourists to the temple from the Lianhua Tai ferry dock on the southern (Linxia County) side of the Liujiaxia Reservoir. In order to improve foreign tourism, the local government has introduced foreign teachers to improve the English of the locality and social awareness of foreigners.

In 2001 archaeologists discovered more than 100 dinosaur tracks on a hillside near Yangouxia Gorge, and a dinosaur themed park was built but closed down in 2010.
