= Xinsi =

Xinsi 新寺镇
- Town
- Location within Gansu Location within China
- Coordinates: 34.6503°N 104.63019°E
- Country: China
- Province: Gansu
- Prefecture-level city: Dingxi
- County: Zhang

Population
  - Total: 21,277

Xinsi is a town of Zhang County, Gansu, China. It was established in 1528 as a subdivision of Minzhou. Historically it was also known as Machenglongchuan (马成龙川) or Maxunchuan (马驯川). The name Xinsi refers to a temple that was built near the town.

As of 2019 it has a population of 21,277 and has jurisdiction over 10 villages and 1 residential community.

The Longchuan River and Bangsha River flow through Xinsi.
