= Choni =

Choni may refer to:

- Chone Monastery, in Jonê County, western China
- Choni language, dialect of a Tibetic language spoken in western China
- Jonê County, in Gansu Province, western China
- Honi HaMe'agel, a.k.a. Choni, Jewish scholar of the 1st-century BC
- Xionites, a.k.a. Chionites, a nomadic people in Transoxania and Bactria in 1st-6th century AD
