= Langmusi =

Langmusi 郎木寺
- Town
- Langmusi, October 2023

- Location in China Langmusi (Gansu)
- Coordinates: 34°05′29″N 102°38′11″E
- Country: China
- Province: Gansu
- Prefecture: Gannan Tibetan Autonomous Prefecture
- County: Luqu County
- Named for: Langmu Temple
- Elevation: 3,325 m (10,909 ft)

Population
  - Total: 4,000
- Time zone: UTC+8 (China Standard)

Langmusi Town (Chinese: 郎木寺镇; pinyin: Lángmùsìzhèn; Tibetan: སྟག་ཚང་ལྷ་མོ་, ZWPY: Taktsang Lhamo) is a small alpine town on the eastern edge of the Tibetan Plateau, nestled in a valley shared between Gansu and Sichuan provinces in China and straddled by two large monastery complexes. Administratively, the town is part of Luqu County in Gannan Tibetan Autonomous Prefecture in Gansu, although a small portion of the town in the south is actually located in Zoigê County, Ngawa Tibetan and Qiang Autonomous Prefecture, Sichuan. The town is commonly visited by tourists making the overland trip between Sichuan and Gansu. Inhabitants of the town are primarily Tibetan.

== History ==
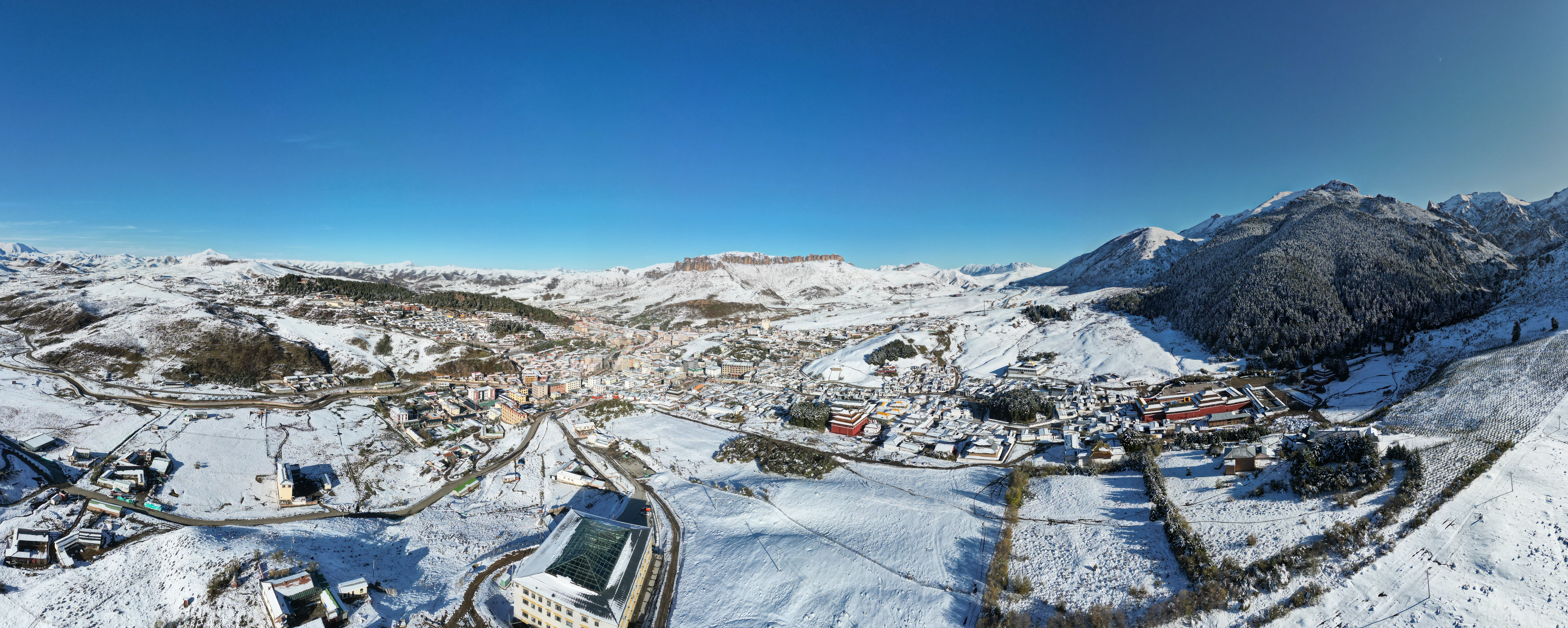
Aerial panorama of Langmusi. October 19, 2023.

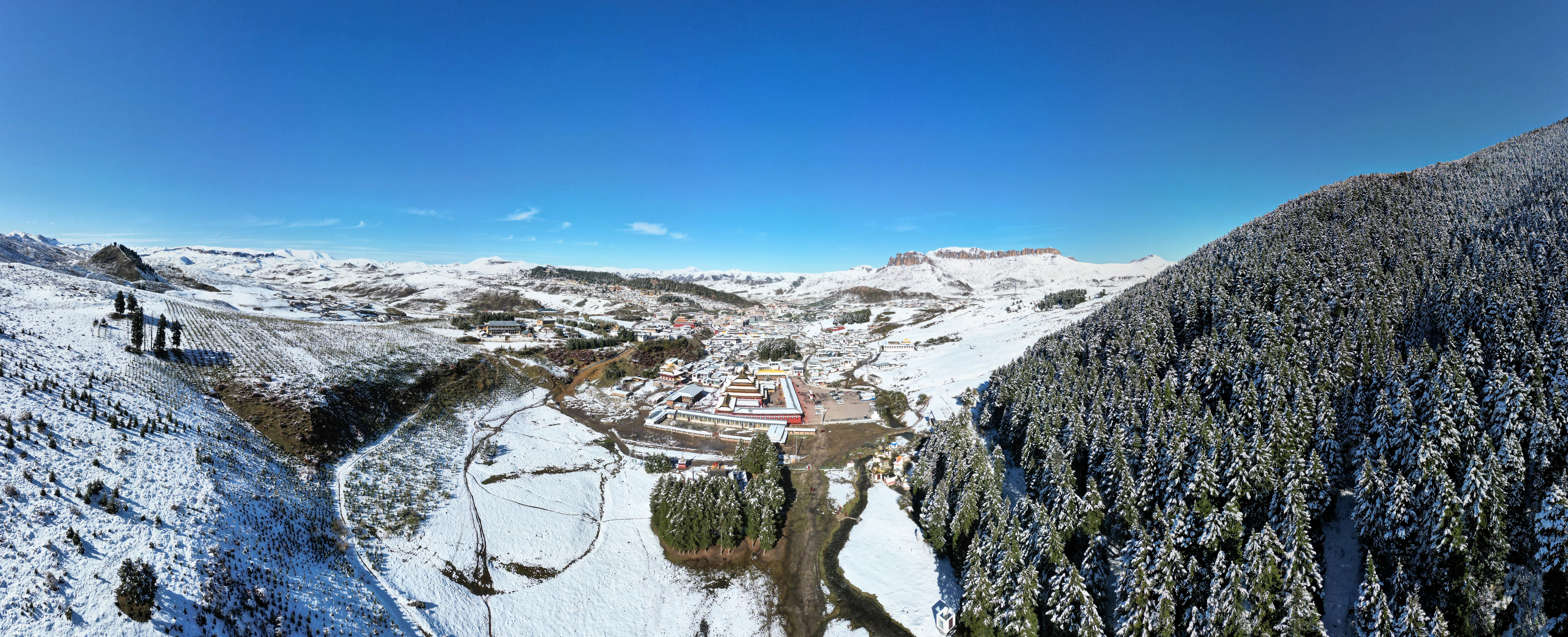
Aerial panorama of Langmusi as seen from its valley gorge. October 19, 2023.

The town emerged around the Tibetan Buddhist temple, Langmu Temple (Chinese: 郎木寺; pinyin: Lángmùsì) which was founded in 1748. At the time, Langmusi was located in the southern portion of the Amdo region of historical Tibet during Qing Dynasty rule.

== Geography ==
Langmusi is located at the headwaters of the Bailong River which eventually flows into the Yangtze at Chongqing. To the east of Langmusi are the Min Mountains which form the easternmost edge of the Tibetan Plateau. West of Langmusi are the Xiqing Mountains. The mountains directly south of Langmusi form the divide between the Yangtze and Yellow River basins. Beyond these mountains are the expansive Zoigê Wetlands which drain into the Yellow River.

== Tourism ==
Langmusi is a popular destination for domestic tourists and is accessible via Highway 213 which passes 3 km to the north of the town. The nearest airport is Gannan Xiahe Airport, 125 km north.

In the southern (Sichuan) portion of the town is the Kirti Monastery. The northern (Gansu) portion of the town is dominated by the Sertri Monastery. Both monasteries are popular with tourists but only the Kirti Monastery charges an admission fee. South of the Kirti Monastery is Namo Gorge and its caves which are common destinations for hiking. In the surrounding countryside, multi-day horseback riding trips are available to tourists that may overnight with Tibetan nomads.

== See also ==
- List of township-level divisions of Gansu
