= Jonê =

Jonê can refer to

- Jonê County, an administrative district in the Gannan Tibetan Autonomous Prefecture, Gansu Province, China
- Chone Monastery, a.k.a. Jonê Monastery, a major Tibetan Geluk monastery in Jonê County
