= Dayu, Gansu =

Dayu 大峪镇
- Town
- Location in Gansu
- Coordinates: 33°49′52″N 104°2′10″E
- Country: People's Republic of China
- Province: Gansu
- Autonomous prefecture: Gannan Tibetan Autonomous Prefecture
- County: Zhouqu County
- Time zone: UTC+8 (China Standard)

Dayu (Chinese: 大峪; pinyin: Dàyù, Tibetan: སྟག་ཡུལ, Wylie: stag yul, ZWPY: Dagyü) is a town under the administration of Zhouqu County, Gansu, China.

As of 2023, it administers the following seven villages:

- Daya Village (大崖村)
- Xianghang Village (香杭村)
- Daping Village (大坪村)
- Laodi Village (老地村)
- Duola Village (多拉村)
- Abu Village (阿布村)
- Deli Village (得力村)

== See also ==
- List of township-level divisions of Gansu
