= Amuquhu, Gansu =

Amuquhu 阿木去乎镇
- Town
- Amuquhuzhen
- Location in Gansu
- Coordinates: 34°48′42″N 102°41′16″E
- Country: People's Republic of China
- Province: Gansu
- Autonomous prefecture: Gannan Tibetan Autonomous Prefecture
- County: Xiahe County

Area
  - Total: 897.5 km^{2} (346.5 sq mi)

Population (2010)
  - Total: 12,623
  - Density: 14.06/km^{2} (36.43/sq mi)
- Time zone: UTC+8 (China Standard)
- Local dialing code: 941

Amuquhu (Chinese: 阿木去乎镇) is a town in Xiahe County, Gannan Tibetan Autonomous Prefecture, Gansu, China. In 2010, Amuquhu had a total population of 12,623: 3,032 males and 8,593 females: 3,032 aged under 14, 8,593 aged between 15 and 65 and 998 aged over 65.

== See also ==
- List of township-level divisions of Gansu
