= List of major power stations in Gansu =

This article lists the major power stations located in Gansu province.

== Non-renewable ==
=== Coal-based ===
Station	Name in Chinese	Coordinates	Capacity (MW)	Operational units	Under construction units
Changle Power Station	常乐电厂	40°39′21″N 96°29′55″E	6,000	6×1,000 MW	
Badanjilin Desert Power Station	巴丹吉林沙漠新能源基地调峰电源		4,000		4×1,000 MW
Zhangye Power Station	张掖电厂	39°04′16″N 100°27′44″E	2,600	2×300 MW, 2×1,000 MW	
Pingliang Power Station	平凉电厂	35°30′06″N 106°47′10″E	2,400	4×300 MW, 2×600 MW	
Jingyuan Power Station	靖远电厂	36°43′46″N 104°45′37″E	2,000	4×200 MW, 4×300 MW	
Zhengning Power Station	正宁电厂	35°16′09″N 107°58′34″E	2,000	2×1,000 MW	
Lingtai Power Station	灵台电厂	35°04′59″N 107°43′27″E	2,000	2×1,000 MW	
Jinchang Power Station	金昌调峰煤电项目	38°21′53″N 102°5′57″E	2,000		2×1,000 MW
Lanzhou New District Power Station	甘肃能化兰州新区火电	36°37′11″N 103°45′19″E	2,000		2×1,000 MW
Jiuquan Steel Power Station	酒钢自备电厂(嘉峪关宏晟电热)	39°47′46″N 98°18′26″E	1,550	2×125 MW, 2×300 MW, 2×350 MW	
Dongxing Aluminum Power Station	甘肃东兴铝业自备电厂	39°50′49″N 98°12′44″E	1,400	4×350 MW	
Jingtai Power Station	景泰电厂	37°13′52″N 104°10′04″E	1,320	2×660 MW	
Chongxin Power Station	崇信电厂	35°16′48″N 106°55′12″E	1,320	2×660 MW	
Xigu Power Station	西固热电厂	36°07′44″N 103°37′24″E	1,115	2×165 MW, 2×330 MW	
CHALCO Lanzhou Power Station	中国铝业兰州分公司自备电厂	36°09′25″N 103°20′03″E	900	3×300 MW	
Lanzhou Thermal Power Station	国电兰州热电厂	36°01′03″N 104°04′02″E	700	2×350 MW	
Baiyin Power Station	白银电厂	36°31′46″N 104°13′38″E	700	2×350 MW	
Wuwei Thermal Power Station	武威热电厂	37°54′03″N 102°41′09″E	700	2×350 MW	
Datang 803 Power Station	大唐八零三电厂	40°12′35″N 97°22′03″E	660	2×330 MW	
Lanzhou Fanping Thermal Power Station	华能兰州范坪热电厂	36°04′31″N 103°40′35″E	660	2×330 MW	
Jiuquan Power Station	酒泉热电厂	39°40′46″N 98°30′26″E	660	2×330 MW	
Jinchang 1st Power Station	甘肃电投金昌一电厂	38°22′29″N 102°05′57″E	660	2×330 MW	
Jinchang 2nd Power Station	甘肃电投金昌二电厂	38°30′06″N 102°16′18″E	660	2×330 MW	
Gangu Power Station	甘谷电厂	34°45′20″N 105°06′02″E	600	2×300 MW	
Liancheng Power Station	连城电厂	36°31′06″N 102°52′08″E	600	2×300 MW	
Jinchuan Group Power Station	金川集团自备电厂	38°29′27″N 102°10′06″E	300	2×150 MW	

== Renewable ==
=== Hydroelectric ===
==== Conventional ====
Station	Name in Chinese	Coordinates	River	Total capacity (MW)	Dam height (meters)	Status	Units
Dahejia Hydro Power Station	大河家水电站	35°50′14″N 102°45′00″E	Yellow River	142	46	Operational	4×35.5MW
Bingling Hydro Power Station	炳灵水电站	35°44′16″N 103°0′31″E	Yellow River	240	61	Operational	5×48 MW
Liujiaxia Hydro Power Station	刘家峡水电站	35°56′02″N 103°20′32″E	Yellow River	1,225	147	Operational	3×225 MW, 1×250 MW, 1×300 MW
Yanguoxia Hydro Power Station	盐锅峡水电站	36°03′31″N 103°16′21″E	Yellow River	471.2	57.2	Operational	8×46.4 MW, 2×50 MW
Bapanxia Hydro Power Station	八盘峡水电站	36°08′10″N 103°24′31″E	Yellow River	226.4	33	Operational	5×40MW, 1×26.4MW
Chaijiaxia Hydro Power Station	柴家峡水电站	36°07′15″N 103°32′09″E	Yellow River	96	33	Operational	4×24MW
Xiaoxia Hydro Power Station	小峡水电站	36°08′48″N 104°00′52″E	Yellow River	230	50.7	Operational	4×57.5MW
Daxia Hydro Power Station	大峡水电站	36°18′19″N 104°09′39″E	Yellow River	324.5	72	Operational	4×75 MW, 1×24.5 MW
Wujinxia Hydro Power Station	乌金峡水电站	36°23′57″N 104°23′56″E	Yellow River	140	55	Operational	4×35MW
Bikou Hydro Power Station	碧口水电站	32°45′37″N 105°13′28″E	Bailong River	300	101	Operational	3×100 MW
Jiudianxia Hydro Power Station	九甸峡水利枢纽	34°55′26″N 103°49′58″E	Tao River	300	136.5	Operational	3×100 MW
Miaojiaba Hydro Power Station	苗家坝水电站	32°50′07″N 105°00′52″E	Bailong River	240	111	Operational	3×80 MW
Qilinsi Hydro Power Station	麒麟寺水电站	32°45′35″N 105°19′46″E	Bailong River	111	52	Operational	3×100 MW

==== Pumped-storage ====
Station	Name in Chinese	Coordinates	Status	Capacity (MW)	Height difference (meters)	Operational units	Under construction units
Yumen Changma Pumped-storage Hydro Power Station	玉门昌马抽水蓄能电站		UC	1,200	421		4×300MW
Zhangye Pandaoshan Pumped-storage Hydro Power Station	张掖盘道山抽水蓄能电站		UC	1,400	576		4×350MW
Huangcheng Pumped-storage Hydro Power Station	皇城抽水蓄能电站		UC	1,400	543		4×350MW
Huangyang Pumped-storage Hydro Power Station	黄羊抽水蓄能电站		UC	1,400	480		4×350MW
Huanglong Pumped-storage Hydro Power Station	黄龙抽水蓄能电站		UC	1,400	645		4×350MW

=== Wind ===
Station	Name in Chinese	Coordinates	Operational capacity (MW)	Status	Commissioning date	Turbine manufacturer	Number of turbines	Owner	Reference
Guazhou Wind Farm	瓜州风电场	40°45′51″N 95°47′43″E		Operational					
Yumen Wind Farm	玉门风电基地	40°13′36″N 96°54′04″E		Operational					
Anbei Phase 1		40°46′0″N 96°12′0″E	99	Operational		Sinovel	33	CLP Group / CGN Wind Energy Ltd	
Anbei Phase 2		40°46′0″N 96°12′0″E	100	Operational		Goldwind	40	CLP Group / CGN Wind Energy Ltd	
Anbei Phase 3		40°46′0″N 96°12′0″E	297	Operational		Guangdong Mingyang	198	CLP Group / CGN Wind Energy Ltd	
Anbei Phase 4		40°46′0″N 96°12′0″E	105	Operational		Guodian United Power	70	CLP Group / CGN Wind Energy Ltd	
Gansu Wind Farm		40°12′0″N 96°54′0″E	7900	Operational					
Mahuangtan		40°17′30.6″N 97°2′43.9″E	400	Operational	2014	Guangdong Mingyang			
Autonomation Project Longyuan			250.5	Operational	2010	Goldwind	167		
Maojing			400	Operational	2016	Skywind	200	Huadian Power	

=== Solar ===
Station	Name in Chinese	Coordinates	Operational capacity (MW)	Status	Reference
Guazhou Photovoltaic Power Farm	瓜州光伏电站	40°36′42″N 96°24′55″E		Operational	
Dunhuang Photovoltaic Power Farm	敦煌光伏电站	40°07′51″N 94°28′35″E, 40°06′21″N 94°28′49″E, 40°04′33″N 94°28′52″E, 40°04′19″N 94°31′21″E		Operational	
Akesai Photovoltaic Power Farm	阿克赛光伏电站	39°36′11″N 94°14′19″E, 39°34′45″N 94°15′22″E		Operational	
Yumen Photovoltaic Power Farm	玉门光伏电站	40°15′01″N 97°06′29″E		Operational	
Jiayuguan Photovoltaic Power Farm	嘉峪关光伏电站	39°49′06″N 97°47′36″E, 39°49′02″N 97°51′45″E, 39°48′00″N 97°51′37″E, 39°44′56″N 98°00′54″E, 39°45′24″N 98°03′14″E, 39°45′50″N 98°06′03″E, 39°45′16″N 98°07′23″E, 39°42′24″N 98°01′01″E, 39°44′07″N 98°04′46″E		Operational	

== See also ==
- List of power stations in China
