= Chone Drakpa Shedrup =

Chone Drakpa Shedrup (Tibetan: ཅོ་ནེ་གྲགས་པ་བཤད་སྒྲུབ་; Wylie: co ne grags pa bshad sgrub; Chinese: 卓尼•扎巴谢珠, Pinyin: Zhuoni Zhaba Xiezhu; 1675–1748) was a Tibetan Buddhist monk of the Gelug (dGe lugs) school. He was from the region of Chone (Jonê) in Amdo (southwest Gansu) and had studied at the Ramoche Temple in Lhasa, where he later headed a Dratshang (monastic college).

He authored numerous texts and commentaries. His Collected Works in 18 volumes with information about the local scholastic traditions are contained in the Tibetan series Mes po'i shul bzhag.

His commentary on the Heart Sutra has been translated into English by Fedor Stracke.

== Bibliography ==
- Tang Jingfu (唐景福): Zhongguo Zangchuan Fojiao ming seng lu (中国藏传佛教名僧录). Lanzhou: Gansu Nationalities Publishing House (甘肃民族出版社), 1991. Online
