= Wuping =

Wuping (Chinese: 武平 unless otherwise noted) may refer to:

- Wuping (570–576), era name used by Gao Wei, emperor of Northern Qi
- Wuping Jiedushi, a successor state of Ma Chu during the 10th century

== Places in China ==
- Wuping County, a county in western Fujian
- Wuping, Chongqing, a town in Fengdu County, Chongqing
- Wuping, Gansu (武坪), a town in Zhugqu County, Gansu
- Wuping, Guangxi, a town in Jingxi, Guangxi

== See also ==
- Wu Ping (born 1966?), a Chinese woman who held out her property in Chongqing
