= Madang Township, Gansu =

Madang Township 麻当乡
- Township
- Madangxiang
- Location in Gansu
- Coordinates: 35°19′7″N 102°47′6″E
- Country: People's Republic of China
- Province: Gansu
- Autonomous prefecture: Gannan Tibetan Autonomous Prefecture
- County: Xiahe County

Area
  - Total: 359.3 km^{2} (138.7 sq mi)

Population (2010)
  - Total: 5,662
  - Density: 15.76/km^{2} (40.81/sq mi)
- Time zone: UTC+8 (China Standard)
- Local dialing code: 941

Madang Township (Mandarin: 麻当乡) is a township in Xiahe County, Gannan Tibetan Autonomous Prefecture, Gansu, China. In 2010, Madang Township had a total population of 5,662: 2,899 males and 2,763 females: 1,034 aged under 14, 4,054 aged between 15 and 65 and 574 aged over 65.

== See also ==
- List of township-level divisions of Gansu
