= Kecai Township, Gansu =

Township in Gansu, China

Kecai Township 科才乡
- Township
- Kecaixiang
- Location in Gansu
- Coordinates: 34°38′15″N 102°13′34″E
- Country: People's Republic of China
- Province: Gansu
- Autonomous prefecture: Gannan Tibetan Autonomous Prefecture
- County: Xiahe County

Area
  - Total: 900.6 km^{2} (347.7 sq mi)

Population (2010)
  - Total: 3,729
  - Density: 4.141/km^{2} (10.72/sq mi)
- Time zone: UTC+8 (China Standard)
- Local dialing code: 941

Kecai Township (Chinese: 科才乡) is a township in Xiahe County, Gannan Tibetan Autonomous Prefecture, Gansu, China. In 2010, Kecai Township had a total population of 3,729: 1,913 males and 1,816 females: 933 aged under 14, 2,570 aged between 15 and 65 and 226 aged over 65.

== See also ==
- List of township-level divisions of Gansu
