= Gahai Township, Gansu =

Gahai Township 尕海镇
- Township
- Gahaixiang
- Location in Gansu
- Coordinates: 34°15′30″N 102°22′4″E
- Country: People's Republic of China
- Province: Gansu
- Autonomous prefecture: Gannan Tibetan Autonomous Prefecture
- County: Luqu County

Area
  - Total: 1,458 km^{2} (563 sq mi)

Population (2010)
  - Total: 5,257
  - Density: 3.606/km^{2} (9.339/sq mi)
- Time zone: UTC+8 (China Standard)
- Local dialing code: 941

Gahai Township (Chinese: 尕海镇) is a township in Luqu County, Gannan Tibetan Autonomous Prefecture, Gansu, China. In 2010, Gahai Township had a total population of 5,257: 2,666 males and 2,591 females: 1,383 aged under 14, 3,553 aged between 15 and 65 and 321 aged over 65.

== See also ==
- List of township-level divisions of Gansu
