= Larenguan Township, Gansu =

Larenguan Township 拉仁关乡
- Township
- Larenguanxiang
- Location in Gansu
- Coordinates: 34°31′49″N 102°38′13″E
- Country: People's Republic of China
- Province: Gansu
- Autonomous prefecture: Gannan Tibetan Autonomous Prefecture
- County: Luqu County

Area
  - Total: 754 km^{2} (291 sq mi)

Population (2010)
  - Total: 2,870
  - Density: 3.81/km^{2} (9.86/sq mi)
- Time zone: UTC+8 (China Standard)
- Local dialing code: 941

Larenguan Township (Mandarin: 拉仁关乡) is a township in Luqu County, Gannan Tibetan Autonomous Prefecture, Gansu, China. In 2010, Larenguan Township had a total population of 2,870: 1,412 males and 1,458 females: 783 aged under 14, 1,874 aged between 15 and 65 and 213 aged over 65.

== Administrative divisions ==
Larenguan Township governs the following areas:

Tangke Village, Zecha Village and Mari Village.

== See also ==
- List of township-level divisions of Gansu
