= Liulin, Gansu =

Town in Gansu Province, China

Liulin (Chinese: 柳林镇; pinyin: liǔlín zhèn) is a town situated adjacent to the major Tibetan Geluk Jonê Monastery, on the northern bank of the Lu-chu river in Jonê County, Gannan Tibetan Autonomous Prefecture, Gansu Province, China, at an altitude of about 2,610 m (8,563 ft).

It is fairly large in size at 374 km^{2}. and is the administrative centre for Jonê County and the population, nowadays, is predominantly Chinese. In 1923, however, the town had: "approximately four hundred Tibetan families and had changed very little since its founding six centuries before."

Today on main street can be found the Chone Printing Press, the Bank of Industry and Commerce, the Xinhua Bookstore, the People's Bank, the Commercial Guesthouse and number of government administrative buildings, including the police station.

== See also ==
- List of township-level divisions of Gansu

== Sources ==
- Cabot, Mabel H. (2003). Vanished Kingdoms: A Woman Explorer in Tibet, China & Mongolia, 1921-1925, pp. 148–157. Aperture Publishers in association with the Peabody Museum, Harvard. ISBN 978-1-931788-18-2.
- Dorje, Gyurme (2009). Footprint Tibet Handbook. Footprint Publications, Bath, England. ISBN 978-1-906098-32-2.
- Osada, Yukiyasu, Gavin Allwright and Atsushi Kanamaru. (2004). Mapping the Tibetan World. Kotan Publishing, Tokyo, Japan. ISBN 0-9701716-0-9.
