= Ganjia Town =

Ganjia Town Chinese: 甘加镇 Tibetan: རྒན་གྱ་གྲོང་རྡལ
- Township
- Ganjia zhen
- Location in Gansu
- Coordinates: 35°24′1″N 102°31′7″E
- Country: People's Republic of China
- Province: Gansu
- Autonomous prefecture: Gannan Tibetan Autonomous Prefecture
- County: Xiahe County

Area
  - Total: 841.4 km^{2} (324.9 sq mi)

Population (2010)
  - Total: 7,334
  - Density: 8.716/km^{2} (22.58/sq mi)
- Time zone: UTC+8 (China Standard)
- Local dialing code: 941

Ganjia Town (Chinese: 甘加镇; pinyin: Gānjiā Zhèn, རྒན་གྱ་གྲོང་རྡལ; Tibetan: Wylie: rgan gya grong rdal), until 2017 known as Ganjia Township, is a town in the northwestern part of Xiahe County, Gannan Tibetan Autonomous Prefecture, in southern Gansu, China. Situated on the northeastern margin of the Tibetan Plateau, it is rich in high-altitude grassland. The area is known for pastoralism, Tibetan Buddhist religious sites and archaeological remains, particularly the fortified settlement of Bajiaocheng.

The area has historically formed part of a cultural contact zone between Tibetan communities on the Tibetan plateau and Han populations associated with the Loess Plateau. Archaeological research in the area has examined ancient fortified settlements and the development of human occupation in this transitional region.

== Geography ==
Ganjia is located in the northwestern part of Xiahe County, in the southern part of Gansu, near the provincial boundary with Qinghai. The area includes broad grasslands, river valleys and mountainous terrain characteristic of the northeastern Tibetan Plateau as it transitions to the Loess Plateau.

The town covers approximately 770.7 square kilometres. Its average elevation is about 3,300 metres above sea level, with its highest point at 4,630 metres, in the Dalijia Mountains (Chinese: 达力加山; pinyin: Dálìjiā shān), the highest in Xiahe County. This elevation creates a cold, dry climate and a relatively short growing season. The local government reports an average annual temperature of around 1°C and annual precipitation of approximately 350 millimetres.

Grassland occupies a substantial part of the area, providing high-altitude pasture for livestock grazing. Biodiversity is high, with the Chinese mountain cat, the Pallas's cat, the snow leopard, the black-necked crane and upland buzzard being among the species found in this area.

== History ==
The Ganjia Basin has long been situated in a region of interaction between communities associated with the Tibetan Plateau and those connected to the Chinese interior. Its archaeological remains provide evidence for investigations into settlement, defence, migration and cultural exchange. Several ancient fortified settlements have been identified in the basin, including Bajiaocheng and Sirou Ancient City (Chinese: 斯柔古城). However, dating and interpretation of individual sites remain subjects of archaeological research.

Ganjia was established as a township in 1950. It was reorganised as a people's commune in 1968 and restored as a township in 1983. In 2017, it was converted from a township to a town.

== Administrative divisions ==
Ganjia Town administers seven village-level divisions:

- Bajiaocheng Village (八角城村)
- Zuohai Village (作海村)
- Kajia Village (卡加村)
- Renqing Village (仁青村)
- Wadai Village (哇代村)
- Xike Village (西科村)
- Ren'ai Village (仁艾村)

The town government is based in Renqing Village. The administrative village of Bajiaocheng includes the historic fortified settlement of the same name.

== Demographics ==
According to the 2010 census data reported by City Population, Ganjia had a population of 7,334, comprising 3,617 males and 3,717 females. Of the population, 1,619 people were under the age of 15, 5,219 were aged 15–64, and 496 were aged 65 or older.

The population is predominantly Tibetan. Figures published by the Xiahe County government in 2023 reported 8,369 residents, including 7,858 Tibetans. A later government profile published in January 2026 reported 8,313 residents, including 8,065 Tibetans.

== Economy ==
Animal husbandry is the principal economic activity in Ganjia. The extensive grasslands support the raising of sheep, cattle, yak and other livestock, and the local economy is closely associated with pastoral livelihoods. The county government has identified Ganjia as one of Xiahe County's principal pastoral areas.

Agriculture is also practised, particularly in areas suitable for cultivation. Crops reported by the local government include highland barley, rapeseed and oats.

The area's archaeological remains, e cologically rich grasslands and religious sites have potential for tourism. Bajiaocheng is particularly notable as a historic fortified settlement, while local monasteries are part of the region's Tibetan Buddhist heritage.

== Bajiaocheng ==
Bajiaocheng (Chinese: 八角城; pinyin: Bājiǎo chéng, literally "Eight-Cornered City", officially the Bajiao Ancient City or Bajiao City Site (Chinese: 八角城城址; pinyin: Bājiǎochéng chéngzhǐ), is an ancient fortified settlement in the Ganjia grasslands. It is also commonly known by its Tibetan name Yungdrung Kar (གཡུང་དྲུང་མཁར་, Wylie: g.yung drung mkhar), likely referring to the swastika-like shape of its city walls. Its distinctive form and surviving fortifications make it one of the area's best-known historic sites. Situated on a raised area near the confluence of the Yangqu and Yangla rivers, the site is notable for its unusual defensive layout, which differs from the rectangular plans common to many traditional Chinese walled towns.

The site has been interpreted as a fortified settlement and military stronghold, but the precise date of the city's foundation has been heavily debated. Various periods, including the Han, Tang and Song dynasties, have been posited. The Chinese government designated the site a provincial-level cultural relic in 1981 and included it among the sixth batch of National Key Cultural Relics Protection Units in May 2006.

== See also ==
- Xiahe County
- Gannan Tibetan Autonomous Prefecture
- List of township-level divisions of Gansu
