= Bikou =

Bikou 碧口镇
- Town
- Location within Gansu Location within China
- Country: China
- Province: Gansu
- Prefecture-level City: Longnan
- County: Wen

Area
  - Total: 200 km^{2} (77 sq mi)
- Elevation: 624 m (2,047 ft)

Population (2008)
  - Total: 16,901

Bikou Town (碧口镇) is a town under Wen County, in Longnan, Gansu. It is located along the Bailong River, just downstream of the Bikou Dam. In 2008 it had a population of 16,901.

== History ==
Bikou has been mentioned in Southern Song dynasty poems and Han dynasty documents. Since the Ming dynasty it has been an important trading town, most of its merchants originating from Sichuan. Therefore the town has its own dialect based on Sichuanese dialect Its importance for trade originates from its location as the first navigable spot of the Yangtze basin, used for shipping Longnan's famous medicinal plants to eastern China, and along a main road between Gansu and Sichuan. Nowadays the town is home to industry and tea cultivation.

Together with neighbouring Zhongmiao town, it was the hardest hit area in Gansu from the 2008 Sichuan earthquake. Most of the buildings and infrastructure were destroyed.

During the 1980s, a gold mine was opened near Bikou.

== Culture ==
Bikou is known for its Sichuan opera.

== Administration ==
The towns administration center is Bifeng Village (碧峰村).

Other administrative villages:

- Xianglang (响浪村)
- Hejiawan (何家湾村)
- Shitudi (石土地村)
- Jingdi (井地村)
- Qushui (曲水村)
- Liziba (李子坝村)
- Baiguo (白果村)

== History & Literature ==
Bikou is mentioned in the opening paragraph of Li Jieren's 1936 novel Ripple on a Standing Pool (sishui weilan, 死水微澜):

Setting forth from the provincial capital, out the north gate of the city wall and onward to the county of Xindu, the distance is generally put at forty li, though in fact it’s somewhat less. The road describes a winding filament across the level tapestry of cultivated land, and although it measures scarcely five feet broad and has just two lines of flagging, both paving the right-hand side, and although the slob after rain lies so deep that without new sandals you can scarcely move a step, and although in spring around grave-sweeping time this same slob turns to dust that billows from the heels of every passing traveler, nonetheless it’s what we call Chuanbei Dadao, the Northern Sichuan Highway. It stretches as far as Guangyuan County on the provincial frontier, then on into Shaanxi, through Ningqiang County and Hanzhong prefecture and still farther on from there. This is no less than the original post route for communication with the northern capital. Moreover, since the western fork at Guangyuan passes out through the market town of Bikou on the border of Gansu Province and through the Gansu counties of Jiezhou and Wen, this dusty filament is the route too that any goods going or coming from the northwestern provinces must needs negotiate.
