= Xicang Township, Gansu =

Xicang Township 西仓镇
- Township
- Xicangxiang
- Location in Gansu
- Coordinates: 34°33′56″N 102°34′13″E
- Country: People's Republic of China
- Province: Gansu
- Autonomous prefecture: Gannan Tibetan Autonomous Prefecture
- County: Luqu County

Area
  - Total: 232.2 km^{2} (89.7 sq mi)

Population (2010)
  - Total: 2,927
  - Density: 12.61/km^{2} (32.65/sq mi)
- Time zone: UTC+8 (China Standard)
- Local dialing code: 941

Xicang Township (Mandarin: 西仓镇) is a township in Luqu County, Gannan Tibetan Autonomous Prefecture, Gansu, China. In 2010, Xicang Township had a total population of 2,927: 1,598 males and 1,329 females: 685 aged under 14, 1,957 aged between 15 and 65 and 285 aged over 65.

== See also ==
- List of township-level divisions of Gansu
