= Zorgey Ritoma =

Village in Gansu, China

Zorgey Ritoma is a village situated in Gannan Tibetan Autonomous Prefecture, Gansu province, China. The population of around 1,500 is ethnically Tibetan. Most of the inhabitants raise cattle for a living.

The village has 10,000 yaks and 25,000 sheep. However, a growing portion is now being employed in the textile industry.

== See also ==
- List of villages in China
- Labrang Monastery
- Kim Yeshi
