= Kim Yeshi =

French-American anthropologist

- Born: Kimberly Sciaky Yeshi
- Education: University of Virginia
- Scientific career
- Fields: Anthropology

Kimberly Sciaky Yeshi is a French-American anthropologist.

== Life ==
In 2005, Kim Yeshi began researching yak wool because of its soft, warm qualities. With the help of her daughter, Dechen, she set up a workshop in Zorgey Ritoma, Amdo in 2007 creating jobs for the local community. The project began as a way to utilize local resources and create sustainable industry, to give nomads who had too few animals or wished for opportunities other than herding, work in their own villages, rather than having to migrate to local cities looking for jobs. Dechen, her husband Yidam, and three other people from their core team spent time in Cambodia and Nepal studying weaving and spinning techniques, and bought weaving equipment in Katmandu, which they transported to Ritoma. They then hired and trained local nomads who soon became skilled artisans.

Tianjin Satellite Television featured their efforts to train the local nomads in a documentary. The workshop employs over 100 workers, most of whom have been employed since 2008. To ensure that the products remain traditional, no synthetic dyes or bleaching are used. Yeshi obtained natural dyes from Switzerland, which produce colors found in the natural landscape of Tibet.
