= Bailong River =

Tributary of the Yangtze River in China

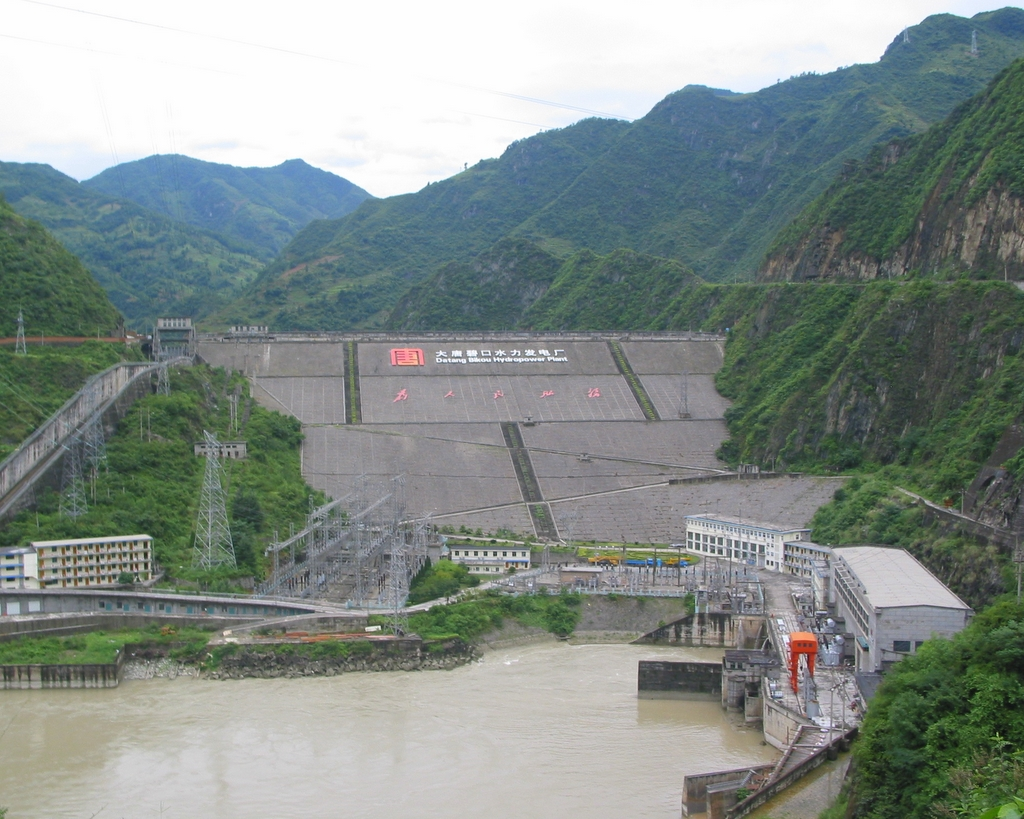

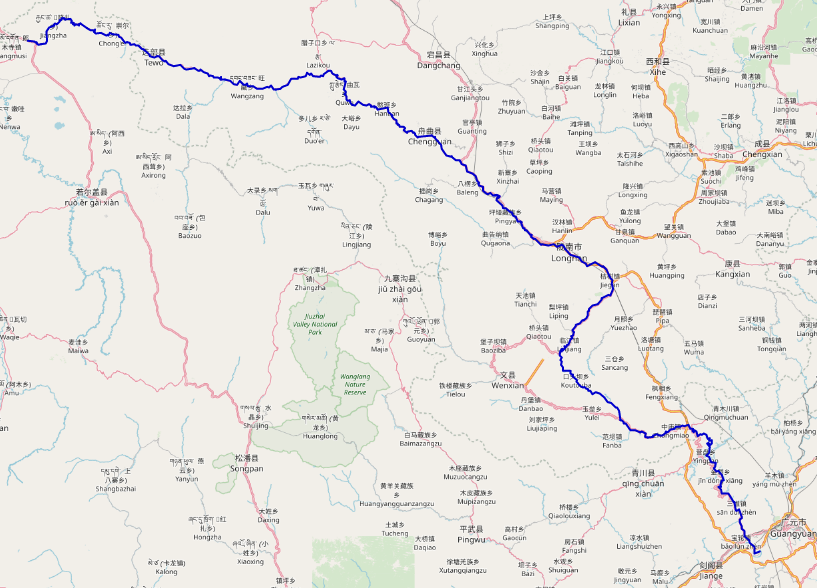
- Bailong River
- Native name: 白龙江 (Chinese); འབྲུག་ཆུ (Standard Tibetan)

Location
- Country: China
- Provinces: Gansu; Sichuan

Physical characteristics
- Source
  - location: Langmusi
- Mouth: Jialing River
  - location: Guangyuan
  - coordinates: 32°22′11″N 105°42′36″E
- Length: 576 km (358 mi)
- Basin size: 31,808 km^{2} (12,281 mi^{2})

The Bailong River (simplified Chinese: 白龙江; traditional Chinese: 白龍江; pinyin: Báilóng Jiāng; lit. 'White Dragon River') or Khuchu, Drukchu (Tibetan: འབྲུག་ཆུ, Wylie: vbrug chu, ZWPY: Zhugqu) is a 576 km-long river in the Yangtze River basin. From its source to confluence with the Jialing River, the Bailong is actually longer and is thus the main stem of the Jialing River system. The scenic Jiuzhaigou reserve is found along one of the Bailong's tributaries. Two reservoirs have been constructed in Wen County (Bikou Dam). The reservoirs serve to provide hydroelectricity, aquaculture, flood control, irrigation and for tourism development.

== History ==
In August 2010, heavy rains triggered a mudslide that dammed the river in Zhugqu County, Gansu, causing extensive damage and killing over a thousand people.

== Course ==
The Bailong River, in name, rises in Gansu's Luqu County, just west of the town of Langmusi. The river drains the northern sections of the Min Mountains and then flows through Zhugqu and Longnan before meeting the Jialing River in Guangyuan, Sichuan. The main stem of the river, however, is actually a tributary that has its source in the Min Mountains, north of Songpan.

== See also ==
- List of rivers in China
