= Hezuo =

Hezuo 合作市 · གཙོས་གྲོང་ཁྱེར། Zö
- County-level city
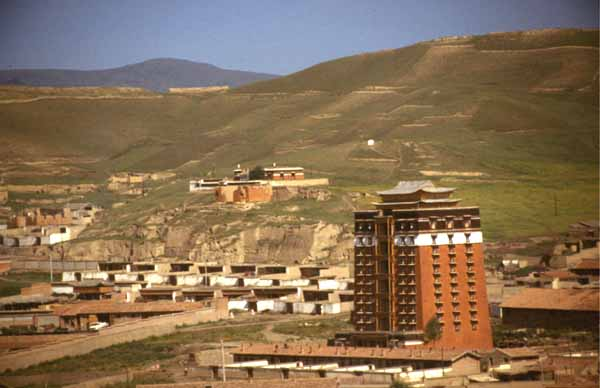
- "Tso Monastery" in Hezuo

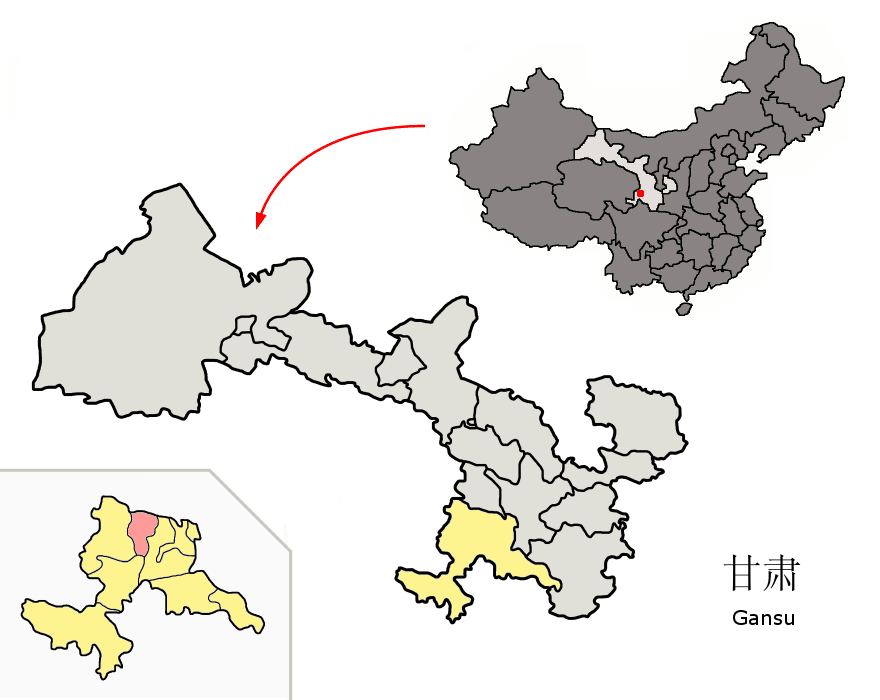
- Hezuo City (red) within Gannan Prefecture (yellow) and Gansu

- Location in Gansu Hezuo (China)
- Coordinates (Hezhou municipal government): 35°00′01″N 102°54′37″E
- Country: China
- Province: Gansu
- Autonomous prefecture: Gannan
- Municipal seat: Gyamkar Subdistrict

Area
  - Total: 2,670 km^{2} (1,030 sq mi)
- Elevation: 2,883 m (9,459 ft)

Population (2020)
  - Total: 112,173
  - Density: 42.0/km^{2} (109/sq mi)
- Time zone: UTC+8 (China Standard)
- Postal code: 747000
- Area code: (0)941
- Website: www.hezuo.gov.cn

Hezuo

Chinese name
- Chinese: 合作市
Transcriptions
Standard Mandarin
- Hanyu Pinyin: Hézuò Shì

Tibetan name
- Tibetan: གཙོས་གྲོང་ཁྱིར།
Transcriptions
- Wylie: gtsos grong khyer
- Tibetan Pinyin: Zö Chongkyir

Hezuo city (Chinese: 合作市; pinyin: Hézuò Shì), also known as Zö from its Tibetan name (Tibetan: གཙོས་གྲོང་ཁྱེར།, Wylie: Gtsos grong khyer), is the administrative seat of the Gannan Tibetan Autonomous Prefecture (TAP) in southern Gansu province in Northwestern China. It is home to the Gêndên Qöling (Zö Gönba) and its Milaraiba Tower, the Langshangmaio Temple, and a mosque.

== Name ==
The Tibetan name "Zö" གཙོས། is pronounced Dzoi in Standard Tibetan and pronounced Hdzoi/Hdzu in local dialect.

The Chinese name before the 1950s was "Heicuo" (黑错), a transliteration of the Tibetan name. In 1956, the name was changed to the similar-sounding "Hezuo" (合作), meaning "cooperation", which reflected the desire to bring unity and harmony to Hezuo.

== History ==
Originally a rare populated wetland, mass city-construction began in the 1950s.

During 1953, the Gannan Tibetan Autonomous Prefecture was created, and the town of Hezuo (not yet a city) was part of it.

In May 1956, Hezuo was named by a provincial government employee.

During June 1996, the government announced the establishment of Hezuo, and on January 1, 1998, the city was officially established.

== Population ==
The total population of Hezuo city in 2010 was 81,000. The rural population was 35,000, about for 43% of the total population, and the 57% of the urban population was 46,000. 54% of the population is Tibetan, which is about 44,000.

The city's permanent population was 95,000 at the end of 2017. Urban population is 51,000, the rate of urbanization was 57.10 percent. The natural population growth rate was 9.57 percent. Birth rate was 15.09 percent. Population mortality rate was 5.52 percent, 0-14 year old population is 19,500, and the population of 15–64 years old is 67,200.

At the end of 2019, the registered population of Hezuo City was 93,727.

=== Nationalities ===
There are Tibetan, Han, Hui, Salar, Dongxiang, Baoan, Manchu, Tu, Mongolian, Yugu, Koreans and other ethnic groups in Hezuo city.

== Natural resources ==
In Hezuo city, yaks and Tibetan sheep are the major animals, with total of about 300,000, about 250,000 yaks and Tibetan sheep remain at the end of year. Beside two major animal, Hezuo also have a famous animal called the Juema Pig (蕨麻豬). The major trees in Hezuo are fir, spruce, pine, Huashan pine, poplar, birch, cypress, and willow. Shrubs in Hezuo city including sea buckthorn, rhododendron, cypress, plum and catalpa. Highland barley, spring wheat and rapeseed are the normal staple food people eat.

== Economic ==
In 2020, Hezuo City expects that the city's regional GDP will reach 5.89 billion yuan, 1.8 times the level projected in the twelfth five-year plan. The added value of industrial enterprises above designated size will be 570 million yuan, an average annual growth rate of 5%.

Primary industry

The city's annual primary industry industrial added value was 216.87 million yuan, of which, planting industry was 30.48 million yuan, forestry was 1.11 million yuan, animal husbandry was 184.75 million yuan, and agriculture, forestry, animal husbandry and fishery services were 520,000 yuan.

Secondary industry

In 2017, all industries in Hezuo city industrial production has value of 563.84 million yuan. Industrial production of industries above designated size was 498.84 million yuan. Industrial production of industries below designated size was 65 million yuan. Export delivery value was 6.06 million yuan.

Tertiary industry

At the end of 2018, it received 2.026 million tourists, with a comprehensive tourism income of 1.03 billion yuan. The city has 125 hotels and restaurants, with a total of more than 5,500 guest rooms and more than 10,000 beds.

== Geography and climate ==
With an elevation of nearly 3,000 metres (9,800 ft), Hezuo has an alpine subarctic climate (Köppen Dwc), with long, very cold, dry winters, and short, mild summers. The monthly daily mean temperature in January, the coldest month, is −9.3 °C (15.3 °F), while the same figure for July, the warmest month, is 13.3 °C (55.9 °F); the annual mean is 2.82 °C (37.1 °F). Most of the annual precipitation is delivered from May to September. With monthly percent possible sunshine ranging from 44% in June and September to 71% in December, the city receives 2,370 hours of bright sunshine annually.

Climate data for Hezuo, elevation 2,909 m (9,544 ft), (1991–2020 normals, extremes 1957–present)
Month	Jan	Feb	Mar	Apr	May	Jun	Jul	Aug	Sep	Oct	Nov	Dec	Year
Record high °C (°F)	17.1 (62.8)	18.6 (65.5)	23.6 (74.5)	29.2 (84.6)	27.2 (81.0)	27.2 (81.0)	30.4 (86.7)	28.7 (83.7)	28.1 (82.6)	24.6 (76.3)	20.4 (68.7)	15.0 (59.0)	30.4 (86.7)
Mean daily maximum °C (°F)	1.8 (35.2)	4.4 (39.9)	8.1 (46.6)	12.6 (54.7)	15.6 (60.1)	18.3 (64.9)	20.6 (69.1)	20.3 (68.5)	16.4 (61.5)	11.5 (52.7)	7.4 (45.3)	3.3 (37.9)	11.7 (53.0)
Daily mean °C (°F)	−9.1 (15.6)	−5.6 (21.9)	−0.7 (30.7)	4.2 (39.6)	8.1 (46.6)	11.4 (52.5)	13.6 (56.5)	13.0 (55.4)	9.3 (48.7)	3.9 (39.0)	−2.3 (27.9)	−7.6 (18.3)	3.2 (37.7)
Mean daily minimum °C (°F)	−16.6 (2.1)	−12.8 (9.0)	−7.0 (19.4)	−2.2 (28.0)	2.0 (35.6)	5.8 (42.4)	8.0 (46.4)	7.6 (45.7)	4.7 (40.5)	−0.9 (30.4)	−8.5 (16.7)	−14.9 (5.2)	−2.9 (26.8)
Record low °C (°F)	−33 (−27)	−29.9 (−21.8)	−25.1 (−13.2)	−20.2 (−4.4)	−10.0 (14.0)	−5.2 (22.6)	−0.6 (30.9)	−1.3 (29.7)	−5.7 (21.7)	−17.0 (1.4)	−23.8 (−10.8)	−27.9 (−18.2)	−33 (−27)
Average precipitation mm (inches)	5.0 (0.20)	6.8 (0.27)	17.1 (0.67)	33.8 (1.33)	73.2 (2.88)	80.4 (3.17)	115.5 (4.55)	95.8 (3.77)	75.2 (2.96)	41.6 (1.64)	7.4 (0.29)	1.5 (0.06)	553.3 (21.79)
Average precipitation days (≥ 0.1 mm)	4.4	5.8	9.8	10.9	16.7	18.5	17.4	17.2	16.3	12.7	4.4	2.8	136.9
Average snowy days	7.3	9.5	12.9	10.8	4.3	0.4	0	0.1	1.0	7.3	7.1	5.5	66.2
Average relative humidity (%)	49	52	57	60	65	70	74	75	77	73	61	51	64
Mean monthly sunshine hours	202.2	189.5	206.8	212.2	207.5	191.0	208.6	202.4	162.6	180.3	206.2	209.5	2,378.8
Percentage possible sunshine	64	61	55	54	48	44	48	49	44	52	67	69	55
Source: China Meteorological Administrationextremes

== Administrative divisions ==
Hezuo City has four subdistricts, three towns and three townships.

Name	Simplified Chinese	Hanyu Pinyin	Tibetan	Wylie	Administrative division code
Subdistricts
Tungchug Subdistrict (Dangzhou)	当周街道	Dāngzhōu Jiēdào	དུང་ཕྲུག་ཁྲོམ་གཞུང་།	dung phrug khrom gzhung	623001001
Yagnying Subdistrict (Yihe'ang)	伊合昂街道	Yīhé'áng Jiēdào	གཡག་སྙིང༌ཁྲོམ་གཞུང་།	g.yag snying khrom gzhung	623001002
Gyamkar Subdistrict (Jianmuke'er)	坚木克尔街道	Jiānmùkè'ěr Jiēdào	རྒྱ་མཁར་ཁྲོམ་གཞུང་།	rgyal mkhar khrom gzhung	623001003
Toiqing Subdistrict (Tongqin)	通钦街道	Tōngqīn Jiēdào	ཐོད་ཆིངས་ཁྲོམ་གཞུང་།	thod chings khrom gzhung	623001004
Towns
Na'og Town (Nawu, Nabug)	那吾镇	Nàwú Zhèn	སྣ་འོག་གྲོང་རྡལ།	sna 'og grong rdal	623001100
Luxoi Town (Lexiu)	勒秀镇	Lèxiù Zhèn	ཀླུ་ཤོད་གྲོང་རྡལ།	klu shod grong rdal	623001101
Zogemema Town (Zogamanma)	佐盖曼玛镇	Zuǒgàimànmǎ Zhèn	མཛོད་དགེ་སྨད་མ་གྲོང་རྡལ།	mdzod dge smad ma grong rdal	623001102
Townships
Ka'gyamai Township (Kajiaman)	卡加曼乡	Kǎjiāmàn Xiāng	ཁ་གྱ་སྨད་ཤང་།	kha gya smad shang	623001200
Ka'gyadoi Township (Kajiadao)	卡加道乡	Kǎjiādào Xiāng	ཁ་གྱ་སྟོད་ཤང་།	kha gya stod shang	623001201
Zogetodma Township (Zuogaiduoma)	佐盖多玛乡	Zuǒgàiduōmǎ Xiāng	མཛོད་དགེ་སྟོད་མ་ཤང་།	mdzod dge stod ma shang	623001202

== Transport ==
- China National Highway 213
- Gannan Xiahe Airport, 56 kilometers from Zoi was started September 2010 and completed in August 2013.
- The planned Lanzhou–Hezuo railway will terminate here
