= 2010 Gansu mudslide =

Mudslide in China

Coordinates: 33°47′N 104°22′E

- Landslide (Gansu) Landslide (China)
- Date: 8 August 2010
- Time: ≈23:00 CST (UTC+08:00)
- Location: Zhouqu County, Gansu, China
- Type: Landslide
- Deaths: 1,471
- Missing: 294

A deadly mudslide in Zhouqu County, Gannan Tibetan Autonomous Prefecture, Gansu Province, China occurred at midnight on 8 August 2010. It was the deadliest individual disaster related to the 2010 China floods. The mudslides killed more than 1,471 people as of 21 August 2010, while 1,243 others have been rescued and 294 remain missing. The missing were presumed dead as officials ordered locals to stop searching for survivors or bodies to prevent the spread of disease. Over 1,700 people evacuated had to temporarily live in schools. The floods and mudslide were triggered after decades of clearcut logging practices had reduced the ability of the watershed to absorb heavy rainfall.

== Cause ==
External image
- Map and satellite image of the affected area

Zhugqu County was the worst hit location, where mud submerged houses and tore multi-storey blocks of flats to pieces. The seat of Zhouqu County was densely populated, with 50,000 people (42,000 of them are permanent population) in an area of 2 square kilometres (0.77 sq mi). After the heavy rain, there was a buildup of water behind a dam of debris blocking a small river to the north of the city of Zhugqu; when the dam broke, around 1,800,000 cubic metres (64,000,000 cu ft) of mud and rocks swept through the town, in a surge reported as up to five stories high, covering more than 300 low-rise homes and burying at least one village entirely. The mudslide left an area 5 kilometres (3.1 mi) long by 300 metres (980 ft) wide in average levelled by mud with average thickness of 5 metres (16 ft).

The Christian Science Monitor reported that two science researchers had predicted the mudslides in 1997.

The People's Daily has argued that the mudslide was due to a "perfect storm" of natural events, including "soft" "weathered" rock, heavy rainfall, drought, and the Sichuan earthquake two years before. Authorities dismissed claims that the mudslides were "man-made".

== Relief ==
The Gansu province had received 120,000,000 Chinese yuan (US$17,000,700 ) by 13 August. Hong Kong and Macau both donated millions of dollars to Gansu, with Macau donating more than US$7 million, and the United States donated $50,000 to Zhugqu County. Gyaincain Norbu, China's 11th Panchen Lama choice, donated ¥50,000 to relief efforts and prayed for the victims.

== Reaction ==
On 15 August, a day of mourning was observed, with flags lowered to half-mast at government buildings within China and at embassies in foreign countries. Additionally, all public and online entertainment was suspended, and major newspapers and internet sites were grayscaled. At the Expo 2010 in Shanghai, all activities were canceled. Such events are rare in China; only after an earlier earthquake in 2010 and the 2008 Sichuan earthquake in recent years have such periods of mourning been observed.
