= Gannan Xiahe Airport =

Gannan Xiahe Airport 甘南夏河机场 ཀན་ལྷོ་བསང་ཆུ་ནམ་གྲུ་ཐང་།
- IATA: GXH; ICAO: ZLXH

Summary
- Airport type: Public
- Serves: Hezuo and Xiahe
- Location: Xiahe County, Gansu
- Opened: 19 August 2013; 12 years ago
- Elevation AMSL: 3,203 m / 10,509 ft
- Coordinates: 34°48′38″N 102°38′41″E

Map
- Location of airport in Gansu

Runways
Direction	Length		Surface
Direction	m	ft	Surface
10/28	3,200	10,499

Statistics (2021)
- Passengers: 88,502
- Aircraft movements: 1,552
- Cargo (metric tons): 12.5

Gannan Xiahe Airport
- Simplified Chinese: 甘南夏河机场
- Traditional Chinese: 甘南夏河機場
Transcriptions
Standard Mandarin
- Hanyu Pinyin: Gānnán Xiàhé Jīchǎng

Gannan Xiahe Airport (IATA: GXH, ICAO: ZLXH) is an airport in Gannan Tibetan Autonomous Prefecture, Gansu Province, China. It is located above Amuquhu Town (Amqog) in Xiahe County, 72 kilometres (45 mi) from the county seat and 56 km (35 mi) from Hezuo, the capital of Gannan Prefecture. Construction started in September 2010 with a total investment of 722 million yuan, and the airport was opened on 19 August 2013.

== Facilities ==
The airport has a 3,200-meter runway and a 3,000-square-meter terminal building. It is projected to handle 140,000 passengers annually by 2020.

== Airlines and destinations ==
Airlines	Destinations
Sichuan Airlines	Chengdu–Tianfu, Lhasa, Xi'an

== See also ==
- List of airports in China
- List of the busiest airports in China
- List of highest airports
