= Zhouqu County =

Zhouqu County 舟曲县 · འབྲུག་ཆུ་རྫོང་། Zhugqu, Zhugchu
- County
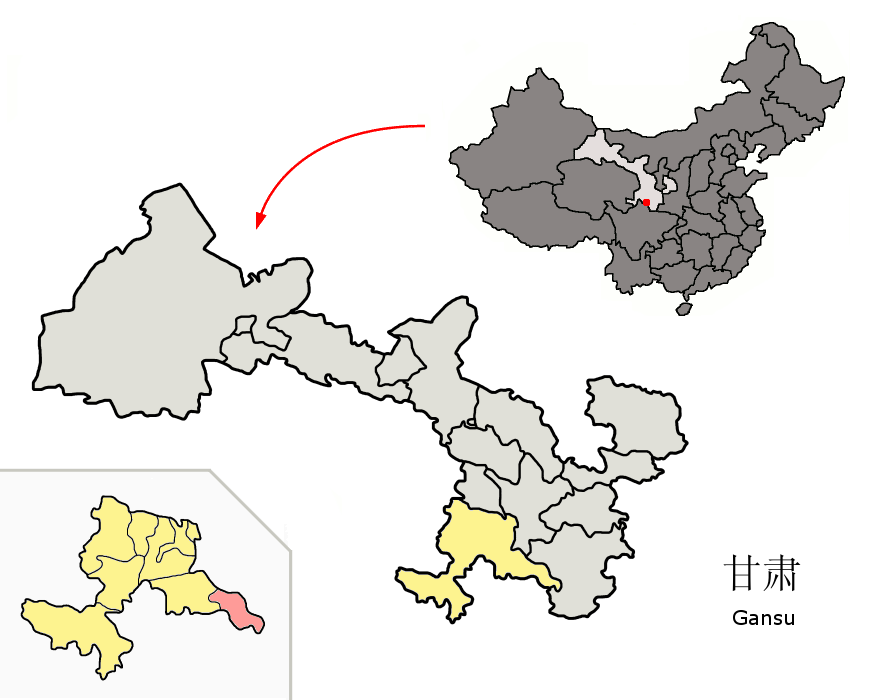
- Zhugqu County (pink) within Gannan Prefecture (yellow) and Gansu

- Location of the seat in Gansu Zhugqu (China)
- Coordinates (Zhouqu government): 33°47′37″N 104°15′05″E
- Country: China
- Province: Gansu
- Autonomous prefecture: Gannan
- County seat: Chengguan (Chêngoin)

Area
  - Total: 3,010 km^{2} (1,160 sq mi)

Population (2020)
  - Total: 125,367
  - Density: 41.7/km^{2} (108/sq mi)
- Time zone: UTC+8 (China Standard)
- Postal code: 746300
- Website: www.zqx.gov.cn

Zhouqu County

Chinese name
- Simplified Chinese: 舟曲县
- Traditional Chinese: 舟曲縣
Transcriptions
Standard Mandarin
- Hanyu Pinyin: Zhōuqū Xiàn

Tibetan name
- Tibetan: འབྲུག་ཆུ་རྫོང་།
Transcriptions
- Wylie: brug chu rdzong
- Tibetan Pinyin: Zhugqu Zong

Zhugqu County (Tibetan: འབྲུག་ཆུ་རྫོང་།), Zhugchu or Zhouqu (Chinese: 舟曲县) is a county in the eastern extremity of the Gannan Tibetan Autonomous Prefecture in the south of Gansu Province, China, with the Bailong River flowing through its confines; it borders Sichuan province to the south. In 2010 its population was 134,000 people.

The word "Zhugqu" derived from the Tibetan name of Bailong River.

== 2010 mudslide ==
On 8 August 2010, deadly mudflows caused by torrential rain struck the county and killed at least 1,471 people. It has been said by some experts; such as Professor Fan Xiao, a Sichuan-based geologist; that the scale of the disaster was affected by deforestation and the construction of dams for hydro-electricity in the area.

According to historical records, Chengguan Town has been struck by 11 "devastating" mudflows since 1823.

== Administrative divisions ==
Zhouqu County is divided to 15 towns and 4 townships.

Name	Simplified Chinese	Hanyu Pinyin	Tibetan	Wylie	Administrative division code
Towns
Chengguan Town (Chêngoin)	城关镇	Liǔlín Zhèn	ཁྲེན་ཀོན་གྲོང་རྡལ།	khren kon grong rdal	623023100
Dachuan Town (Dachoin)	大川镇	Dàchuān Zhèn	ཏ་ཁྲོན་གྲོང་རྡལ།	ta khron grong rdal	623023101
Fengdie Town (Bündie)	峰迭镇	Fēngdié Zhèn	སྦུན་ཏིའེ་གྲོང་རྡལ།	sbun tiʼe grong rdal	623023102
Luzê Town (Lijie)	立节镇	Lìjié Zhèn	གླུ་རྩེད་གྲོང་རྡལ།	glu rtsed grong rdal	623023103
Dongshan Town (Dungshain)	东山镇	Dōngshān Zhèn	ཏུང་ཧྲན་གྲོང་རྡལ།	tung hran grong rdal	623023104
Qugarna Town (Qugaona)	曲告纳镇	Qūgàonà Zhèn	ཆུ་གར་ན་གྲོང་རྡལ།	chu gar na grong rdal	623023105
Poiyü Town (Boyü, Boyu)	博峪镇	Bóyù Zhèn	བོད་ཡུལ་གྲོང་རྡལ།	bod yul grong rdal	623023106
Bazong Town (Bazang)	巴藏镇	Bāzàng Zhèn	སྦྲ་རྫོང་གྲོང་རྡལ།	sbra rdzong grong rdal	623023107
Hanban Town (Hainbain)	憨班镇	Hānbān Zhèn	ཧན་པན་གྲོང་རྡལ།	han pan grong rdal	623023108
Pingding Town (Pinding)	坪定镇	Píngdìng Zhèn	ཕིན་ཏིང་གྲོང་རྡལ།	phin ting grong rdal	623023109
Goye Town (Goyai)	果耶镇	Guǒyē Zhèn	སྒོ་གཡས་གྲོང་རྡལ།	sgo g.yas grong rdal	623023110
Wuping Town (Wupin)	武坪镇	Wǔpíng Zhèn	ཝུའུ་ཕིན་གྲོང་རྡལ།	wuʼu phin grong rdal	623023111
Dagyü Town (Dayu)	大峪镇	Dàyù Zhèn	སྟག་ཡུལ་གྲོང་རྡལ།	stag yul grong rdal	623023112
Jiangpan Town (Jangpain)	江盘镇	Jiāngpán Zhèn	ཅང་ཕན་གྲོང་རྡལ།	cang phan grong rdal	623023113
Gongba Town	拱坝镇	Gǒngbà Zhèn	ཀོང་པ་གྲོང་རྡལ།	kong pa grong rdal	623023114
Townships
Quwar Township (Quwa)	曲瓦乡	Qūwǎ Xiāng	ཆུ་བར་ཤང་།	chu bar shang	623023200
Nanyu Township (Nainyü)	南峪乡	Nányù Xiāng	ནན་ཡུས་ཤང་།	nan yus shang	623023208
Baleng Township (Balêng)	八楞乡	Bāléng Xiāng	པ་ལེང་ཤང་།	pa leng shang	623023210
Chagang Township (Qabgo)	插岗乡	Chāgǎng Xiāng	ཁྲ་ཀང་ཤང་།	khra kang shang	623023212

== Climate ==
Climate data for Zhouqu, elevation 1,329 m (4,360 ft), (1991–2020 normals, extremes 1981–present)
Month	Jan	Feb	Mar	Apr	May	Jun	Jul	Aug	Sep	Oct	Nov	Dec	Year
Record high °C (°F)	16.5 (61.7)	25.3 (77.5)	29.0 (84.2)	32.9 (91.2)	35.3 (95.5)	38.2 (100.8)	38.1 (100.6)	38.0 (100.4)	36.0 (96.8)	27.9 (82.2)	22.9 (73.2)	20.6 (69.1)	38.2 (100.8)
Mean daily maximum °C (°F)	6.9 (44.4)	10.6 (51.1)	15.7 (60.3)	21.4 (70.5)	25.0 (77.0)	28.1 (82.6)	30.1 (86.2)	29.2 (84.6)	24.1 (75.4)	18.6 (65.5)	13.7 (56.7)	8.3 (46.9)	19.3 (66.8)
Daily mean °C (°F)	2.1 (35.8)	5.5 (41.9)	10.1 (50.2)	15.1 (59.2)	18.6 (65.5)	21.9 (71.4)	24.1 (75.4)	23.4 (74.1)	19.0 (66.2)	13.9 (57.0)	8.5 (47.3)	3.0 (37.4)	13.8 (56.8)
Mean daily minimum °C (°F)	−1.7 (28.9)	1.4 (34.5)	5.7 (42.3)	10.2 (50.4)	13.7 (56.7)	17.2 (63.0)	19.6 (67.3)	19.1 (66.4)	15.5 (59.9)	10.6 (51.1)	4.8 (40.6)	−0.8 (30.6)	9.6 (49.3)
Record low °C (°F)	−9.0 (15.8)	−6.5 (20.3)	−4.6 (23.7)	−0.5 (31.1)	3.7 (38.7)	9.3 (48.7)	13.5 (56.3)	11.8 (53.2)	7.3 (45.1)	0.0 (32.0)	−4.5 (23.9)	−9.6 (14.7)	−9.6 (14.7)
Average precipitation mm (inches)	1.9 (0.07)	3.4 (0.13)	14.4 (0.57)	32.5 (1.28)	57.3 (2.26)	64.7 (2.55)	70.5 (2.78)	72.0 (2.83)	59.2 (2.33)	47.9 (1.89)	6.1 (0.24)	0.5 (0.02)	430.4 (16.95)
Average precipitation days (≥ 0.1 mm)	2.7	3.2	8.5	11.5	15.2	14.5	12.7	12.5	13.5	13.8	4.5	1.1	113.7
Average snowy days	5.4	3.5	1.0	0.1	0	0	0	0	0	0	0.6	2.2	12.8
Average relative humidity (%)	53	52	53	54	58	60	63	65	70	71	63	55	60
Mean monthly sunshine hours	135.8	121.6	143.8	168.7	178.7	163.3	184.4	180.5	117.0	112.6	126.5	143.0	1,775.9
Percentage possible sunshine	43	39	38	43	41	38	42	44	32	32	41	47	40
Source: China Meteorological Administrationall-time July record

== See also ==
- List of administrative divisions of Gansu
