= Bikou Dam =

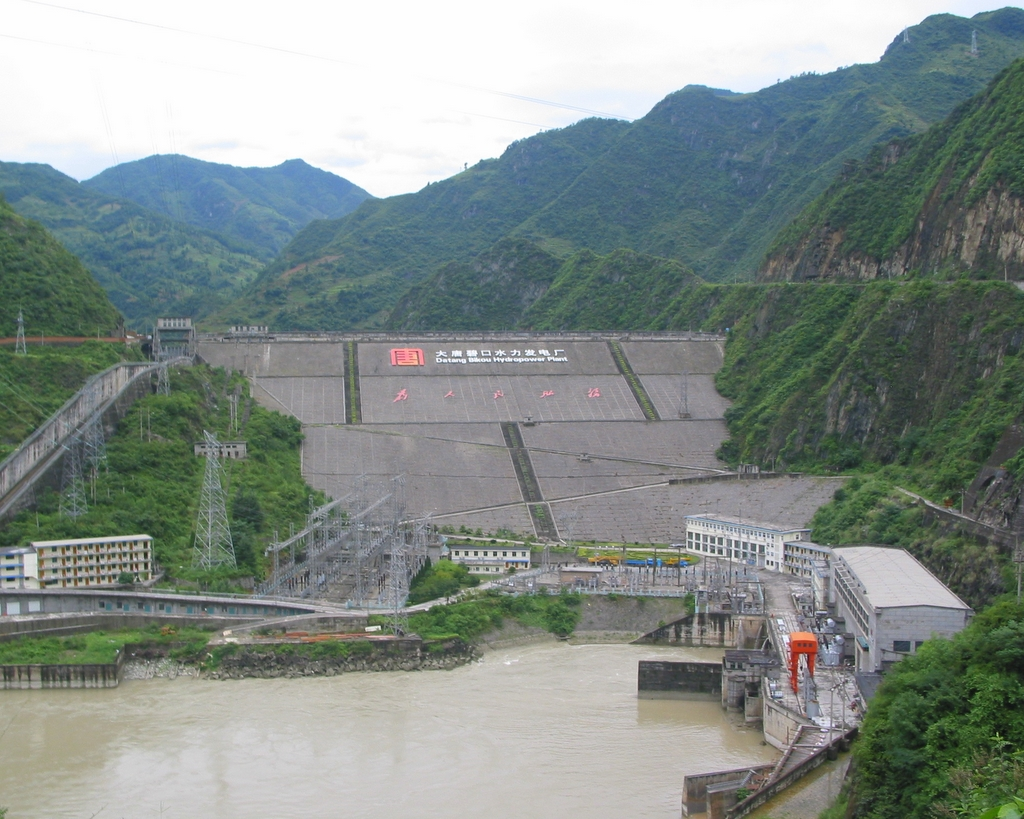

- Location within China
- Country: China
- Location: Bikou
- Coordinates: 32°45′37″N 105°13′27″E
- Status: Operational
- Construction began: 1969
- Opening date: 1977

Dam and spillways
- Type of dam: Embankment, earth-core rock-fill
- Impounds: Bailong River
- Height: 101 m (331 ft)
- Length: 297 m (974 ft)
- Width (crest): 8 m (26 ft)
- Dam volume: 4,241,000 m^{3} (5,547,019 cu yd)
- Spillway capacity: 2,310 m^{3}/s (81,577 cu ft/s)

Reservoir
- Total capacity: 521,000,000 m^{3} (422,382 acre⋅ft)
- Catchment area: 26,000 km^{2} (10,039 sq mi)

Power Station
- Commission date: 1976
- Hydraulic head: 86.2 m (283 ft) (max)
- Turbines: 3 x 100 MW
- Installed capacity: 300 MW
- Annual generation: 1,463 GWh

The Bikou Dam (Chinese: 碧口水电站) is an embankment dam on the Bailong River just upstream of Bikou in Wen County, Gansu Province, China. Construction on the dam began in 1969, the generators were commissioned in 1976 and the dam was complete in 1977. The 101 m (331 ft) tall earth-core rock-fill dam creates a reservoir with a 521,000,000 m^{3} (422,382 acre⋅ft) capacity. The dam supports a 300 MW power station. The dam sustained some damage from the 2008 Sichuan earthquake.

== See also ==
- List of dams and reservoirs in China
- List of major power stations in Gansu
