= Wuping, Gansu =

Wuping 武坪镇
- Town
- Location in Gansu
- Coordinates: 33°37′20″N 104°20′19″E
- Country: People's Republic of China
- Province: Gansu
- Autonomous prefecture: Gannan
- County: Zhugqu
- Time zone: UTC+8 (China Standard)

Wuping (Chinese: 武坪) is a town of Zhugqu County, Gansu, China. As of 2018, it has 9 villages under its administration.

== See also ==
- List of township-level divisions of Gansu
