= Luqu County =

County in Gansu, China

Luqu County ཀླུ་ཆུ་རྫོང་། · 碌曲县
- County
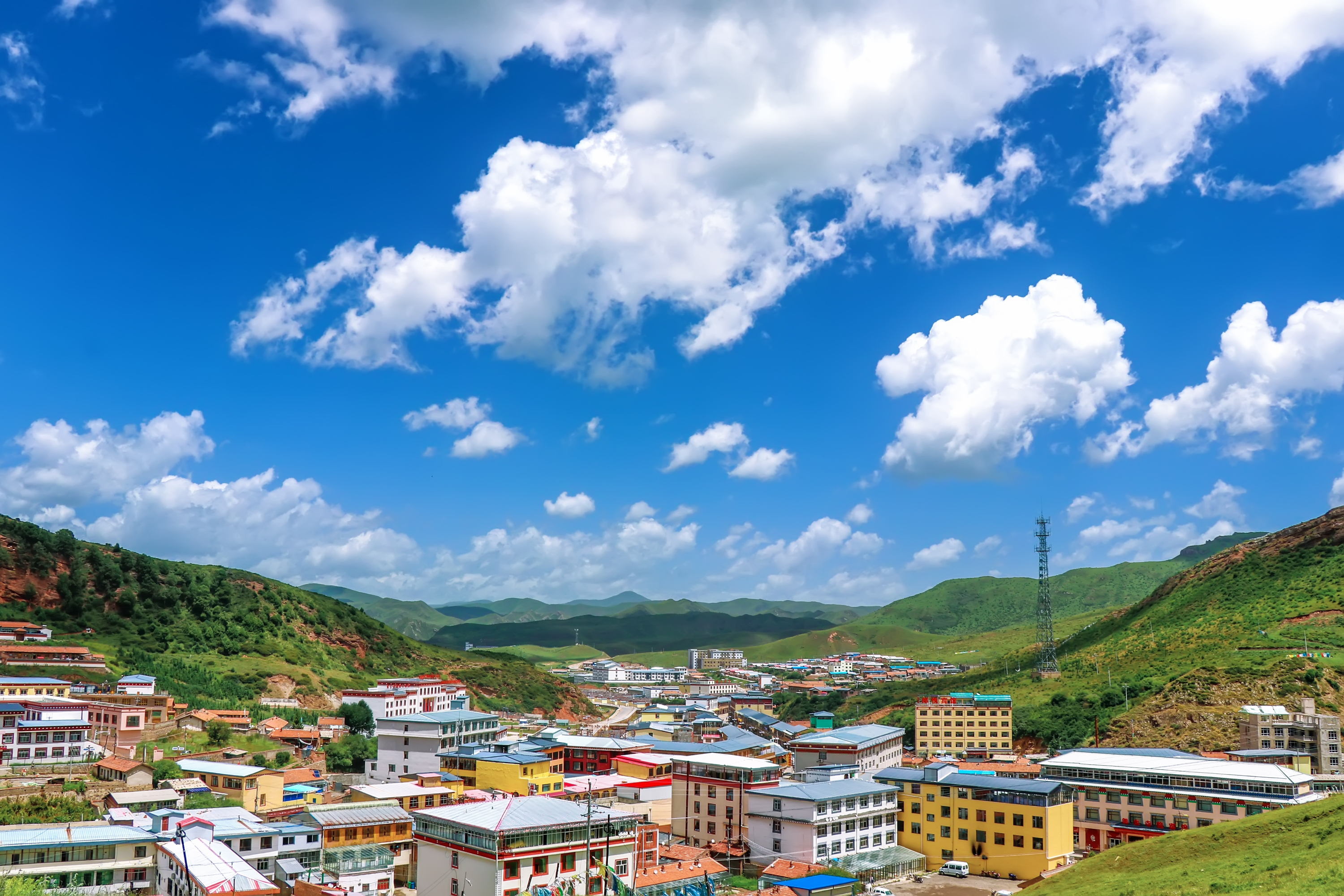
- Kirti Namgyel Dechen Ling (Taktsang Lhamo Monastery)

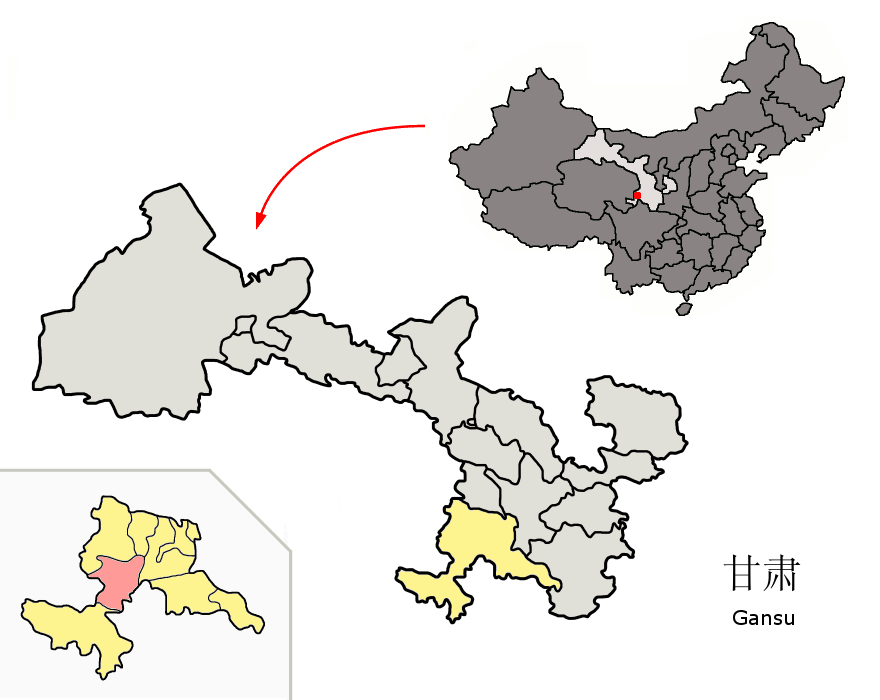
- Luqu County (pink) within Gannan Prefecture (yellow) and Gansu

- Location within Gansu Location within China
- Coordinates (Luqu government): 34°35′27″N 102°29′23″E
- Country: China
- Province: Gansu
- Autonomous prefecture: Gannan
- County seat: Lhamo (Langmusi)

Area
  - Total: 5,298.6 km^{2} (2,045.8 sq mi)

Population (2020)
  - Total: 35,871
  - Density: 6.7699/km^{2} (17.534/sq mi)
- Time zone: UTC+8 (China Standard)
- Postal code: 747200
- Website: www.luqu.gov.cn

Luqu County

Chinese name
- Simplified Chinese: 碌曲县
- Traditional Chinese: 碌曲縣
Transcriptions
Standard Mandarin
- Hanyu Pinyin: Lùqū Xiàn

Tibetan name
- Tibetan: ཀླུ་ཆུ་རྫོང་།
Transcriptions
- Wylie: klu chu rdzong
- Tibetan Pinyin: Luqu Zong

Luqu County (Chinese: 碌曲县, Tibetan: ཀླུ་ཆུ་རྫོང་།) is a county of the Gannan Tibetan Autonomous Prefecture in the south of Gansu province, China, bordering the provinces of Sichuan to the southeast and Qinghai to the west. Its postal code is 717200, and in 1999 its population was 30,039 people. The word "Luqu" derived from the Tibetan name of Tao River.

Kirti Namgyel Dechen Ling (Ganden Shedrub Pekar Drolwailing), a Gelug monastery located in Lhamo (Langmusi), was founded in 1748. It became the seat of the Kirti incarnation line.

== Administrative divisions ==
Luqu County is divided to 5 towns and 2 townships.

Name	Simplified Chinese	Hanyu Pinyin	Tibetan	Wylie	Administrative division code
Towns
Lhamo Town (Langmusi)	郎木寺镇	Lángmùsì Zhèn	ལྷ་མོ་གྲོང་རྡལ།	lha mo grong rdal	623026100
Ma'ngê Town (Ma'ai)	玛艾镇	Mǎ'ài Zhèn	མ་ངེ་གྲོང་རྡལ།	ma nge grong rdal	623026101
Xicang Town	西仓镇	Xīcāng Zhèn	ཤིས་ཚང་གྲོང་རྡལ།	shis tshang grong rdal	623026102
Co'nyin Town (Gahai)	尕海镇	Gǎhǎi Zhèn	མཚོ་ཉིན་གྲོང་རྡལ།	mtsho nyin grong rdal	623026103
Samca Town (Shuangcha)	双岔镇	Shuāngchà Zhèn	ཟམ་ཚ་གྲོང་རྡལ།	zam tsha grong rdal	623026104
Townships
Larigü Township (Larenguan)	拉仁关乡	Lārénguān Xiāng	བླ་རི་མགུལ་ཤང་།	bla ri mgul shang	623026202
Ala Township	阿拉乡	Ālā Xiāng	ཨ་ལ་ཤང་།	a la shang	623026204

== Climate ==
Climate data for Luqu, elevation 3,191 m (10,469 ft), (1991–2020 normals, extremes 1981–2010)
Month	Jan	Feb	Mar	Apr	May	Jun	Jul	Aug	Sep	Oct	Nov	Dec	Year
Record high °C (°F)	16.2 (61.2)	17.2 (63.0)	22.3 (72.1)	26.6 (79.9)	26.4 (79.5)	26.4 (79.5)	29.8 (85.6)	28.8 (83.8)	28.0 (82.4)	24.4 (75.9)	16.9 (62.4)	16.4 (61.5)	29.8 (85.6)
Mean daily maximum °C (°F)	2.7 (36.9)	5.2 (41.4)	8.4 (47.1)	12.6 (54.7)	15.5 (59.9)	17.9 (64.2)	20.2 (68.4)	20.1 (68.2)	16.5 (61.7)	11.7 (53.1)	7.8 (46.0)	4.1 (39.4)	11.9 (53.4)
Daily mean °C (°F)	−8.2 (17.2)	−4.9 (23.2)	−0.5 (31.1)	4.2 (39.6)	7.8 (46.0)	11.0 (51.8)	13.1 (55.6)	12.5 (54.5)	9.0 (48.2)	3.6 (38.5)	−2.3 (27.9)	−7.0 (19.4)	3.2 (37.7)
Mean daily minimum °C (°F)	−16.1 (3.0)	−12.4 (9.7)	−7.0 (19.4)	−2.3 (27.9)	1.8 (35.2)	5.6 (42.1)	7.6 (45.7)	7.3 (45.1)	4.3 (39.7)	−1.6 (29.1)	−9.0 (15.8)	−14.6 (5.7)	−3.0 (26.5)
Record low °C (°F)	−26.1 (−15.0)	−24.2 (−11.6)	−22.9 (−9.2)	−12.9 (8.8)	−9.4 (15.1)	−3.1 (26.4)	−0.6 (30.9)	−3.0 (26.6)	−6.0 (21.2)	−14.3 (6.3)	−19.8 (−3.6)	−25.8 (−14.4)	−26.1 (−15.0)
Average precipitation mm (inches)	5.3 (0.21)	6.5 (0.26)	16.8 (0.66)	31.6 (1.24)	73.5 (2.89)	91.8 (3.61)	119.1 (4.69)	112.3 (4.42)	95.4 (3.76)	47.1 (1.85)	7.3 (0.29)	2.2 (0.09)	608.9 (23.97)
Average precipitation days (≥ 0.1 mm)	4.6	6.1	9.8	11.9	17.2	20.0	17.8	17.4	18.0	14.8	4.7	2.7	145
Average snowy days	7.4	8.9	13.7	11.3	4.8	0.6	0.1	0	1.1	9.8	6.9	5.3	69.9
Average relative humidity (%)	51	52	57	60	65	71	74	76	77	72	60	51	64
Mean monthly sunshine hours	202.5	183.1	198.9	203.3	201.4	177.6	193.4	190.4	149.4	175.4	204.6	211.0	2,291
Percentage possible sunshine	64	59	53	52	46	41	44	46	41	51	67	69	53
Source: China Meteorological Administration

== Transport ==
- China National Highway 213

== See also ==
- List of administrative divisions of Gansu
