= Xiahe County =

Xiahe County 夏河县 · བསང་ཆུ་རྫོང་། Sangqu
- County
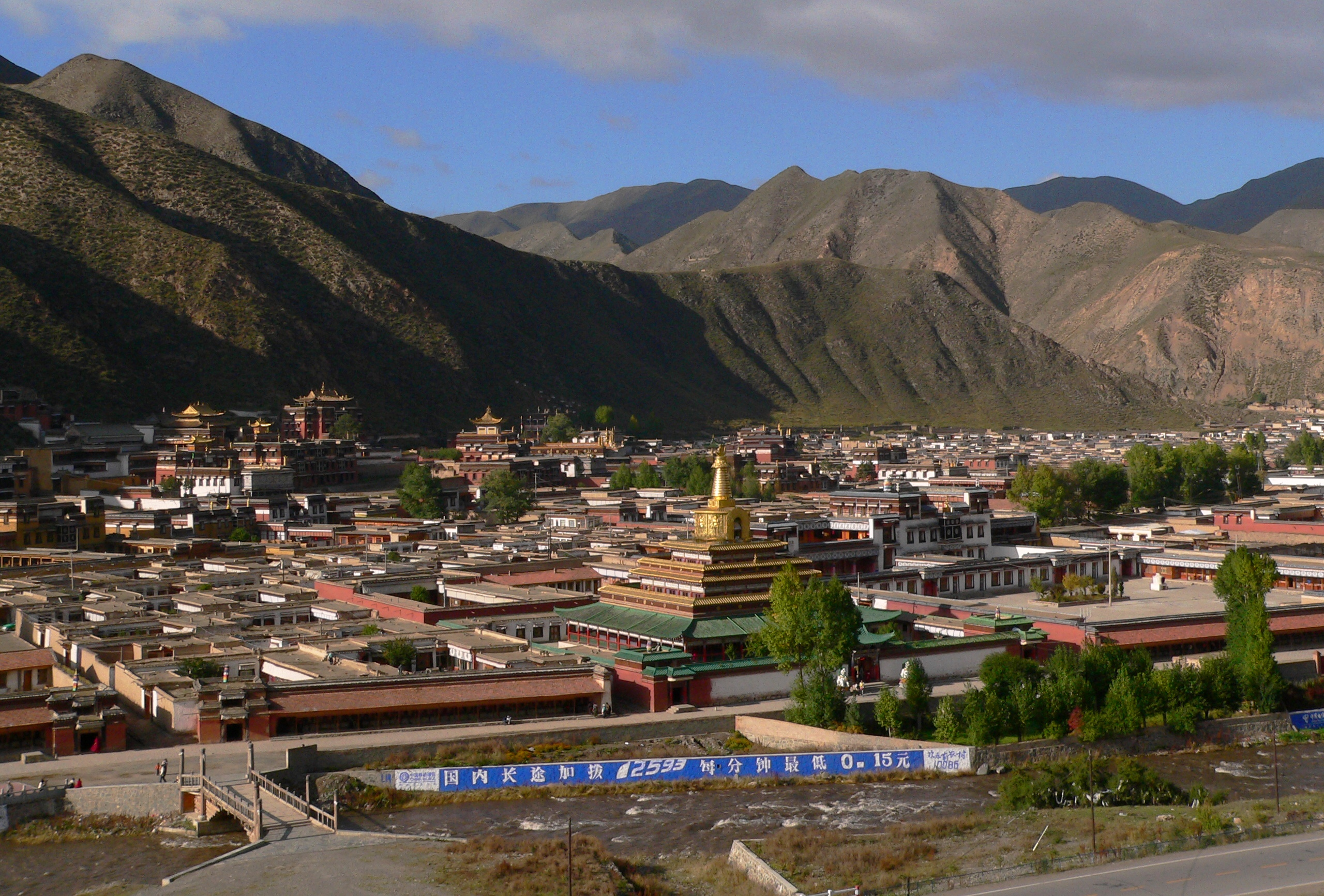
- Labrang Monastery

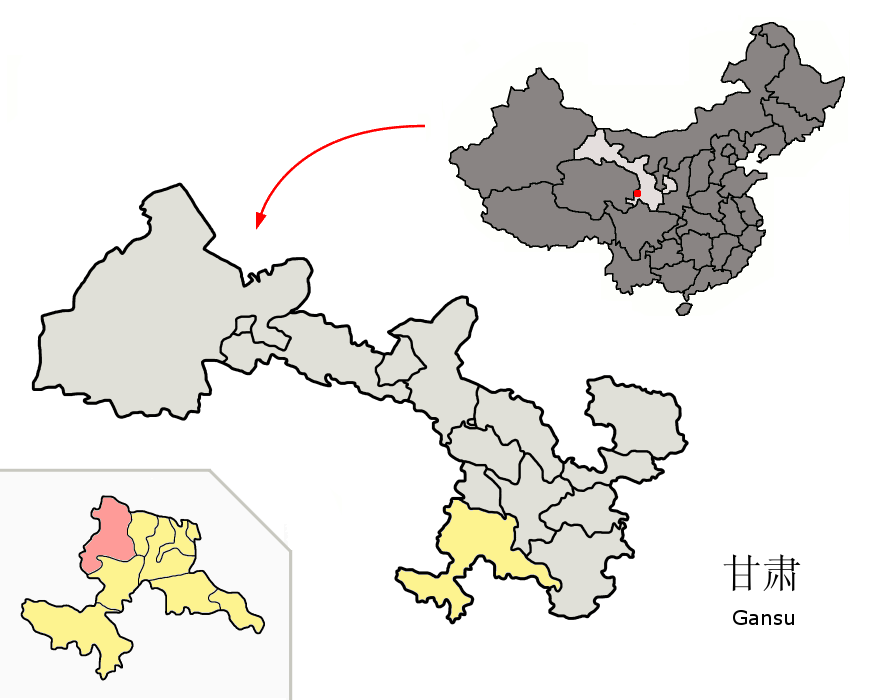
- Xiahe County (red) within Gannan Prefecture (yellow) and Gansu

- Location within Gansu Location within China
- Coordinates (Xiahe County government): 35°12′00″N 102°31′03″E
- Country: China
- Province: Gansu
- Autonomous prefecture: Gannan
- County seat: Labrang

Area
  - Total: 6,274 km^{2} (2,422 sq mi)

Population (2020)
  - Total: 86,355
  - Density: 13.76/km^{2} (35.65/sq mi)
- Time zone: UTC+8 (China Standard)
- Postal code: 747100
- Website: www.xiahe.gov.cn

Xiahe County

Chinese name
- Simplified Chinese: 夏河县
- Traditional Chinese: 夏河縣
Transcriptions
Standard Mandarin
- Hanyu Pinyin: Xiàhé Xiàn

Tibetan name
- Tibetan: བསང་ཆུ་རྫོང་།
Transcriptions
- Wylie: bsang chu rdzong
- Tibetan Pinyin: Sangchu Zong

Xiahe County (Chinese: 夏河县; pinyin: Xiàhé Xiàn; Tibetan: བསང་ཆུ་རྫོང་།, Amdo Tibetan pronunciation: [saŋ tɕʰə dzoŋ]) is a county in Gannan Tibetan Autonomous Prefecture, Gansu province, China, bordering Qinghai province to the west. The name (both Chinese and Tibetan), which literally means "Xia River", refers to the Daxia River which runs through the county. It is home to the famed Labrang Tibetan Buddhist monastery, one of the largest Tibetan Buddhist monasteries outside the Tibet Autonomous Region. It is also the site of Bajiaocheng, an archeological site famous for the distinctive shape of its city walls. The county is populated largely by ethnic Tibetans, as well as some Hui and Han Chinese. The area is highly rural and pastoral (including yak and other animal rearing). The geography is mountainous. Over the past decades it has become a tourist attraction. The county was named Xiahe in 1928, after the Daxia River that flows through its territory.

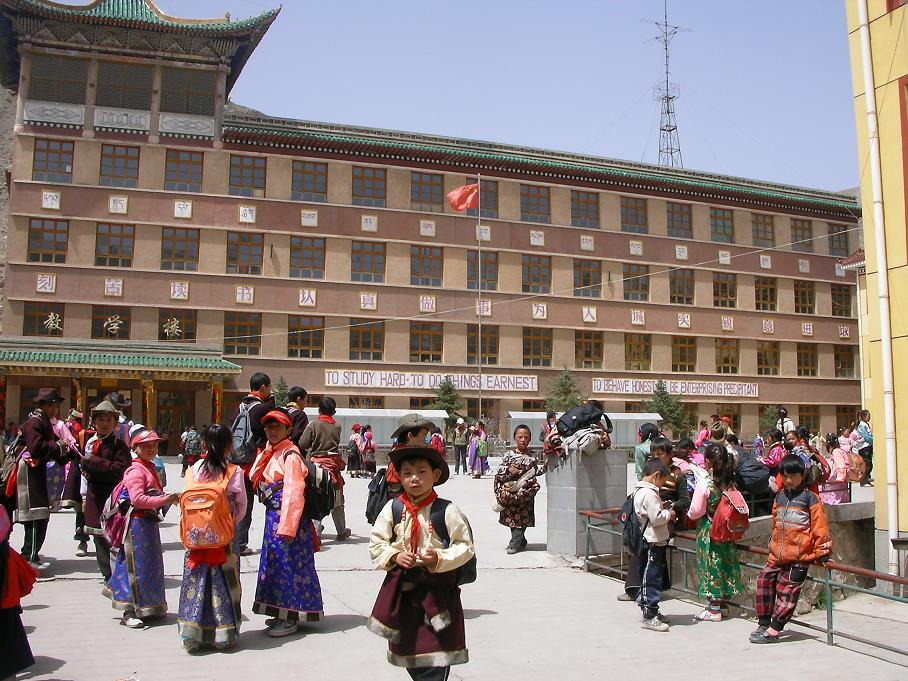
Xiahe school (note the mottos in English, Chinese, and Tibetan)

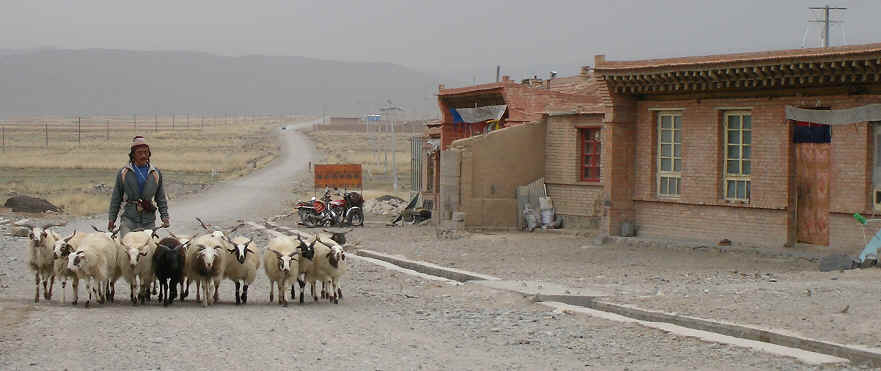
Near Sangkog, Gansu Province

== History ==
Xiahe (Sangqu) used to be part of Qinghai when it was under the control of Chinese Muslim General Ma Qi. It was the site of bloody battles between Muslim and Tibetan forces.

In 1980, Xiahe mandible, a hominin fossil jaw, was discovered in Baishiya Karst Cave, Xiahe County.

== Location ==
Xiahe (Sangqu) is found in the southern portion of Gansu province, along the western border with Qinghai province. It lies along the Daxia and Zhao rivers. It is on the northeast edge of the Tibetan Plateau. The average elevation is 2,900 to 3,100 m (9,500 to 10,200 ft) with the highest being 4,636 m (15,210 ft) and the lowest 2,160 m (7,087 ft).

=== Climate ===
Xiahe County has an alpine subarctic climate (Köppen Dwc) that grades into an alpine climate (ETH) at the highest elevations. The climate is characterised by mild, rainy summers and frigid, but dry and sunny, winters.

Climate data for Xiahe, elevation 2,948 m (9,672 ft), (1991–2020 normals, extremes 1981–2010)
Month	Jan	Feb	Mar	Apr	May	Jun	Jul	Aug	Sep	Oct	Nov	Dec	Year
Record high °C (°F)	16.0 (60.8)	18.8 (65.8)	23.8 (74.8)	29.1 (84.4)	26.4 (79.5)	28.2 (82.8)	30.7 (87.3)	29.2 (84.6)	28.6 (83.5)	23.8 (74.8)	18.4 (65.1)	14.5 (58.1)	30.7 (87.3)
Mean daily maximum °C (°F)	2.2 (36.0)	4.8 (40.6)	8.6 (47.5)	13.1 (55.6)	15.9 (60.6)	18.7 (65.7)	20.9 (69.6)	20.6 (69.1)	16.7 (62.1)	12.0 (53.6)	7.9 (46.2)	3.8 (38.8)	12.1 (53.8)
Daily mean °C (°F)	−8.0 (17.6)	−4.9 (23.2)	−0.3 (31.5)	4.7 (40.5)	8.5 (47.3)	11.9 (53.4)	13.9 (57.0)	13.3 (55.9)	9.5 (49.1)	4.0 (39.2)	−1.8 (28.8)	−6.7 (19.9)	3.7 (38.6)
Mean daily minimum °C (°F)	−15.2 (4.6)	−11.9 (10.6)	−6.6 (20.1)	−1.6 (29.1)	2.7 (36.9)	6.4 (43.5)	8.5 (47.3)	8.1 (46.6)	4.8 (40.6)	−1.0 (30.2)	−8.1 (17.4)	−13.8 (7.2)	−2.3 (27.8)
Record low °C (°F)	−24.8 (−12.6)	−22.9 (−9.2)	−19.9 (−3.8)	−11.8 (10.8)	−9.4 (15.1)	−1.4 (29.5)	1.3 (34.3)	−0.4 (31.3)	−5.5 (22.1)	−12.4 (9.7)	−19.0 (−2.2)	−26.0 (−14.8)	−26.0 (−14.8)
Average precipitation mm (inches)	2.9 (0.11)	4.2 (0.17)	11.1 (0.44)	26.1 (1.03)	60.7 (2.39)	65.3 (2.57)	96.4 (3.80)	81.5 (3.21)	72.4 (2.85)	31.6 (1.24)	4.3 (0.17)	1.3 (0.05)	457.8 (18.03)
Average precipitation days (≥ 0.1 mm)	3.6	4.8	7.9	10.2	15.5	17.5	17.2	15.7	16.3	11.6	3.3	2.0	125.6
Average snowy days	5.7	7.2	11.2	9.7	3.5	0.4	0.1	0.1	0.7	6.5	5.5	3.8	54.4
Average relative humidity (%)	45	47	51	55	61	67	71	73	74	68	53	44	59
Mean monthly sunshine hours	192.5	187.4	215.2	218.1	208.2	189.7	207.4	203.2	164.7	184.8	196.1	194.8	2,362.1
Percentage possible sunshine	61	60	58	55	48	44	47	49	45	54	64	64	54
Source: China Meteorological Administration

== Administrative divisions ==
Xiahe County is divided to 8 towns and 5 townships.

Name	Simplified Chinese	Hanyu Pinyin	Tibetan	Wylie	Administrative division code
Towns
Labrang Town (Lazhang, Labuleng)	拉卜楞镇	Lābǔléng Zhèn	བླ་བྲང་གྲོང་རྡལ།	bla brang grong rdal	623027100
Panggurtang Town (Wangge'ertang)	王格尔塘镇	Wánggé'ěrtáng Zhèn	བང་གུར་ཐང་གྲོང་རྡལ།	bang gur thang grong rdal	623027101
Amqog Town (Amuquhu)	阿木去乎镇	Āmùqùhū Zhèn	ཨ་མཆོག་གྲོང་རྡལ།	a mchog grong rdal	623027102
Sangkog Town (Sangke)	桑科镇	Sāngkē Zhèn	བསང་ཁོག་གྲོང་རྡལ།	bsang khog grong rdal	623027103
Gain'gya Town (Ganjia)	甘加镇	Gānjiā Zhèn	རྒན་གྱ་གྲོང་རྡལ།	rgan gya grong rdal	623027104
Martang Town (Madang)	麻当镇	Mádāng Zhèn	མར་ཐང་གྲོང་རྡལ།	mar thang grong rdal	623027105
Bora Town (Bola)	博拉镇	Bólā Zhèn	འབོ་ར་གྲོང་རྡལ།	'bo ra grong rdal	623027106
Kocê Town (Kecai)	科才镇	Kēcái Zhèn	ཁོ་ཚེ་གྲོང་རྡལ།	kho tshe grong rdal	623027107
Townships
Damê Township (Damai)	达麦乡	Dámài Xiāng	མདའ་མེད་ཤང་།	mda' med shang	623027202
Qu'ngoin Township (Qu'ao)	曲奥乡	Qū'ào Xiāng	ཆུ་སྔོན་ཤང་།	chu sngon shang	623027204
Tanggarnang Township (Tangga'ang)	唐尕昂乡	Tánggǎ'áng Xiāng	ཐང་དཀར་ནང་ཤང་།	thang dkar nang shang	623027205
Jayü Township (Zhayou)	扎油乡	Zhāyóu Xiāng	ཅ་ཡུས་ཤང་།	ca yus shang	623027206
Gyicang Township (Jicang)	吉仓乡	Jícāng Xiāng	སྐྱིས་ཚང་ཤང་།	skyis tshang shang	623027208
