= Chone Monastery =

Monastery est. 1269 in Gansu, China

- Tibetan transcription(s); Tibetan: ཅོ་ནེ་དགོན་ཆེན; Other transcriptions: Chone Gonchen Ganden Shedrubling, Choni Monastery; Chinese transcription(s); Traditional: 卓尼; Pinyin: Zhuōní
- Location within China

Religion
- Affiliation: Tibetan Buddhism
- Sect: Gelug
- Deity: Tsongkhapa
- Festival: Cham-nyon-wa

Location
- Location: Jonê County, Gannan Tibetan Autonomous Prefecture, Gansu, China
- Country: China
- Interactive map of Chone Monastery
- Coordinates: 34.5963°N 103.5048°E

Architecture
- Founder: Drogon Ghogyel Phakpa and his Mongol patron, Kublai Khan
- Established: 1269

Chone Monastery (Tibetan: Wylie:; Chinese: Jonê; Pinyin: Zhuōní), also Chone Gonchen Ganden Shedrubling, or Choni Monastery was originally a Sakya monastery. It is situated adjacent to Liulin, Jonê County, Gannan Tibetan Autonomous Prefecture, Gansu Province, China, at an altitude of about 2,610 m (8,563 ft).

== History ==
"There are traditions of Tibetan soldiers left behind [after the late 10th century] at several border outposts, such as Chone, where they established viable settlements, and of the remaining Tibetan conscript troops, called the Wun Mo, carving out considerable territory for themselves until they were perhaps absorbed into that amalgam of people of Tibetan stock, which came to form the Hsi Hsia Kingdom (982–1224)."

Chone Monastery was founded in 1269 by Drogon Ghogyel Phakpa (1235–1280) and his Mongol patron, Kublai Khan or (Qubilai Qan), in 1269 CE as a Sakya monastery.

Chone Monastery was part of a separate kingdom formed, according to legend, after its invasion by Chinese warriors who migrated across the mountains from Sichuan conquering the local tribes in 1404. The Yongle Emperor (May 2, 1360 – August 12, 1424) named one of them hereditary chief, bestowing the name of "Yang" and an imperial seal upon them and the prince established a palace on the north bank of the Tao River. The Yang family, continued to rule over 48 unruly Tibetan clans in Chone as a semi-independent kingdom from the early 15th century for 23 generations, until 1928, when it was placed under the control of the Lanzhou government.

Phakpa, who was trusted to rule Tibet by the Mongol Emperor of the Yuan Dynasty, Kublai Khan, visited the area which, until that time was mainly under the influence of the ancient Bon religion. In 1459 the monastery was converted to the Gelug sect by Choje Rinchen Lingpo.

Its colleges were established in the 18th century by Kunkyen Jigme Wangpo. with the School of Dialectics (Tsenyl Dratsang) being founded in 1714 and the Tantric (Vajrayana) college (Gyupa Dratsang) in 1729.

== Description ==
The monastery is situated near a bend in the rushing, clear, Tao River surrounded by high wooded mountains, adjacent to the fairly large Liulin, which has a mixed population of Tibetans and Chinese, though the Chinese now predominate. In 1923, the village had "approximately four hundred Tibetan families and had changed very little since its founding six centuries before."

"At the entrance to the [monastery] complex is a Chinese pavilion, containing a stele inscribed in Tibetan and Chinese which commemorates the history of the monastery and its expansion under Manchu patronage during the 18th century."

Within the grounds are six large buildings – only one of which has been ruined (to the left). The Assembly Hall is in the centre with the Gyupa Dratsang is to the right and behind are the Tsenyi Dratsang, the Chora (Debating Garden), the Taknyi Lhakhang which is dedicated to Hevajra and the Sariwa Lhakhang. The monastery was famed for its 1773 woodblock editions of the Kangyur and Tangyur, copies of which still exist though, unfortunately, the original woodblocks have been damaged beyond repair.

When the monastery was visited by Janet Elliott Wulsin and her husband, Frederick Wulsin, in 1923, Chone Monastery had survived numerous earthquakes. On the main gate was an inscription composed by the Kangxi Emperor (4 May 1654 – 20 December 1722) in 1710 which read: "Bestowed by Imperial Command, Temple of Tranquillity" as a favour to a local lama who had visited him in Beijing and returned with 3,000 taels (each approximately 37 grams) of silver, which he used to erect buildings in the monastery. At one time there were 172 buildings including ten chanting halls within the monastery and 3,800 monks. By 1923 the population was only about 700.

"Inside the oldest of Choni's chanting halls, dating back five hundred years, Janet and Frederick discovered the enormous gilded figure of Tsongkhapa with his two disciples. Legend had it that Tsongkhapa had appeared on the stone altar of the monastery in 1714, and, after addressing the crowd on the greatness of his church, became transfigured and ascended into heaven."

The monastery now has only about 120 monks which gives it a rather deserted atmosphere.

== Festival ==
On the sixth day of the sixth moon (in August/September) the spectacular Cham-ngyon-wa, or "Old Dance," is celebrated at the monastery, representing the souls of the departed.
