= Jonê County =

County in Gansu Province, China

Jonê County 卓尼县 · ཅོ་ནེ་རྫོང་། Zhuoni, Cone, Chone, Choni
- County
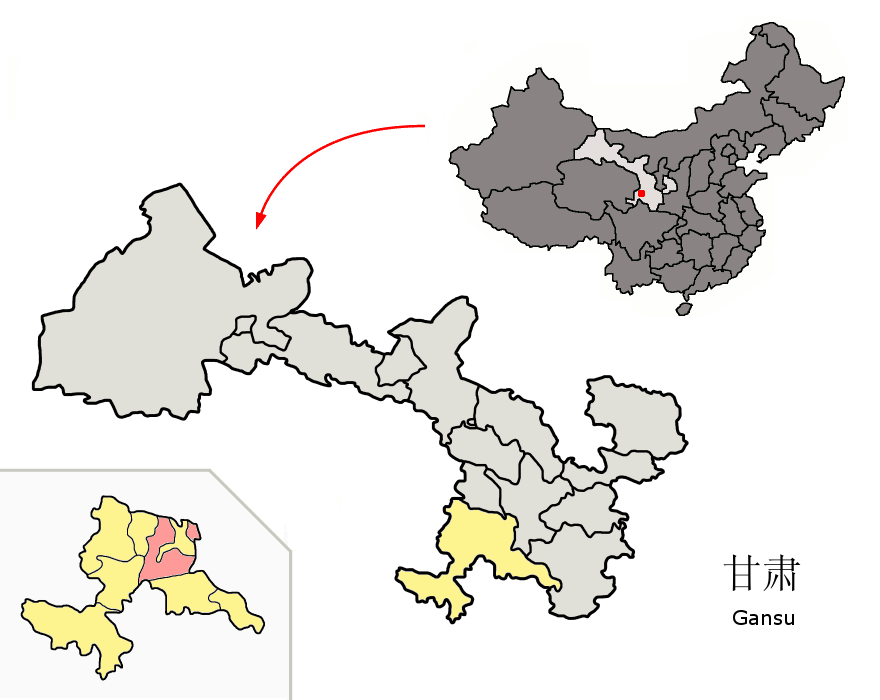
- Jonê (pink) within Gannan Tibetan Autonomous Prefecture (yellow) and Gansu (grey)

- Location of the seat in Gansu Jonê (China)
- Coordinates: 34°35′N 103°30′E
- Country: China
- Province: Gansu
- Autonomous prefecture: Gannan
- County seat: Liulin

Area
  - Total: 5,419.68 km^{2} (2,092.55 sq mi)

Population (2020)
  - Total: 95,387
  - Density: 17.600/km^{2} (45.584/sq mi)
- Time zone: UTC+8 (China Standard)
- Postal code: 747600
- Website: www.zhuoni.gov.cn

Jonê County

Chinese name
- Simplified Chinese: 卓尼县
- Traditional Chinese: 卓尼縣
Transcriptions
Standard Mandarin
- Hanyu Pinyin: Zhuōní Xiàn

Tibetan name
- Tibetan: ཅོ་ནེ་རྫོང་།
Transcriptions
- Wylie: co ne rdzong
- Tibetan Pinyin: Jonê Zong

Jonê County (also Cone, Chone, Choni; Tibetan: ཅོ་ནེ་རྫོང་།, Wylie: co-ne rdzong, ZWPY: Jonê Zong; local pronunciation: /tɕɔ^{L}nɛ/; Chinese: 卓尼县; pinyin: Zhuōní Xiàn) is a county in the Gannan Tibetan Autonomous Prefecture, Gansu Province, China. Its postal code is 747600. Its area is 4,954 km^{2} (1,913 sq mi), and its population is over 100,000 people. It is administered from Liulin.

== Description ==
The county covers both banks of the middle section of the Lu-chu. The country town and adjacent Jonê Monastery are on the north bank. The side valleys on the southern side used to be branches of the ancient kingdom of Jonê.

== Historical Tibetan Jonê Kingdom ==
Among Tibetan at Amdo, Jonê exist the Jonê Kingdom (Tibetan: ཅོ་ནེ་དཔོན་པོ, Wylie: co-ne-dpon-po, Chinese: 卓尼土司; pinyin: Zhuóní Tǔsī), ruled by the Tibetan Ga clan or Mandarin Chinese Yang (杨) clan, was a Tusi chiefdom kingdom called Zhouni Kingdom, Choni Kingdom, or Jonê Kingdom ruled by the Gatsang (dga' tshang) family at Tibet. In 1404, whereupon they informed the Ming Emperor Yongle of this fact and were recognized as local rulers, and were given a seal of authority and the surname Yang (杨). The Yangs ruled Jonê from 1404 until 1949.

== List of Kings of Jonê ==
There are list kings of Jonê Kingdom:

1. ཅོ་ནེ་རྒྱལ་པོ་ཤིས་བསྡུས།
2. ཅོ་ནེ་རྒྱལ་པོ་བཙན་པོ།
3. ཅོ་ནེ་རྒྱལ་པོ་བཀྲ་ཤིས།
4. ཅོ་ནེ་རྒྱལ་པོ་དགའ་སྐྱེད།
5. ཅོ་ནེ་རྒྱལ་པོ་དབང་ཕྱུག named 杨洪; Yáng Hóng
6. ཅོ་ནེ་རྒྱལ་པོ་ཡང་དྲིན། named 杨臻; Yáng Zhēn
7. ཅོ་ནེ་རྒྱལ་པོ་ཡང་ཚེ་མེས། named 杨葵明; Yáng Kuímíng
8. ཅོ་ནེ་རྒྱལ་པོ་ཡང་གོ་ལུང་། named 杨国龙; Yáng Guólóng
9. ཅོ་ནེ་རྒྱལ་པོ་ཚེ་དབང་དོན་གྲུབ། named 杨朝梁; Yáng Cháoliáng
10. ཅོ་ནེ་རྒྱལ་པོ་བློ་བཟང་དོན་གྲུབ། named 杨威; Yáng Wēi
11. ཅོ་ནེ་རྒྱལ་པོ་མང་སྲོལ་མགོན་པོ། named 杨汝松; Yáng Rǔsōng
12. ཅོ་ནེ་རྒྱལ་པོ་འཇམ་དབྱངས་ནོར་བུ། named 杨冲霄; Yáng Chōngxiāo
13. ཅོ་ནེ་རྒྱལ་པོ་བསོད་ནམས་ཆོས་འཕེལ། named 杨昭; Yáng Zhāo
14. ཅོ་ནེ་རྒྱལ་པོ་བསྟན་སྲུང་ཚེ་རིང་། named 杨声; Yáng Shēng
15. ཅོ་ནེ་རྒྱལ་པོ་བསྟན་འཛིན་རིན་ཆེན་ཆོས་སྐྱབས། named 杨宗业; Yáng Zōngyè
16. ཅོ་ནེ་རྒྱལ་པོ་ཆོས་སྐྱབས་འགྱུར་མེད་རྡོ་རྗེ། named 杨宗基; Yáng Zōngjī
17. ཅོ་ནེ་རྒྱལ་པོ་རིན་ཆེན་བསྟན་འཛིན་འཕྲིན་ལས་རྡོ་རྗེ། named 杨元; Yáng Yuán
18. ཅོ་ནེ་རྒྱལ་པོ་ཚེ་དབང་བསོད་ནམས་རྡོ་རྗེ། named 杨作霖; Yáng Zuòlín
19. ཅོ་ནེ་རྒྱལ་པོ་བློ་བཟང་བསྟན་འཛིན་རྣམ་རྒྱལ་རྡོ་རྗེ། named 杨积庆; Yáng Jīqìng
20. ཅོ་ནེ་རྒྱལ་པོ་པད་མ་དབང་ཕྱུག named 杨复兴; Yáng Fùxīng

== History ==
"There are traditions of Tibetan soldiers left behind [after the late 10th century] at several border outposts, such as Jonê, where they established viable settlements, and of the remaining Tibetan conscript troops, called the Wun Mo, carving out considerable territory for themselves until they were perhaps absorbed into that amalgam of people of Tibetan stock, which came to form the Hsi Hsia Kingdom (982—1224)."

Jonê was part of a separate kingdom formed, according to legend, after its invasion by warriors who migrated across the mountains from Sichuan conquering the local tribes in 1404. The contemporary descendants of the Jonê royal line claim that their line is Tibetan, and that their ancestors migrated from central Tibet through Sichuan.

The Yongle Emperor (May 2, 1360 – August 12, 1424) named one of these invading warriors hereditary chief (tusi) called Zhouni Tusi (卓尼土司), bestowing the family name of "Yang" ("杨") and an imperial seal upon his line. The Jonê king (co-ne rgyal-po) established a palace on the north bank of the Tao River. The family holding the Yang seal continued to rule over 48 Tibetan clans in Jonê as an autonomous kingdom from the early 15th century for 23 generations, until 1928, when it was placed under the control of the Lanzhou government. In the late Qing Dynasty and Republican Period, many nomadic regions had considerable de facto independence, despite the claims and perspective of the Chinese rulers.

Among the six monasteries in the county, all of them Tibetan Geluk establishments, is the great Jonê Monastery.

The American botanist Joseph Rock spent almost 2 years in Jonê ("Choni", in his spelling) in 1925–26. He resided in the compound of the local chief (the 19th-generation tusi Yang Jiqing (杨积庆)), making it the base for his exploration of southern Gansu and eastern Qinghai. His account of the culture of this "almost unknown Tibetan principality", as he described it, illustrated with color photographs, was published in the National Geographic.

As of 2012, Jonê was apparently closed to foreign visitors.

== Administrative divisions ==
Jonê County is divided to 11 towns, 3 townships and 1 ethnic township.

Name	Simplified Chinese	Hanyu Pinyin	Tibetan	Wylie	Administrative division code
Towns
Liulin Town (Jangcai)	柳林镇	Liǔlín Zhèn	ལྕང་ཚལ་གྲོང་རྡལ།	lcang tshal grong rdal	623022100
Maru Town (Mu'er)	木耳镇	Mù'ěr Zhèn	མ་རུ་གྲོང་རྡལ།	ma ru grong rdal	623022101
Chagkoglung Town (Chakunglung, Zhagulu)	扎古录镇	Zhāgǔlù Zhèn	བྲག་ཁོག་ལུང་གྲོང་རྡལ།	brag khog lung grong rdal	623022102
Karqên Town (Ka'erqin)	喀尔钦镇	Kā'ěrqīn Zhèn	མཁར་ཆེན་གྲོང་རྡལ།	mkhar chen grong rdal	623022103
Zangbawa Town	藏巴哇镇	Zàngbāwā Zhèn	གཙང་པ་བ་གྲོང་རྡལ།	gtsang pa ba grong rdal	623022104
Nalung Town (Nalang)	纳浪镇	Nàlàng Zhèn	གནའ་ལུང་གྲོང་རྡལ།	gna' lung grong rdal	623022105
Taoyan Town (Lawoxi)	洮砚镇	Táoyàn Zhèn	གླ་བོ་གཤིས་གྲོང་རྡལ།	gla bo gshis grong rdal	623022106
Asigtang Town (Azitang)	阿子滩镇	Āzǐtān Zhèn	ཨ་གཟིགས་ཐང་གྲོང་རྡལ།	a gzigs thang grong rdal	623022107
Xincang Town (Shencang, Shenzang)	申藏镇	Shēncáng Zhèn	གཤིན་ཚང་གྲོང་རྡལ།	gshin tshang grong rdal	623022108
Wamar Town (Wanmao)	完冒镇	Wánmào Zhèn	ཝ་དམར་གྲོང་རྡལ།	wa dmar grong rdal	623022109
Nyinba Town (Niba)	尼巴镇	Níbā Zhèn	ཉིན་པ་གྲོང་རྡལ།	nyin pa grong rdal	623022110
Townships
Dokog Township (Daogao)	刀告乡	Dāogào Xiāng	མདོ་ཁོག་ཤང་།	mdo khog shang	623022202
Kyagê Township (Qiagai)	恰盖乡	Qiàgài Xiāng	ཁྱ་དགེ་ཤང་།	khya dge shang	623022207
Kangtog Township (Kangduo)	康多乡	Kāngduō Xiāng	ཁང་ཐོག་ཤང་།	khang thog shang	623022208
Ethnic township
Xowa Tu Ethnic Township (Shaowa)	杓哇土族乡	Biāowā Tǔzú Xiāng	ཤོ་བ་ཧོར་རིགས་ཤང་།	sho ba hor-rigs shang	623022209

== Climate ==
Climate data for Jonê, elevation 2,592 m (8,504 ft), (1991–2020 normals, extremes 1981–2010)
Month	Jan	Feb	Mar	Apr	May	Jun	Jul	Aug	Sep	Oct	Nov	Dec	Year
Record high °C (°F)	19.1 (66.4)	22.2 (72.0)	26.5 (79.7)	32.1 (89.8)	29.2 (84.6)	29.7 (85.5)	33.5 (92.3)	31.0 (87.8)	29.0 (84.2)	23.6 (74.5)	20.1 (68.2)	16.5 (61.7)	33.5 (92.3)
Mean daily maximum °C (°F)	3.7 (38.7)	6.3 (43.3)	10.4 (50.7)	15.0 (59.0)	17.9 (64.2)	20.7 (69.3)	22.8 (73.0)	22.5 (72.5)	18.4 (65.1)	13.6 (56.5)	9.7 (49.5)	5.4 (41.7)	13.9 (57.0)
Daily mean °C (°F)	−6.1 (21.0)	−2.5 (27.5)	2.0 (35.6)	6.8 (44.2)	10.4 (50.7)	13.6 (56.5)	15.9 (60.6)	15.3 (59.5)	11.7 (53.1)	6.4 (43.5)	0.5 (32.9)	−4.7 (23.5)	5.8 (42.4)
Mean daily minimum °C (°F)	−13.0 (8.6)	−9.0 (15.8)	−4.0 (24.8)	0.5 (32.9)	4.5 (40.1)	8.0 (46.4)	10.6 (51.1)	10.2 (50.4)	7.3 (45.1)	1.9 (35.4)	−5.3 (22.5)	−11.5 (11.3)	0.0 (32.0)
Record low °C (°F)	−23.3 (−9.9)	−20.4 (−4.7)	−18.3 (−0.9)	−8.6 (16.5)	−6.1 (21.0)	0.7 (33.3)	2.2 (36.0)	1.6 (34.9)	−3.7 (25.3)	−8.8 (16.2)	−16.2 (2.8)	−21.8 (−7.2)	−23.3 (−9.9)
Average precipitation mm (inches)	4.9 (0.19)	6.1 (0.24)	17.7 (0.70)	40.1 (1.58)	82.1 (3.23)	77.0 (3.03)	101.8 (4.01)	86.2 (3.39)	73.3 (2.89)	46.7 (1.84)	7.0 (0.28)	2.1 (0.08)	545 (21.46)
Average precipitation days (≥ 0.1 mm)	5.9	7.0	10.3	11.8	16.1	16.5	15.6	14.7	15.3	13.4	5.0	3.3	134.9
Average snowy days	10.3	10.8	13.1	7.6	1.8	0.1	0	0	0.2	4.6	7.5	6.6	62.6
Average relative humidity (%)	53	54	58	60	64	69	72	73	75	72	62	54	64
Mean monthly sunshine hours	200.7	183.8	202.7	210.9	213.6	199.9	216.9	208.0	158.7	167.5	192.6	205.9	2,361.2
Percentage possible sunshine	64	59	54	53	49	46	50	51	43	49	63	68	54
Source: China Meteorological Administration

== See also ==
- List of administrative divisions of Gansu
