= Gannan Tibetan Autonomous Prefecture =

Gannan Prefecture 甘南州 · ཀན་ལྷོ་ཁུལ།
- Autonomous prefecture
- Gannan Tibetan Autonomous Prefecture 甘南藏族自治州 · ཀན་ལྷོ་བོད་རིགས་རང་སྐྱོང་ཁུལ།
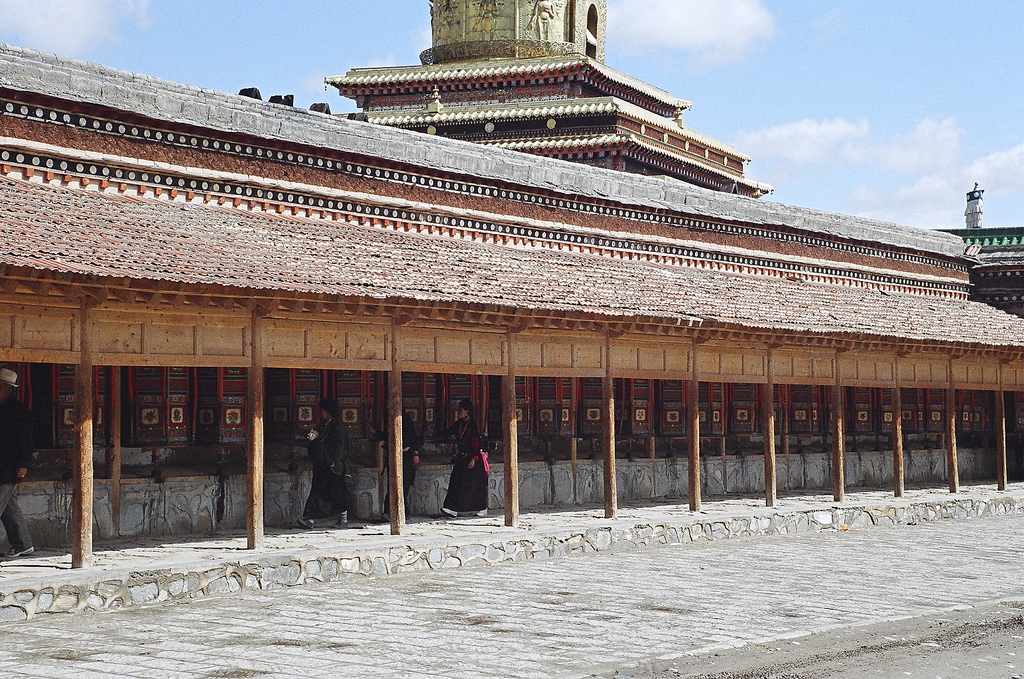
- Labrang Monastery, Xiahe County, Gannan Tibetan Autonomous Prefecture

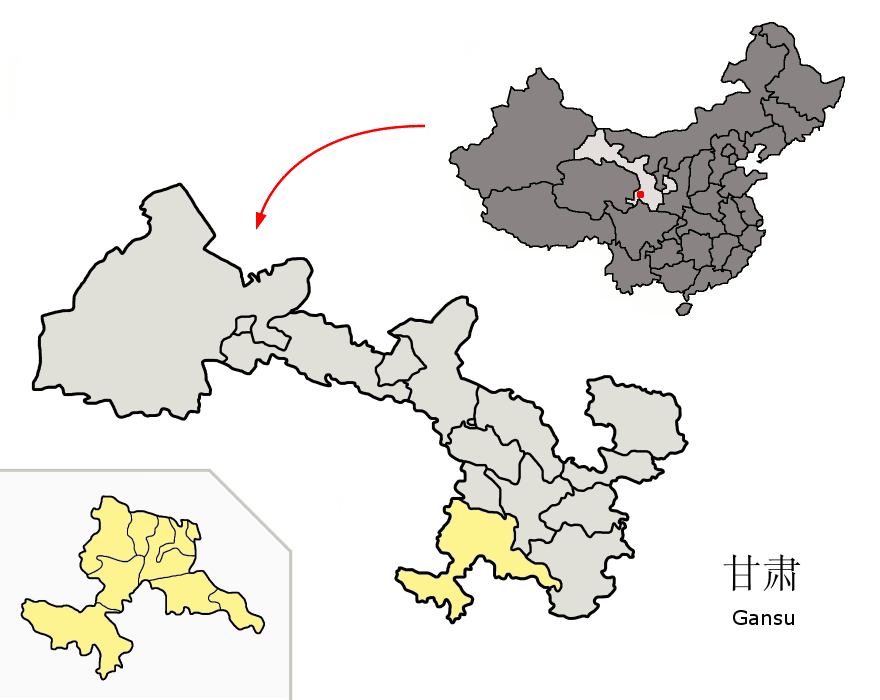
- Location of Gannan Tibetan Autonomous Prefecture within Gansu
- Coordinates: 34.98°N 102.91°E
- Country: China
- Province: Gansu
- Prefecture Seat: Hezuo

Government
  - Type: Autonomous prefecture
  - CCP Secretary: Yu Chenghui
  - Congress Chairman: Tashi Cao
  - Governor: Zhao Lingyun
  - CPPCC Chairman: Rinchen Thondup

Area
  - Total: 40,898 km^{2} (15,791 sq mi)

Population (2010)
  - Total: 689,132
  - Density: 16.850/km^{2} (43.641/sq mi)
  - Major Ethnic Groups: Tibetan−51.44% Han−41.75% Hui−6.43%

GDP
  - Total: CN¥ 12.7 billion US$ 2.0 billion
  - Per capita: CN¥ 17,990; US$ 2,888
- Time zone: UTC+8 (China Standard)
- ISO 3166 code: CN-GS-30
- Website: www.gn.gansu.gov.cn

Gannan Tibetan Autonomous Prefecture

Chinese name
- Traditional Chinese: 甘南藏族自治州
- Simplified Chinese: 甘南藏族自治州
Transcriptions
Standard Mandarin
- Hanyu Pinyin: Gānnán Zàngzú Zìzhìzhōu
other Mandarin
- Xiao'erjing: قًانًا زَانْ‌زُو زِجِ‌جِوْ

Tibetan name
- Tibetan: ཀན་ལྷོ་བོད་རིགས་རང་སྐྱོང་ཁུལ།
Transcriptions
- Wylie: kan lho bod rigs rang skyong khul
- Tibetan Pinyin: Gainlho Poirig Ranggyong Kü

Gannan Tibetan Autonomous Prefecture (Chinese: 甘南藏族自治州; pinyin: Gānnán Zàngzú Zìzhìzhōu; Tibetan: ཀན་ལྷོ་བོད་རིགས་རང་སྐྱོང་ཁུལ་, Wylie: Kan-lho Bod-rigs rang-skyong-khul, ZWPY: Gainlho Poirig Ranggyong Kü) is an autonomous prefecture in southern Gansu Province, China, bordering Linxia to the north, Dingxi to the northeast, Longnan to the east and Aba (Sichuan province) to the south. It includes Xiahe and the Labrang Monastery, Luqu, Maqu and other mostly Tibetan towns and villages. Gannan has an area of 40,898 km^{2} (15,791 sq mi) and its capital is Hezuo city (Zoi). In the first year of the proclamation of Gannan Autonomous District, the district-seat was at the Labrang Town of Sangqu.

== Population ==
According to the 2010 census, Gannan has 689,132 inhabitants (population density: 17.14 inhabitants per km^{2}).

=== Ethnic groups in Gannan, 2000 census ===
| Nationality | Population | Percentage |
|---|---|---|
| Tibetan | 329,278 | 51.44% |
| Han | 267,260 | 41.75% |
| Hui | 41,163 | 6.43% |
| Tu | 939 | 0.15% |
| Dongxiang | 258 | 0.04% |
| Manchu | 257 | 0.04% |
| Salar | 222 | 0.03% |
| Mongols | 215 | 0.03% |
| Others | 514 | 0.09% |

== Transport ==
Highway G213 runs through this prefecture. In 2013, the Gannan Xiahe Airport was opened.

== Subdivisions ==
1 county level city, 7 counties.

Map
Note: Lianhuashan National Nature Reserve is part of Lintan County.
| Name | Hanzi | Hanyu Pinyin | Tibetan | Wylie Tibetan Pinyin | Population (2010 Census) | Area (km^{2}) | Density (/km^{2}) |
| Hezuo City (Zoi City) | 合作市 | Hézuò Shì | གཙོས་གྲོང་ཁྱེར། | gtsos grong khyer Zoi Chongkyir | 90,290 | 2,670 | 33.81 |
| Lintan County | 临潭县 | Líntán Xiàn | ལིན་ཐན་རྫོང་། | lin than rdzong Lintain Zong | 137,001 | 1,557 | 87.99 |
| Jonê County (Zhuoni County) | 卓尼县 | Zhuóní Xiàn | ཅོ་ནེ་རྫོང་། | co ne rdzong Jonê Zong | 100,522 | 5,694 | 17.65 |
| Zhouqu County (Zhugqu County) | 舟曲县 | Zhōuqū Xiàn | འབྲུག་ཆུ་རྫོང་། | 'brug chu rdzong Zhugqu Zong | 132,108 | 3,010 | 43.88 |
| Têwo County (Diebu County) | 迭部县 | Diébù Xiàn | ཐེ་བོ་རྫོང་། | the bo rdzong Têwo Zong | 52,166 | 5,108 | 10.21 |
| Maqu County | 玛曲县 | Mǎqū Xiàn | རྨ་ཆུ་རྫོང་། | rma chu rdzong Maqu Zong | 54,745 | 10,190 | 6.72 |
| Luqu County | 碌曲县 | Lùqū Xiàn | ཀླུ་ཆུ་རྫོང་། | klu chu rdzong Gluqu Zong | 35,630 | 5,298 | 6.72 |
| Xiahe County (Sangqu County) | 夏河县 | Xiàhé Xiàn | བསང་ཆུ་རྫོང་། | bsang chu rdzong Sangqu Zong | 86,670 | 6,674 | 12.98 |

== Climate ==
Gannan, as illustrated by this chart for Xiahe, has an alpine subarctic climate (Köppen Dwc) that grades into an alpine climate (ETH) at the highest elevations. The climate is characterised by mild, rainy summers and frigid, but dry and sunny, winters.

Climate data for Xiahe County
| Month | Jan | Feb | Mar | Apr | May | Jun | Jul | Aug | Sep | Oct | Nov | Dec | Year |
|---|---|---|---|---|---|---|---|---|---|---|---|---|---|
| Mean daily maximum °C (°F) | 5 (41) | 7 (45) | 10 (50) | 13 (55) | 17 (63) | 21 (70) | 19 (66) | 17 (63) | 15 (59) | 9 (48) | 8 (46) | 5 (41) | 12 (54) |
| Mean daily minimum °C (°F) | −18 (0) | −16 (3) | −12 (10) | −8 (18) | −6 (21) | −2 (28) | 3 (37) | 1 (34) | −3 (27) | −7 (19) | −12 (10) | −16 (3) | −8 (18) |
| Average precipitation mm (inches) | 6 (0.2) | 15 (0.6) | 14 (0.6) | 62 (2.4) | 101 (4.0) | 105 (4.1) | 174 (6.9) | 120 (4.7) | 139 (5.5) | 44 (1.7) | 9 (0.4) | 3 (0.1) | 792 (31.2) |

== See also ==
- Zorgey Ritoma
