= Gaolou =

Gaolou (高楼) may refer to the following locations in China:

- Gaolou, Lingbi County, town in Lingbi County, Anhui
- Gaolou, Sanhe, town in Hebei
- Gaolou, Rui'an, town in Rui'an, Zhejiang
- Gaolou Township, Qingcheng County, in Qingcheng County, Gansu
- Gaolou Township, Tianshui, in Wushan County, Gansu
- Gaolou Township, Weishan County, Shandong, in Weishan County, Shandong
