= Yima =

Yima may refer to:

- Jamshid, figure in Iranian mythology
- Yima, Henan (义马市), city under administration of Sanmenxia, China
- Yima, Gansu (驿马镇), town in Qingcheng County, Gansu, China
- Yima, Jilin (驿马镇), town in Panshi, Jilin, China
