= Luotuo =

Archaeological site from the Han to Tang dynasties in Gansu, China

Luotuo City Site
- Type: National priority protected site (November 20, 1996): Ancient city ruins.
- Location: Gaotai County, Gansu, China

History
- Built: Han–Tang

Site notes
- Management: State Council of China

Luotuo City is located in the middle of the Hexi Corridor, 20 kilometers southwest of the seat of Gaotai County, Gansu Province, at Xitan Village in Luotuo Village. It is a typical frontier commandery city from the Han and Tang periods. The Chongxiu Suzhou Xinzhi, compiled between the 13th year of the Yongzheng reign and the 2nd year of the Qianlong reign (1735–1737) of the Qing dynasty, records: "Luotuo City is located 40 li southwest of the city" and "This is the former city of Jiankang; Luotuo City is its common name."

Luotuo City was first built during the Yuan Ding period of Emperor Wu of Han (116–111 BCE) and belonged to Biaoshi County (changed to Biaishi County in the Eastern Han) in Jiuquan Commandery. In 180 CE, a major earthquake struck Biaishi County. A new county seat and city were built at a new location, which is the current Luotuo City site. It continued in use during the Wei and Jin periods. In the 23rd year of the Jianxing reign of the Former Liang (335 CE), Biaishi County was upgraded to Jiankang Commandery. In 397, the Northern Liang regime was established and made Jiankang Commandery its capital. Many Sogdian people who migrated from the Western Regions settled in Jiankang Commandery in Hexi and were active in the Luotuo City area. After Juqu Mengxun moved to Guzang, he still maintained Jiankang Commandery. During the Northern Zhou, the commandery was abolished and merged into Zhangye Commandery. In the 1st year of the Zhengsheng reign of Wu Zhou (695), the Jiankang Army was established under the command of Ganzhou garrison (Zhangye). In the 1st year of the Da Li reign of Emperor Daizong of Tang (766), it fell to the Tibetans, the city was abandoned, and there are almost no further records of Luotuo City in historical texts afterward. Therefore, Luotuo City spans five hundred years from the Han to the Tang. Its remains are useful for the observation of the social and living conditions of various ethnic groups.

In July 1994, the Public Security Bureau of Gaotai County, Gansu Province, cracked a case of tomb robbing involving portrait bricks from Luotuo City. Personnel were dispatched in cooperation with the Gaotai County Museum to investigate the unearthed portrait bricks and the site. The stolen portrait bricks have been collected by the Gaotai County Museum. On November 20, 1996, it was announced as one of the Fourth Batch of Major National Historical and Cultural Sites Protected at the National Level. In 1998, due to the construction of a flood control dam southeast of Luotuo City, early robbed ancient tombs were cleared in advance. In June and July 2001, the Gansu Provincial Institute of Cultural Relics and Archaeology conducted excavation and clearance at the Luotuo City site and burial area in Gaotai County. The excavated area was 1,200 square meters. There are four major tomb groups: the Tumulus Tomb Group, the Luotuo City South Tomb Group, the Five Kiln Tomb Group, and the Huangjiapidai Tomb Group, totaling more than 3,000 tombs. In June 2003, to support the construction of the Luotuo City flood control dam, seven tombs south of Luotuo City were urgently excavated.

A large-scale ancient tomb group surrounding the ancient city has yielded artifacts such as silk, painted bricks, and dated bamboo and wooden slips. In particular, the tomb paintings have strong regional characteristics and reflect Wei-Jin history. The tomb mural bricks of Luotuo City recreate scenes of social life in the Hexi Corridor during the Wei and Jin periods, covering topics such as oasis tuntian farming, frontier herding and hunting, transportation and travel, singing and dancing at banquets, and ancient myths. Wooden panel paintings, colored wooden artifacts, and painted mural bricks fully display all aspects of socioeconomic and cultural development at the time. The contents depicted—agriculture, animal husbandry, sericulture, hunting, military affairs, tuntian reclamation, wubao fortifications, and carriages—provide materials for studying the production and daily life of various ethnic groups in the Hexi Corridor during the Wei and Jin periods.

== Tombs ==
Initially, attention to Luotuo City was drawn from the rich collection of portrait bricks from its tombs. In the 1994 investigation by the Zhangye Regional Cultural Relics Management Office and the Gaotai County Museum, the locations, forms, and detailed information on the portrait bricks of the robbed tombs were recorded. The contents of the portrait bricks include agriculture, herding, and chariots and horses of daily life at the time, as well as myths such as Fuxi and Nüwa, and the Duke of the East and Queen Mother of the West, along with imaginations of the afterlife. By comparing the clothing, painting style, and techniques of the figures with similar tombs in Hexi, the survey team inferred that the Luotuo City portrait bricks date to the Wei-Jin period. However, this discovery was not a formal archaeological excavation but only a recording of the artifacts.

In 2001, the Gansu Provincial Institute of Cultural Relics and Archaeology and the Gaotai County Museum conducted archaeological excavations at Luotuo City. Four tombs south of the city were excavated, with records including tomb structure, burial goods, portrait bricks, and their contents. In addition to abundant wooden figurines, wooden horses, and pottery, the burial goods also included wooden slips with written text. By comparing the unearthed artifacts and portrait brick contents with other Wei-Jin tombs in Dunhuang, the archaeological team dated the tombs to the Wei-Jin period, or roughly the 3rd, 4th and 5th centuries during the Six Dynasties period.

In June 2003, in cooperation with the construction of the Luotuo City flood control dam, the Dunhuang Research Academy Institute of Archaeology and the Gaotai County Museum jointly conducted rescue excavations of seven tombs south of Luotuo City. Detailed records were made of tomb structures, murals, burial goods, and accompanying artifacts. All seven excavated tombs had been robbed, but many burial objects remained, mostly pottery, along with lacquerware, wooden artifacts, bronze items, jade, and coins. Based on tomb structure, types of unearthed pottery, and relative positions, the archaeological team divided the seven tombs into two groups primarily differentiated by date. The first group dates to the mid-to-late Eastern Han, and the second group contained unearthed coins, leading to the inference that they belonged to the late Eastern Han.

== Luotuo City Documents ==
Tomb contracts, also known as land purchase contracts or netherworld deeds, are mostly made of stone, silk, or wooden boards. The contracts are not directed at the living but are agreements with deities in the realm of the dead, hoping to preserve the tomb owner's personal property and living space in the afterlife. Among the artifacts unearthed at Luotuo City are such tomb contracts. Their contents not only include contractual terms but also record many deities related to death in the society of the time.

Liu Lexian studied the tomb contracts of the young couple Geng Shaoping and Sun Azhao. Based on the five elements which recorded a "Geng surname, male auspicious, named Shaoping, age 20, fate in metal; Sun surname, female auspicious, courtesy name Azhao, age 15, fate in earth" and the later statement "from now on they match and unite... at the time of harmonious union," he inferred that the two had a marital relationship. However, it later states "chariots meet before the tomb" and "together they shall serve for a thousand autumns and ten thousand years, without harming family members... life and death are different paths, each has its own city walls; the living go forward, the dead retreat." Therefore, he proposed that the tomb contract was actually a "netherworld marriage document." Drawing on the Zuomeng Lu of the Song dynasty, Dunhuang manuscripts, and Daoist historical materials regarding "male auspicious ghosts" and "female auspicious ghosts," Liu Lexian deduced the writing style of netherworld marriage contracts and how the related netherworld marriage culture expresses the relationship and imagination between death and life. The tomb contracts of Luotuo City, which developed from the Qin-Han through the Tang-Song, reflect the traditional Chinese view of life and death that "the dead do not perish." The dead maintain a certain connection with the living. Through netherworld marriage rituals, it is believed that order in the afterlife is maintained, and that the dead will not disturb the lives of the living in the present world.

On the other hand, Zhao Xueye and Zhao Wanjun analyzed the imagination and beliefs regarding life and death in medieval China through this tomb contract. The contract mentions "Qiu Cheng Mu Bo," which also appears on vermilion-inscribed pottery jars from Luoyang and can be said to be among the earliest tomb deities in China. There is also "Taiyi" (also written "Tayi"), a legendary heavenly deity later incorporated into the Daoist pantheon. In addition, the ancient destinations of the dead, "Haoli" and "Si Feng," appear, which can basically be understood as living spaces in the "afterlife world." This space for the dead actually corresponds to the spatial concepts of people at the time. The "house divination diagram" unearthed together shows spatial concepts between yin and yang and also contains the five elements and feng shui.

Accompanying the burial of the tomb owner were not only contractual documents but also proofs of property, known as "clothing inventories" on wooden slips. The first discovered in the Luotuo City South tomb group came from a Former Liang tomb, a joint burial of a husband and wife. The male owner was named Zhao Shuang; the female owner was called Zhao Azi. Both left clothing inventories belonging to themselves. Therefore, even though the tomb had been robbed and only fragmented materials remained, through this clothing inventory the specifications and types of clothing can still be observed. Kou Kehong, director of the Gaotai County Museum, conducted in-depth research, classifying and discussing the nature and significance of the clothing. From writing tools such as a "black knife brush pouch" and a brush among Zhao Shuang's burial goods, he inferred that the tomb owner's social status during the Northern and Southern Dynasties would have been that of a civil official. From the materials of the clothing, it can be observed that the Luotuo City area was already capable of producing silk and engaging in foreign trade. These daily-use items are rarely seen in transmitted literature, so scholars have worked hard to explore clearer details of the clothing from excavated artifacts. Tian He and Qin Fenghe discussed the term "jie fa" recorded in the tomb contract. Some scholars believe "jie fa" refers to the tassels for binding the cap. However, by comparing headwear styles in contemporary Tibetan documents and cross-checking descriptions in transmitted literature, Tian He and Qin Fenghe believe that "jie fa" is a type of headscarf for binding the hair.
