= List of administrative divisions of Gansu =

Gansu Province
- Province
- Capital: Lanzhou

Prefecture-level divisions
- Prefectural cities: 12
- Autonomous prefectures: 2

County level divisions
- County cities: 5
- Counties: 57
- Autonomous counties: 7
- Districts: 17

Township level divisions
- Towns: 457
- Townships: 740
- Ethnic townships: 30
- Subdistricts: 121

Villages level divisions
- Communities: 1,338
- Administrative villages: 16,038
- Jiayuguan districts are not counted into the figures above.

Gansu, a province of the People's Republic of China, is made up of the following administrative divisions.

== Administrative divisions ==
These administrative divisions are explained in greater detail at Administrative divisions of the People's Republic of China. The following table lists only the prefecture-level and county-level divisions of Gansu.

Prefecture level (Division code)	County Level				
Prefecture level (Division code)	Name	Chinese	Hanyu Pinyin	Division code	
Lanzhou city 兰州市; Lánzhōu Shì (Capital) (6201 / LHW)	Chengguan District	城关区	Chéngguān Qū	620102	CLZ
Lanzhou city 兰州市; Lánzhōu Shì (Capital) (6201 / LHW)	Qilihe District	七里河区	Qīlǐhé Qū	620103	QLH
Lanzhou city 兰州市; Lánzhōu Shì (Capital) (6201 / LHW)	Xigu District	西固区	Xīgù Qū	620104	XGU
Lanzhou city 兰州市; Lánzhōu Shì (Capital) (6201 / LHW)	Anning District	安宁区	Ānníng Qū	620105	ANQ
Lanzhou city 兰州市; Lánzhōu Shì (Capital) (6201 / LHW)	Honggu District	红古区	Hónggǔ Qū	620111	HOG
Lanzhou city 兰州市; Lánzhōu Shì (Capital) (6201 / LHW)	Yongdeng County	永登县	Yǒngdēng Xiàn	620121	YDG
Lanzhou city 兰州市; Lánzhōu Shì (Capital) (6201 / LHW)	Gaolan County	皋兰县	Gāolán Xiàn	620122	GAL
Lanzhou city 兰州市; Lánzhōu Shì (Capital) (6201 / LHW)	Yuzhong County	榆中县	Yúzhōng Xiàn	620123	YZX
Jiayuguan city 嘉峪关市; Jiāyùguān Shì (6202 / JYG)	Xiongguan District (Note: These districts within Jiayuguan are not formal administrative subdivisions recognized by the Ministry of Civil Affairs.)	雄关区	Xióngguān Qū	620201	JYG
Jiayuguan city 嘉峪关市; Jiāyùguān Shì (6202 / JYG)	Changcheng District	长城区	Chángchéng Qū	620201	JYG
Jiayuguan city 嘉峪关市; Jiāyùguān Shì (6202 / JYG)	Jingtie District	镜铁区	Jìngtiě Qū	620201	JYG
Jinchang city 金昌市; Jīnchāng Shì (6203 / JCS)	Jinchuan District	金川区	Jīnchuān Qū	620302	JCU
Jinchang city 金昌市; Jīnchāng Shì (6203 / JCS)	Yongchang County	永昌县	Yǒngchāng Xiàn	620321	YCF
Baiyin city 白银市; Báiyín Shì (6204 / BYS)	Baiyin District	白银区	Báiyín Qū	620402	BYB
Baiyin city 白银市; Báiyín Shì (6204 / BYS)	Pingchuan District	平川区	Píngchuān Qū	620403	PCQ
Baiyin city 白银市; Báiyín Shì (6204 / BYS)	Jingyuan County	靖远县	Jìngyuǎn Xiàn	620421	JYH
Baiyin city 白银市; Báiyín Shì (6204 / BYS)	Huining County	会宁县	Huìníng Xiàn	620422	HNI
Baiyin city 白银市; Báiyín Shì (6204 / BYS)	Jingtai County	景泰县	Jǐngtài Xiàn	620423	JGT
Tianshui city 天水市; Tiānshuǐ Shì (6205 / TSU)	Qinzhou District	秦州区	Qínzhōu Qū	620502	QZQ
Tianshui city 天水市; Tiānshuǐ Shì (6205 / TSU)	Maiji District	麦积区	Màijī Qū	620503	MJI
Tianshui city 天水市; Tiānshuǐ Shì (6205 / TSU)	Qingshui County	清水县	Qīngshuǐ Xiàn	620521	QSG
Tianshui city 天水市; Tiānshuǐ Shì (6205 / TSU)	Qin'an County	秦安县	Qín'ān Xiàn	620522	QNA
Tianshui city 天水市; Tiānshuǐ Shì (6205 / TSU)	Gangu County	甘谷县	Gāngǔ Xiàn	620523	GGU
Tianshui city 天水市; Tiānshuǐ Shì (6205 / TSU)	Wushan County	武山县	Wǔshān Xiàn	620524	WSX
Tianshui city 天水市; Tiānshuǐ Shì (6205 / TSU)	Zhangjiachuan County (Note: Conventional name: Zhangjiachuan Hui Autonomous County; Chinese: 张家川回族自治县; pinyin: Zhāngjiāchuān Huízú Zìzhìxiàn)	张家川县	Zhāngjiāchuān Xiàn	620525	ZJC
Wuwei city 武威市; Wǔwēi Shì (6206 / WWS)	Liangzhou District	凉州区	Liángzhōu Qū	620602	LQZ
Wuwei city 武威市; Wǔwēi Shì (6206 / WWS)	Minqin County	民勤县	Mínqín Xiàn	620621	MQN
Wuwei city 武威市; Wǔwēi Shì (6206 / WWS)	Gulang County	古浪县	Gǔlàng Xiàn	620622	GLG
Wuwei city 武威市; Wǔwēi Shì (6206 / WWS)	Tianzhu County (Note: Conventional name: Tianzhu Tibetan Autonomous County; Chinese: 天祝藏族自治县; pinyin: Tiānzhù Zàngzú Zìzhìxiàn)	天祝县	Tiānzhù Xiàn	620623	TZG
Zhangye city 张掖市; Zhāngyè Shì (6207 / ZYE)	Ganzhou District	甘州区	Gānzhōu Qū	620702	GOU
Zhangye city 张掖市; Zhāngyè Shì (6207 / ZYE)	Sunan County (Note: Conventional name: Sunan Yugur Autonomous County; Chinese: 肃南裕固族自治县; pinyin: Sùnán Yùgùzú Zìzhìxiàn)	肃南县	Sùnán Xiàn	620721	SUN
Zhangye city 张掖市; Zhāngyè Shì (6207 / ZYE)	Minle County	民乐县	Mínlè Xiàn	620722	MLE
Zhangye city 张掖市; Zhāngyè Shì (6207 / ZYE)	Linze County	临泽县	Línzé Xiàn	620723	LZE
Zhangye city 张掖市; Zhāngyè Shì (6207 / ZYE)	Gaotai County	高台县	Gāotái Xiàn	620724	GAT
Zhangye city 张掖市; Zhāngyè Shì (6207 / ZYE)	Shandan County	山丹县	Shāndān Xiàn	620725	SDN
Pingliang city 平凉市; Píngliáng Shì (6208 / PLS)	Kongtong District	崆峒区	Kōngtóng Qū	620802	KTQ
Pingliang city 平凉市; Píngliáng Shì (6208 / PLS)	Jingchuan County	泾川县	Jīngchuān Xiàn	620821	JCN
Pingliang city 平凉市; Píngliáng Shì (6208 / PLS)	Lingtai County	灵台县	Língtái Xiàn	620822	LGT
Pingliang city 平凉市; Píngliáng Shì (6208 / PLS)	Chongxin County	崇信县	Chóngxìn Xiàn	620823	COX
Pingliang city 平凉市; Píngliáng Shì (6208 / PLS)	Zhuanglang County	庄浪县	Zhuānglàng Xiàn	620825	ZLG
Pingliang city 平凉市; Píngliáng Shì (6208 / PLS)	Jingning County	静宁县	Jìngníng Xiàn	620826	JNI
Pingliang city 平凉市; Píngliáng Shì (6208 / PLS)	Huating city	华亭市	Huátíng Shì	620881	
Jiuquan city 酒泉市; Jiǔquán Shì (6209 / JQG)	Suzhou District	肃州区	Sùzhōu Qū	620902	SOU
Jiuquan city 酒泉市; Jiǔquán Shì (6209 / JQG)	Jinta County	金塔县	Jīntǎ Xiàn	620921	JTA
Jiuquan city 酒泉市; Jiǔquán Shì (6209 / JQG)	Guazhou County	瓜州县	Guāzhōu Xiàn	620922	GUZ
Jiuquan city 酒泉市; Jiǔquán Shì (6209 / JQG)	Subei County (Note: Conventional name: Subei Mongol Autonomous County; Chinese: 肃北蒙古族自治县; pinyin: Sùběi Měnggǔzú Zìzhìxiàn)	肃北县	Sùběi Xiàn	620923	SBE
Jiuquan city 酒泉市; Jiǔquán Shì (6209 / JQG)	Akesai County (Note: Conventional name: Aksai Kazakh Autonomous County; Chinese: 阿克塞哈萨克族自治县; pinyin: Ākèsài Hāsàkèzú Zìzhìxiàn)	阿克塞县	Ākèsài Xiàn	620924	AKX
Jiuquan city 酒泉市; Jiǔquán Shì (6209 / JQG)	Yumen city	玉门市	Yùmén Shì	620981	YMS
Jiuquan city 酒泉市; Jiǔquán Shì (6209 / JQG)	Dunhuang city	敦煌市	Dūnhuáng Shì	620982	DNH
Qingyang city 庆阳市; Qìngyáng Shì (6210 / QYI)	Xifeng District	西峰区	Xīfēng Qū	621002	XFE
Qingyang city 庆阳市; Qìngyáng Shì (6210 / QYI)	Qingcheng County	庆城县	Qìngchéng Xiàn	621021	QIC
Qingyang city 庆阳市; Qìngyáng Shì (6210 / QYI)	Huanxian County (Note: Official name registered by the Ministry of Civil Affairs.)	环县	Huánxiàn	621022	HUN
Qingyang city 庆阳市; Qìngyáng Shì (6210 / QYI)	Huachi County	华池县	Huáchí Xiàn	621023	HCI
Qingyang city 庆阳市; Qìngyáng Shì (6210 / QYI)	Heshui County	合水县	Héshuǐ Xiàn	621024	HSX
Qingyang city 庆阳市; Qìngyáng Shì (6210 / QYI)	Zhengning County	正宁县	Zhèngníng Xiàn	621025	ZGN
Qingyang city 庆阳市; Qìngyáng Shì (6210 / QYI)	Ningxian County	宁县	Níngxiàn	621026	NIG
Qingyang city 庆阳市; Qìngyáng Shì (6210 / QYI)	Zhenyuan County	镇原县	Zhènyuán Xiàn	621027	ZYN
Dingxi city 定西市; Dìngxī Shì (6211 / DNX)	Anding District	安定区	Āndìng Qū	621102	ADQ
Dingxi city 定西市; Dìngxī Shì (6211 / DNX)	Tongwei County	通渭县	Tōngwèi Xiàn	621121	TWE
Dingxi city 定西市; Dìngxī Shì (6211 / DNX)	Longxi County	陇西县	Lǒngxī Xiàn	621122	LXK
Dingxi city 定西市; Dìngxī Shì (6211 / DNX)	Weiyuan County	渭源县	Wèiyuán Xiàn	621123	WIY
Dingxi city 定西市; Dìngxī Shì (6211 / DNX)	Lintao County	临洮县	Líntáo Xiàn	621124	LTO
Dingxi city 定西市; Dìngxī Shì (6211 / DNX)	Zhangxian County	漳县	Zhāngxiàn	621125	ZGX
Dingxi city 定西市; Dìngxī Shì (6211 / DNX)	Minxian County	岷县	Mínxiàn	621126	MIN
Longnan city 陇南市; Lǒngnán Shì (6212 / LGN)	Wudu District	武都区	Wǔdū Qū	621202	WUD
Longnan city 陇南市; Lǒngnán Shì (6212 / LGN)	Chengxian County	成县	Chéngxiàn	621221	CHG
Longnan city 陇南市; Lǒngnán Shì (6212 / LGN)	Wenxian County	文县	Wénxiàn	621222	WEG
Longnan city 陇南市; Lǒngnán Shì (6212 / LGN)	Tanchang County	宕昌县	Tànchāng Xiàn	621223	TCH
Longnan city 陇南市; Lǒngnán Shì (6212 / LGN)	Kangxian County	康县	Kāngxiàn	621224	KNG
Longnan city 陇南市; Lǒngnán Shì (6212 / LGN)	Xihe County	西和县	Xīhé Xiàn	621225	XHE
Longnan city 陇南市; Lǒngnán Shì (6212 / LGN)	Lixian County	礼县	Lǐxiàn	621226	LXG
Longnan city 陇南市; Lǒngnán Shì (6212 / LGN)	Huixian County	徽县	Huīxiàn	621227	HIX
Longnan city 陇南市; Lǒngnán Shì (6212 / LGN)	Liangdang County	两当县	Liǎngdāng Xiàn	621228	LDG
Linxia Prefecture (Note: Conventional name: Linxia Hui Autonomous Prefecture; Chinese: 临夏回族自治州; pinyin: Línxià Huizù Zìzhìzhōu) 临夏州; Línxià Zhōu (6229 / LXH)	Linxia city	临夏市	Línxià Shì	622901	LXR
Linxia Prefecture 临夏州; Línxià Zhōu (6229 / LXH)	Linxia County	临夏县	Línxià Xiàn	622921	LXF
Linxia Prefecture 临夏州; Línxià Zhōu (6229 / LXH)	Kangle County	康乐县	Kānglè Xiàn	622922	KLE
Linxia Prefecture 临夏州; Línxià Zhōu (6229 / LXH)	Yongjing County	永靖县	Yǒngjìng Xiàn	622923	YJG
Linxia Prefecture 临夏州; Línxià Zhōu (6229 / LXH)	Guanghe County	广河县	Guǎnghé Xiàn	622924	GHX
Linxia Prefecture 临夏州; Línxià Zhōu (6229 / LXH)	Hezheng County	和政县	Hézhèng Xiàn	622925	HZG
Linxia Prefecture 临夏州; Línxià Zhōu (6229 / LXH)	Dongxiang County (Note: Conventional name: Dongxiang Autonomous County; Chinese: 东乡族自治县; pinyin: Dōngxiāngzú Zìzhìxiàn)	东乡县	Dōngxiāng Xiàn	622926	DXZ
Linxia Prefecture 临夏州; Línxià Zhōu (6229 / LXH)	Jishishan County (Note: Conventional name: Jishishan Bonan, Dongxiang and Salar Autonomous County; Chinese: 积石山保安族东乡族撒拉族自治县; pinyin: Jīshíshān Bǎo'ānzú Dōngxiāngzú Sālāzú Zìzhìxiàn)	积石山县	Jīshíshān Xiàn	622927	JSN
Gannan Prefecture (Note: Conventional name: Gannan Tibetan Autonomous Prefecture; Chinese: 甘南藏族自治州; pinyin: Gānnán Zàngzú Zìzhìzhōu) 甘南州; Gānnán Zhōu (6230 / GNZ)	Hezuo city	合作市	Hézuò Shì	623001	HEZ
Gannan Prefecture 甘南州; Gānnán Zhōu (6230 / GNZ)	Lintan County	临潭县	Líntán Xiàn	623021	LTN
Gannan Prefecture 甘南州; Gānnán Zhōu (6230 / GNZ)	Zhuoni County	卓尼县	Zhuóní Xiàn	623022	JON
Gannan Prefecture 甘南州; Gānnán Zhōu (6230 / GNZ)	Zhongqu County	舟曲县	Zhōuqū Xiàn	623023	ZQU
Gannan Prefecture 甘南州; Gānnán Zhōu (6230 / GNZ)	Diebu County	迭部县	Diébù Xiàn	623024	TEW
Gannan Prefecture 甘南州; Gānnán Zhōu (6230 / GNZ)	Maqu County	玛曲县	Mǎqū Xiàn	623025	MQU
Gannan Prefecture 甘南州; Gānnán Zhōu (6230 / GNZ)	Luqu County	碌曲县	Lùqū Xiàn	623026	LQU
Gannan Prefecture 甘南州; Gānnán Zhōu (6230 / GNZ)	Xiahe County	夏河县	Xiàhé Xiàn	623027	XHN

== Recent changes in administrative divisions ==
Date	Before	After	Note	Reference
1980-06-14	parts of Linxia County	Jishishan County (Aut.)	established	
1981-02-09	parts of Yongchang County	Jinchang (PC-City)	established	
1981-09-01	parts of Wuwei Prefecture	Jinchang (P-City) city district	established	
1981-09-01	↳ Jinchang (PC-City)	Jinchang (P-City) city district	disestablished	
1981-09-01	↳ Yongchang County	↳ Yongchang County	transferred	
1983-01-18	all Province-controlled city (P-City) → Prefecture-level city (PL-City)			Civil Affairs Announcement
1983-01-18	all Prefecture-controlled city (PC-City) → County-level city (CL-City)			Civil Affairs Announcement
1983-07-29	Pingliang County	Pingliang (CL-City)	reorganized	
1983-09-31	parts of Linxia County	Linxia (CL-City)	established	
1984-12-14	Jinchang (PL-City) city district	Jinchuan District	established	
1985-05-14	Wuwei County	Wuwei (CL-City)	reorganized	
1985-05-14	Wudu Prefecture	Longnan Prefecture	renamed	
1985-05-14	parts of Tianshui Prefecture	Longnan Prefecture	transferred	
1985-05-14	↳ Xihe County	↳ Xihe County	transferred	
1985-05-14	↳ Li County	↳ Li County	transferred	
1985-05-14	parts of Tianshui Prefecture	Dingxi Prefecture	transferred	
1985-05-14	↳ Zhang County	↳ Zhang County	transferred	
1985-05-14	parts of Wudu Prefecture	Dingxi Prefecture	transferred	
1985-05-14	↳ Min County	↳ Min County	transferred	
1985-05-14	parts of Lanzhou (PL-City)	Baiyin (PL-City)	established	
1985-05-14	↳ Baiyin District	↳ Baiyin District	transferred	
1985-05-14	parts of Dingxi Prefecture	Baiyin (PL-City)	transferred	
1985-05-14	↳ Jingyuan County	↳ Jingyuan County	transferred	
1985-05-14	↳ parts of Jingyuan County	↳ Pingchuan District	established	
1985-05-14	↳ Huining County	↳ Huining County	transferred	
1985-05-14	parts of Wuwei Prefecture	Baiyin (PL-City)	transferred	
1985-05-14	↳ Jingtai County	↳ Jingtai County	transferred	
1985-05-14	Zhangye County	Zhangye (CL-City)	reorganized	
1985-05-14	Jiuquan County	Jiuquan (CL-City)	reorganized	
1985-05-14	parts of Qingyang County	Xifeng (CL-City)	established	
1985-07-08	Tianshui Prefecture	Tianshui (PL-City)	established	
1985-07-08	Tianshui (CL-City)	Qinzhou District	reorganized	
1985-07-08	Tianshui County	Qinzhou District	merged into	
1985-07-08	Tianshui County	Maiji District	reorganized	
1985-07-08	parts of Tianshui Prefecture	Longnan Prefecture	transferred	
1985-07-08	↳ Hui County	↳ Hui County	transferred	
1985-07-08	↳ Liangdang County	↳ Liangdang County	transferred	
1987-08-21	Dunhuang County	Dunhuang (CL-City)	reorganized	
1996-05-28	parts of Xiahe County	Hezuo (CL-City)	established	Civil Affairs [1996]35
2001-05-09	Wuwei Prefecture	Wuwei (PL-City)	reorganized	State Council [2001]47
2001-05-09	Wuwei (CL-City)	Liangzhou District	reorganized	State Council [2001]47
2002-03-01	Zhangye Prefecture	Zhangye (PL-City)	reorganized	State Council [2002]16
2002-03-01	Zhangye (CL-City)	Ganzhou District	reorganized	State Council [2002]16
2002-06-02	Pingliang Prefecture	Pingliang (PL-City)	reorganized	State Council [2002]46
2002-06-02	Pingliang (CL-City)	Kongtong District	reorganized	State Council [2002]46
2002-06-18	Jiuquan Prefecture	Jiuquan (PL-City)	reorganized	State Council [2002]53
2002-06-18	Jiuquan (CL-City)	Suzhou District	reorganized	State Council [2002]53
2002-06-22	Qingyang Prefecture	Qingyang (PL-City)	reorganized	State Council [2002]55
2002-06-22	Xifeng (CL-City)	Xifeng District	reorganized	State Council [2002]55
2003-04-04	Dingxi Prefecture	Dingxi (PL-City)	reorganized	State Council [2003]46
2003-04-04	Dingxi County	Anding District	reorganized	State Council [2003]46
2004-01-11	Longnan Prefecture	Longnan (PL-City)	reorganized	State Council [2004]5
2004-01-11	Wudu County	Wudu District	reorganized	State Council [2004]5
2004-09-30	Qincheng District	Qinzhou District	renamed	Civil Affairs [2004]244
2004-09-30	Beidao District	Maiji District	renamed	Civil Affairs [2004]244
2006-02-08	Anxi County	Guazhou County	renamed	Civil Affairs [2006]1
2018-07-02	Huating County	Huating (CL-City)	reorganized	Civil Affairs [2018]109

== Population composition ==
=== Prefectures ===
Prefecture	2010	2000
Jiuquan	1,095,947	
Jiayuguan	231,853	159,566
Zhangye	1,199,515	
Jinchang	464,050	451,927
Wuwei	1815054	
Baiyin	1,586,544	
Lanzhou	3,616,163	3,142,464
Linxia	1,946,677	
Gannan	689,132	640,106
Dingxi	2,698,622	
Longnan	2,567,718	
Tianshui	3,262,548	
Pingliang	2,068,033	
Qingyang	2,062,799	

=== Counties ===
Name	Prefecture	2010
Chengguan	Lanzhou	1,278,745
Qilihe	Lanzhou	561,020
Xigu	Lanzhou	364,050
Anning	Lanzhou	288,510
Honggu	Lanzhou	136,101
Yongdeng	Lanzhou	418,789
Gaolan	Lanzhou	131,785
Yuzhong	Lanzhou	437,163
Jinchuan	Jinchang	228,561
Yongchang	Jinchang	235,489
Baiyin	Baiyin	294,400
Pingchuan	Baiyin	192,398
Jingyuan	Baiyin	454,925
Huining	Baiyin	541,273
Jingtai	Baiyin	225,755
Qinzhou	Tianshui	643,906
Maiji	Tianshui	553,268
Qingshui	Tianshui	266,908
Qin'an	Tianshui	515,423
Gangu	Tianshui	559,712
Wushan	Tianshui	437,268
Zhangjiachuan	Tianshui	286,063
Liangzhou	Wuwei	1,010,295
Minqin	Wuwei	241,251
Gulang	Wuwei	388,718
Tianzhu	Wuwei	174,790
Ganzhou	Zhangye	507,433
Minle	Zhangye	219,356
Linze	Zhangye	134,328
Gaotai	Zhangye	143,446
Shandan	Zhangye	161,299
Sunan	Zhangye	33,653
Kongtong	Pingliang	504,848
Jingchuan	Pingliang	281,145
Lingtai	Pingliang	183,937
Chongxin	Pingliang	102,116
Huating	Pingliang	189,333
Zhuanglang	Pingliang	382,827
Jingning	Pingliang	423,827
Suzhou	Jiuquan	428,346
Jinta	Jiuquan	147,460
Guazhou	Jiuquan	148,798
Subei	Jiuquan	14,979
Akesai	Jiuquan	10,545
Yumen	Jiuquan	159,792
Dunhuang	Jiuquan	186,027
Xifeng	Qingyang	377,528
Qingcheng	Qingyang	261,898
Huan(xian)	Qingyang	302,918
Huachi	Qingyang	120,875
Heshui	Qingyang	145,722
Zhengning	Qingyang	180,909
Ning(xian)	Qingyang	405,614
Zhenyuan	Qingyang	415,727
Anding	Dingxi	420,614
Tongwei	Dingxi	349,539
Longxi	Dingxi	453,257
Weiyuan	Dingxi	324,215
Lintao	Dingxi	507,386
Zhang(xian)	Dingxi	192,957
Min(xian)	Dingxi	450,654
Wudu	Longnan	555,004
Cheng(xian)	Longnan	242,343
Wen(xian)	Longnan	218,796
Tanchang	Longnan	274,313
Kang(xian)	Longnan	180,061
Xihe	Longnan	393,272
Li(xian)	Longnan	458,237
Hui(xian)	Longnan	200,294
Liangdang	Longnan	45,398
Linxia(shi)	Linxia	274,466
Linxia(xian)	Linxia	326,123
Kangle	Linxia	233,173
Yongjing	Linxia	180,161
Guanghe	Linxia	227,466
Hezheng	Linxia	185,083
Dongxiang	Linxia	284,507
Jishishan	Linxia	235,698
Hezuo	Gannan	90,290
Lintan	Gannan	137,001
Zhuoni	Gannan	100,522
Zhugqu	Gannan	132,108
Diebu	Gannan	52,166
Maqu	Gannan	54,745
Luqu	Gannan	35,630
Xiahe	Gannan	86,670
