= Ankou (disambiguation) =

Ankou is a servant of death in Breton, Cornish, Welsh and Norman French folklore.

Ankou may also refer to any of the following:

== People ==
- Eli Ankou, an NFL player

== Art ==
- L'Ankou, the twenty-seventh album of the Spirou et Fantasio series of comics

== Towns in China ==
- Ankou, Huating, a town of Huating, Gansu
- Ankou, Liuhe, a town of Liuhe, Tonhua, Jilin

== Townships in China ==
- Ankou, Lishui, a township of Lishui, Zhejiang

== Other ==
- Ankou railway station in Changlai town, Lechang City, Guangdong
