= Xuanhua =

Xuanhua may refer to:

- Xuanhua District (宣化区), Zhangjiakou, Hebei, China
- Xuanhua, Gansu (宣化镇), town in Gaotai County, Gansu, China
- Xuanhua, Henan (宣化镇), town in Dengfeng City, Henan, China
- Hsuan Hua (1918–1995), or Xuanhua, influential Chan Buddhist monk
