= Changcheng =

Changcheng is the pinyin romanization of various Mandarin Chinese names.

It may refer to:

== "Great Wall", fortifications in China ==
- The Great Wall of China (长城, "The Long Wall")
  - Ming Great Wall
- Great Wall of Qi in Shandong
- Miaojiang Great Wall in western Hunan
- Cheolli Jangseong in northeast China
- Underground Great Wall of China
- Great Firewall

== Administrative divisions of China ==
- Changcheng District, a district of Jiayuguan, Gansu

=== Towns ===
- Changcheng, Shaanxi (长城), a town in Wuqi County, Shaanxi
- Changcheng, Lanling County (长城), a town in Lanling County, Shandong
- Changcheng, Zhucheng (昌城), a town in Zhucheng, Shandong

=== Townships ===
- Changcheng Township, Gansu (长城乡), in Wuwei, Gansu
- Changcheng Township, Hunan (长城乡), in Xiangtan, Hunan
- Changcheng Township, Shanxi (长城乡), in Yanggao County, Shanxi

=== Subdistricts ===
- Changcheng Subdistrict, Dalian (长城街道), in Lüshunkou District, Dalian, Liaoning
- Changcheng Subdistrict, Shizuishan (长城街道), in Dawukou District, Shizuishan, Ningxia
- Changcheng Subdistrict, Jiangyou (长城街道), in Jiangyou, Sichuan

== Film ==
- The Great Wall (2016 film), a Chinese film by Zhang Yimou
- Great Wall Film Company, a 1920s Chinese film company based in Shanghai
- Great Wall Movie Enterprises (1949–1982), a Chinese film company based in Hong Kong

== Others ==
- Great Wall Motor, a Chinese automobile manufacturer
- Great Wall Wine, a Chinese wine company
- Great Wall Station (Antarctica), a Chinese research station in Antarctica
- Great Wall Airlines, a defunct Chinese airline
- Great Wall Pan Asia Holdings, a Hong Kong property investment company
- Beijing Great Wall, a Chinese women's basketball team

== See also ==
- History of the Great Wall of China
- Great Wall (disambiguation)
- Chancheng District, a district of Foshan, Guangdong, China
- Changsong County, a county on the Chinese border in North Phyŏngan, North Korea, known in Chinese history as Changcheng
- Changcheng, Hainan (昌城), formerly Changhua
- Changchengopterus, an extinct pterosaur genus
- Changchengornis, an extinct bird genus
