= Huichuan, Weiyuan =

Huichuan 会川镇
- Town
- Interactive map of Huichuan

Area
  - Town: 71 km^{2} (27 sq mi)
- Elevation: 2,300 m (7,500 ft)

Population (1996)
  - Town: 29,232
  - Rural: 27,566

Huichuan is a town of Weiyuan County, Gansu, China. The town is located in the southwest of Weiyuan County, around 35 km away from the county seat of Weiyuan. It is named for being at the confluence of the Dahechuan and Xiaohechuan rivers. China National Highways 316 and 212 intersect in the town.

It was formerly known as Guanbao town (官堡镇). In 1944 Huichuan County was established. It was later merged into Weiyuan County.

The population in 1996 was 29,232 residents, the majority (27,566) in rural areas.

The 17,250 m² Tang dynasty Guanbao fort is located in the town seat Xiguan village.

== Notes ==
- a: Other source claims it was established in 1946.
