= Luomen, Wushan =

Luomen, Wushan 洛门镇
- Town
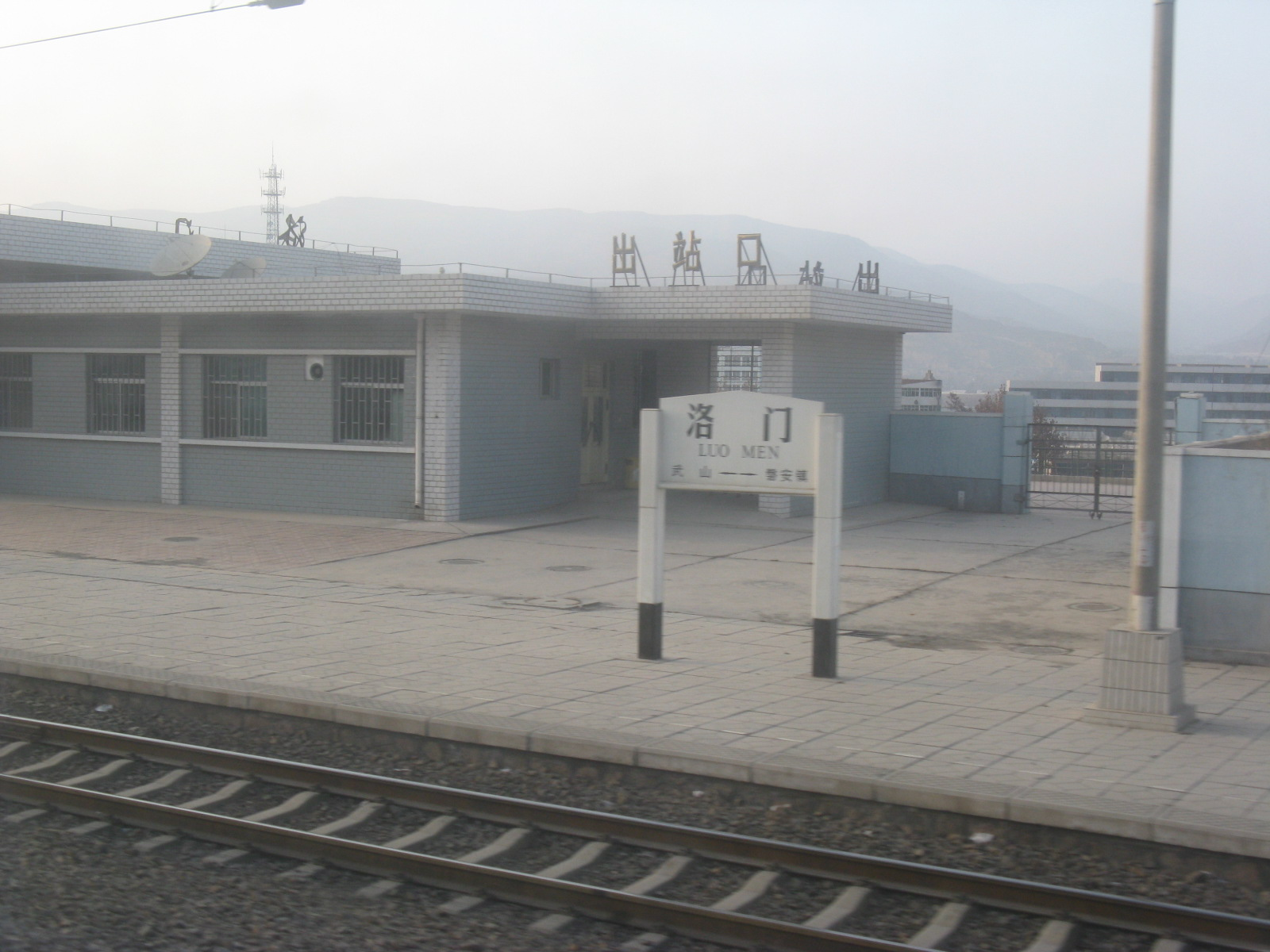
- Luomen Railway Station

- Location within China Location within Gansu
- Coordinates: 34.75°N 105.01°E

Area
  - Total: 114.68 km^{2} (44.28 sq mi)

Population (2008)
  - Total: 82,101

Luomen is a town of Wushan County, Tianshui, China. In 2008 the population was 82,101.

External image
- Panoramic view of Luomen

== History ==
Its history can be traced back to at least the Eastern Han dynasty, being formerly known by the homophone 落门. The name originates from the Luomen Valley. During the Conquest of Shu by Wei, the Shu army spent some time retreated in Luomen after running out of food supplies.

== Economy ==
The town has many markets for Traditional Chinese medicine materials, mountain products, bamboo and willow straw plaited goods, and vegetables and fruits. Several factories in the town undertake paper making, jade working, hookah production, leather tanning and others.

== Transport ==
The Longhai Railway and National Highway 316 pass through the town.

== Tourism ==
In the southwest of the town, there are ruins of Prince Kui Xiao's ca. 32 AD Summer Palace. Nearby the town are the Lashao caves and the Water Curtain cave, which has rock carvings dating to the Northern Wei era.
