= Anning, Lanzhou =

Anning 安宁区
- District
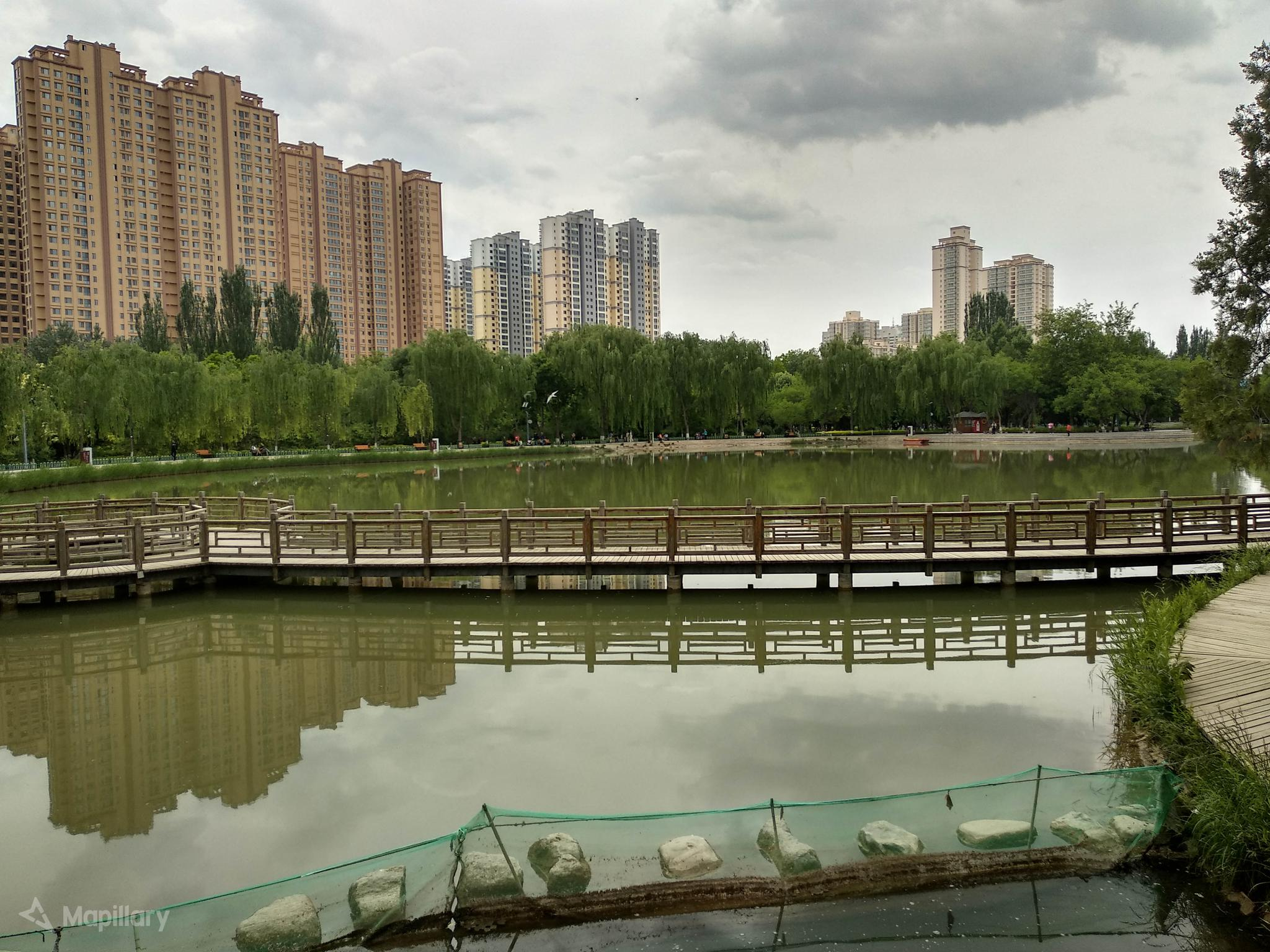
- Anning District from the Lanzhou Botanical Garden

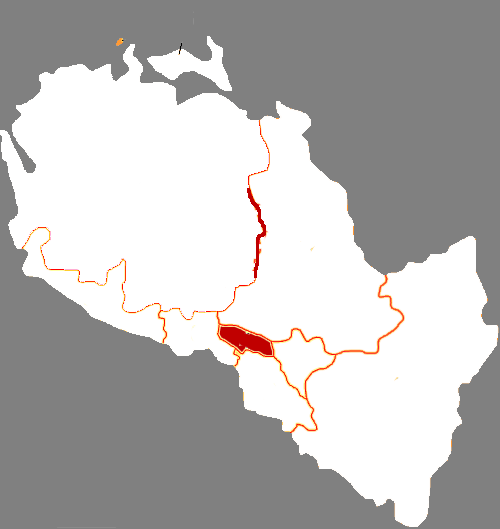
- Location in Lanzhou

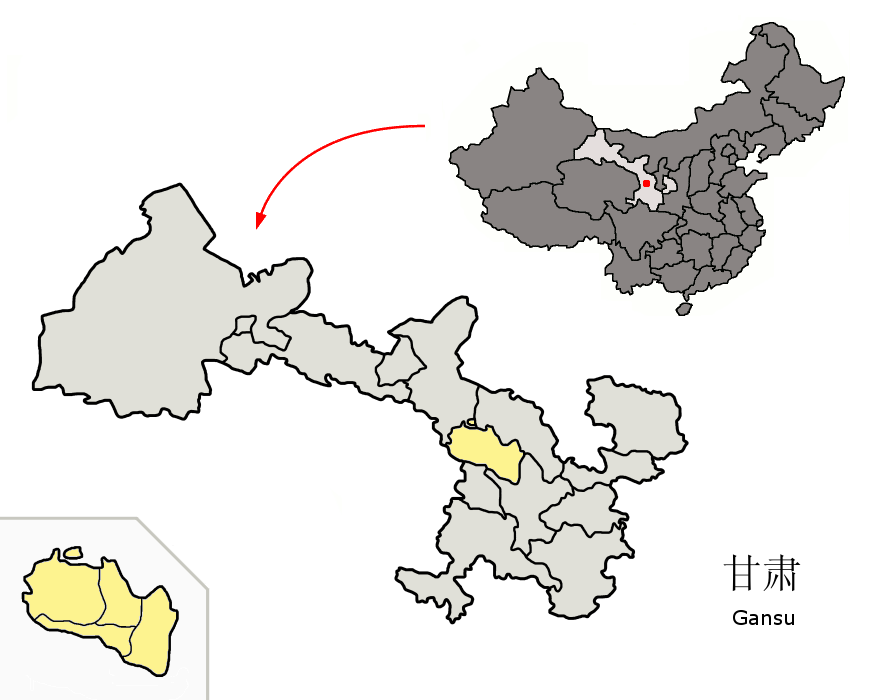
- Lanzhou in Gansu
- Coordinates: 36.1046°N 103.7191°E
- Country: China
- Province: Gansu
- Prefecture-level city: Lanzhou

Area
  - Total: 82.33 km^{2} (31.79 sq mi)

Population (2014 Census)
  - Total: 187,189
  - Density: 2,274/km^{2} (5,889/sq mi)
- Time zone: UTC+8 (China Standard)
- Postal code: 730070
- Website: www.lzanning.gov.cn

Anning District (simplified Chinese: 安宁区; traditional Chinese: 安寧區; pinyin: Ānníng Qū) is one of 5 districts of the prefecture-level city of Lanzhou, the capital of Gansu Province, Northwest China. It forms part of the urban core of Lanzhou. The district was established in 1953 and is named after a former Ming dynasty fort. It is known for having numerous peach orchards, since the Ming dynasty it has thus been nicknamed the '10-li peach county' (十里桃乡).

== Administrative divisions ==
Anning District is divided to 8 subdistricts and 2 towns.

Subdistricts

- Peili Subdistrict (培黎街道)
- Xilu Subdistrict (西路街道)
- Shajingyi Subdistrict (沙井驿街道)
- Shilidian Subdistrict (十里店街道)
- Kongjiaya Subdistrict (孔家崖街道)
- Yintanlu Subdistrict (银滩路街道)
- Liujiabao Subdistrict (刘家堡街道)
- Anningbao Subdistrict (安宁堡街道)

Towns

- Zhonghe Town (忠和镇)
- Jiuhe Town (九合镇)

== Education ==
The district is the home of several educational institutes:

- Northwest Normal University
- Lanzhou Jiaotong University
- Gansu Agricultural University
- Gansu College of Political Science and Law
- Lanzhou City College
- Gansu Provincial Party School
- Gansu Academy of Agricultural Sciences
- Gansu Academy of Social Sciences

The Lanzhou Botanical Garden is also located in the district.

== See also ==
- List of administrative divisions of Gansu
