= Weiyuan County, Gansu =

Weiyuan County 渭源县
- County
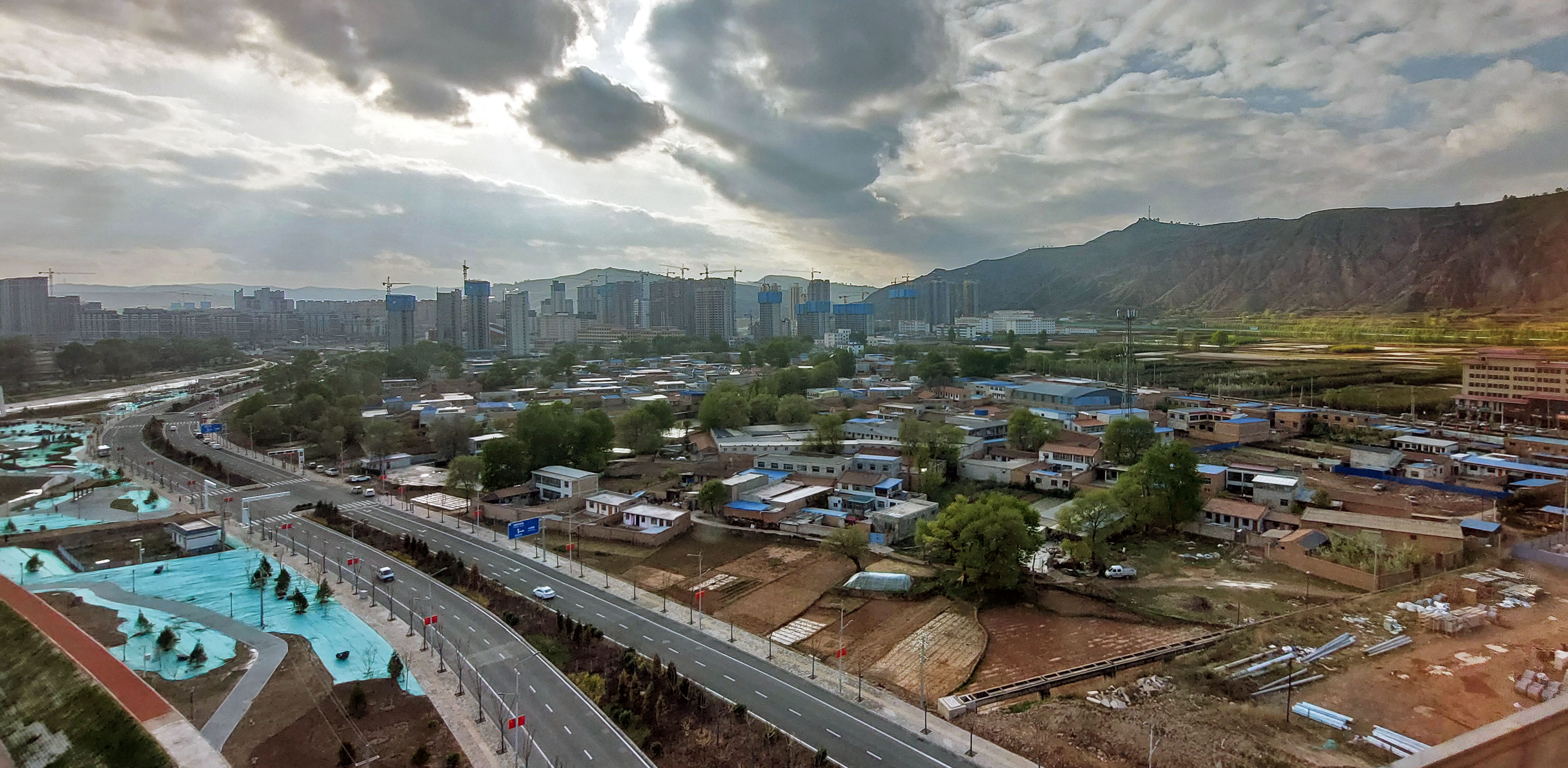

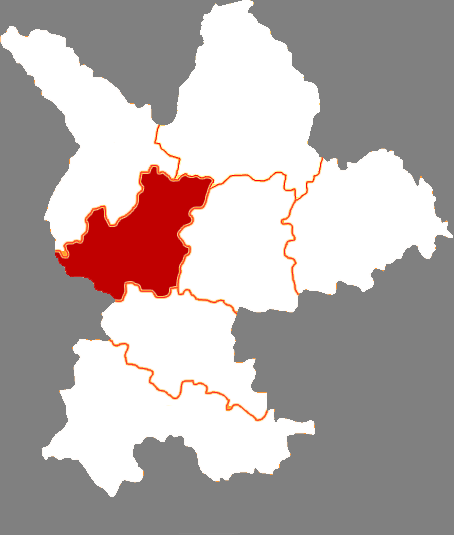
- Weiyuan in Dingxi

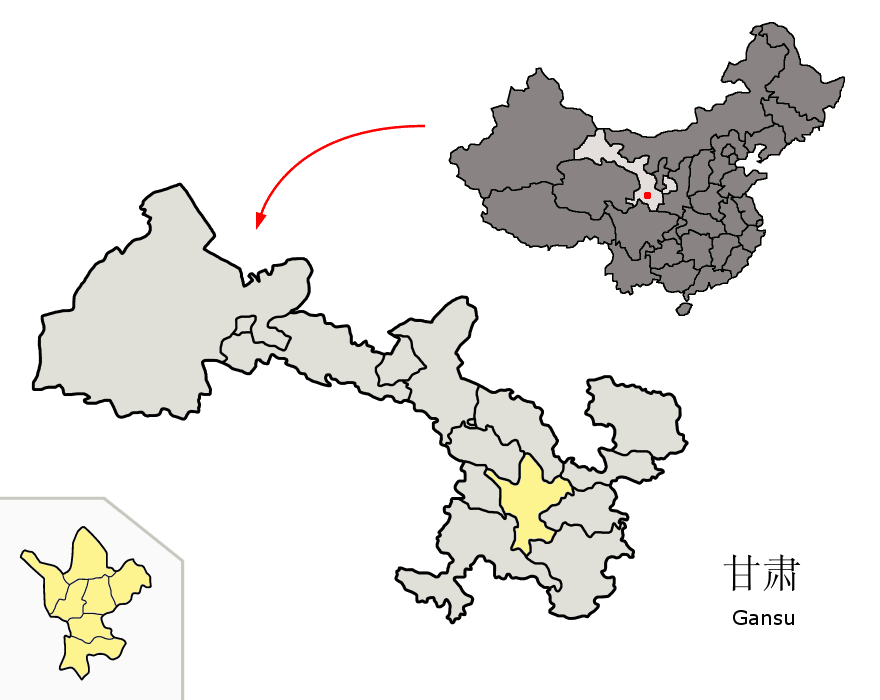
- Dingxi in Gansu
- Coordinates: 35°08′12″N 104°12′55″E
- Country: China
- Province: Gansu
- Prefecture-level city: Dingxi
- County seat: Qingyuan

Area
  - Land: 2,065 km^{2} (797 sq mi)

Population (2018)
  - Total: 345,000
  - Density: 167/km^{2} (433/sq mi)
- Time zone: UTC+8 (China Standard)
- Postal code: 748200

Weiyuan County is a county in Gansu province, China. It is under the administration of the prefecture-level city of Dingxi. Its postal code is 748200, and its population in 2018 was 345,000 people.

The county is named for being where the source of the Wei River is located.

Potatoes and traditional Chinese medicinal herbs such as Codonopsis, Angelica, Rhododendron and Astragalus form an important part of agricultural output. Furthermore, 485 kinds of wild Chinese herbal medicines are harvested.

Weiyuan has a long history with 49 ancient cultural sites in the county, including neolithic sites, a Ming Dynasty wooden bridge, and a section of the Qin dynasty Great Wall.

== Administrative divisions ==
Weiyuan County is divided to 12 towns and 4 townships.

Towns

- Qingyuan (清源镇)
- Lianfeng (莲峰镇)
- Huichuan (会川镇)
- Wuzhu (五竹镇)
- Luyuan (路园镇)
- Beizhai (北寨镇)
- Xinzhai (新寨镇)
- Majiaji (麻家集镇)
- Qiaoyu (锹峪镇)
- Qingping (庆坪镇)
- Qijiamiao (祁家庙镇)
- Shangwan (上湾镇)

Townships

- Da'an Township (大安乡)
- Qinqi Township (秦祁乡)
- Xiacheng Township (峡城乡)
- Tianjiahe Township (田家河乡)

== Climate ==
Climate data for Weiyuan, elevation 2,111 m (6,926 ft), (1991–2020 normals, extremes 1981–present)
Month	Jan	Feb	Mar	Apr	May	Jun	Jul	Aug	Sep	Oct	Nov	Dec	Year
Record high °C (°F)	13.9 (57.0)	18.6 (65.5)	24.8 (76.6)	27.8 (82.0)	29.6 (85.3)	30.5 (86.9)	34.0 (93.2)	31.9 (89.4)	30.0 (86.0)	23.4 (74.1)	18.9 (66.0)	12.5 (54.5)	34.0 (93.2)
Mean daily maximum °C (°F)	0.3 (32.5)	3.4 (38.1)	9.0 (48.2)	15.2 (59.4)	19.0 (66.2)	22.1 (71.8)	24.1 (75.4)	22.9 (73.2)	18.0 (64.4)	12.5 (54.5)	7.3 (45.1)	2.2 (36.0)	13.0 (55.4)
Daily mean °C (°F)	−6.8 (19.8)	−3.2 (26.2)	2.2 (36.0)	8.1 (46.6)	12.2 (54.0)	15.7 (60.3)	17.7 (63.9)	16.8 (62.2)	12.3 (54.1)	6.7 (44.1)	0.6 (33.1)	−5.1 (22.8)	6.4 (43.6)
Mean daily minimum °C (°F)	−11.8 (10.8)	−8.1 (17.4)	−2.7 (27.1)	2.1 (35.8)	6.2 (43.2)	10.1 (50.2)	12.3 (54.1)	11.9 (53.4)	8.4 (47.1)	2.8 (37.0)	−3.8 (25.2)	−9.9 (14.2)	1.5 (34.6)
Record low °C (°F)	−22.4 (−8.3)	−21.5 (−6.7)	−16.7 (1.9)	−9.2 (15.4)	−3.4 (25.9)	2.7 (36.9)	4.4 (39.9)	3.7 (38.7)	0.2 (32.4)	−10.0 (14.0)	−18.7 (−1.7)	−23.6 (−10.5)	−23.6 (−10.5)
Average precipitation mm (inches)	5.5 (0.22)	8.1 (0.32)	16.0 (0.63)	31.5 (1.24)	60.5 (2.38)	71.9 (2.83)	97.6 (3.84)	92.3 (3.63)	62.0 (2.44)	38.1 (1.50)	7.6 (0.30)	2.3 (0.09)	493.4 (19.42)
Average precipitation days (≥ 0.1 mm)	6.0	6.4	8.8	8.8	12.5	13.7	13.6	13.3	14.6	10.6	5.2	3.2	116.7
Average snowy days	8.9	8.6	8.9	3.4	0.4	0	0	0	0	2.2	5.4	5.4	43.2
Average relative humidity (%)	61	63	62	59	63	68	73	76	80	78	70	62	68
Mean monthly sunshine hours	192.4	176.9	195.9	211.0	221.1	206.1	213.4	194.2	136.6	145.8	177.0	200.0	2,270.4
Percentage possible sunshine	61	57	52	54	51	48	49	47	37	42	58	66	52
Source: China Meteorological Administration

== Transport ==
Weiyuan is served by Weiyuan railway station on the Lanzhou–Chongqing railway. The Lanzhou–Haikou Expressway (G75), China National Highway 212, 310 and 316 pass through the county.

== See also ==
- List of administrative divisions of Gansu
