= Lanzhou Botanical Garden =

Botanical garden in Lanzhou, China

Coordinates: 36.118124°N 103.701345°E

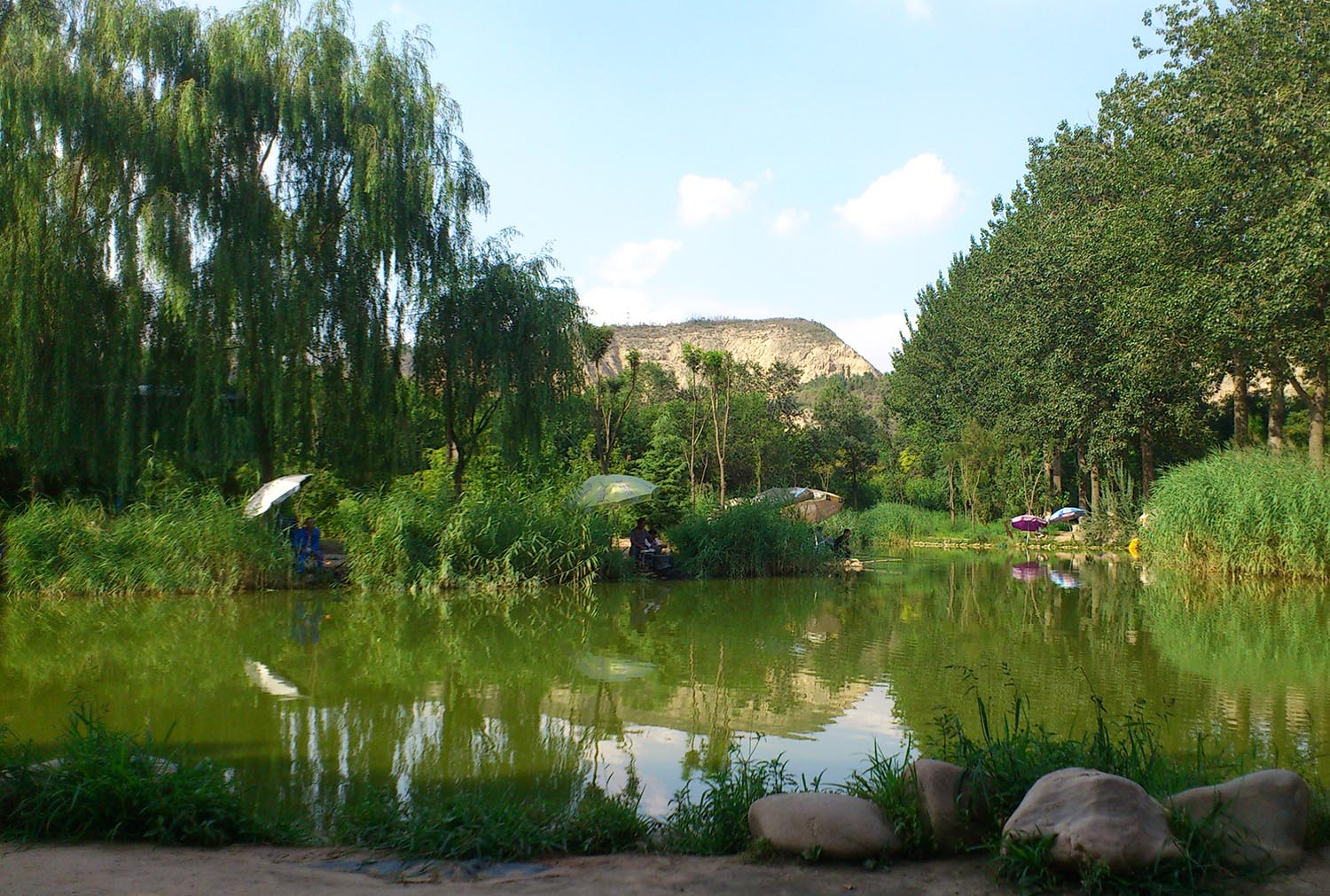
Lanzhou Botanical Garden Pond

The Lanzhou Botanical Garden (Chinese: 兰州植物园) is a botanical garden located in north-western part of the city's Anning District, near the Science Park of Lanzhou Jiaotong University. The 214 ha large park was constructed in 1993 and features over 200 plant species situated around a 19 ha pond

== See also ==
- List of Chinese gardens
- List of botanical gardens
