= Xiongguan, Jiayuguan =

District of Jiayuguan, China

Coordinates: 39.783°N 98.274°E

Xiongguan County (red) within Jiayuguan
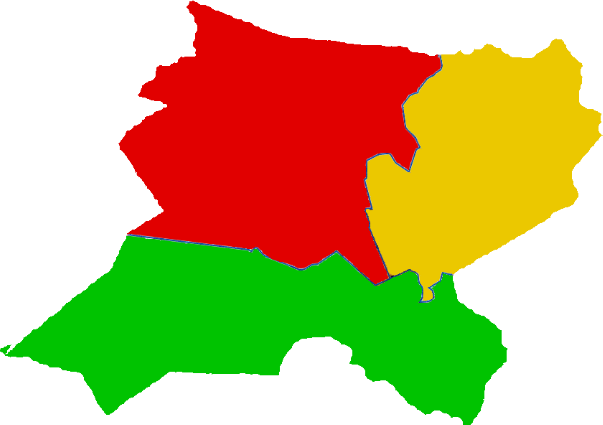

Xiongguan District (simplified Chinese: 雄关区; traditional Chinese: 雄關區; pinyin: Xióngguān Qū) is one of the three districts comprising the city of Jiayuguan, Gansu province, China. It was established on December 1, 2009. The district has been revoked.

== See also ==
- List of administrative divisions of Gansu
