= Qingshui County =

Qingshui County 清水县 Tsingshui
- County
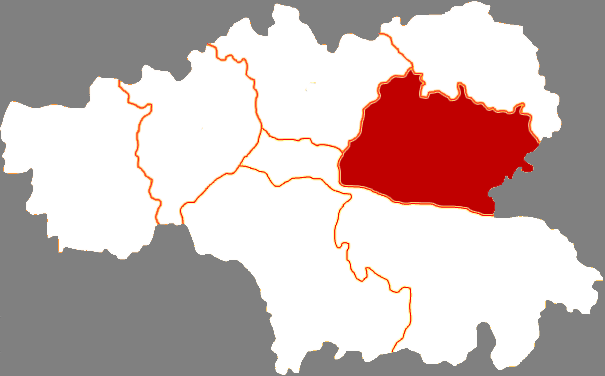
- Qingshui in Tianshui

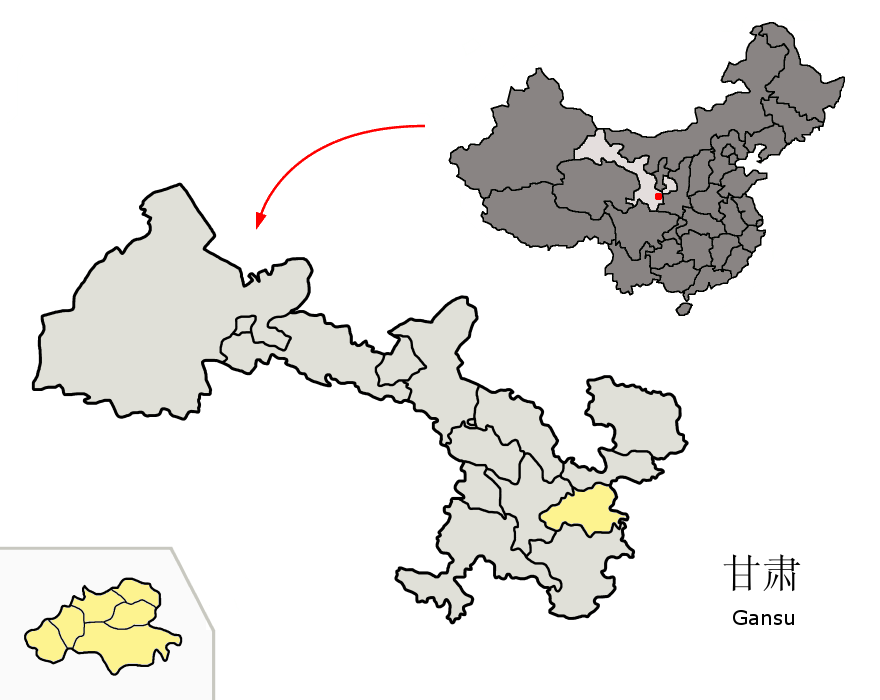
- Tianshui in Gansu
- Coordinates: 34°44′59″N 106°08′15″E
- Country: China
- Province: Gansu
- Prefecture-level city: Tianshui
- County seat: Yongqing

Area
  - County: 2,012 km^{2} (777 sq mi)

Population (2018)
  - County: 332,364
  - Density: 165.2/km^{2} (427.8/sq mi)
  - Rural: 298,800
- Time zone: UTC+8 (China Standard)
- Postal code: 741400
- Website: www.tsqs.gov.cn

Qingshui County (simplified Chinese: 清水县; traditional Chinese: 清水縣; pinyin: Qīngshuǐ Xiàn; lit. 'clearwater') is a county in Gansu province, China, bordering Shaanxi province to the east. It is under the administration of the prefecture-level city of Tianshui. In 2014 its population was 324,300 people, of which 298,800 was rural.

The area has been inhabited since prehistoric times with over 190 archaeological sites having been uncovered. In 115 B.C. a county called Shangju (上邽) was established in current Qingshui. It is the birthplace of Zhao Chongguo (赵充国), a famous Han dynasty general. According to some historians, Genghis Khan died in what is now Qingshui.

Qingshui has some of the most fertile agricultural lands in the region. Crops that are grown include wheat, corn, artichokes, beans, as well as economic crops such as Chinese medicinal plants, flax, sunflower, hemp, vegetables, and flowers.

== Administrative divisions ==
Qingshui County is divided to 15 towns and 3 townships:

Towns

- Yongqing (永清镇)
- Hongbao (红堡镇)
- Baituo (白驼镇)
- Jinji (金集镇)
- Qinting (秦亭镇)
- Shanmen (山门镇)
- Baisha (白沙镇)
- Wanghe (王河镇)
- Guochuan (郭川镇)
- Huangmen (黄门镇)
- Songshu (松树镇)
- Yuanmen (远门镇)
- Tumen (土门镇)
- Caochuanpu (草川铺镇)
- Longdong (陇东镇)

Townships

- Jiachuan Township (贾川乡)
- Fengwang Township (丰望乡)
- Xincheng Township (新城乡)

== Climate ==
Climate data for Qingshui, elevation 1,416 m (4,646 ft), (1991–2020 normals, extremes 1981–2010)
Month	Jan	Feb	Mar	Apr	May	Jun	Jul	Aug	Sep	Oct	Nov	Dec	Year
Record high °C (°F)	14.4 (57.9)	19.4 (66.9)	28.3 (82.9)	31.7 (89.1)	32.7 (90.9)	34.4 (93.9)	36.2 (97.2)	34.3 (93.7)	34.3 (93.7)	27.3 (81.1)	21.5 (70.7)	15.1 (59.2)	36.2 (97.2)
Mean daily maximum °C (°F)	3.7 (38.7)	7.0 (44.6)	12.8 (55.0)	19.2 (66.6)	22.9 (73.2)	26.4 (79.5)	28.1 (82.6)	26.8 (80.2)	21.5 (70.7)	16.1 (61.0)	10.4 (50.7)	5.0 (41.0)	16.7 (62.0)
Daily mean °C (°F)	−3.8 (25.2)	−0.1 (31.8)	5.3 (41.5)	11.2 (52.2)	15.3 (59.5)	19.1 (66.4)	21.4 (70.5)	20.2 (68.4)	15.4 (59.7)	9.5 (49.1)	3.3 (37.9)	−2.5 (27.5)	9.5 (49.1)
Mean daily minimum °C (°F)	−8.8 (16.2)	−5.0 (23.0)	−0.4 (31.3)	4.4 (39.9)	8.6 (47.5)	12.8 (55.0)	15.8 (60.4)	15.2 (59.4)	11.0 (51.8)	5.0 (41.0)	−1.4 (29.5)	−7.2 (19.0)	4.2 (39.5)
Record low °C (°F)	−23.1 (−9.6)	−19.3 (−2.7)	−13.1 (8.4)	−6.0 (21.2)	−1.5 (29.3)	3.2 (37.8)	6.3 (43.3)	6.6 (43.9)	0.8 (33.4)	−8.1 (17.4)	−15.0 (5.0)	−24.9 (−12.8)	−24.9 (−12.8)
Average precipitation mm (inches)	4.9 (0.19)	7.3 (0.29)	16.0 (0.63)	35.7 (1.41)	59.3 (2.33)	80.8 (3.18)	104.6 (4.12)	103.9 (4.09)	85.6 (3.37)	46.4 (1.83)	13.1 (0.52)	4.1 (0.16)	561.7 (22.12)
Average precipitation days (≥ 0.1 mm)	5.4	5.4	6.8	7.9	10.1	10.8	12.0	11.7	12.5	10.6	5.9	3.7	102.8
Average snowy days	7.7	6.6	3.3	0.7	0	0	0	0	0	0.4	3.0	5.1	26.8
Average relative humidity (%)	67	66	62	61	65	70	74	77	80	79	76	71	71
Mean monthly sunshine hours	160.7	146.0	179.8	208.9	222.7	209.7	210.2	198.3	137.5	130.5	147.6	164.8	2,116.7
Percentage possible sunshine	51	47	48	53	51	49	48	48	37	38	48	54	48
Source: China Meteorological Administration

== See also ==
- List of administrative divisions of Gansu
