= Chongxin County =

Chongxin County 崇信县 Tsungsin
- County
- Location of the seat in Gansu
- Coordinates: 35.302°N 107.035°E
- Country: China
- Province: Gansu
- Prefecture-level city: Pingliang
- County seat: Jinping

Area
  - County: 850 km^{2} (330 sq mi)
- Elevation: 1,393 m (4,570 ft)
- Highest elevation: 1,728 m (5,669 ft)
- Lowest elevation: 1,085.4 m (3,561 ft)

Population (2019)
  - County: 104,800
  - Density: 120/km^{2} (320/sq mi)
  - Urban: 22,800
  - Rural: 82,000
- Time zone: UTC+8 (China Standard)
- Postal code: 744000
- Website: chongxin.gov.cn

Chongxin (simplified Chinese: 崇信县; traditional Chinese: 崇信縣; pinyin: Chóngxìn Xiàn) is a county in the southeast of Gansu province, China, located 70 km (43 mi) northeast of Pingliang, which administers it. It borders Pingliang, Jinchuan County, to the east, Huating County to the west, and Long County to the south, which is part of Baoji, Shaanxi province.

Chongxin was established in 963 AD, its name being derived from 尊崇信任 (Zūnchóng xìnrèn), meaning 'respect and trust'. It has a population of 104,800. More than 80% of the population rely on farming, and have very poor living conditions. The government or municipality offices are mainly located in Jinping Town.

== Administrative divisions ==
Chongxin County is divided to 1 Subdistrict, 4 towns and 2 townships.

Subdistricts

- Chengshishequ (城市社区街道)

Towns

- Jinping (锦屏镇)
- Xinyao (新窑镇)

-Towns are upgraded from Township.

- Baishu (柏树镇) - it is renamed from Baishu Towns.
- Huangzhai (黄寨镇)

Townships

- Huanghua Township (黄花乡)
- Mulin Township (木林乡)

-Former Townships are merged to other.

- Jiugong Township (九功乡)
- Tongcheng Township (铜城乡)

== Climate ==
Climate data for Chongxin, elevation 1,149 m (3,770 ft), (1991–2020 normals, extremes 1981–2010)
Month	Jan	Feb	Mar	Apr	May	Jun	Jul	Aug	Sep	Oct	Nov	Dec	Year
Record high °C (°F)	16.7 (62.1)	23.1 (73.6)	29.7 (85.5)	33.1 (91.6)	34.0 (93.2)	37.1 (98.8)	37.8 (100.0)	36.4 (97.5)	35.8 (96.4)	28.9 (84.0)	23.1 (73.6)	19.9 (67.8)	37.8 (100.0)
Mean daily maximum °C (°F)	3.5 (38.3)	7.2 (45.0)	13.3 (55.9)	19.9 (67.8)	24.1 (75.4)	27.9 (82.2)	29.2 (84.6)	27.3 (81.1)	22.2 (72.0)	16.6 (61.9)	10.9 (51.6)	5.0 (41.0)	17.3 (63.1)
Daily mean °C (°F)	−3.3 (26.1)	0.5 (32.9)	6.2 (43.2)	12.4 (54.3)	16.8 (62.2)	20.9 (69.6)	22.9 (73.2)	21.4 (70.5)	16.5 (61.7)	10.4 (50.7)	4.0 (39.2)	−1.8 (28.8)	10.6 (51.0)
Mean daily minimum °C (°F)	−8.2 (17.2)	−4.5 (23.9)	0.7 (33.3)	6.2 (43.2)	10.5 (50.9)	14.8 (58.6)	17.8 (64.0)	17.0 (62.6)	12.4 (54.3)	6.0 (42.8)	−0.8 (30.6)	−6.6 (20.1)	5.4 (41.8)
Record low °C (°F)	−19.3 (−2.7)	−17.1 (1.2)	−11.5 (11.3)	−4.7 (23.5)	0.3 (32.5)	6.6 (43.9)	10.7 (51.3)	7.9 (46.2)	2.2 (36.0)	−6.5 (20.3)	−14.0 (6.8)	−22.4 (−8.3)	−22.4 (−8.3)
Average precipitation mm (inches)	5.0 (0.20)	7.1 (0.28)	16.5 (0.65)	31.1 (1.22)	47.1 (1.85)	65.0 (2.56)	110.8 (4.36)	97.6 (3.84)	81.0 (3.19)	43.3 (1.70)	12.7 (0.50)	2.4 (0.09)	519.6 (20.44)
Average precipitation days (≥ 0.1 mm)	4.1	5.1	6.4	7.1	9.5	10.1	11.1	12.1	12.0	9.9	5.3	2.4	95.1
Average snowy days	6.3	6.5	3.6	0.6	0	0	0	0	0	0.4	3.2	4.7	25.3
Average relative humidity (%)	57	57	56	54	59	63	70	75	78	75	66	59	64
Mean monthly sunshine hours	168.5	155.2	182.8	207.3	226.2	221.2	211.4	185.7	145.3	151.2	163.0	172.2	2,190
Percentage possible sunshine	54	50	49	53	52	51	48	45	40	44	53	57	50
Source: China Meteorological Administration

== Education ==
No.1 Chongxin County High School was the only high school to some extent in this county before 2000.

Daxing Primary School, as of 2016, has 40 students in multi-grade classrooms and five teachers, none of whom have university degrees. All of the teachers were men in their 50s.
