= Wushan County, Gansu =

Wushan County 武山县
- County
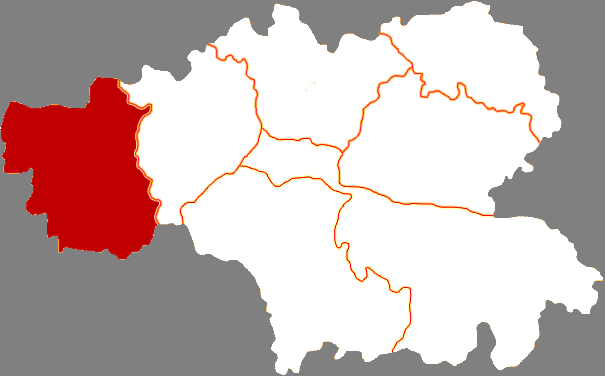
- Wushan in Tianshui

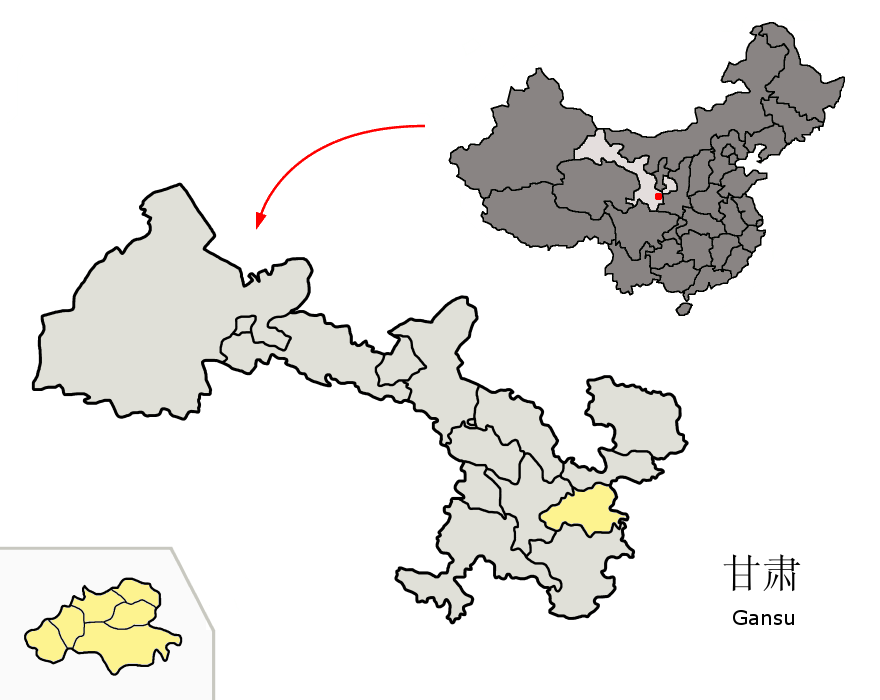
- Tianshui in Gansu
- Coordinates: 34°43′17″N 104°53′26″E
- Country: China
- Province: Gansu
- Prefecture-level city: Tianshui
- County seat: Chengguan

Area
  - Total: 2,011 km^{2} (776 sq mi)
- Highest elevation: 3,120 m (10,240 ft)
- Lowest elevation: 1,340 m (4,400 ft)

Population (2017)
  - Total: 500,000
  - Density: 250/km^{2} (640/sq mi)
- Time zone: UTC+8 (China Standard)
- Postal code: 741300
- Website: www.wushan.gov.cn

Wushan County (simplified Chinese: 武山县; traditional Chinese: 武山縣; pinyin: Wǔshān Xiàn) is a county in the east of Gansu Province of China. It is under the administration of the prefecture-level city of Tianshui. Its postal code is 741300, and in 1999 its population was 418,648 people. The population in 2017 was 500,000 people.

== History ==
Humans have inhabited the area since at least 38,000 years ago. The county was knows as Xinxing (新兴县) during the Eastern Han Dynasty (188 AD). During the Song dynasty it was named Ningyuan (宁远县). Since the Republic of China it holds the current name.

== Administrative divisions ==
Wushan County is divided to 13 towns and 2 townships.

Towns

- Chengguan (城关镇)
- Luomen (洛门镇)
- Yuanyang (鸳鸯镇)
- Tange (滩歌镇)
- Simen (四门镇)
- Mali (马力镇)
- Shandan (山丹镇)
- Wenquan (温泉镇)
- Hualin (桦林镇)
- Longtai (龙台镇)
- Yupan (榆盘镇)
- Gaolou (高楼镇)
- Yanghe (杨河镇)

Townships

- Zuitou Township (咀头乡)
- Yan'an Township (沿安乡)

== Climate ==
Climate data for Wushan, elevation 1,495 m (4,905 ft), (1991–2020 normals, extremes 1981–present)
Month	Jan	Feb	Mar	Apr	May	Jun	Jul	Aug	Sep	Oct	Nov	Dec	Year
Record high °C (°F)	12.5 (54.5)	18.8 (65.8)	26.7 (80.1)	30.9 (87.6)	31.3 (88.3)	34.4 (93.9)	37.0 (98.6)	34.7 (94.5)	34.1 (93.4)	26.7 (80.1)	19.6 (67.3)	13.5 (56.3)	37.0 (98.6)
Mean daily maximum °C (°F)	2.2 (36.0)	6.2 (43.2)	12.4 (54.3)	18.9 (66.0)	22.8 (73.0)	26.4 (79.5)	28.4 (83.1)	27.1 (80.8)	21.5 (70.7)	15.3 (59.5)	9.3 (48.7)	3.6 (38.5)	16.2 (61.1)
Daily mean °C (°F)	−3.1 (26.4)	0.7 (33.3)	6.2 (43.2)	12.0 (53.6)	16.1 (61.0)	19.9 (67.8)	22.1 (71.8)	21.0 (69.8)	16.1 (61.0)	10.2 (50.4)	3.9 (39.0)	−1.8 (28.8)	10.3 (50.5)
Mean daily minimum °C (°F)	−7.3 (18.9)	−3.6 (25.5)	1.3 (34.3)	6.2 (43.2)	10.3 (50.5)	14.3 (57.7)	17.0 (62.6)	16.2 (61.2)	12.2 (54.0)	6.4 (43.5)	−0.1 (31.8)	−5.7 (21.7)	5.6 (42.1)
Record low °C (°F)	−17.5 (0.5)	−16.5 (2.3)	−9.5 (14.9)	−3.9 (25.0)	0.2 (32.4)	6.3 (43.3)	10.5 (50.9)	8.6 (47.5)	3.8 (38.8)	−5.2 (22.6)	−12.2 (10.0)	−16.6 (2.1)	−17.5 (0.5)
Average precipitation mm (inches)	5.2 (0.20)	7.2 (0.28)	15.2 (0.60)	28.7 (1.13)	51.1 (2.01)	64.5 (2.54)	71.9 (2.83)	73.7 (2.90)	55.5 (2.19)	40.1 (1.58)	8.3 (0.33)	2.0 (0.08)	423.4 (16.67)
Average precipitation days (≥ 0.1 mm)	5.1	5.1	7.3	8.3	10.7	11.1	11.6	11.1	13.0	10.2	4.5	2.2	100.2
Average snowy days	8.0	7.0	4.7	1.0	0	0	0	0	0	0.3	3.1	4.6	28.7
Average relative humidity (%)	61	61	59	58	61	64	67	71	77	77	71	63	66
Mean monthly sunshine hours	163.9	154.5	181.9	214.9	226.6	218.6	232.7	221.4	151.7	141.1	155.5	171.6	2,234.4
Percentage possible sunshine	52	50	49	55	52	51	53	54	41	41	51	56	50
Source: China Meteorological Administration all-time January high

== Economy ==
Agricultural produce from Wushan are wheat, artichoke, flax, rapeseed, tomato, carrot, Amaranth grain, Codonopsis and Angelica. Iron, copper and molybdenum mines are also present in the county.

== Culture ==
Cuisine

Wushan food is a mix of Lanzhou, Sichuan and Tibetan cuisine. Specialities from the region are:

- Donut shaped Youtiao
- Pork and beef hotpot
- Barbecue trout
- Liangpi
- Dandan noodles
- Jiaotuan: sticky corn-flour jelly
- Jiangshui (浆水): a kind of sour vegetable soup
- Tianpei: Sweet highland barley dessert
- Fried artichoke balls (洋芋丸子): Deep-fried flour-artichoke balls
- Sanfan (馓饭): glutinous flour soup with beans
- Guanguan tea (罐罐茶) – a kind of tea brewed with rock sugar, jujube, Chinese wolfberry and longan in a clay pot on a fire.

== See also ==
- List of administrative divisions of Gansu
