= Kang County =

Kang County 康县
- County
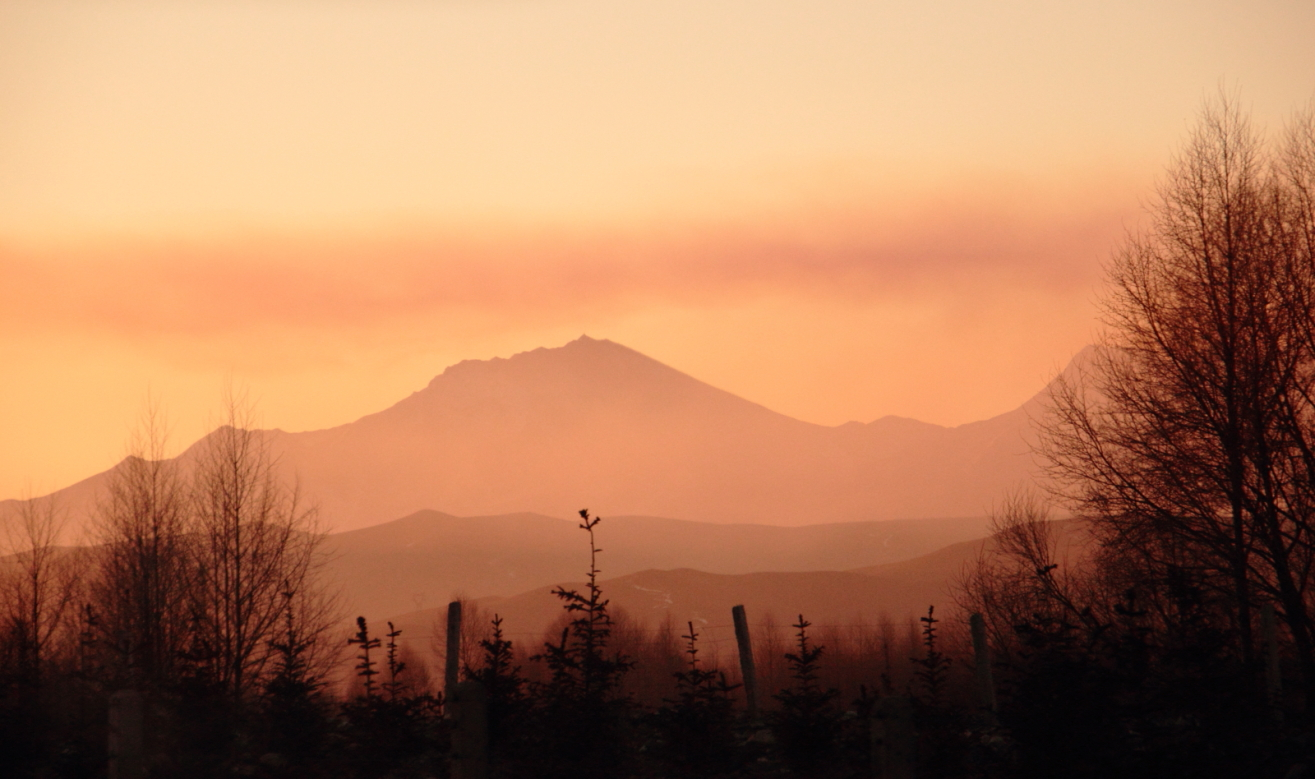

- Location of the seat in Gansu
- Coordinates: 33.329°N 105.609°E
- Country: China
- Province: Gansu
- Prefecture-level city: Longnan
- County seat: Chengguan

Area
  - Total: 2,958.46 km^{2} (1,142.27 sq mi)

Population (2017)
  - Total: 170,717
  - Density: 57.7047/km^{2} (149.454/sq mi)
- Time zone: UTC+8 (China Standard)
- Postal code: 746500
- Website: www.gskx.gov.cn

Kang County or Kangxian (simplified Chinese: 康县; traditional Chinese: 康縣; pinyin: Kāng Xiàn) is a county in the southeast of Gansu province, China. It is under the administration of Longnan City. The county was formed in 1928 as Wudu County, but renamed to Kang County the next year, named after the northern Zhou dynasty place Kangzhou.

== Administrative divisions ==
The county was subdivided in 18 towns and 3 townships.

Towns

- Chengguan (城关镇)
- Pingluo (平洛镇)
- Dabao (大堡镇)
- Anmenkou (岸门口镇)
- Lianghe (两河镇)
- Changba (长坝镇)
- Yuntai (云台镇)
- Yangba (阳坝镇)

-Towns are upgraded from Township.

- Wangba (王坝镇)
- Douba (豆坝镇)
- Wangguan (望关镇)
- Sitai (寺台镇)
- Baiyang (白杨镇)
- Tongqian (铜钱镇)
- Sanheba (三河坝镇)
- Nianba (碾坝镇)
- Dananyu (大南峪镇)
- Zhoujiaba (周家坝镇) - it is renamed from Douping (豆坪乡).

Townships

- Miba Township (迷坝乡)
- Dianzi Township (店子乡)
- Taishi Township (太石乡)

== Demographics ==
The county is majority Han, with Hui, Manchu, Zhuang, Tibetan, Mongolian, Yao, and Uygur minority groups. The total population is 203,400 people.

Year	Population	Urban	Rural
1999	199,570		
2011	202,400	18,800	183,600
	203,400		

== Climate ==
Climate data for Kangxian, elevation 1,221 m (4,006 ft), (1991–2020 normals, extremes 1981–2010)
Month	Jan	Feb	Mar	Apr	May	Jun	Jul	Aug	Sep	Oct	Nov	Dec	Year
Record high °C (°F)	16.0 (60.8)	19.1 (66.4)	27.0 (80.6)	30.8 (87.4)	32.5 (90.5)	35.0 (95.0)	34.9 (94.8)	35.5 (95.9)	32.5 (90.5)	26.4 (79.5)	20.5 (68.9)	17.0 (62.6)	35.5 (95.9)
Mean daily maximum °C (°F)	5.0 (41.0)	7.5 (45.5)	12.8 (55.0)	18.9 (66.0)	22.6 (72.7)	25.8 (78.4)	27.5 (81.5)	26.5 (79.7)	21.2 (70.2)	16.1 (61.0)	11.5 (52.7)	6.5 (43.7)	16.8 (62.3)
Daily mean °C (°F)	−0.1 (31.8)	2.6 (36.7)	7.0 (44.6)	12.3 (54.1)	16.0 (60.8)	19.5 (67.1)	21.6 (70.9)	20.8 (69.4)	16.5 (61.7)	11.5 (52.7)	6.3 (43.3)	1.1 (34.0)	11.3 (52.3)
Mean daily minimum °C (°F)	−3.9 (25.0)	−1.1 (30.0)	2.6 (36.7)	7.1 (44.8)	10.9 (51.6)	14.6 (58.3)	17.2 (63.0)	16.9 (62.4)	13.4 (56.1)	8.5 (47.3)	2.7 (36.9)	−2.8 (27.0)	7.2 (44.9)
Record low °C (°F)	−14.6 (5.7)	−11.8 (10.8)	−8.8 (16.2)	−2.8 (27.0)	1.2 (34.2)	6.4 (43.5)	10.3 (50.5)	8.7 (47.7)	3.5 (38.3)	−4.0 (24.8)	−8.0 (17.6)	−16.7 (1.9)	−16.7 (1.9)
Average precipitation mm (inches)	8.0 (0.31)	11.8 (0.46)	28.0 (1.10)	50.8 (2.00)	88.0 (3.46)	88.5 (3.48)	153.5 (6.04)	133.0 (5.24)	119.2 (4.69)	65.0 (2.56)	18.7 (0.74)	5.9 (0.23)	770.4 (30.31)
Average precipitation days (≥ 0.1 mm)	8.5	9.2	11.6	11.0	13.8	12.8	14.5	14.2	16.3	15.1	9.4	6.5	142.9
Average snowy days	12.1	8.4	3.1	0.4	0	0	0	0	0	0.1	1.9	6.2	32.2
Average relative humidity (%)	71	71	70	70	74	77	81	83	86	85	79	73	77
Mean monthly sunshine hours	112.4	94.8	123.4	156.7	174.2	160.8	173.2	161.8	90.5	89.4	104.8	120.7	1,562.7
Percentage possible sunshine	35	30	33	40	40	38	40	40	25	26	34	39	35
Source: China Meteorological Administration

== Economy ==
The economy of Kangxian is mainly based around agriculture. Crops of major importance are wheat, corn, potatoes, soybeans, and white beans. The county is also a major producer of edible mushrooms such as black wood ear, it also produces a domestically popular Longshen green tea, walnuts, mulberry and silkworm cocoons. In recent years, eco-tourism has become of some importance.

== See also ==
- List of administrative divisions of Gansu
