= Ankou, Huating =

Ankou 安口镇
- Town
- Location in China
- Coordinates: 35.22646°N 106.79649°E
- Country: China
- Province: Gansu
- Prefecture-level city: Pingliang City
- County: Huating

Area
  - Town: 171.46 km^{2} (66.20 sq mi)
- Highest elevation: 1,693 m (5,554 ft)
- Lowest elevation: 1,260 m (4,130 ft)

Population
  - Town: 29,000
  - Rural: 14,853
- Time zone: UTC+8 (China Standard Time)

Ankou is a town of Huating County, Pingliang City, Gansu, China. The town is highly industrialized.

The town was home to a large coal mine, which opened in 1954 and closed in 2004. The mountains around the town are also rich in various mineral and silicates which have been used for ceramics production going back 2,000 years.
