= Stirred dough =

Stir-fried dough snack made from corn flour

- Simplified: 搅团
- Traditional: 攪團
- Also translated as: stirred paste sticky corn-flour jelly

The stirred dough (simplified Chinese: 搅团; traditional Chinese: 攪團), known as jiaotuan in Chinese, also translated as stirred paste, sticky corn-flour jelly, is a snack from Northwest China, defined as a kind of "paste made of flour".

The origin of the stirred dough cannot be verified, although its inventions has been traditionally attributed to Zhuge Liang from the Three Kingdoms period. At that time, the name was not yet called "stirred dough", but was figuratively called "water surrounding the city".
