= Huating, Gansu =

Huating 华亭市 Hwating
- County-level city
- Location in Gansu Huating (China)
- Coordinates: 35°13′N 106°36′E
- Country: China
- Province: Gansu
- Prefecture-level city: Pingliang
- Municipal seat: Donghua Town

Area
  - Total: 1,183 km^{2} (457 sq mi)
- Elevation: 1,300 m (4,300 ft)

Population (2020 census)
  - Total: 182,449
  - Density: 154.2/km^{2} (399.4/sq mi)
- Time zone: UTC+8 (China Standard)
- Postal code: 744100
- Website: www.gsht.gov.cn

Huating (simplified Chinese: 华亭; traditional Chinese: 華亭; pinyin: Huátíng) is a county-level city, formerly Huating County, in the east of Gansu province, China, bordering Ningxia to the northwest. It is under the administration of the Pingliang city. Its postal code is 744100, and in 1999, its population was 176,941 people.

Huating was first established in 605 CE. It is named after Huajian Mountain (华尖山). In 2018, Huating county was upgraded to Huating county-level city.

Huating has long been a center of coal mining and porcelain production in Gansu. In 2006, it produced over 14 million tons of coal. The agriculture output of Huating is centered around walnuts, medicinal plants, in particular Ligusticum striatum, and beef cattle.

In July 2010, 13 people died in Huating County in a landslide triggered by heavy rains. Two people survived.

== Administrative divisions ==
Huating City is divided to 1 subdistrict, 7 towns, 3 townships and 1 others.

Subdistricts

- Donghua Subdistrict (东华街道)

Towns

- Donghua (东华镇)
- Ankou (安口镇)
- Xihua (西华镇)
- Maxia (马峡镇)
- Cedi (策底镇)
- Shangguan (上关镇)
- Hexi (河西镇)

Townships

- Shenyu Township (神峪乡)
- Shanzhai Township (山寨乡)
- Yanxia Township (砚峡乡)

Others

- Shibaozi Development Zone Management Committee (石堡子开发区管委会)

== Climate ==
Climate data for Huating, elevation 1,478 m (4,849 ft), (1991–2020 normals, extremes 1981–2010)
Month	Jan	Feb	Mar	Apr	May	Jun	Jul	Aug	Sep	Oct	Nov	Dec	Year
Record high °C (°F)	16.0 (60.8)	22.1 (71.8)	27.2 (81.0)	31.0 (87.8)	32.6 (90.7)	34.0 (93.2)	35.0 (95.0)	33.0 (91.4)	33.6 (92.5)	26.3 (79.3)	21.9 (71.4)	17.9 (64.2)	35.0 (95.0)
Mean daily maximum °C (°F)	2.1 (35.8)	5.0 (41.0)	10.8 (51.4)	17.3 (63.1)	21.4 (70.5)	25.1 (77.2)	26.2 (79.2)	24.5 (76.1)	19.6 (67.3)	14.4 (57.9)	9.2 (48.6)	3.7 (38.7)	14.9 (58.9)
Daily mean °C (°F)	−5.6 (21.9)	−2.0 (28.4)	3.7 (38.7)	10.0 (50.0)	14.5 (58.1)	18.5 (65.3)	20.5 (68.9)	19.1 (66.4)	14.3 (57.7)	8.3 (46.9)	1.8 (35.2)	−4.0 (24.8)	8.3 (46.9)
Mean daily minimum °C (°F)	−11.0 (12.2)	−7.0 (19.4)	−1.7 (28.9)	3.3 (37.9)	7.6 (45.7)	11.9 (53.4)	15.2 (59.4)	14.5 (58.1)	10.1 (50.2)	3.8 (38.8)	−3.0 (26.6)	−9.0 (15.8)	2.9 (37.2)
Record low °C (°F)	−23.9 (−11.0)	−21.3 (−6.3)	−15.5 (4.1)	−8.0 (17.6)	−3.7 (25.3)	2.4 (36.3)	6.9 (44.4)	4.9 (40.8)	−0.5 (31.1)	−9.6 (14.7)	−16.8 (1.8)	−30.2 (−22.4)	−30.2 (−22.4)
Average precipitation mm (inches)	5.6 (0.22)	7.8 (0.31)	17.7 (0.70)	30.6 (1.20)	55.7 (2.19)	80.9 (3.19)	118.4 (4.66)	119.4 (4.70)	94.0 (3.70)	48.1 (1.89)	13.7 (0.54)	2.8 (0.11)	594.7 (23.41)
Average precipitation days (≥ 0.1 mm)	4.8	5.7	6.9	7.3	10.1	10.8	13.4	13.1	13.3	11.1	5.8	2.9	105.2
Average snowy days	8.5	8.9	6.0	1.1	0	0	0	0	0	0.7	5.0	6.4	36.6
Average relative humidity (%)	65	66	64	60	64	69	76	80	83	80	74	67	71
Mean monthly sunshine hours	166.2	150.8	177.2	201.9	217.1	210.2	201.1	181.9	140.9	146.4	162.7	173.0	2,129.4
Percentage possible sunshine	53	48	47	51	50	48	46	44	38	42	53	57	48
Source: China Meteorological Administration

== See also ==
- List of administrative divisions of Gansu
