= Changcheng, Jiayuguan =

District of Jiayuguan, Gansu, China

Districts within Jiayuguan
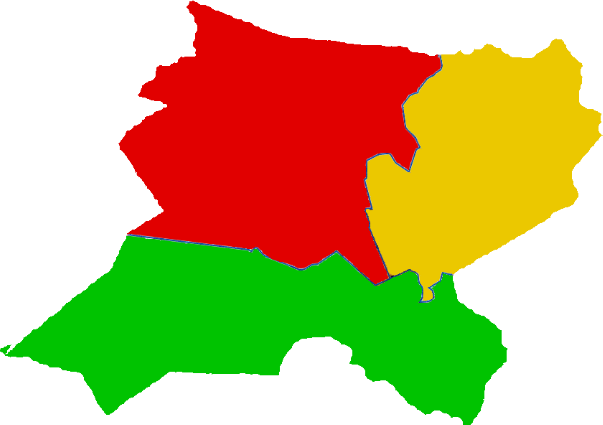

Changcheng District is one of the three districts comprising the city of Jiayuguan, Gansu province, China.
