= Gaotai County =

Gaotai County 高台县
- County
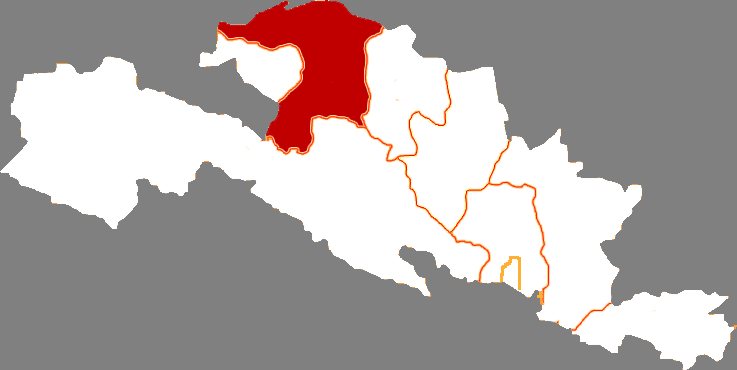
- Gaotai in Zhangye

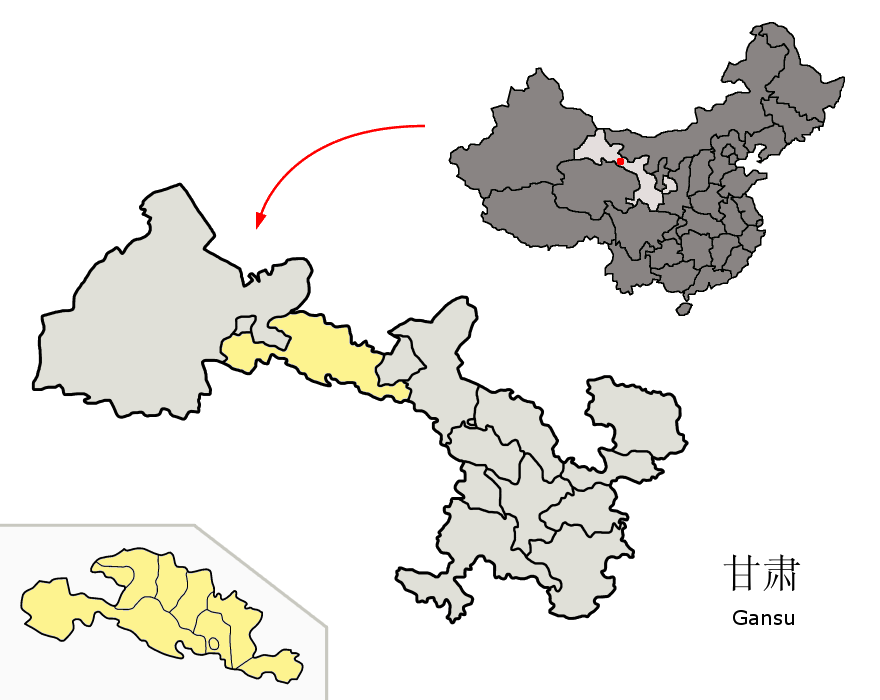
- Zhangye in Gansu
- Coordinates: 39°22′09″N 99°48′49″E
- Country: China
- Province: Gansu
- Prefecture-level city: Zhangye
- County seat: Chengguan

Area
  - Total: 4,346.61 km^{2} (1,678.24 sq mi)

Population (2018)
  - Total: 158,360
  - Density: 36.433/km^{2} (94.361/sq mi)
- Time zone: UTC+8 (China Standard)
- Postal code: 734300

Gaotai County (Chinese: 高台县; pinyin: Gāotái Xiàn) is a county in Gansu Province, China, bordering Inner Mongolia to the northeast. It is under the administration of the prefecture-level city of Zhangye. Its postal code is 734300, and in 1999 its population was 155,260 people.

== Administrative divisions ==
Gaotai County is divided to 9 towns and 1 other.

Towns

- Chengguan (城关镇)
- Xuanhua (宣化镇)
- Nanhua (南华镇)
- Hangdao (巷道镇)
- Heli (合黎镇)
- Luotuocheng (骆驼城镇)
- Xinba (新坝镇)
- Heiquan (黑泉镇)
- Luocheng (罗城镇)

Others

- Gansu Gaotai Industrial Park (甘肃高台工业园区)

== Climate ==
Climate data for Gaotai, elevation 1,332 m (4,370 ft), (1991–2020 normals, extremes 1981–present)
Month	Jan	Feb	Mar	Apr	May	Jun	Jul	Aug	Sep	Oct	Nov	Dec	Year
Record high °C (°F)	11.6 (52.9)	18.5 (65.3)	26.4 (79.5)	35.1 (95.2)	35.1 (95.2)	35.8 (96.4)	40.0 (104.0)	36.5 (97.7)	35.6 (96.1)	30.3 (86.5)	22.0 (71.6)	16.2 (61.2)	40.0 (104.0)
Mean daily maximum °C (°F)	−1.0 (30.2)	4.8 (40.6)	12.1 (53.8)	19.9 (67.8)	25.0 (77.0)	29.1 (84.4)	30.9 (87.6)	29.3 (84.7)	24.5 (76.1)	17.5 (63.5)	8.5 (47.3)	0.5 (32.9)	16.8 (62.2)
Daily mean °C (°F)	−9.0 (15.8)	−3.5 (25.7)	3.8 (38.8)	11.6 (52.9)	17.1 (62.8)	21.6 (70.9)	23.4 (74.1)	21.4 (70.5)	15.6 (60.1)	8.0 (46.4)	0.3 (32.5)	−7.0 (19.4)	8.6 (47.5)
Mean daily minimum °C (°F)	−15.0 (5.0)	−10.0 (14.0)	−3.0 (26.6)	3.9 (39.0)	9.0 (48.2)	13.8 (56.8)	16.1 (61.0)	14.4 (57.9)	8.7 (47.7)	1.0 (33.8)	−5.4 (22.3)	−12.5 (9.5)	1.8 (35.2)
Record low °C (°F)	−30.6 (−23.1)	−29.9 (−21.8)	−20.9 (−5.6)	−7.2 (19.0)	−3.5 (25.7)	3.4 (38.1)	7.0 (44.6)	3.9 (39.0)	−2.5 (27.5)	−17.4 (0.7)	−20.5 (−4.9)	−29.8 (−21.6)	−30.6 (−23.1)
Average precipitation mm (inches)	2.7 (0.11)	1.4 (0.06)	4.8 (0.19)	6.1 (0.24)	10.3 (0.41)	16.2 (0.64)	25.2 (0.99)	22.0 (0.87)	16.6 (0.65)	4.5 (0.18)	2.4 (0.09)	3.5 (0.14)	115.7 (4.57)
Average precipitation days (≥ 0.1 mm)	3.0	1.9	2.8	2.5	4.4	5.5	8.0	7.0	4.6	1.8	2.1	2.8	46.4
Average snowy days	4.1	2.9	2.9	0.8	0.2	0	0	0	0	0.6	2.7	4.0	18.2
Average relative humidity (%)	59	48	42	36	40	46	54	58	60	53	58	63	51
Mean monthly sunshine hours	209.2	212.5	252.3	270.5	303.6	295.6	292.1	280.3	261.2	264.4	227.5	208.8	3,078
Percentage possible sunshine	69	69	67	68	68	66	65	67	71	78	77	72	70
Source: China Meteorological Administrationall-time September high

== See also ==
- List of administrative divisions of Gansu
