= Qingcheng County =

Qingcheng County 庆城县
- County
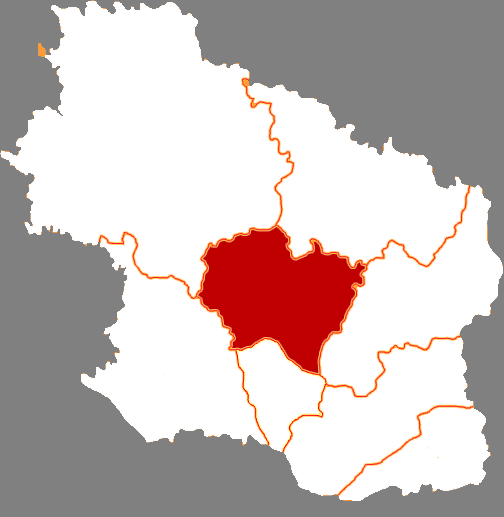
- Qingcheng in Qingyang

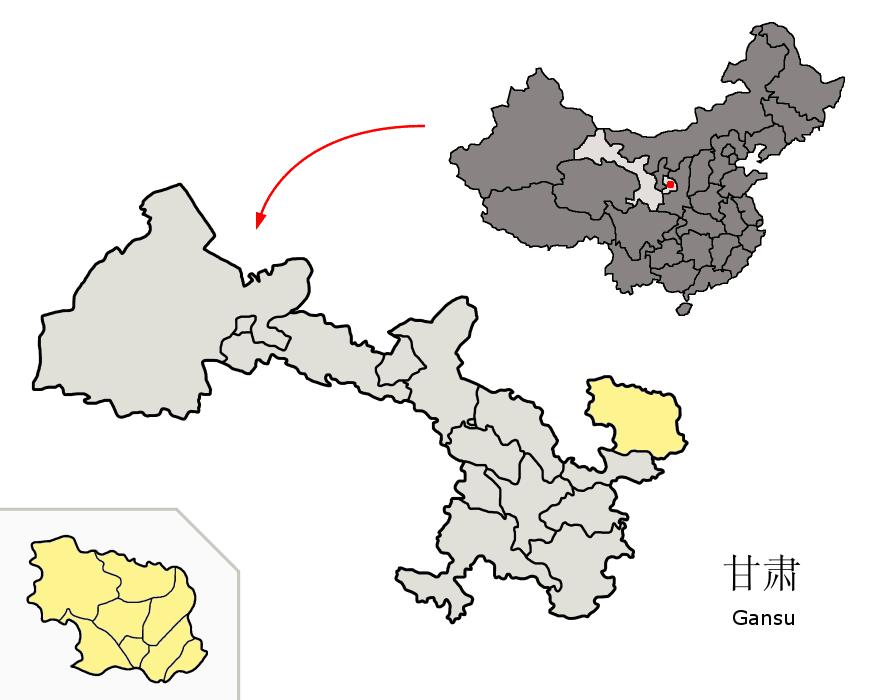
- Qingyang in Gansu
- Coordinates: 36°00′59″N 107°52′54″E
- Country: China
- Province: Gansu
- Prefecture-level city: Qingyang
- County seat: Qingcheng Town

Area
  - Total: 2,692.6 km^{2} (1,039.6 sq mi)

Population (2018)
  - Total: 289,761
  - Density: 107.61/km^{2} (278.72/sq mi)
- Time zone: UTC+8 (China Standard)
- Postal code: 745100
- Website: www.chinaqingcheng.gov.cn

Qingcheng County (simplified Chinese: 庆城县; traditional Chinese: 慶城縣; pinyin: Qìngchéng Xiàn) is a county in the east of Gansu province, China. It is under the administration of the prefecture-level city of Qingyang.

== History ==
The history of Qingcheng dates back to prehistoric settlements 200,000 years ago. And written records mention the city 4,000 years ago. During the Xia dynasty (2070 and 1600 BC), the area was part of the Yongzhou state. During the late Shang dynasty era, it became part of Yiqu state. In 266 BC it was conquered by the Qin dynasty. In 221 BC, the Qin set up the county seat of Beidi (北地郡) in present-day Maling town, ruling over what was then named Yiqu County, where the present day county seat is located. In 220 AD, Qiang and Rong barbarians captured the county. During the Three Kingdoms the Xubu occupied Qingcheng. In 265 it became part of the Western Jin Dynasty.

== Administrative divisions ==
Qingcheng County is divided to 9 towns and 6 townships.

Towns

- Qingcheng (庆城镇)
- Yima (驿马镇)
- Sanshilipu (三十里铺镇)
- Maling (马岭镇)
- Xuanma (玄马镇)
- Baimapu (白马铺镇)
- Tongchuan (桐川镇)
- Chicheng (赤城镇)
- Gaolou (高楼镇)

Townships

- Taibailiang Township (太白梁乡)
- Tuqiao Township (土桥乡)
- Caikouji Township (蔡口集乡)
- Nanzhuang Township (南庄乡)
- Zhaijiahe Township (翟家河乡)
- Caijiamiao Township (蔡家庙乡)

== Climate ==
Climate data for Qingcheng, elevation 1,094 m (3,589 ft), (1991–2020 normals, extremes 1981–2010)
Month	Jan	Feb	Mar	Apr	May	Jun	Jul	Aug	Sep	Oct	Nov	Dec	Year
Record high °C (°F)	14.6 (58.3)	21.6 (70.9)	29.0 (84.2)	34.0 (93.2)	35.5 (95.9)	38.1 (100.6)	38.1 (100.6)	35.3 (95.5)	36.2 (97.2)	28.9 (84.0)	22.8 (73.0)	16.6 (61.9)	38.1 (100.6)
Mean daily maximum °C (°F)	2.5 (36.5)	6.7 (44.1)	13.1 (55.6)	20.0 (68.0)	24.5 (76.1)	28.5 (83.3)	29.6 (85.3)	27.6 (81.7)	22.5 (72.5)	16.5 (61.7)	10.1 (50.2)	3.9 (39.0)	17.1 (62.8)
Daily mean °C (°F)	−4.9 (23.2)	−0.6 (30.9)	5.6 (42.1)	12.3 (54.1)	17.1 (62.8)	21.3 (70.3)	23.2 (73.8)	21.5 (70.7)	16.4 (61.5)	9.8 (49.6)	2.9 (37.2)	−3.3 (26.1)	10.1 (50.2)
Mean daily minimum °C (°F)	−10.1 (13.8)	−6.0 (21.2)	−0.3 (31.5)	5.6 (42.1)	10.1 (50.2)	14.8 (58.6)	17.9 (64.2)	17.0 (62.6)	12.1 (53.8)	5.2 (41.4)	−2.0 (28.4)	−8.3 (17.1)	4.7 (40.4)
Record low °C (°F)	−20.5 (−4.9)	−18.0 (−0.4)	−14.2 (6.4)	−5.5 (22.1)	−0.6 (30.9)	6.6 (43.9)	11.7 (53.1)	7.3 (45.1)	2.2 (36.0)	−8.4 (16.9)	−14.8 (5.4)	−25.4 (−13.7)	−25.4 (−13.7)
Average precipitation mm (inches)	4.3 (0.17)	6.6 (0.26)	14.1 (0.56)	29.4 (1.16)	41.6 (1.64)	61.1 (2.41)	111.5 (4.39)	112.4 (4.43)	73.6 (2.90)	39.4 (1.55)	12.9 (0.51)	2.8 (0.11)	509.7 (20.09)
Average precipitation days (≥ 0.1 mm)	3.5	4.1	5.4	6.4	8.2	9.7	12.1	12.1	11.0	8.7	4.5	1.9	87.6
Average snowy days	4.7	4.8	3.2	0.5	0	0	0	0	0	0.4	2.6	3.4	19.6
Average relative humidity (%)	59	57	54	52	55	60	70	75	78	76	69	62	64
Mean monthly sunshine hours	194.0	180.3	213.0	236.6	260.2	249.5	244.7	219.1	170.2	171.8	179.3	196.8	2,515.5
Percentage possible sunshine	62	58	57	60	60	57	56	53	46	50	59	65	57
Source: China Meteorological Administration

== See also ==
- List of administrative divisions of Gansu
