= Longdong University =

University in Qingyang, China

Coordinates: 35.7362°N 107.6675°E

Longdong University (Chinese: 陇东学院; lit. 'Eastern Gansu College') is a college in Qingyang, a Chinese city in eastern Gansu.
