= Gansu =

Province in Northwestern China

Gansu 甘肃 Kansu
- Province
- Province of Gansu
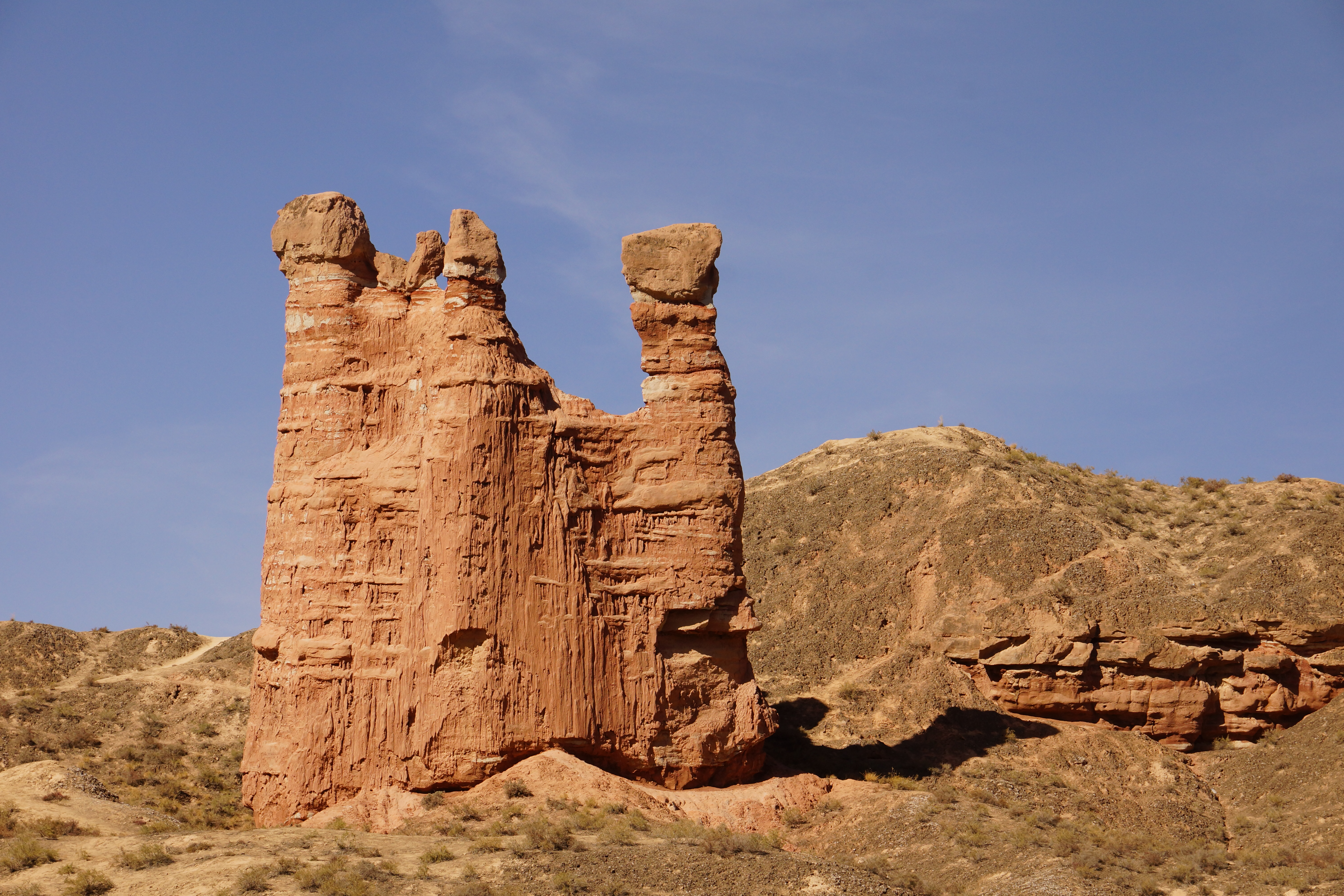
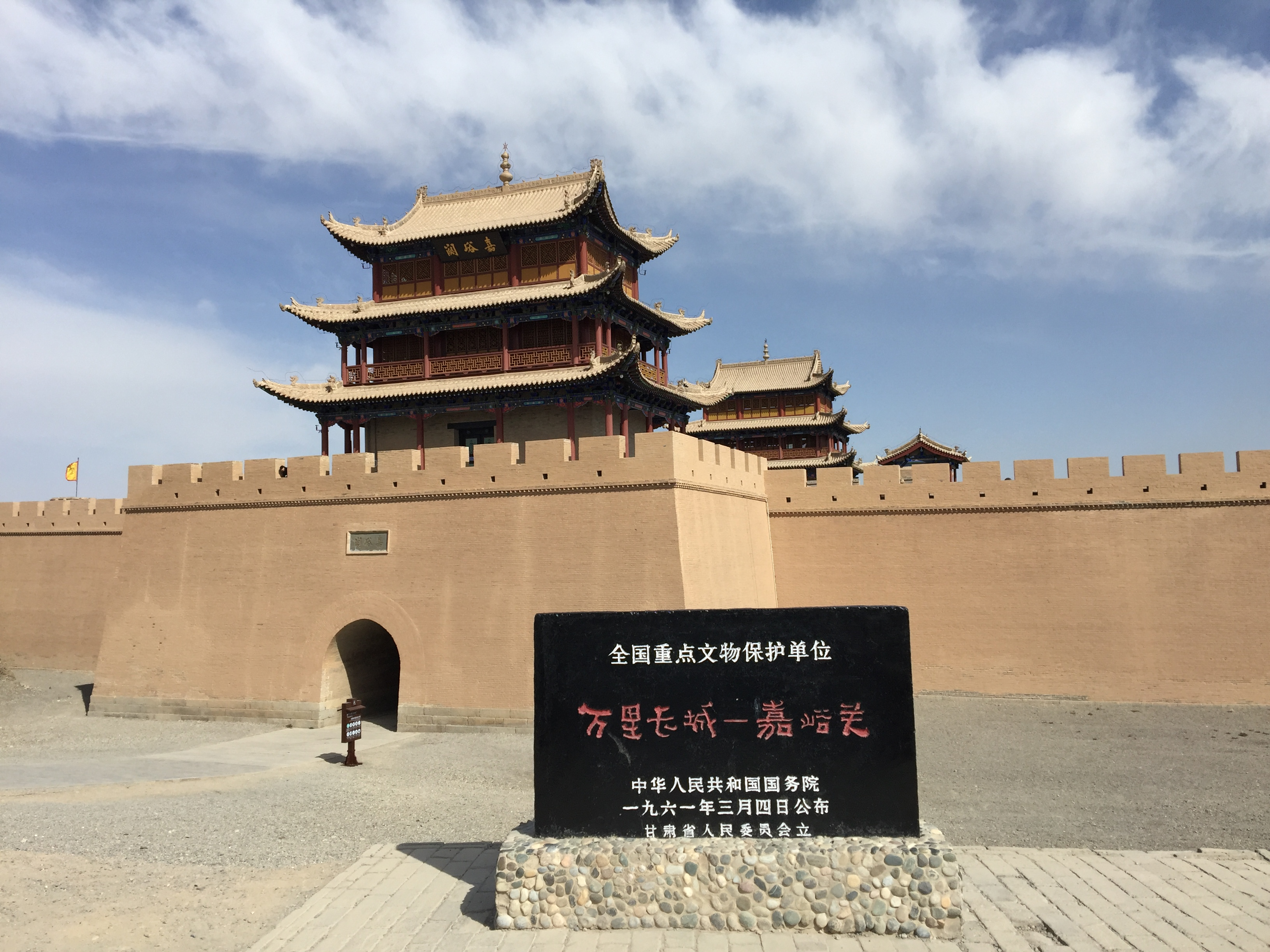
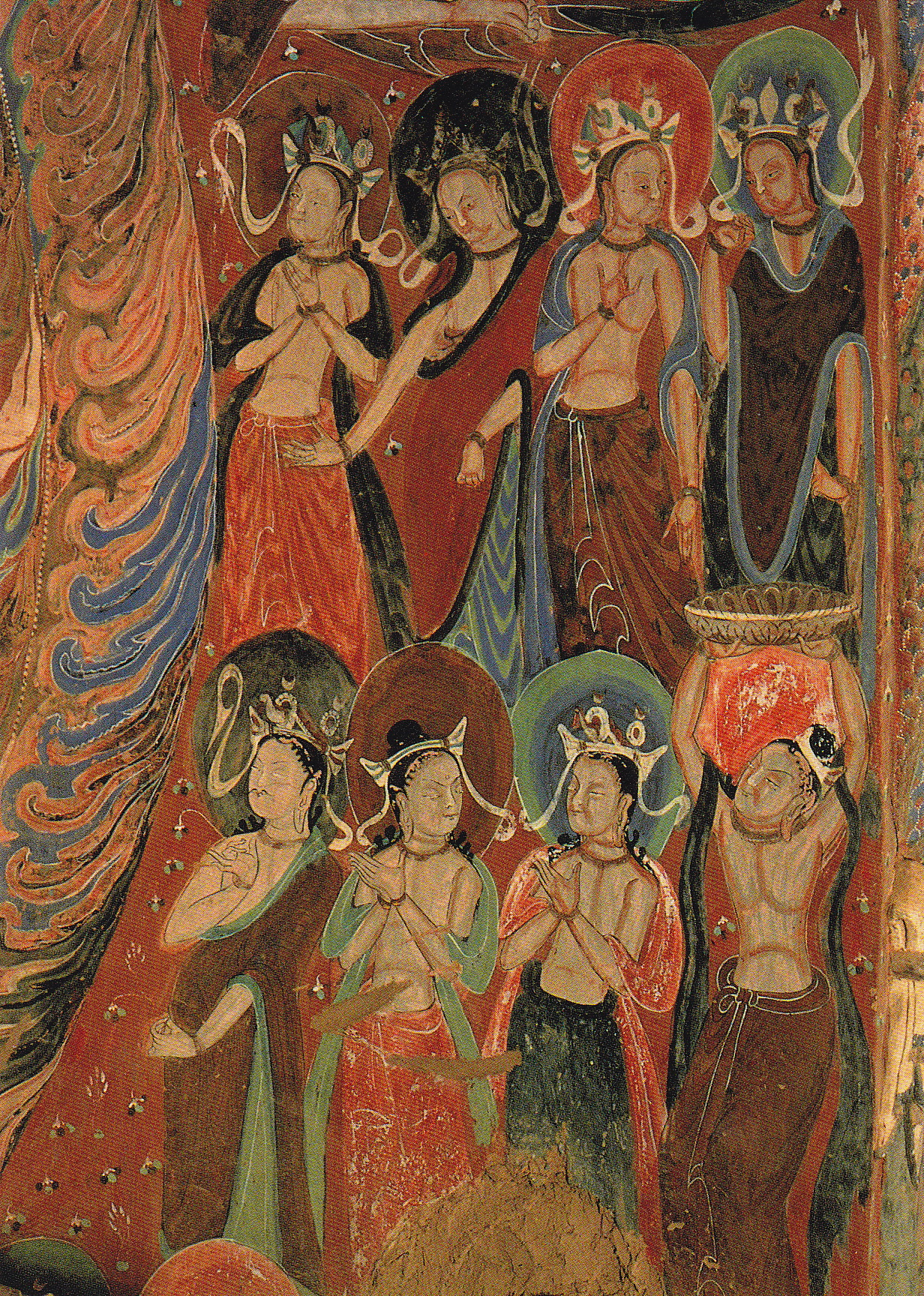
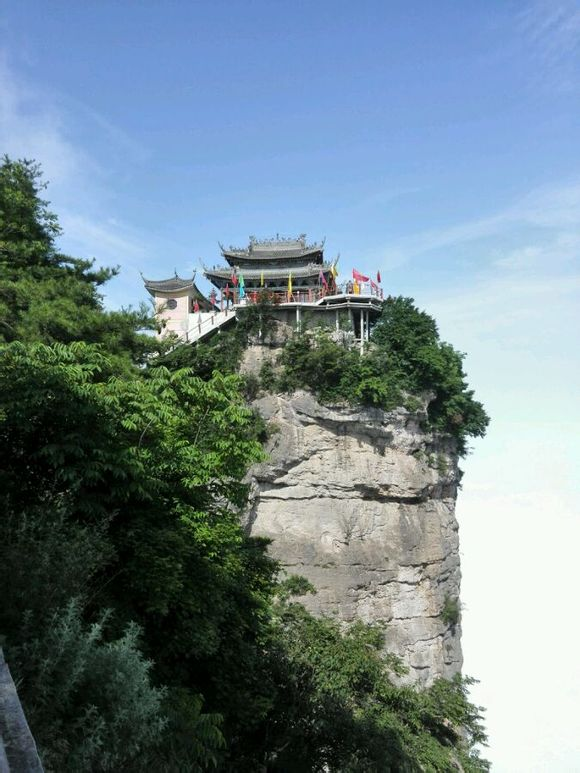
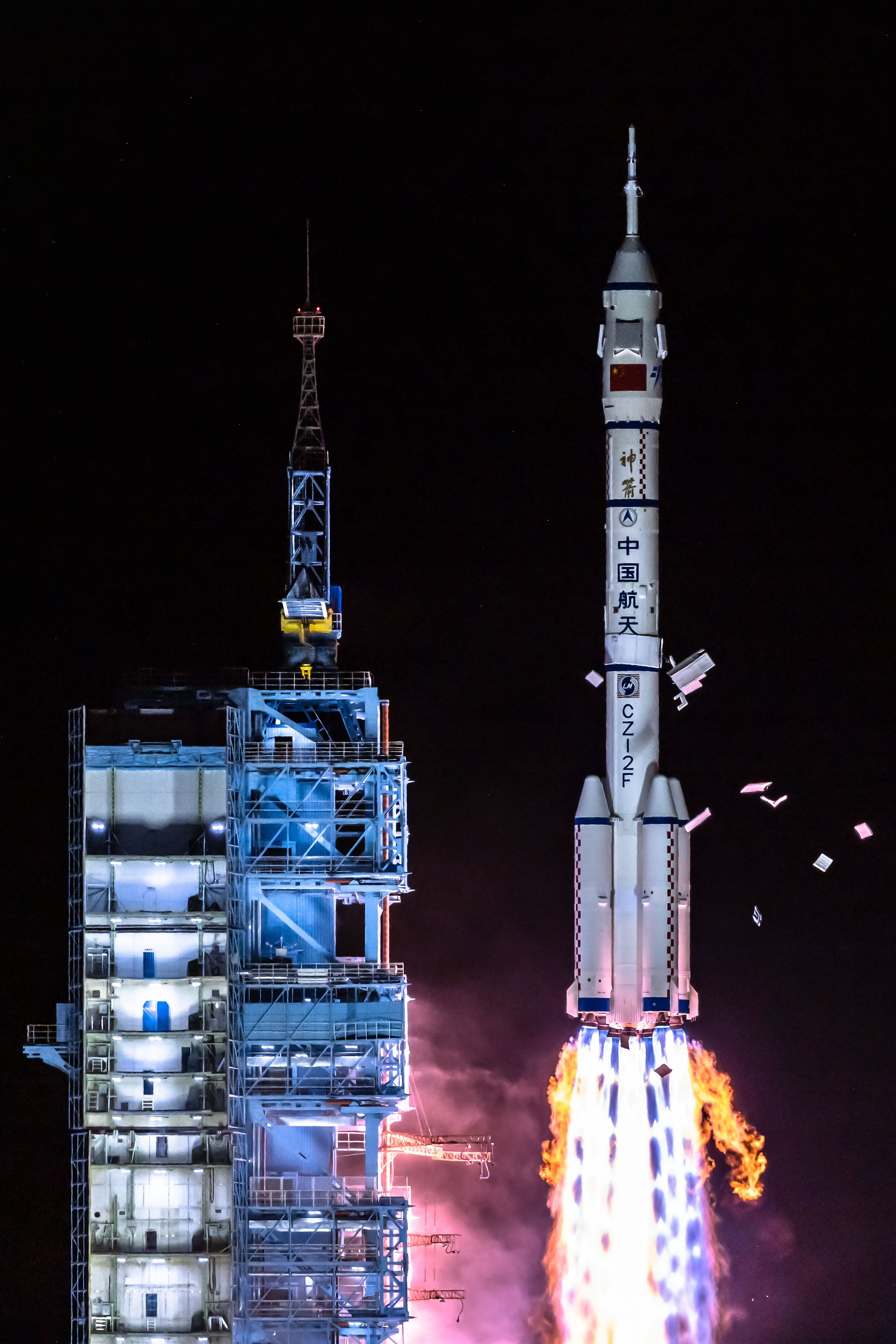
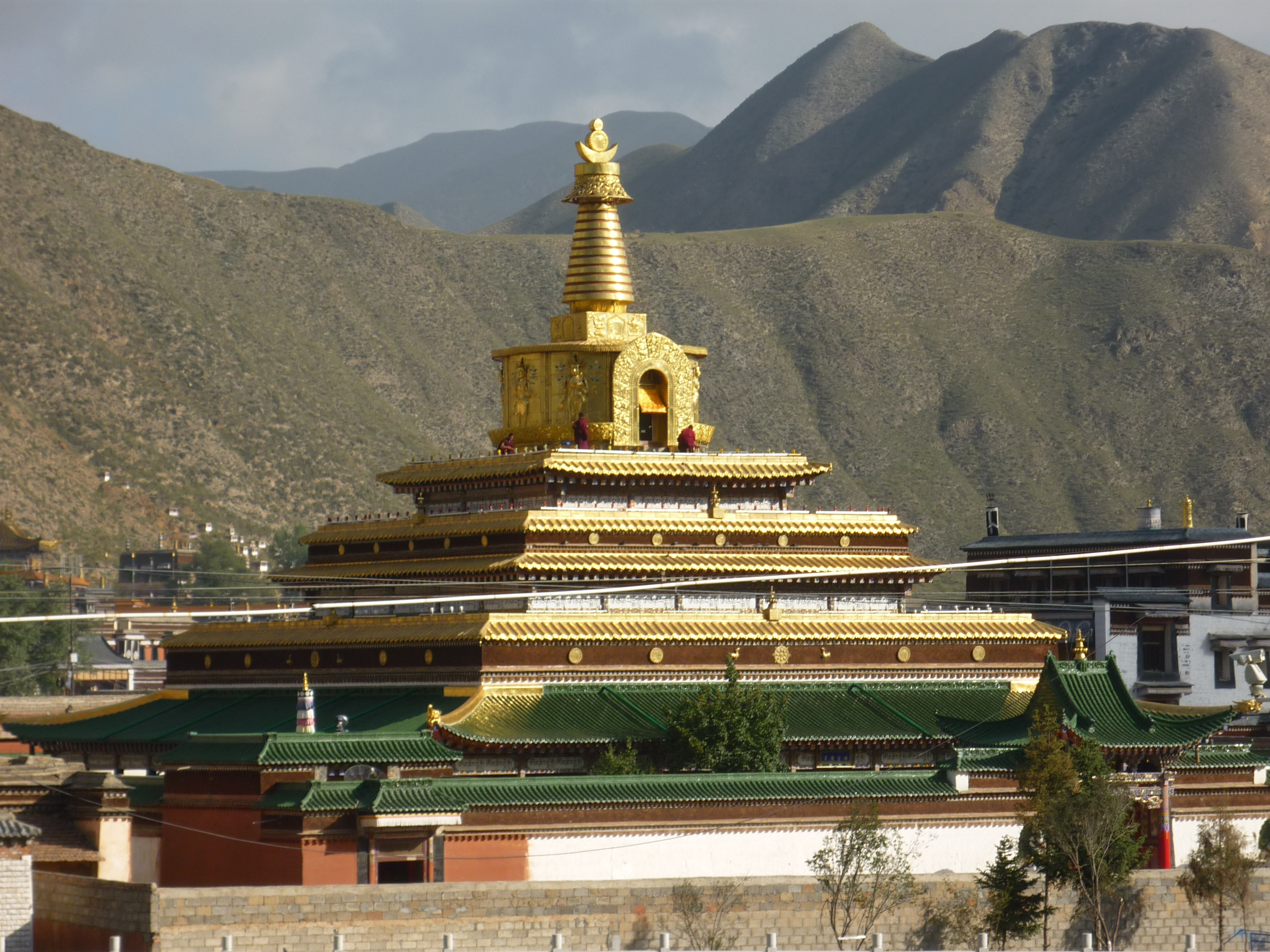
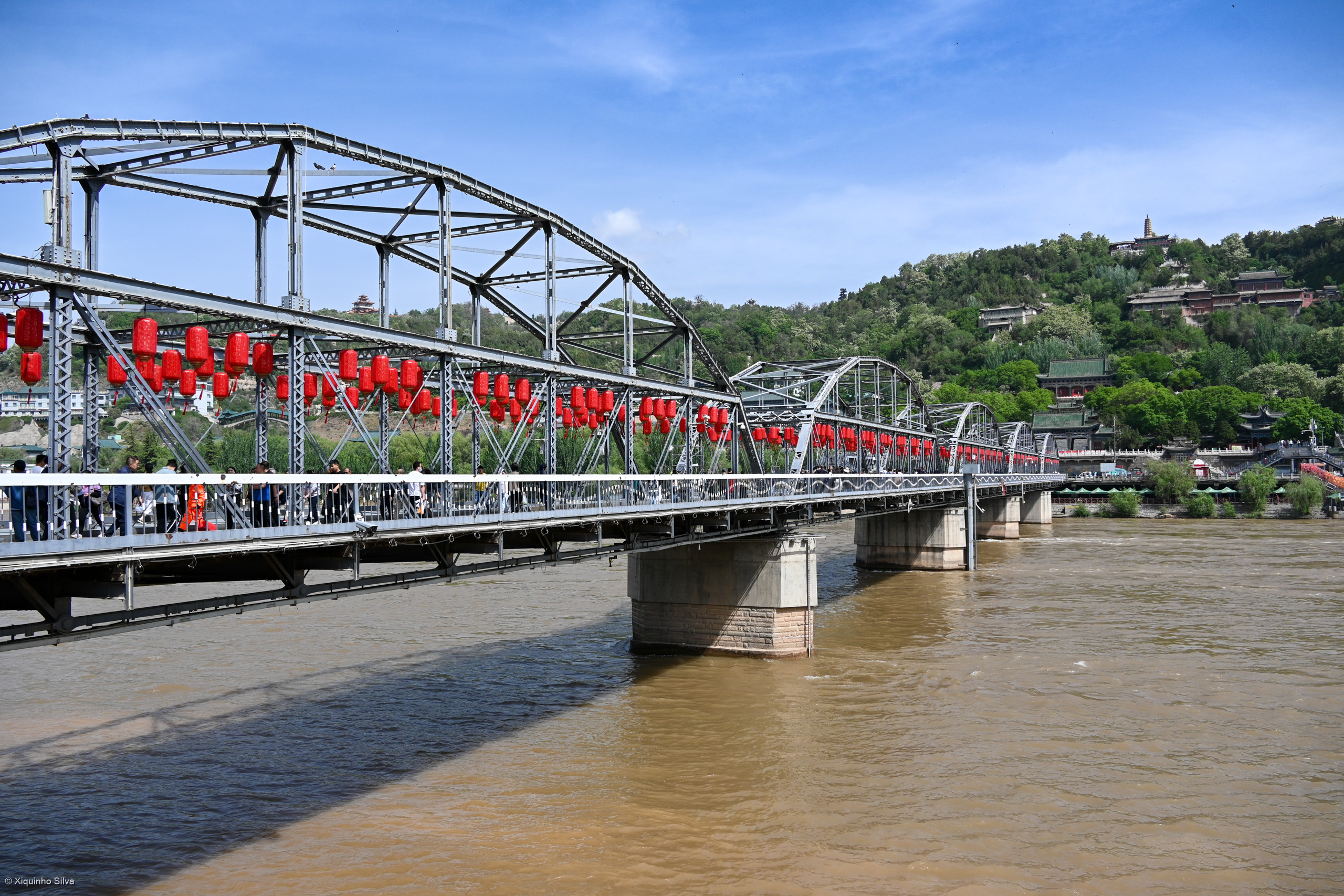
- Zhangye National Geopark Great Wall at Jiayu Pass Mogao Caves Longnan Jiuquan Satellite Launch Center Labrang Monastery Zhongshan Bridge, Lanzhou

- Coordinates: 38°N 102°E
- Country: China
- Named for: 甘 gān: Ganzhou; 肃 sù: Suzhou
- Capital (and largest city): Lanzhou
- Divisions: 14 prefectures, 86 counties, 1344 townships

Government
  - Type: Province
  - Body: Gansu Provincial People's Congress
  - Party Secretary: Wu Xiaojun
  - Congress chairman: Wu Xiaojun
  - Governor: Kong Shaoxun
  - CPPCC chairman: Zhuang Guotai
  - National People's Congress Representation: 52 deputies

Area
  - Total: 453,700 km^{2} (175,200 sq mi)
  - Rank: 7th
- Highest elevation (Altyn-Tagh): 5,830 m (19,130 ft)

Population (2020)
  - Total: 25,019,831
  - Rank: 22nd
  - Density: 55.15/km^{2} (142.8/sq mi)
  - Rank: 27th

Demographics
  - Ethnic composition: Han: 91%; Hui: 5%; Dongxiang: 2%; Tibetan: 2%
  - Languages and dialects: Central Plains Mandarin; Lanyin Mandarin; Amdo Tibetan

GDP (2025)
  - Total: CN¥1,369.75 billion (27th; US$191.76 billion)
  - Per capita: CN¥55,897 (31st; US$7,825)
- ISO 3166 code: CN-GS
- HDI (2023): 0.731 (29th) – high
- Website: www.gansu.gov.cn

Gansu
- "Gansu" in simplified (top) and traditional (bottom) Chinese characters

Chinese name
- Simplified Chinese: 甘肃
- Traditional Chinese: 甘肅
- Literal meaning: "Ganzhou and Suzhou"
Transcriptions
Standard Mandarin
- Hanyu Pinyin: Gānsù
- Bopomofo: ㄍㄢ ㄙㄨˋ
- Wade–Giles: Kan^{1}-su^{4}
- IPA: [kán.sû]
other Mandarin
- Xiao'erjing: قًاسُ
- Dungan: Гансў
Wu
- Suzhounese: Koe^{1}-soq^{7}
Yue: Cantonese
- Yale Romanization: Gām-sūk
- Jyutping: Gam1-suk1
- IPA: [kɐm˥.sʊk̚˥]
Southern Min
- Tâi-lô: Kam-siok

Tibetan name
- Tibetan: ཀན་སུའུ་ཞིང་ཆེན།
Transcriptions
- Wylie: kan su'u zhing chen
- Tibetan Pinyin: Gainsu Xingqên

Mongolian name
- Mongolian Cyrillic: Ганьсү муж
- Mongolian script: ᠭᠠᠨᠰᠤ ᠮᠤᠵᠢ
Transcriptions
- SASM/GNC: ɣansu muǰi

Uyghur name
- Uyghur: گەنسۇ ئۆلكىسى
Transcriptions
- Latin Yëziqi: Gensu ölkisi
- Siril Yëziqi: гәнсу өлкиси

Kazakh name
- Kazakh: گانسۋ ولكەسى; Ганьсу өлкесі Gansu ölkesi

Gansu (Note: UK: /ɡænˈsuː/ gan-SOO, US: /ɡɑːn-/ gahn-;) is a province in Northwestern China. Its capital and largest city is Lanzhou, in the southeastern part of the province. The seventh-largest administrative district by area at 453,700 square kilometres (175,200 sq mi), Gansu lies between the Tibetan and Loess plateaus and borders Xinjiang and Qinghai to the west, Sichuan to the south, Shaanxi to the east, and Inner Mongolia, Ningxia and Mongolia's Govi-Altai Province to the north. The Yellow River passes through the southern part of the province. Part of Gansu's territory is located in the Gobi Desert. The Qilian Mountains are located in the south of the Province.

Gansu has a population of 26 million, ranking 22nd in China. Its population is mostly Han, along with Hui, Dongxiang and Tibetan minorities. The most common language is Mandarin. Gansu is among the poorest administrative divisions in China, ranking last in GDP per capita as of 2019.

The state of Qin originated in what is now southeastern Gansu, and later established the first imperial dynasty in Chinese history. The Northern Silk Road ran through the Hexi Corridor, which passes through Gansu, resulting in it being an important strategic outpost and communications link for the Chinese empire.

The city of Jiayuguan, the second most populated city in Gansu, is known for its section of the Great Wall and the Jiayu Pass fortress complex.

== Name ==
Gansu is a compound of the names of Ganzhou (now the main urban district and seat of Zhangye) and Suzhou (an old name and the modern seat of Jiuquan), formerly the two most important Chinese settlements in the Hexi Corridor.

Gansu is abbreviated as 甘 (Gān) or 陇 (Lǒng), and was also known as Longxi (陇西; 'west of Long') or Longyou (陇右; 'right of Long') prior to early Western Han dynasty, in reference to Mount Liupan between eastern Gansu and western Shaanxi.

Until 1987, Gansu was rendered in the postal romanization and Wade-Giles as Kansu, which was gradually replaced by pinyin starting in 1958. The spelling of the province is also spelled in Mandarin Phonetic Symbols II (1986) and Tongyong Pinyin (2002) adopted by Taiwan, who would later adopt Hanyu Pinyin in 2009.

== History ==
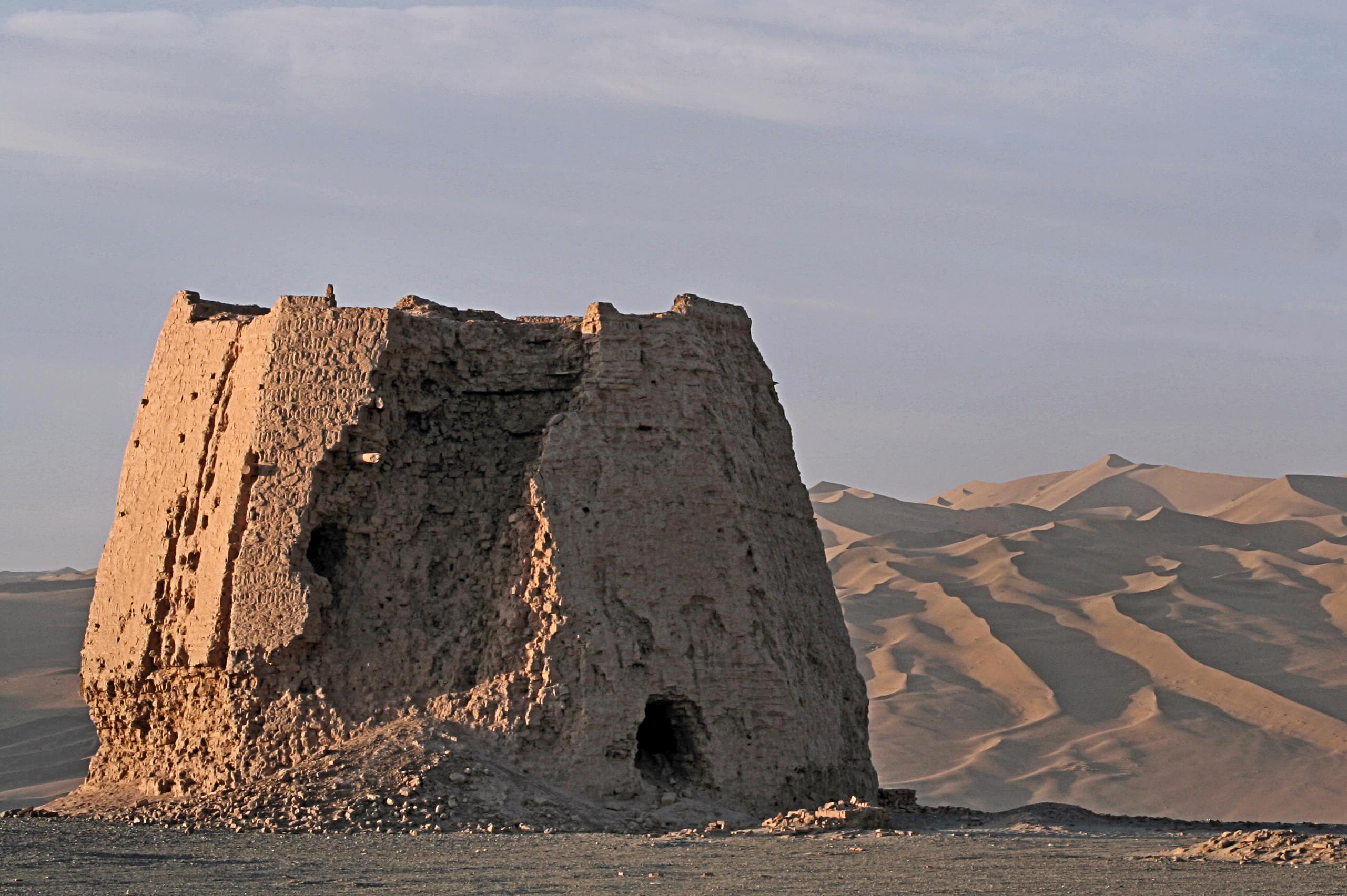
The ruins of a Han dynasty (202 BC – 220 AD) Chinese watchtower made of rammed earth at Dunhuang, Gansu province, the eastern edge of the Silk Road

Gansu's name is a compound name first used during the Song dynasty. It is a combination of the names of two prefectures (州) in the Sui and Tang dynasty: Gan (around Zhangye) and Su (around Jiuquan). Its eastern part forms part of one of the cradles of ancient Chinese civilisation.

=== Ancient Gansu ===
In prehistoric times, Gansu was host to Neolithic cultures. The Dadiwan culture, from where archaeologically significant artifacts have been excavated, flourished in the eastern end of Gansu from about 6000 BC to about 3000 BC. The Majiayao culture and part of the Qijia culture took root in Gansu from 3100 BC to 2700 BC and 2400 BC to 1900 BC respectively.

The Yuezhi originally lived in the very western part of Gansu until they were forced to emigrate by the Xiongnu around 177 BC.

The State of Qin, known in China as the founding state of the Chinese empire, grew out from the southeastern part of Gansu, specifically the Tianshui area. The Qin name is believed to have originated, in part, from the area. Qin tombs and artifacts have been excavated from Fangmatan near Tianshui, including one 2200-year-old map of Guixian County.

=== Imperial era ===
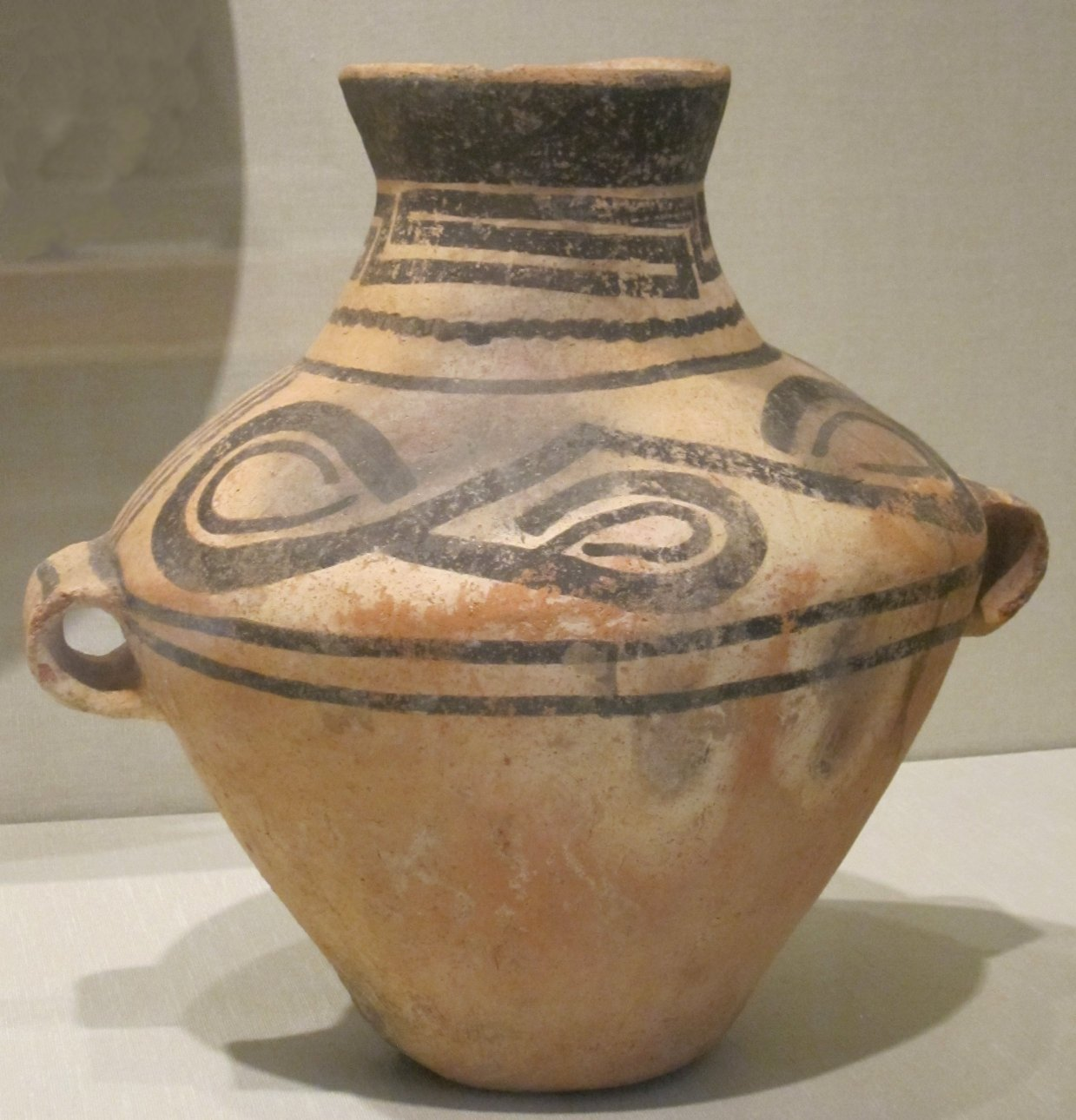
Xindian culture era jar with two lug handles uncovered in Gansu, dating to around 1,000 BC

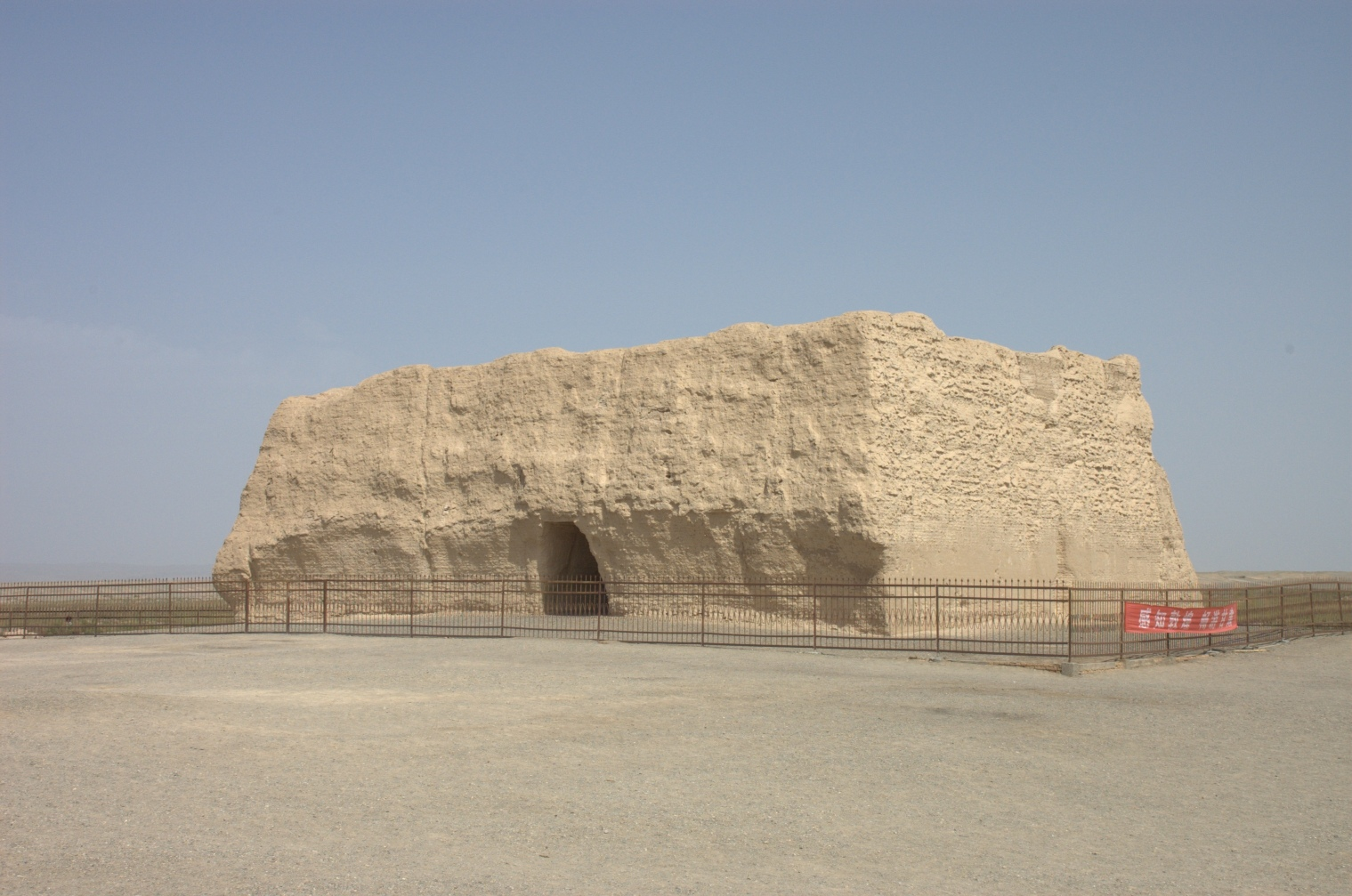
The ruins of a gate at Yumen Pass, built during the Jin dynasty (266–420)

In imperial times, Gansu was an important strategic outpost and communications link for the Chinese empire, as the Hexi Corridor runs along the "neck" of the province. The Han dynasty extended the Great Wall across this corridor, building the strategic Yumenguan (Jade Gate Pass, near Dunhuang) and Yangguan fort towns along it. Remains of the wall and the towns can be found there. The Ming dynasty built the Jiayuguan outpost in Gansu. To the west of Yumenguan and the Qilian Mountains, at the northwestern end of the province, the Yuezhi, Wusun, and other nomadic tribes dwelt (Shiji 123), occasionally figuring in regional imperial Chinese geopolitics.

By the Qingshui treaty, concluded in 823 between the Tibetan Empire and the Tang dynasty, China lost much of western Gansu province for a significant period.

After the fall of the Uyghur Khaganate, a Buddhist Yugur (Uyghur) state called the Ganzhou Uyghur Kingdom was established by migrating Uyghurs from the khaganate in part of Gansu that lasted from 848 to 1036 AD.

Along the Silk Road, Gansu was an economically important province, as well as a cultural transmission path. Temples and Buddhist grottoes such as those at Mogao Caves ('Caves of the Thousand Buddhas') and Maijishan Caves contain artistically and historically revealing murals. An early form of paper inscribed with Chinese characters and dating to about 8 BC was discovered at the site of a Western Han garrison near the Yumen pass in August 2006.

The Xixia or Western Xia dynasty controlled much of Gansu as well as Ningxia.

The province was also the origin of the Dungan Revolt of 1862–77. Among the Qing forces were Muslim generals, including Ma Zhan'ao and Ma Anliang, who helped the Qing crush the rebel Muslims. The revolt had spread into Gansu from neighbouring Qinghai.

There was another Dungan revolt from 1895 to 1896.

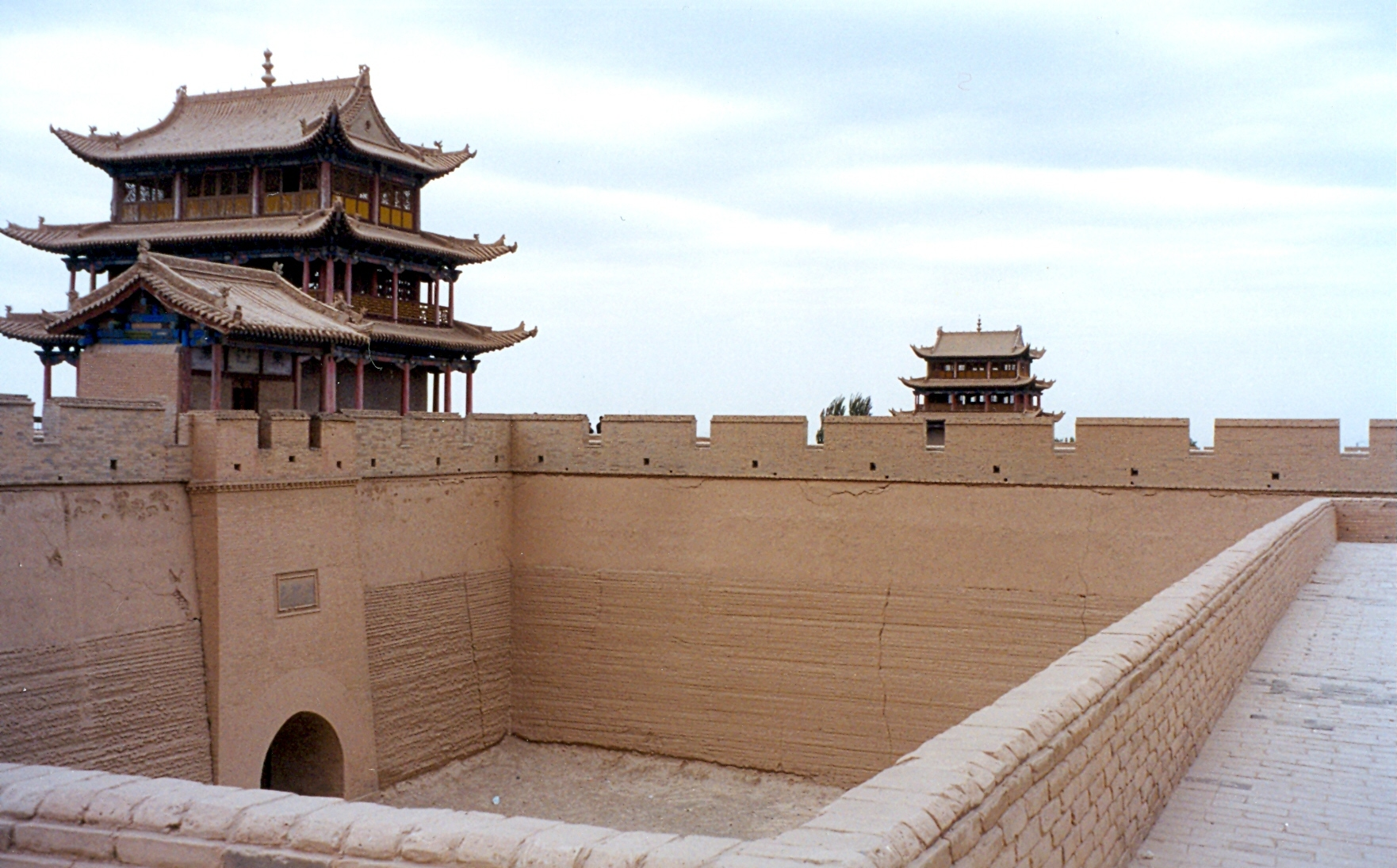
Jiayuguan Fort

=== Republican China ===
As a result of frequent earthquakes, droughts and famines, the economic progress of Gansu was significantly slower than that of other provinces of China until recently. Based on the area's abundant mineral resources it has begun developing into a vital industrial center. An earthquake in Gansu at 8.6 on the Richter scale killed around 180,000 people mostly in the present-day area of Ningxia in 1920, and another with a magnitude of 7.6 killed 275 in 1932.

The Muslim Conflict in Gansu (1927–1930) was a conflict against the Guominjun.

While the Muslim General Ma Hongbin was acting chairman of the province, Muslim General Ma Buqing was in virtual control of Gansu in 1940. Liangzhou District in Wuwei was previously his headquarters in Gansu, where he controlled 15 million Muslims. Xinjiang came under Kuomintang (Nationalist) control after their soldiers entered via Gansu. Gansu's Tienshui was the site of a Japanese-Chinese warplane fight.

Gansu was vulnerable to Soviet penetration via Xinjiang. Gansu was a passageway for Soviet war supplies for the Republic of China during the Second Sino-Japanese War. Lanzhou was a destination point via a road coming from Dihua (Ürümqi). The Gonxingdun Aerodrome was one of several air bases where the Chinese Air Force operated in defense of Gansu. Gansu provided wartime China with most of the locally sourced petrol from the Yumen Laojunmiao oil wells beginning in the summer of 1939, producing 250,000 tons of crude oil in those war years. Lanzhou and Lhasa were designated to be recipients of a new railway.

The Kuomintang Islamic insurgency in China (1950–1958) was a prolongation of the Chinese Civil War in several provinces including Gansu.

== Geography ==
Gansu has an area of 454,000 square kilometres (175,000 sq mi), and the vast majority of its land is more than 1,000 metres (3,300 ft) above sea level. It lies between the Tibetan Plateau and the Loess Plateau, bordering Mongolia (Govi-Altai Province) to the northwest, Inner Mongolia and Ningxia to the north, Shaanxi to the east, Sichuan to the south, and Xinjiang to the west. The Yellow River passes through the southern part of the province. The province contains the geographical centre of China, marked by the Center of the Country Monument at 35°50′40.9″N 103°27′7.5″E.

Part of the Gobi Desert is located in Gansu, as well as small parts of the Badain Jaran Desert and the Tengger Desert.

The Yellow River gets most of its water from Gansu, flowing straight through Lanzhou. The area around Wuwei is part of Shiyang River Basin.

The landscape in Gansu is very mountainous in the south and flat in the north. The mountains in the south are part of the Qilian Mountains, while the far western Altyn-Tagh contains the province's highest point, at 5,830 metres (19,130 ft).

A natural land passage known as Hexi Corridor, stretching some 1,000 kilometres (620 mi) from Lanzhou to the Jade Gate, is situated within the province. It is bounded by the Gobi Desert to the north and the Qilian Mountains from the south.

Köppen–Geiger climate classification map of Gansu

Gansu generally has a semi-arid to arid continental climate (Köppen BSk or BWk) with warm to hot summers and cold to very cold winters, although diurnal temperature ranges are often so large that maxima remain above 0 °C (32 °F) even in winter. However, due to extreme altitude, some areas of Gansu exhibit a subarctic climate (Dwc) – with winter temperatures sometimes dropping to −40 °C (−40 °F). Most of the limited precipitation is delivered in the summer months. Winters are so dry that snow cover is confined to very high altitudes and the snow line can be as high as 5,500 metres (18,040 ft) in the southwest.

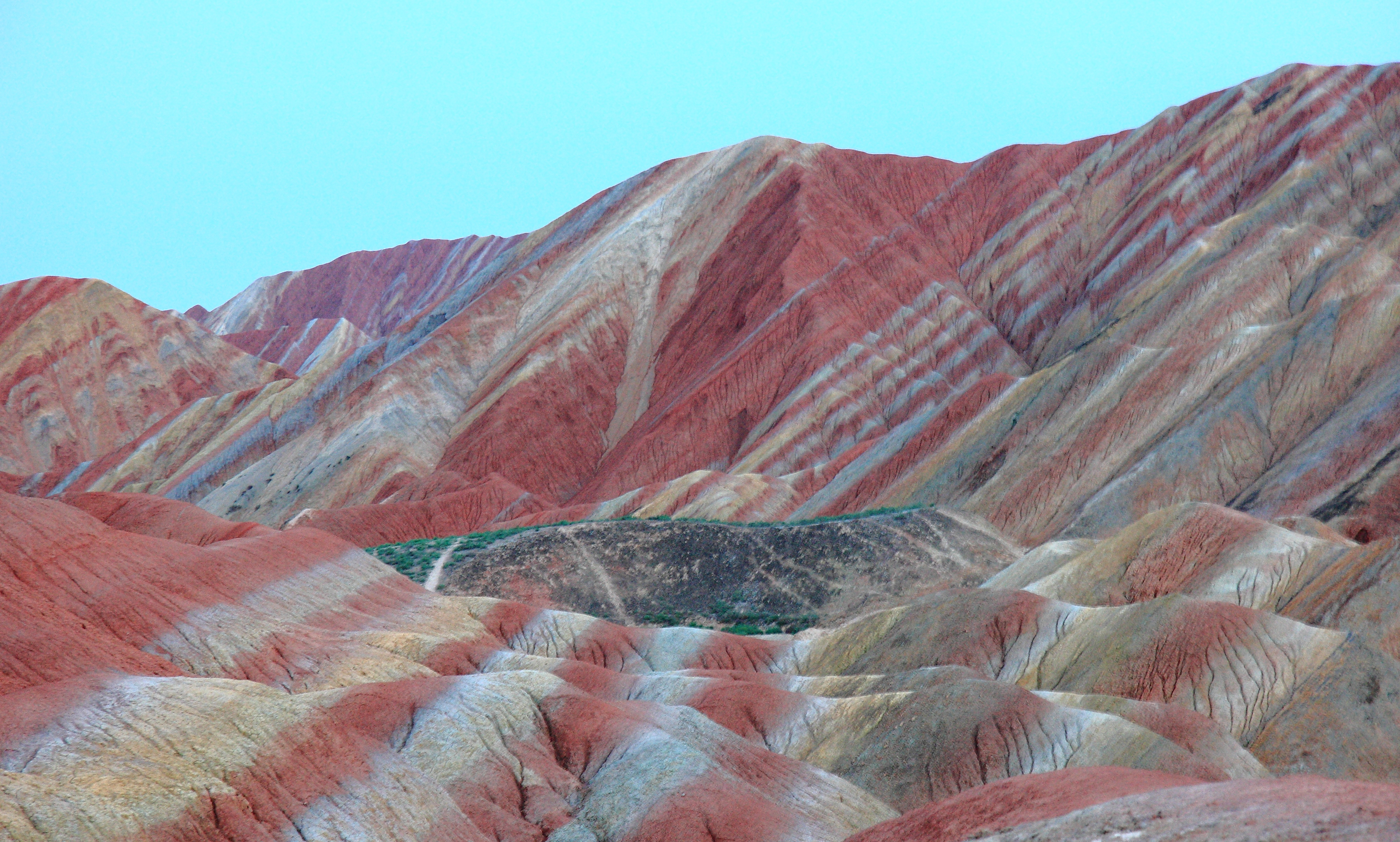
Danxia landform, Zhangye

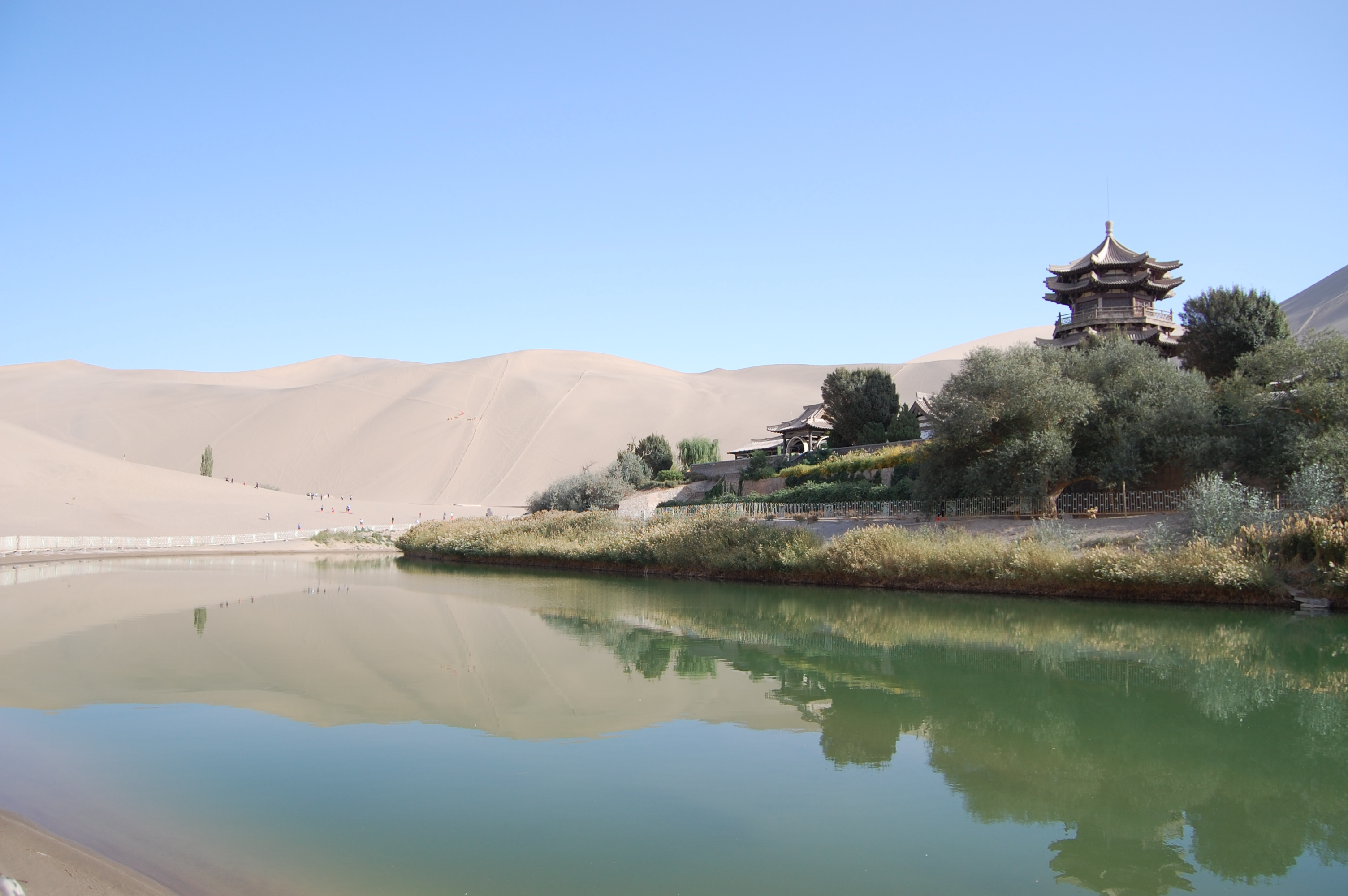
Crescent Lake, Dunhuang

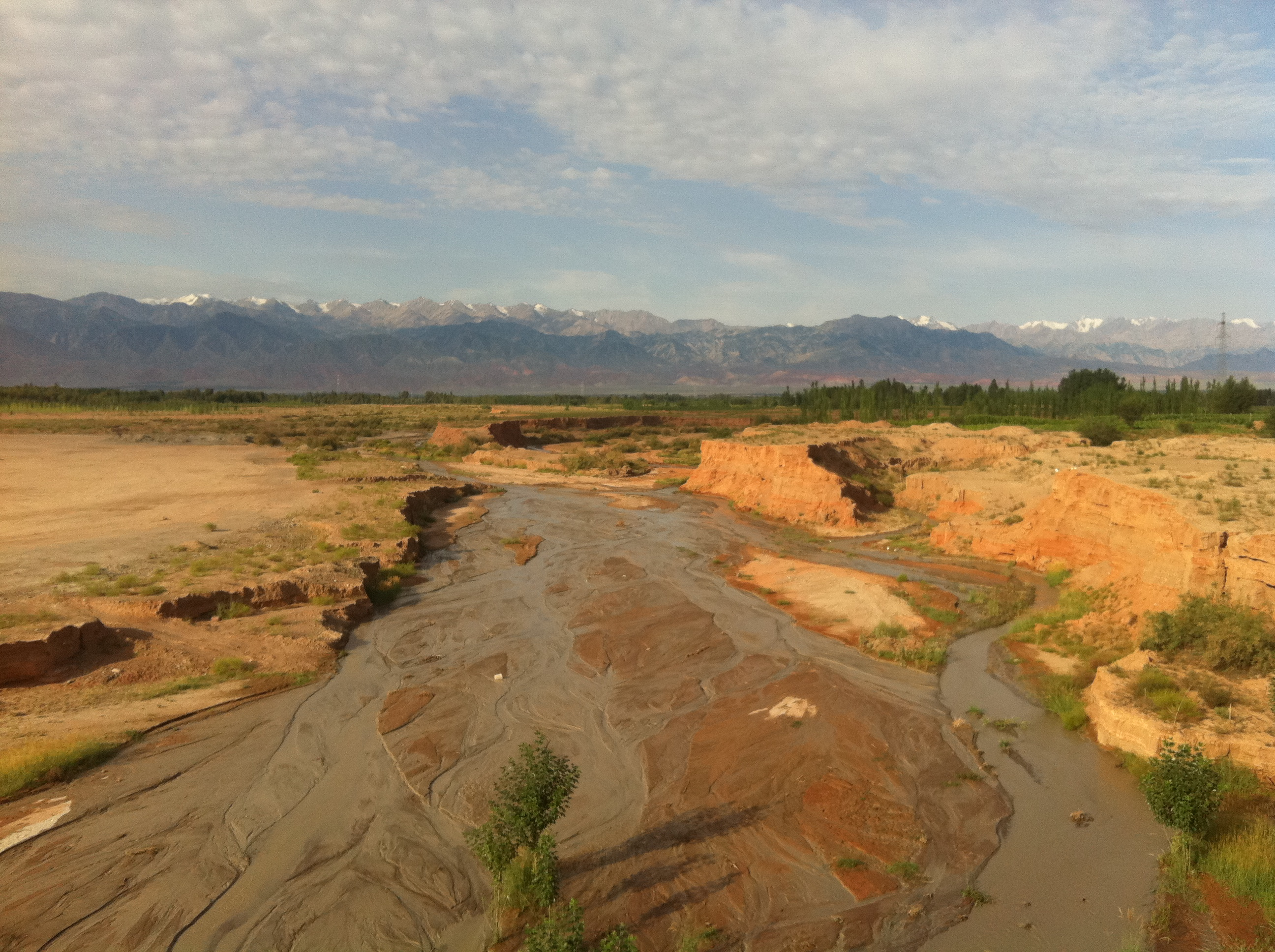
Qilian Mountains southeast of Jiuquan

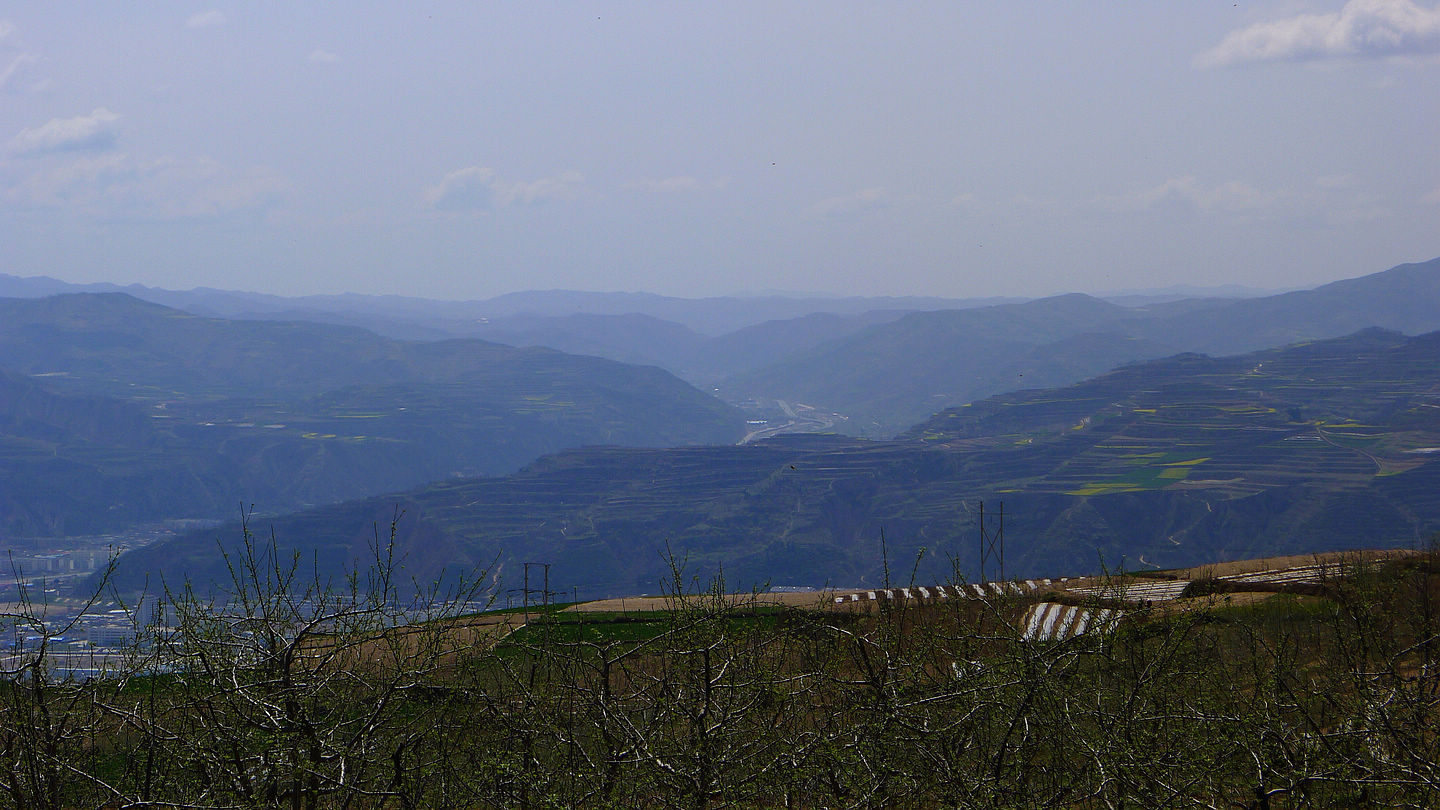
Terrace farms near Tianshui

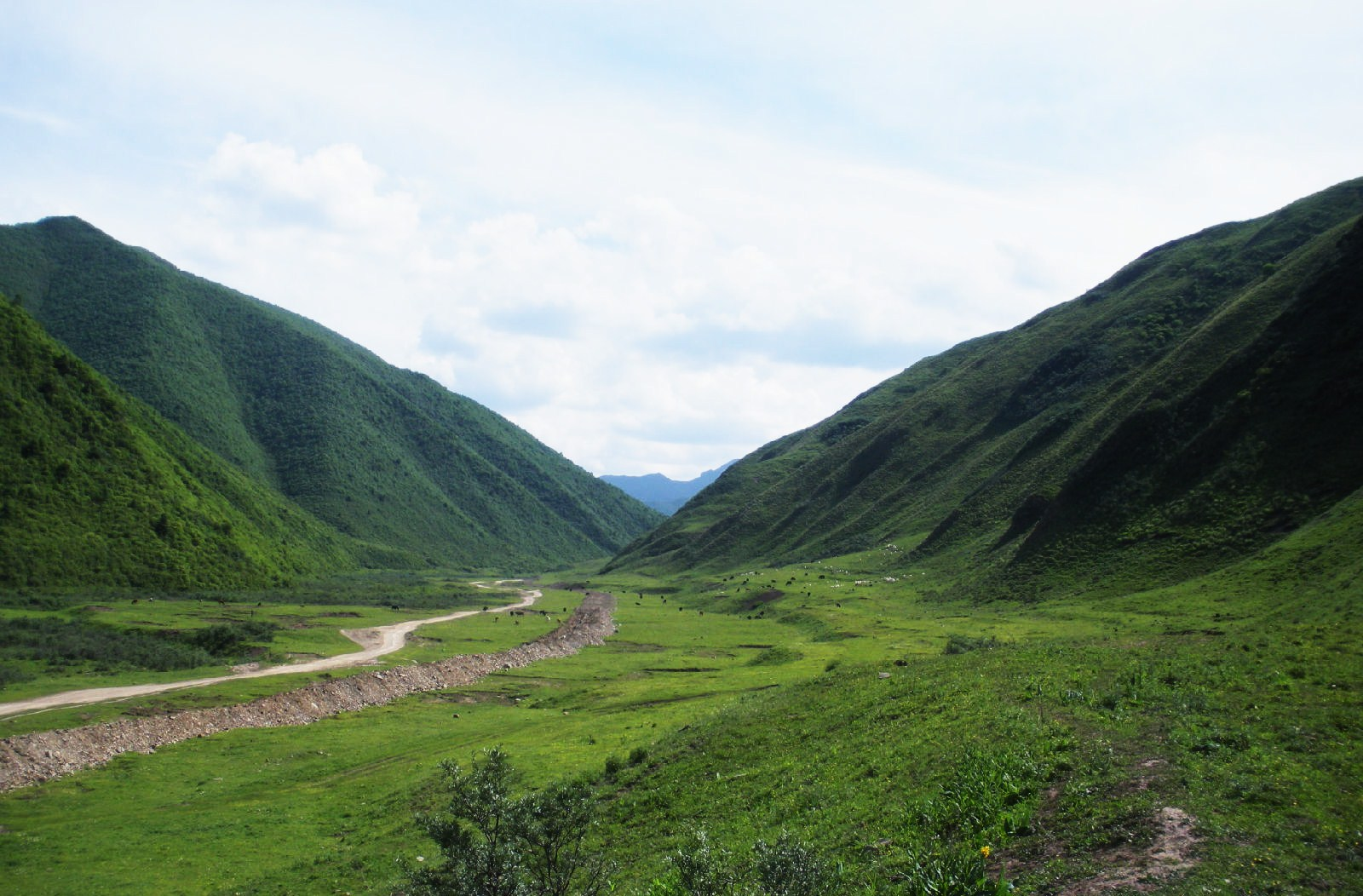
Grasslands in Min County

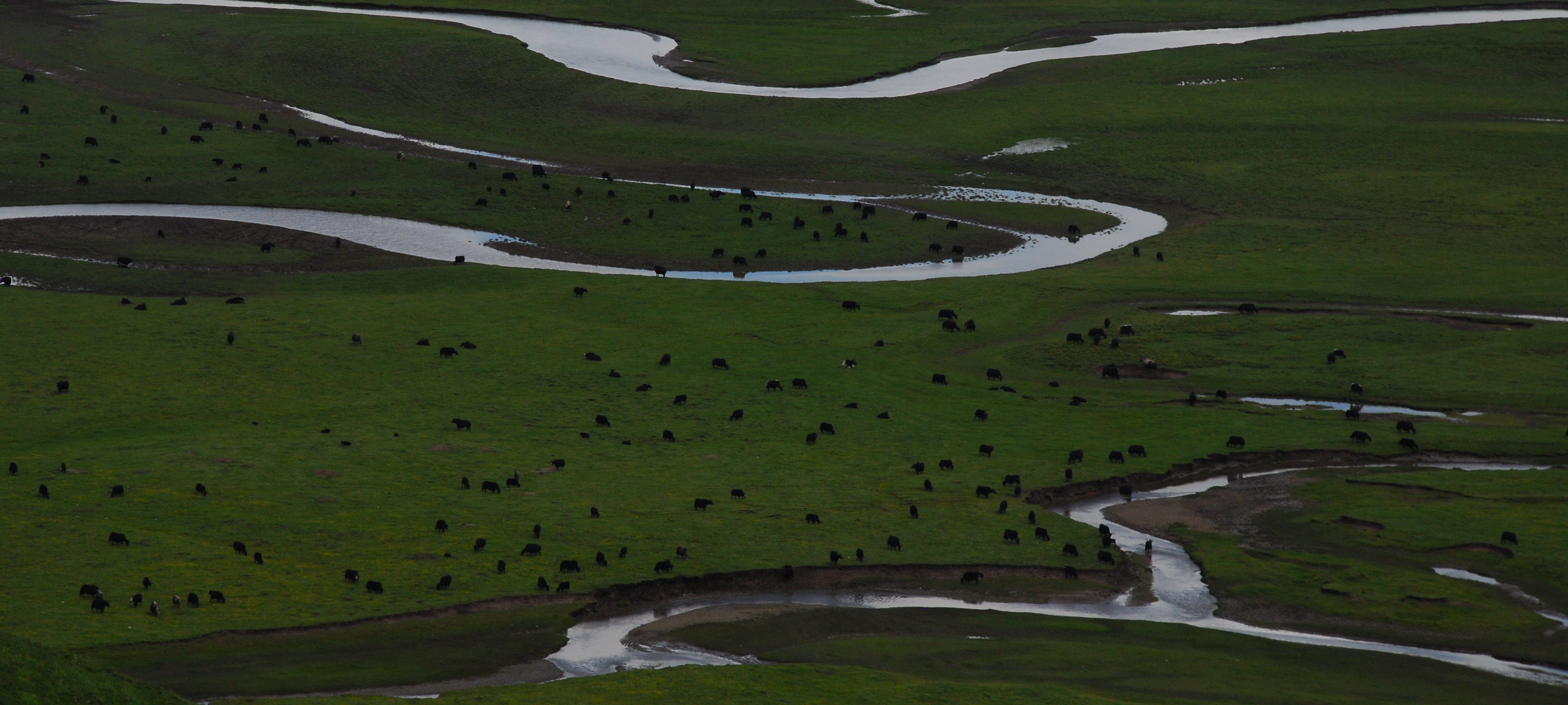
Wetland by the Yellow River, Maqu County

== Administrative divisions ==
Gansu is divided into 14 prefecture-level divisions: 12 prefecture-level cities and two autonomous prefectures:

Administrative divisions of Gansu
Division code	Division	Area in km^{2}	Population 2020	Seat	Divisions			
Division code	Division	Area in km^{2}	Population 2020	Seat	Districts	Counties	Aut. counties	CL cities
620000	Gansu Province	425,800.00	25,019,831	Lanzhou city	17	57	7	5
620100	Lanzhou city	13,103.04	4,359,446	Chengguan District	5	3		
620200	Jiayuguan city*	2,935.00	312,663	Shengli Subdistrict				
620300	Jinchang city	7,568.84	438,026	Jinchuan District	1	1		
620400	Baiyin city	20,164.09	1,512,110	Baiyin District	2	3		
620500	Tianshui city	14,312.13	2,984,659	Qinzhou District	2	4	1	
620600	Wuwei city	32,516.91	1,464,955	Liangzhou District	1	2	1	
620700	Zhangye city	39,436.54	1,131,016	Ganzhou District	1	4	1	
620800	Pingliang city	11,196.71	1,848,607	Kongtong District	1	5		1
620900	Jiuquan city	193,973.78	1,055,706	Suzhou District	1	2	2	2
621000	Qingyang city	27,219.71	2,179,716	Xifeng District	1	7		
621100	Dingxi city	19,646.14	2,524,097	Anding District	1	6		
621200	Longnan city	27,856.69	2,407,272	Wudu District	1	8		
622900	Linxia Hui Autonomous Prefecture	8,116.57	2,109,750	Linxia city		5	2	1
623000	Gannan Tibetan Autonomous Prefecture	38,311.56	691,808	Hezuo city		7		1
* – direct-piped cities – does not contain any county-level divisions

Administrative divisions in Chinese and varieties of romanizations
English	Chinese	Pinyin
Gansu Province	甘肃省	Gānsù Shěng
Lanzhou city	兰州市	Lánzhōu Shì
Jiayuguan city	嘉峪关市	Jiāyùguān Shì
Jinchang city	金昌市	Jīnchāng Shì
Baiyin city	白银市	Báiyín Shì
Tianshui city	天水市	Tiānshuǐ Shì
Wuwei city	武威市	Wǔwēi Shì
Zhangye city	张掖市	Zhāngyè Shì
Pingliang city	平凉市	Píngliáng Shì
Jiuquan city	酒泉市	Jiǔquán Shì
Qingyang city	庆阳市	Qìngyáng Shì
Dingxi city	定西市	Dìngxī Shì
Longnan city	陇南市	Lǒngnán Shì
Linxia Hui Autonomous Prefecture	临夏回族自治州	Línxià Huízú Zìzhìzhōu
Gannan Tibetan Autonomous Prefecture	甘南藏族自治州	Gānnán Zàngzú Zìzhìzhōu

The 14 Prefecture of Gansu are subdivided into 86 county-level divisions (17 districts, 5 county-level cities, 57 counties, and 7 autonomous counties).

Population by urban areas of prefecture & county cities
#	Cities	2020 Urban area	2010 Urban area	2020 City proper
1	Lanzhou (Note: Lanzhou New Area is a satellite urban area separated from Lanzhou and it is not included in the urban area count.)	3,012,577	2,438,595	4,359,446
2	Tianshui	752,900	544,441	2,984,659
3	Wuwei	467,726	331,370	1,464,955
4	Baiyin	454,323	362,363	1,512,110
5	Pingliang	332,399	248,421	1,848,607
6	Jiuquan	327,492	255,739	1,055,706
7	Qingyang	318,298	181,780	2,179,716
8	Linxia	315,082	220,895	part of Linxia Prefecture
9	Jiayuguan	295,257	216,362	312,663
10	Zhangye	278,092	216,760	1,131,016
11	Longnan	243,502	136,468	2,407,272
12	Jinchang	237,927	195,409	438,026
13	Dingxi	222,386	158,062	2,524,097
14	Lanzhou New Area	167,044	(Note: Lanzhou New Area was established after 2010 census.)	see Lanzhou
15	Dunhuang	129,853	111,535	see Jiuquan
16	Huating	110,695	(Note: Huating County is currently known as Huating CLC after 2010 census.)	see Pingliang
17	Yumen	87,544	78,940	see Jiuquan
18	Hezuo	75,650	57,384	see Gannan Prefecture

== Politics ==
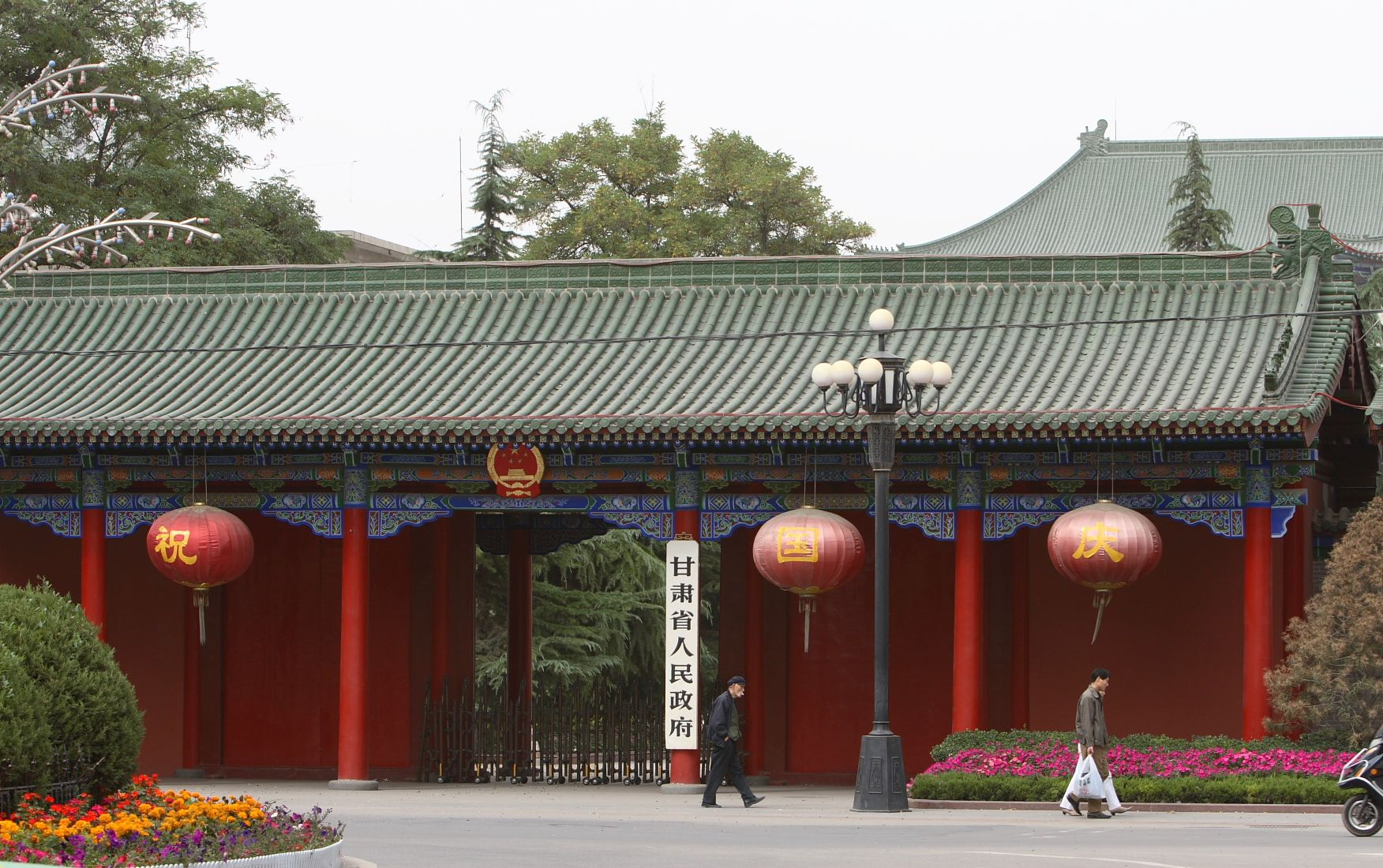
Gates of the provincial government complex in Lanzhou

The Secretary of the CCP Gansu Committee is the highest-ranking office within Gansu Province. The Governor of Gansu is the second highest-ranking official within Gansu, behind the Secretary of the CPC Gansu Committee. The governor is responsible for all issues related to economics, personnel, political initiatives, the environment and the foreign affairs of the province. The Governor is appointed by the Gansu Provincial People's Congress, which is the province's legislative body.

== Economy ==
Despite recent growth in Gansu and the booming economy in the rest of China, Gansu is still considered to be one of the poorest provinces in China. For several years, it has ranked as one of the provinces with lowest GDP per capita. Its nominal GDP for 2017 was about 767.7 billion yuan (US$113.70 billion) and per capita of 29,326 RMB (US$4,343). The province also has a large difference in wealth between regions and urban versus rural areas. The poorest areas are Dingxi, Longnan, Gannan and Linxia. According to analysts, the local economy failed to gather momentum while other provinces did manage to increase their economic growth.

=== Agriculture ===
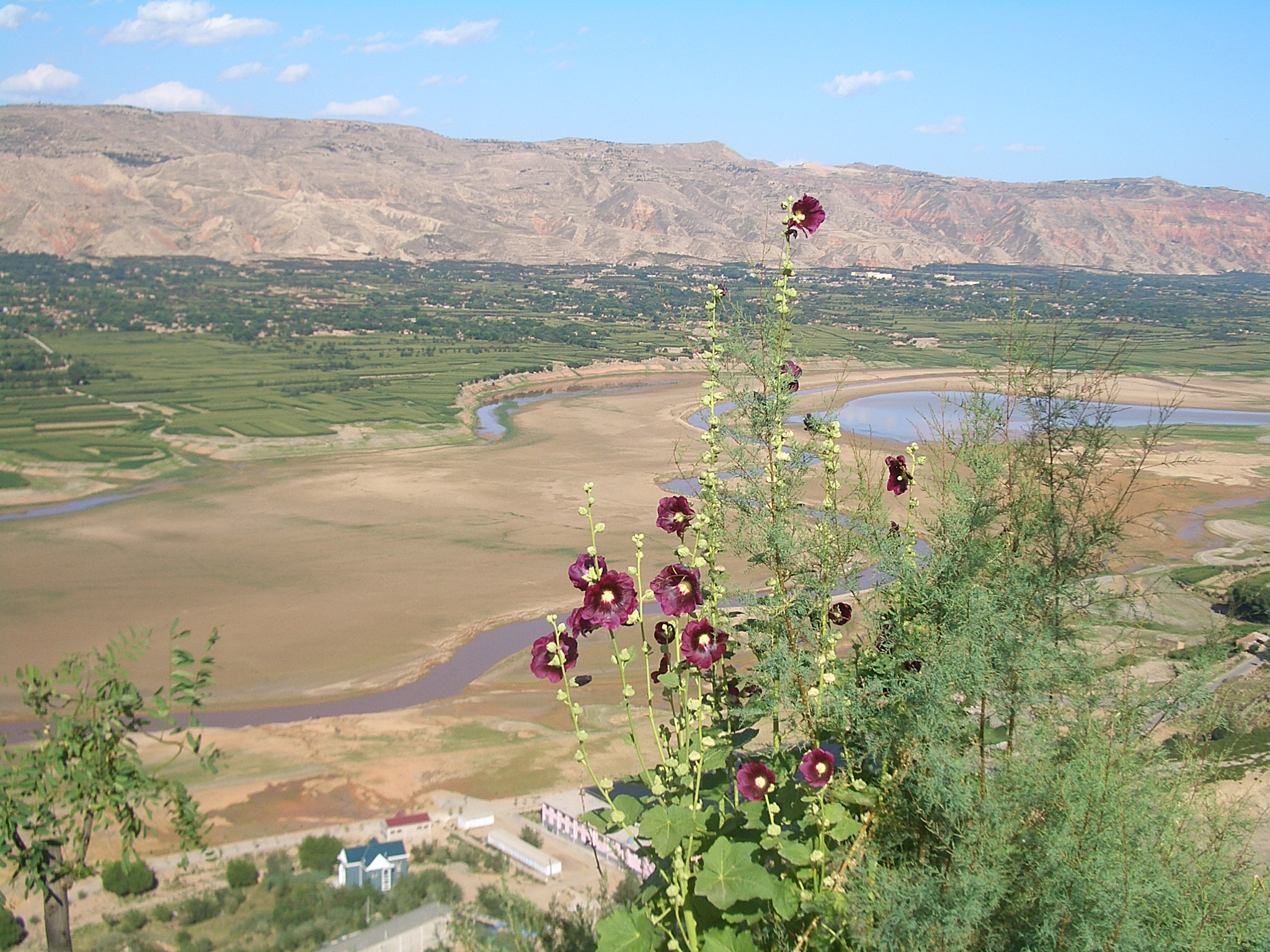
Farmland in Linxia

Due to poor natural conditions such as aridness, Gansu is one of the Chinese provinces with the smallest per capita area of arable land. Agricultural production includes cotton, linseed oil, maize, melons (such as the honeydew melon, known locally as the Bailan melon), millet, and wheat. Gansu is known as a source for wild medicinal herbs which are used in Chinese medicine. However, pollution by heavy metals, such as cadmium in irrigation water, has resulted in the poisoning of many acres of agricultural land. The extent and nature of the heavy metal pollution is considered a state secret.

=== Industry ===
The industrial sector in Gansu was developed after completion of the Longhai railway in 1953 and blueprinted in the first five-year plan of China. It was a major recipient of China's investment in industrial capacity during the Third Front campaign.

Until 2014, the industrial sector contributed the most to Gansu's economy. The most important industries are petrochemicals, non-ferrous metallurgy, machinery and electronics. The province is also an important base for wind and solar power. As a result of environmental protection policies, the industry sector is not growing. The manufacturing sector has been shrinking for several years and has low investment numbers.

In 2023, TMSR-LF1, an experimental molten salt nuclear breeder reactor, achieved criticality.

As stipulated in the country's 12th Five Year Plan, the local government of Gansu hopes to grow the province's GDP by 10% annually by focusing investments on five pillar industries: renewable energy, coal, chemicals, nonferrous metals, pharmaceuticals and services.

==== Mining ====
A large part of Gansu's economy is based on mining and the extraction of minerals, especially rare earth elements. The province has significant deposits of antimony, chromium, coal, cobalt, copper, fluorite, gypsum, iridium, iron, lead, limestone, mercury, mirabilite, nickel, crude oil, platinum, troilite, tungsten, and zinc among others. The oil fields at Yumen and Changqing are considered significant.

Gansu has China's largest nickel deposits accounting for over 90% of China's total nickel reserves.

=== Services ===
Shopping mall in Lanzhou

Since 2014, the service sector is the largest economic sector of Gansu. Tourism is a sector that is becoming of increased importance.

=== Economic and technological development zones ===
The following economic and technological zones are situated in Gansu:

- Lanzhou National Economic and Technological Development Zone was established in 1993, located in the center of Lanzhou Anning District. The zone has a planned area of 9.53 km^{2} (3.68 sq mi). 17 colleges, 11 scientific research institutions, 21 large and medium-size companies and other 1735 enterprises have been set up in the zone. Main industries include textile mills, rubber, fertilizer plants, oil refinery, petrochemical, machinery, and metallurgical industry.
- Lanzhou New & Hi-Tech Industrial Development Zone, Lanzhou Hi-Tech Industrial Development Zone, one of the first 27 national hi-tech industrial development zones, was established in 1998 covering more than 10 km^{2} (3.9 sq mi). It is expected to expand another 19 km^{2} (7.3 sq mi). The zone mainly focuses on Biotechnology, chemical industry, building decoration materials and information technology.

== Demographics ==
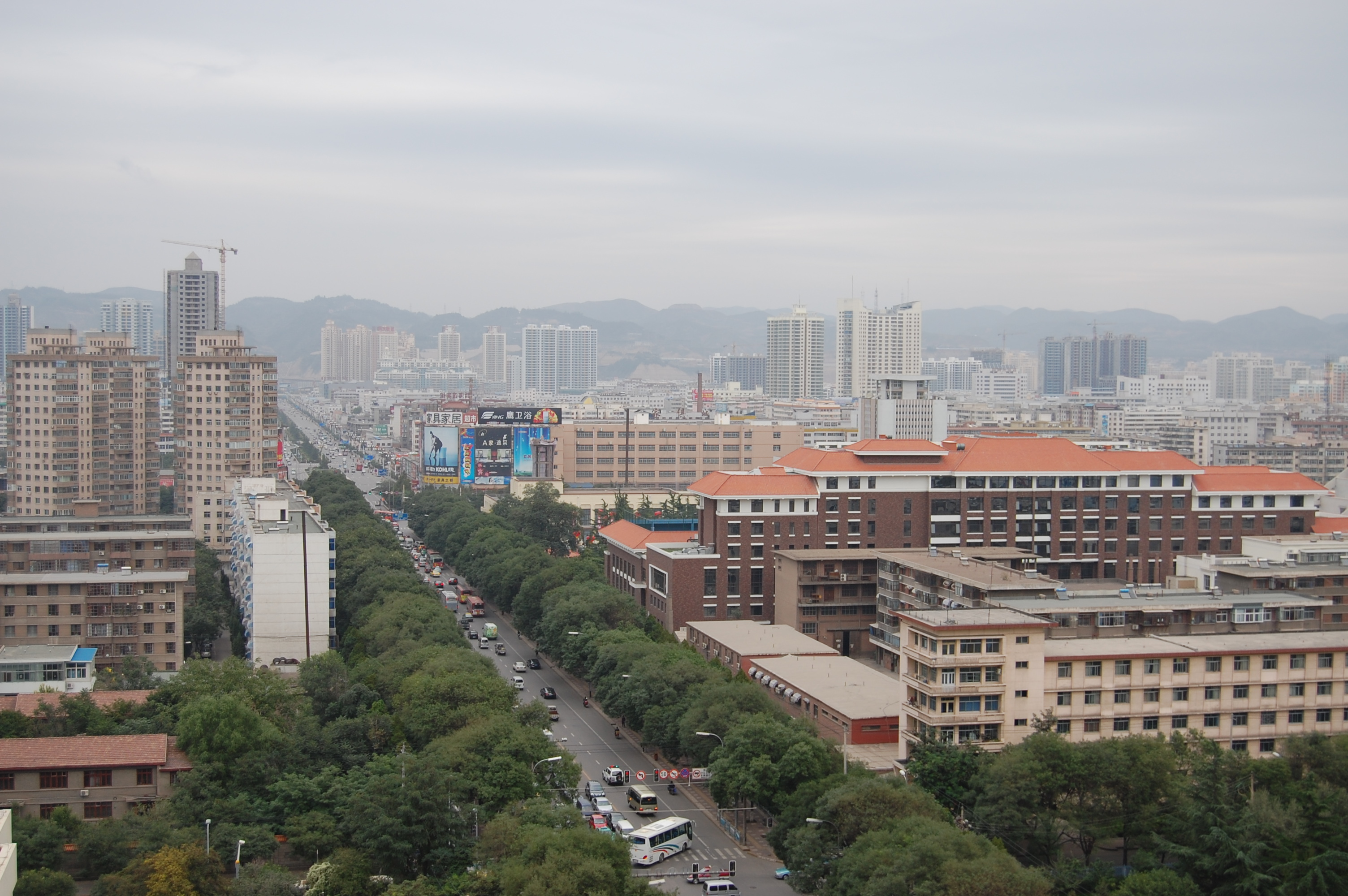
Lanzhou city

Historical population
Year	Pop.	±%
1912	4,990,000	—
1928	6,281,000	+25.9%
1936–37	6,716,000	+6.9%
1947	7,091,000	+5.6%
1954	12,928,102	+82.3%
1964	12,630,569	−2.3%
1982	19,569,261	+54.9%
1990	22,371,141	+14.3%
2000	25,124,282	+12.3%
2010	25,575,254	+1.8%
2020	25,019,831	−2.2%
2023 (est.)	24,650,000	−1.5%
Ningxia Province/AR was part of Gansu Province until 1929 and 1954–1958.

Gansu province is home to a little more than 25 million people. As of 2020, 47.7% of the population was rural, but much relocation in recent years has reduced this. Gansu is 89.4% Han and also has Hui, Tibetan, Dongxiang, Tu, Uyghurs, Yugur, Bonan, Mongolian, Salar and Kazakh minorities. Gansu province's community of Chinese Hui Muslims was bolstered by Hui Muslims resettled from Shaanxi province during the Dungan Revolt. Gansu is also a historical home, along with Shaanxi, of the dialect of the Dungans, who migrated to Central Asia. The southwestern corner of Gansu is home to a large ethnic Tibetan population. Modern Gansu is dominated by Lanzhou city and Linxia Hui prefectures, their growth hides the stark fact that much of the rest of the province is rapidly losing population.

Largest cities in Gansu Source: China Urban Construction Statistical Yearbook 2018 Urban Population and Urban Temporary Population
Rank		Pop.	Rank		Pop.
1	Lanzhou	2,460,700	11	Qingyang	207,700
2	Tianshui	696,600	12	Jinchang	171,500
3	Baiyin	406,500	13	Longnan	168,500
4	Jiuquan	389,100	14	Dunhuang	120,400
5	Wuwei	339,000	15	Huating	89,800
6	Pingliang	300,000	16	Yumen	77,300
7	Zhangye	270,300	17	Hezuo	72,600
8	Linxia	245,800
9	Jiayuguan	231,800
10	Dingxi	209,200

== Languages ==
Most of the inhabitants of Gansu speak dialects of Northern Mandarin Chinese. On the border areas of Gansu one might encounter Tu, Tibetan, Mongolian, Uyghur and the Kazakh language. Most of the minorities also speak Chinese.

== Culture ==
A unique variety of Chinese folk music identified with the local peoples of Gansu includes the Hua'er ('flowery melodies'), popular among the Han and nine ethnic groups of Gansu. The cuisine of Gansu is based on the staple crops grown there: wheat, barley, millet, beans, and sweet potatoes. Within China, Gansu is known for its lamian (pulled noodles), and Muslim restaurants which feature authentic Gansu cuisine.

=== Religion ===
Religion in Gansu (2012)
1. Non-religious and traditional faiths (88.0%)
2. Buddhism (8.20%)
3. Islam (3.40%)
4. Protestantism (0.40%)
5. Catholicism (0.10%)

According to a 2012 survey around 12% of the population of Gansu belongs to organized religions, the largest groups being Buddhists with 8.2%, followed by Muslims with 3.4%, Protestants with 0.4% and Catholics with 0.1%. Around 88% of the population may be either irreligious or involved in Chinese folk religion, Buddhism, Confucianism, Taoism, and folk religious sects.

- Taoism (Daoism): Over 210,000 adherents; 212 places of worship. The most famous site is Mount Kongtong (崆峒山) in Pingliang.
- Buddhism: Approximately 800,000 adherents; 682 places of worship. Of these, 450,000 follow Tibetan Buddhism—primarily among the Tibetan, Mongol, Tu, and Yugur ethnic groups—and 350,000 follow Chinese Buddhism. Labrang Monastery (拉卜楞寺) in Gannan is one of the six great monasteries of the Gelug school of Tibetan Buddhism.
- Abrahamic religions:
  - Islam: More than 1.6 million adherents—mainly Hui, Dongxiang, Salar, Bonan, and Kazakh; 3,731 mosques.
  - Protestantism: Approximately 60,000 adherents; 304 places of worship. Comprises 15 denominations, including, the China Inland Mission, the Assemblies of God, the Evangelical Alliance Mission, the Coordinating Council, the Seventh-day Adventist Church, the Brethren, the Baptist Church, the True Jesus Church, and others.
  - Roman Catholicism: Over 30,000 adherents; 83 places of worship.

Muslim restaurants are common, and feature typical Chinese dishes, but without any pork products, and instead an emphasis on lamb and mutton. Gansu has many works of Buddhist art, including the Maijishan Grottoes. Dunhuang was a major centre of Buddhism in the Middle Ages.

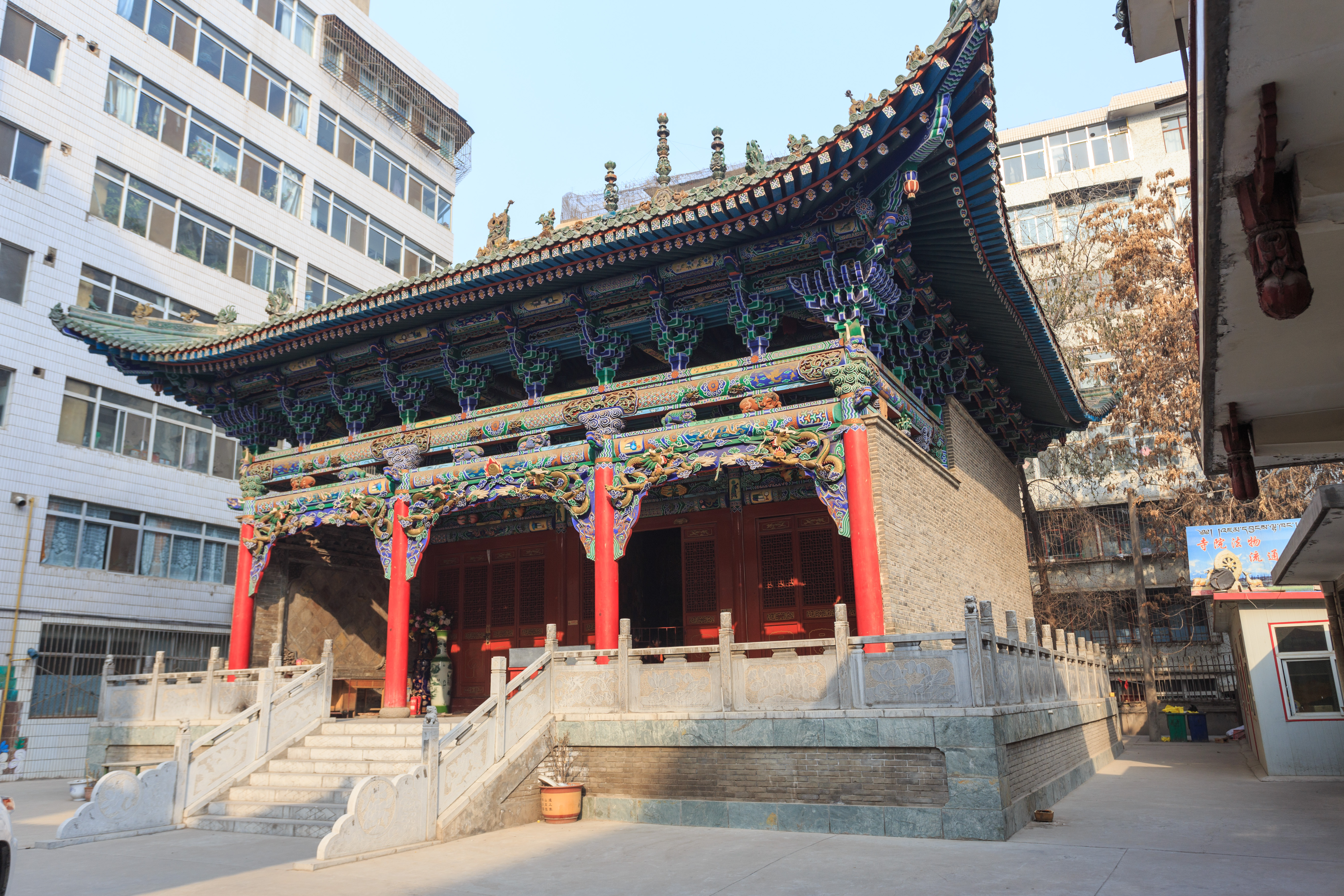
Main hall of a Chan temple of Lanzhou.

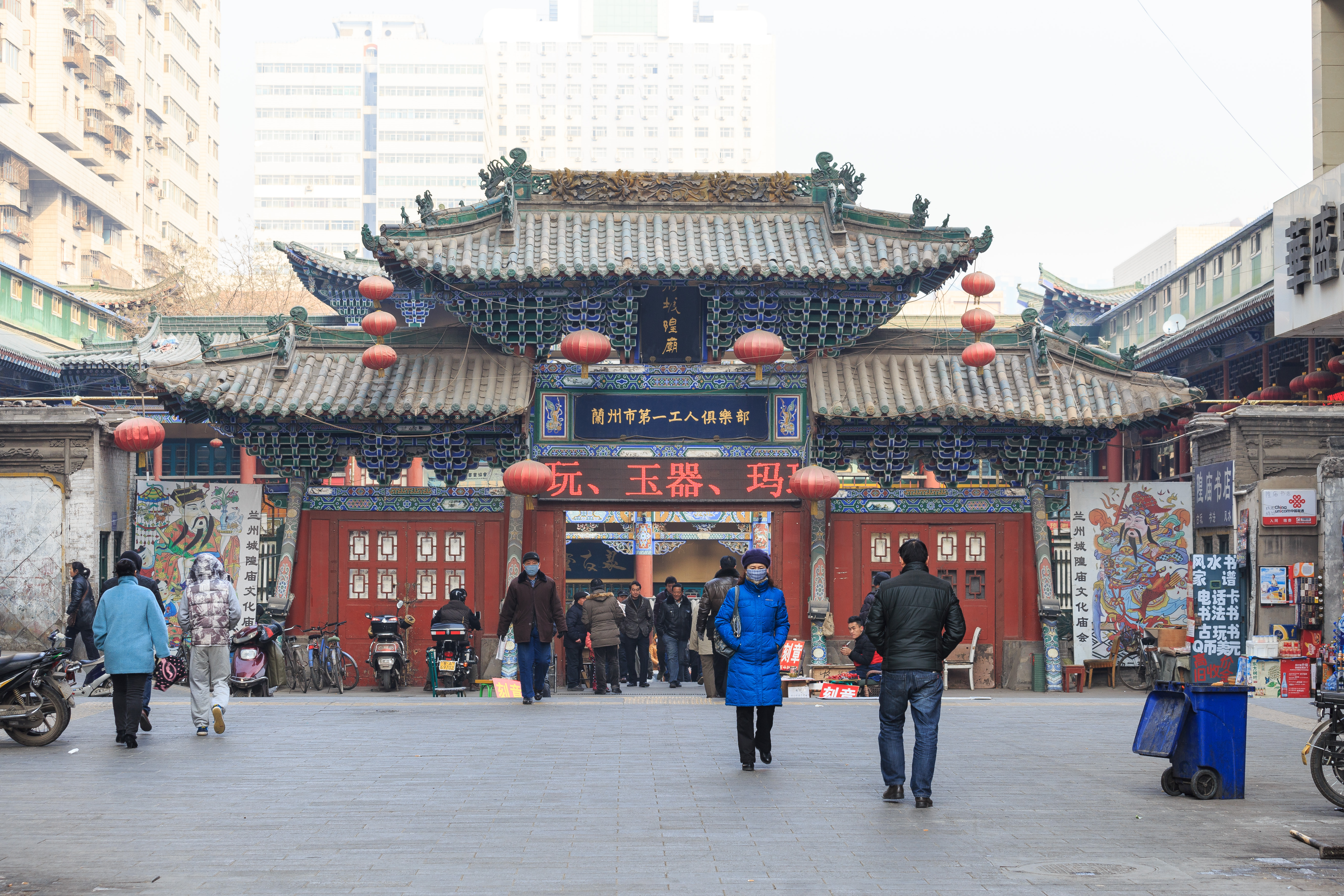
Temple of the Chenghuangshen (Idol) of Lanzhou.

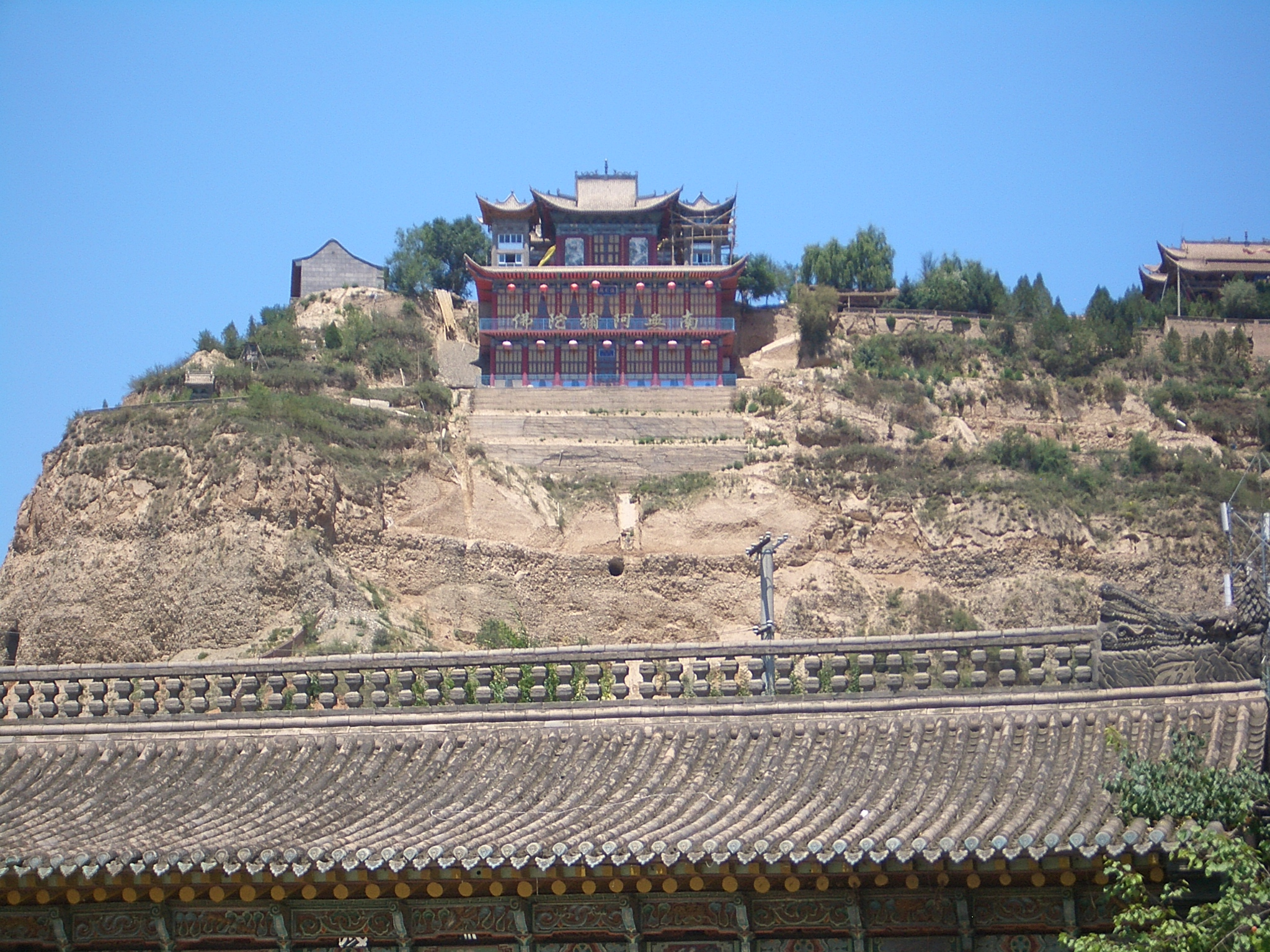
Nanhua Amituo Fo Temple of Chinese Buddhism seen on a hill above the roofs of the Yu Baba Gongbei, a Sufi shrine.

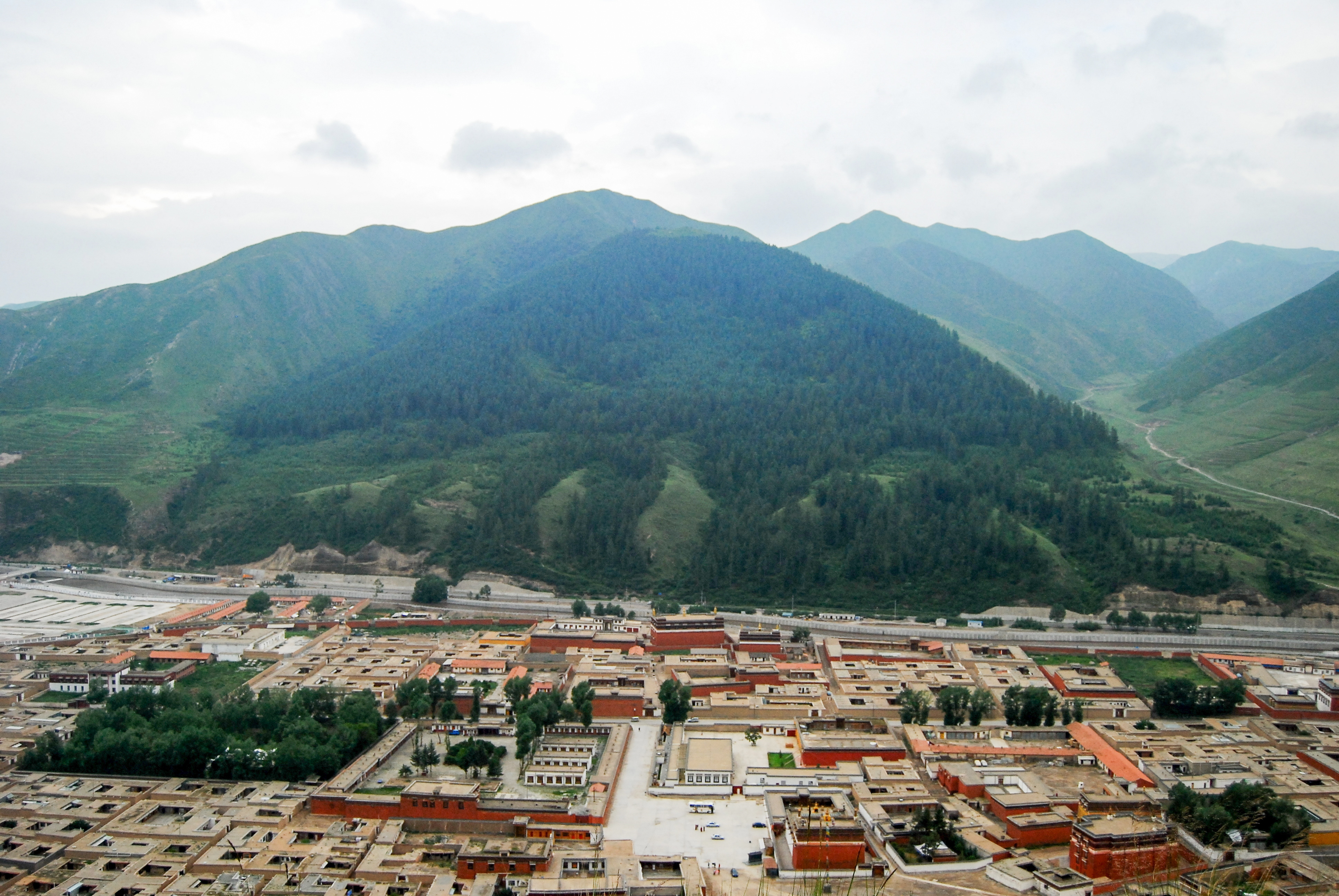
Labrang Monastery of Tibetan Buddhism in Gannan.

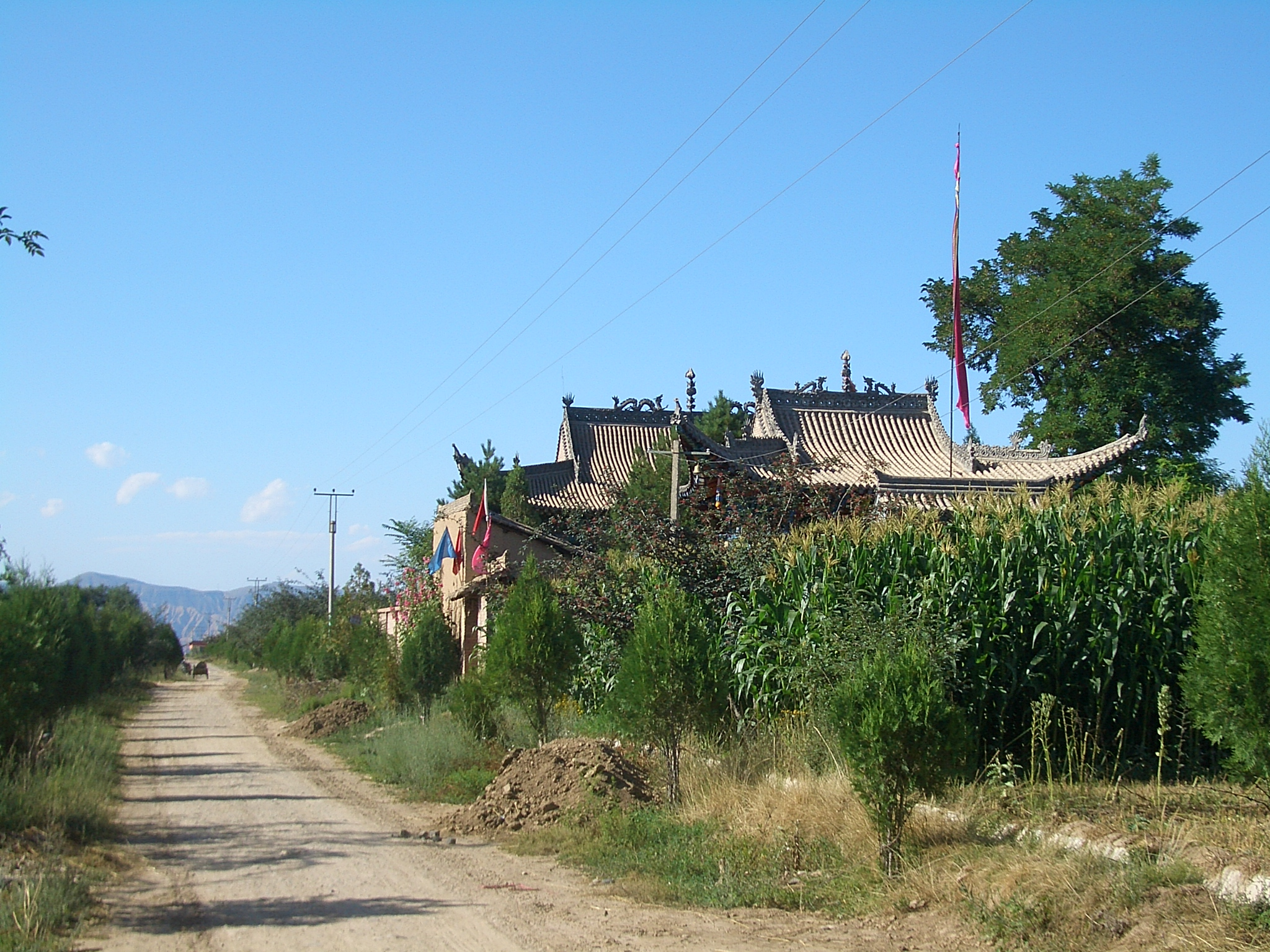
Village temple in Linxia County.

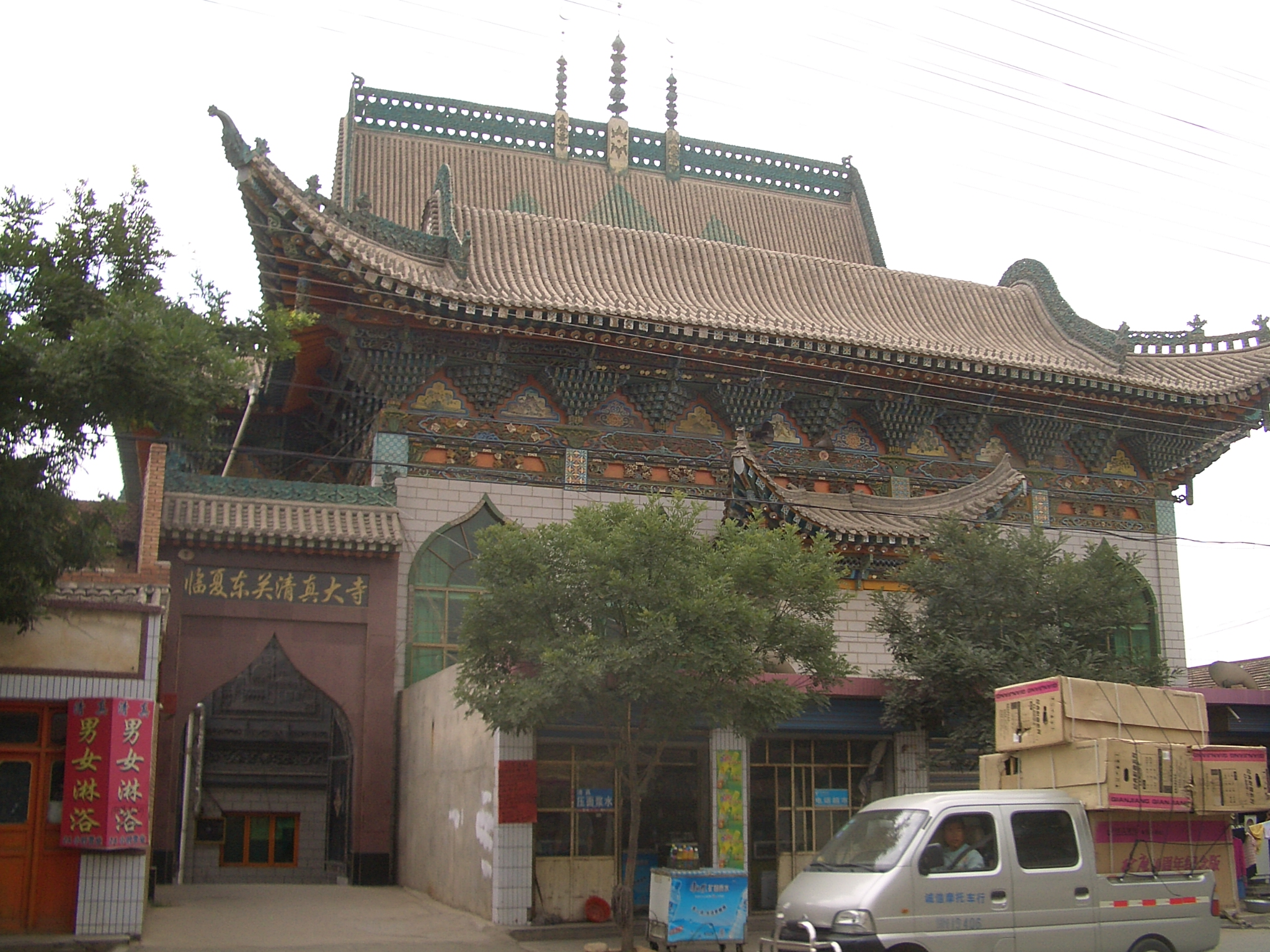
Linxia Dongguan Mosque

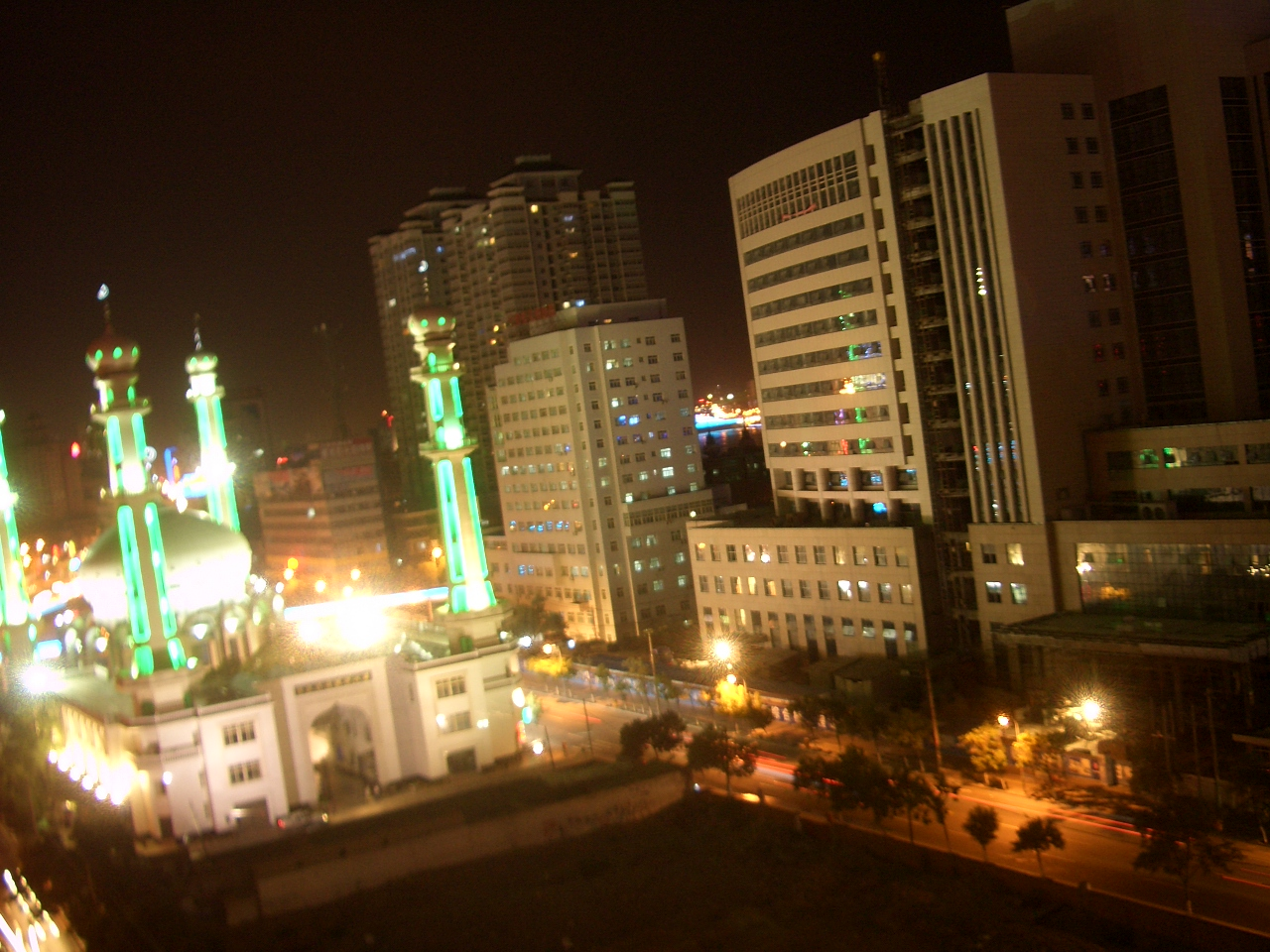
Lanzhou Xiguan Mosque

== Tourism ==
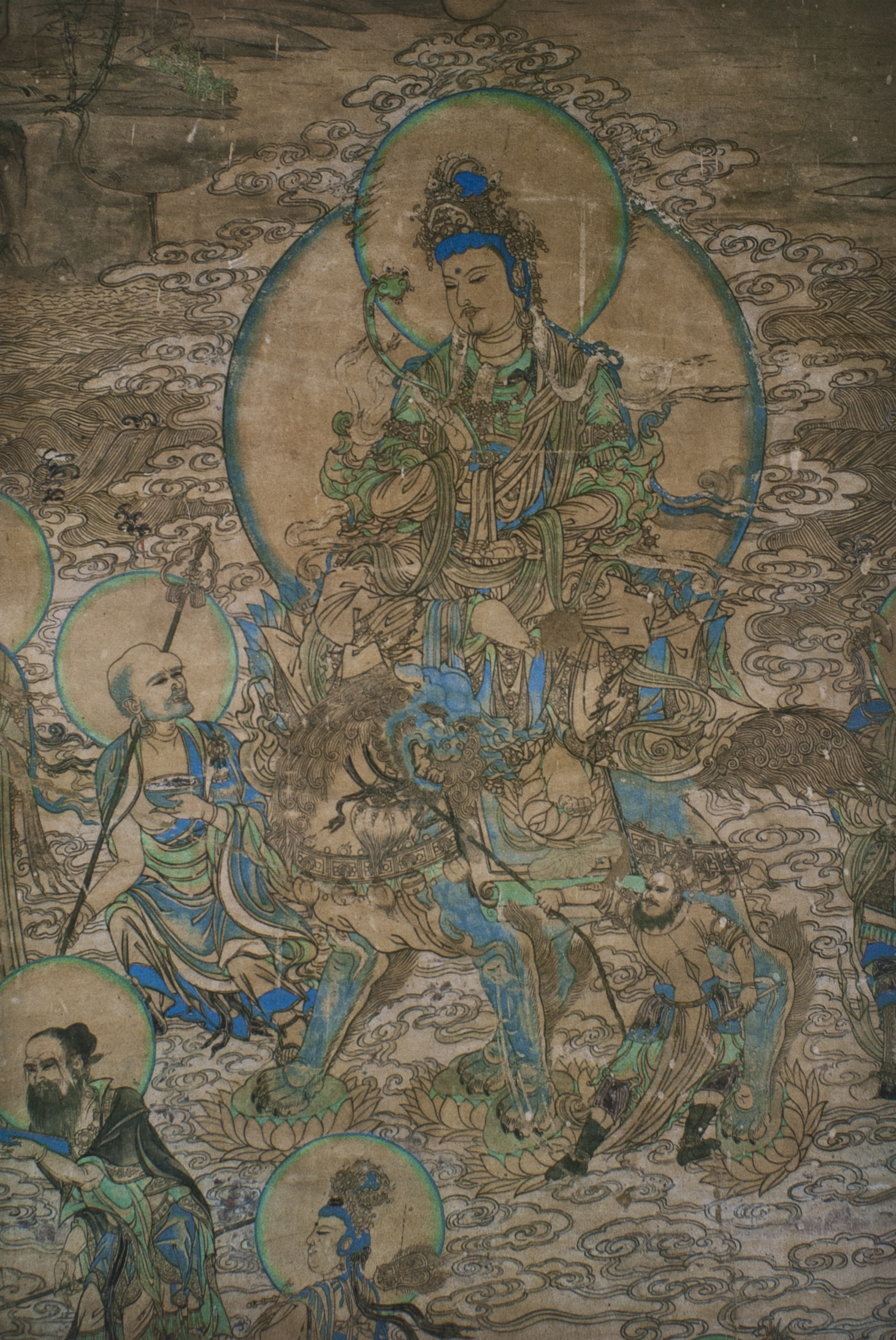
A painting of the Buddhist Manjushri, from the Yulin Caves of Gansu, Tangut-led Western Xia dynasty (1038–1227 AD)

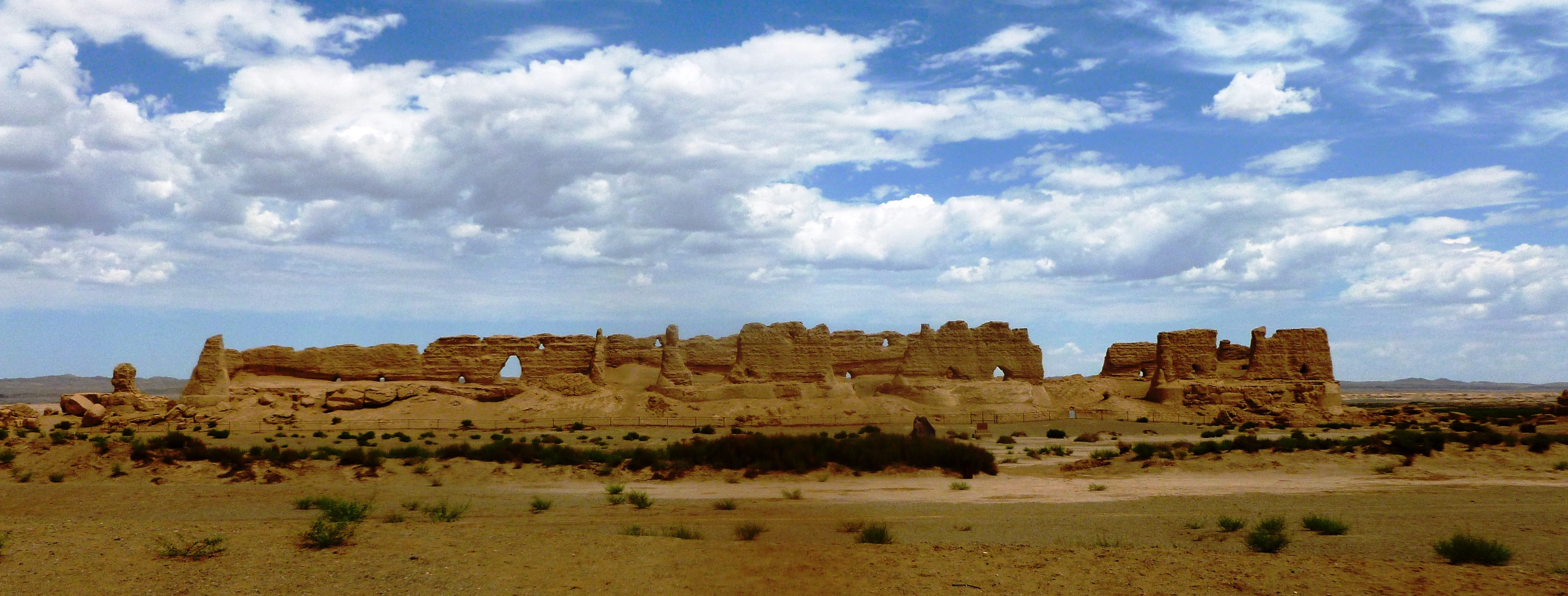
These rammed earth ruins of a granary in Hecang Fortress (Chinese: 河仓城；; pinyin: Hécāngchéng), located ~11 km (7 miles) northeast of the Western-Han-era Yumen Pass, were built during the Western Han (202 BC – 9 AD) and significantly rebuilt during the Western Jin (280–316 AD).

=== Jiayuguan Pass of the Great Wall ===
Jiayuguan Pass, in Jiayuguan city, is the largest and most intact pass, or entrance, of the Great Wall. Jiayuguan Pass was built in the early Ming dynasty, somewhere around the year 1372. It was built near an oasis that was then on the extreme western edge of China. Jiayuguan Pass was the first pass on the west end of the great wall so it earned the name "The First And Greatest Pass Under Heaven".

An extra brick is said to rest on a ledge over one of the gates. One legend holds that the official in charge asked the designer to calculate how many bricks would be used. The designer gave him the number and when the project was finished, only one brick was left. It was put on the top of the pass as a symbol of commemoration. Another account holds that the building project was assigned to a military manager and an architect. The architect presented the manager with a requisition for the total number of bricks that he would need. When the manager found out that the architect had not asked for any extra bricks, he demanded that the architect make some provision for unforeseen circumstances. The architect, taking this as an insult to his planning ability, added a single extra brick to the request. When the gate was finished, the single extra brick was, in fact, extra and was left on the ledge over the gate.

=== Mogao Grottoes ===
The Mogao Grottoes near Dunhuang have a collection of Buddhist art. Originally there were a thousand grottoes, but now only 492 cave temples remain. Each temple has a large statue of a buddha or bodhisattva and paintings of religious scenes. In 366 AD under the Former Liang dynasty, a monk named Le Zun (Lo-tsun) came near Echoing Sand Mountain, when he had a vision. He started to carve the first grotto. During the Five Dynasties period they ran out of room on the cliff and could not build any more grottoes.

=== Silk Road and Dunhuang City ===
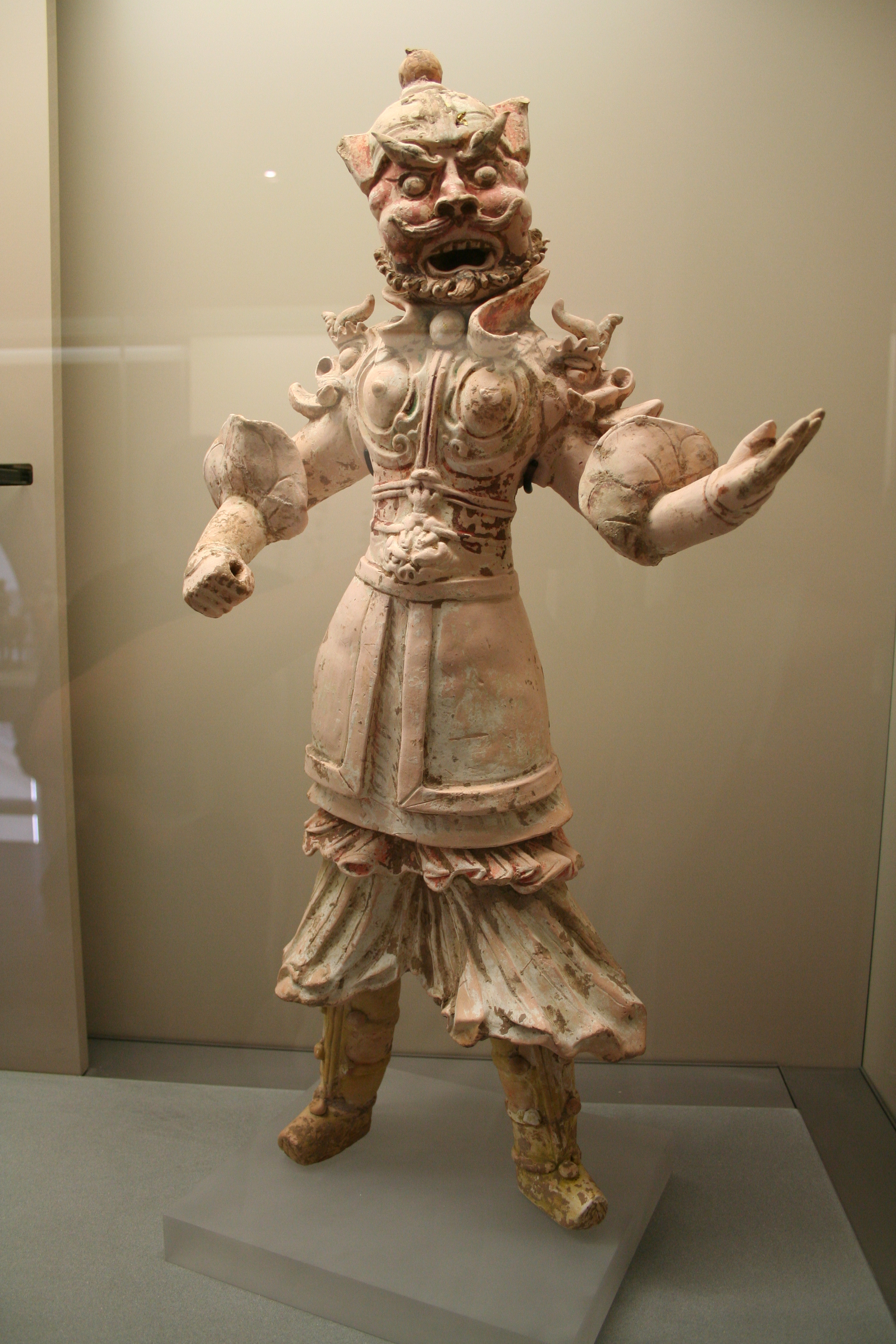
A terracotta warrior from Gansu, with traces of polychrome and gold, from the Tang dynasty (618–907)

The historic Silk Road starts in Chang'an (present-day Xi'an) and goes to Constantinople (Istanbul). On the way merchants would go to Dunhuang in Gansu. In Dunhuang they would get fresh camels, food and guards for the journey around the dangerous Taklamakan Desert. Before departing Dunhuang they would pray to the Mogao Grottoes for a safe journey, if they came back alive they would thank the gods at the grottoes. Across the desert they would form a train of camels to protect themselves from thieving bandits. The next stop, Kashi (Kashgar), was a welcome sight to the merchants. At Kashi most would trade and go back and the ones who stayed would eat fruit and trade their Bactrian camels for single humped ones. After Kashi they would keep going until they reached their next destination.

Located about 5 km (3.1 mi) southwest of the city, the Crescent Lake or Yueyaquan is an oasis and popular spot for tourists seeking respite from the heat of the desert. Activities includes camel and 4 × 4 rides.

=== Silk Route Museum ===
The Silk Route Museum is located in Jiuquan along the Silk Road, a trading route connecting Rome to China, used by Marco Polo. It is also built over the tomb of the Western Liang King.

=== Bingling Temple ===
Bingling Temple, or Bingling Grottoes, is a Buddhist cave complex in a canyon along the Yellow River. Begun in 420 AD during the Western Qin dynasty, the site contains dozens of caves and caverns filled with outstanding examples of carvings, sculpture, and frescoes. The great Maitreya Buddha is more than 27 meters tall and is similar in style to the great Buddhas that once lined the cliffs of Bamiyan, Afghanistan. Access to the site is by boat from Yongjing in the summer or fall. There is no other access point.

=== Labrang Monastery ===
Labrang Tashikyil Monastery is located in Xiahe County, Gannan Tibetan Autonomous Prefecture, located in the southern part of Gansu, and part of the traditional Tibetan province of Amdo. It is one of the six major monasteries of the Gelukpa tradition of Tibetan Buddhism in Tibet, and the most important one in Amdo. Built in 1710, it is headed by the Jamyang-zhaypa. It has 6 dratsang (colleges), and houses over 60,000 religious texts and other works of literature as well as other cultural artifacts.

=== Maijishan Grottoes ===
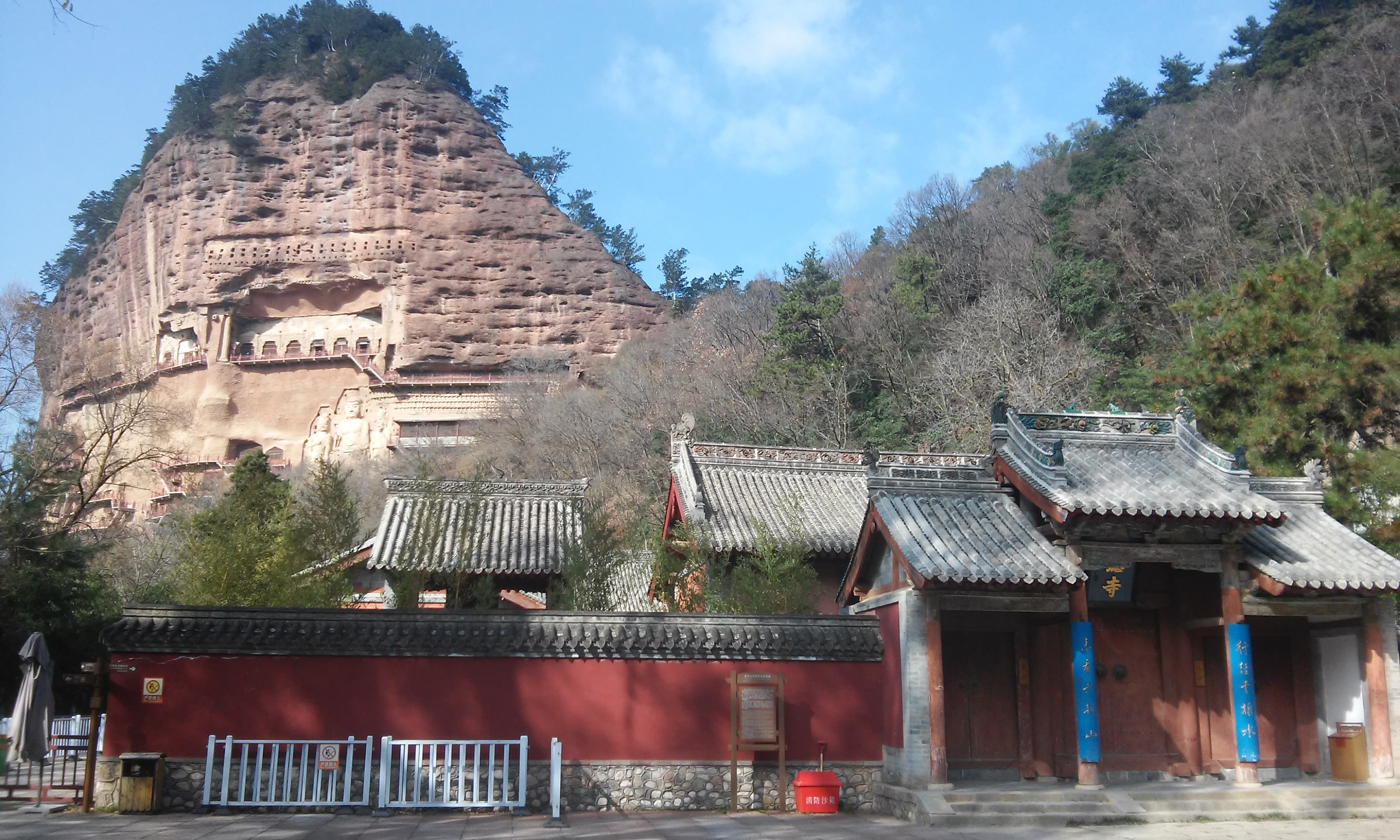
Maijishan Grottoes

The Maijishan Grottoes are a series of 194 caves cut in the side of the hill of Majishan in Tianshui. This example of rock cut architecture contains over 7,200 Buddhist sculptures and over 1,000 square meters of murals. Construction began in the Later Qin era (384–417 CE).

== Education ==
Gansu province is home to the only class A Double First Class University in China's northwest, Lanzhou University.

=== Colleges and universities ===
- Lanzhou University, Lanzhou (兰州大学)
- Northwest Normal University, Lanzhou (西北师范大学)
- Lanzhou University of Technology, Lanzhou (兰州理工大学)
- Lanzhou Jiaotong University, Lanzhou (兰州交通大学)
- Northwest University of Nationalities, Lanzhou (西北民族大学)
- Gansu Agricultural University, Lanzhou (甘肃农业大学)
- Lanzhou City University, Lanzhou (兰州城市学院)
- Gansu Political Science and Law Institute, Lanzhou (甘肃政法学院)
- Gansu University of Technology
- Lanzhou Commercial College
- Lanzhou Polytechnic College
- Hexi University, Zhangye (河西学院)
- Northwest Minority University
- Tianshui Normal College (Tianshui)
- Longdong College (Qingyang)

== Natural resources ==
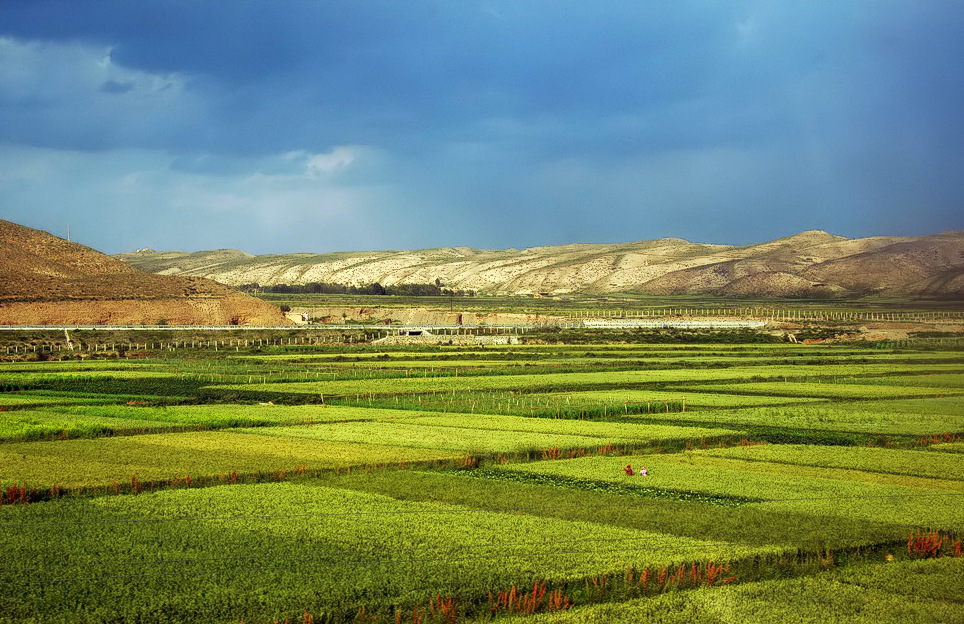
Fertile fields near Wuwei

=== Land ===
- 166,400 square kilometres (64,200 sq mi) grassland
- 46,700 square kilometres (18,000 sq mi) mountain slopes suitable for livestock breeding
- 46,200 square kilometres (17,800 sq mi) forests (standing timber reserves of 0.2 cubic kilometres (0.048 cu mi))
- 35,300 square kilometres (13,600 sq mi) cultivated land (1,400 square metres (15,000 sq ft) per capita)
- 66,600 square kilometres (25,700 sq mi) wasteland suitable for forestation
- 10,000 square kilometres (3,900 sq mi) wasteland suitable for farming

=== Minerals ===
Three thousand deposits of 145 different minerals. Ninety-four minerals have been found and ascertained, including nickel, cobalt, platinum, selenium, casting clay, finishing serpentine, whose reserves are the largest in China. Gansu has advantages in getting nickel, zinc, cobalt, platinum, iridium, copper, barite, and baudisserite.

=== Energy ===
Among Gansu's most important sources of energy are its water resources: the Yellow River and other inland river drainage basins. Gansu is placed ninth among China's provinces in annual hydropower potential and water discharge. Gansu produces 17.24 gigawatts of hydropower a year. Twenty-nine hydropower stations have been constructed in Gansu, capable of generating 30 gigawatts in total. Gansu has an estimated coal reserve of 8.92 billion tons and petroleum reserve of 700 million tons.

There is also a potential for wind and solar power development. The Gansu Wind Farm project – already producing 7.965GW in 2015 – is expected to achieve 20GW by 2020, at which time it will likely become the world's biggest collective windfarm.

In November 2017 an agreement between the Chinese Academy of Sciences and Gansu government was announced, to site and begin operations of a molten salt reactor pilot project in the province by 2020.

=== Flora and fauna ===
Gansu has 659 species of wild animals. It has 24 rare animals which are under a state protection.

Gansu's mammals include some of the world's most charismatic: the giant panda, golden monkeys, lynx, snow leopards, sika deer, musk deer, and the Bactrian camel.

Among zoologists who study moles, the Gansu mole is of great interest. For a reason that can only be speculated, it is taxologically a New World mole living among Old World moles: that is to say, an American mole living in a sea of Euro-Asians.

Gansu is home to 441 species of birds; it is a center of endemism and home to many species and subspecies which occur nowhere else in the world.

Gansu is China's second-largest producer of medicinal plants and herbs, including some produced nowhere else, such as the hairy asiabell root, fritillary bulb, and Chinese caterpillar fungus.

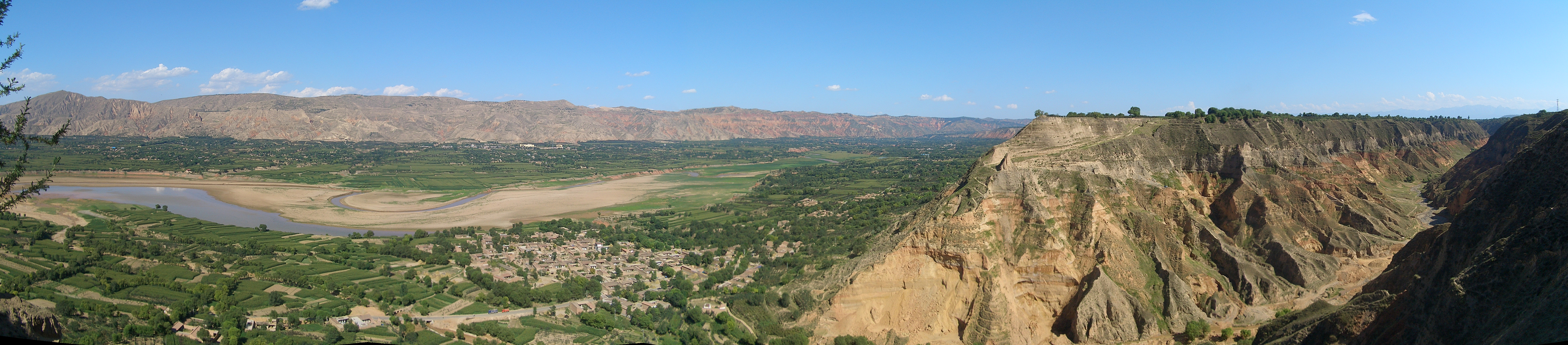
Panorama of the lower Daxia River valley in the northeast of the Linxia County, and the Loess Plateau flanking it, cut by a canyon

== Environment ==
=== Natural disasters ===
On 16 December 1920, Gansu witnessed the deadliest landslide ever recorded. A series of landslides, triggered by a single earthquake, accounted for most of the 180,000 people killed in the event.

=== Anti-desertification project ===
The Asian Development Bank is working with the State Forestry Administration of China on the Silk Road Ecosystem Restoration Project, designed to prevent degradation and desertification in Gansu. It is estimated to cost up to US$150 million.

== Space launch center ==
The Jiuquan Satellite Launch Center, located in the Gobi desert, is named after the city of Jiuquan, Gansu, the nearest city, although the center itself is in the Inner Mongolia Autonomous Region.

== See also ==
- Huangyangchuan
- List of Major National Historical and Cultural Sites in Gansu
- List of prisons in Gansu
- Silk Road transmission of Buddhism
