= Huangyangchuan =

Village in Gu Lang Gorgean, Gansu Province, China

Coordinates: 37°22′49″N 103°03′56″E

Huangyangchuan (simplified Chinese: 黄羊川镇; traditional Chinese: 黃羊川鎮; pinyin: Huángyángchuān Zhèn; lit. 'Town of Yellow Sheep River') is a village situated in Gu Lang Gorgean, an arid, mountainous region of Gansu Province, China. It is home mostly to poor families who rely on agriculture for their income.

== Film ==
Yellow Sheep River is also the name of a film about sheep farmers from the village. The documentary is without dialogue or subtitles, and follows the farmers to provide a picturesque view of rural life.
