= Andingsi Grottoes =

Buddhist site in Gansu, China

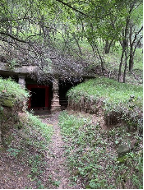
Appearance of Andingsi Grottoes

The Andingsi Grottoes (Chinese: 安定寺石窟; pinyin: Āndìng sì shíkū) is the name given to a Buddhist site commissioned in 1132 AD containing hundreds of Bodhisattvas, Arhats, and Buddhas carved into the walls and columns of the two chambers of this small cave.

Located one kilometer west of Longwangmiaogou Village, this grotto belongs to the wider Heshui Grottoes group found within Heshui County, Qingyang City in Gansu Province. For an unknown period of time, this grotto was abandoned and most of its structures were buried. Only in 1989 was the grotto officially recorded and restored by the Chinese government, though at that time many of the carvings were already damaged.

== History ==
On the right side of the grotto's entrance lies an inscription carved into the wall that indicates that Andingsi Grottoes was built in two stages. The cave was commissioned in 1132 AD (阜昌二年) by Li Dafu (李大夫). However, at that time the figures of bodhisattvas and arhats had yet to be carved into the walls and many of them were unfinished. It was not until 46 years later, in 1178 AD (大定十八年), when the cave was finally improved by Li Shixiong (李世雄), Li Dafu's son. In this second stage, Li Shixiong also invited many monks such as Deren (德忍) and Liangpeng (良朋) to become abbots (住持) at this site. At the same time, many Dunwu colonels (敦武校尉) with the surname Li participated in the excavation of Andingsi Grottoes as sponsors (功德主). It can also be speculated that these individuals belonged to the same clan as Li Shixiong. Although this section stage completed the bodhisattva and arhat sculptures left unfinished by the first, researchers have continued to find indications that Andingsi Grotto was actually never finished.

When the Grotto was later discovered by the local townspeople, most of the buddha heads had already been destroyed. While not confirmed, the locals have indicated that these sculptures were either destroyed during the Cultural Revolution or by tomb robbers. The remaining intact buddha sculptures and the heads of the broken statues have since been transferred to Longdong Ancient Carvings Stone Art Museum (陇东古代石刻艺术博物馆) for preservation.

== Grottoes interior ==
The Andingsi Grottoes contains two chambers, the antechamber and the main chamber. The antechamber is a rectangle shaped room that has 412 Bodhisattvas and Arhats carved on the walls and columns. These carvings are found primarily on the right and left walls, forming eight rows. Most of these sculptures are in the full lotus posture or the Lalitasana pose. However, many of them also have their heads missing. Additionally, on the right wall, the sculptures have been eroded by the elements, removing any clear indications about the sculptures shapes. In front of the antechamber, there are two symmetrical stone pillars. There is also a paved path leading to the main chamber carved into the facade of the antechamber.

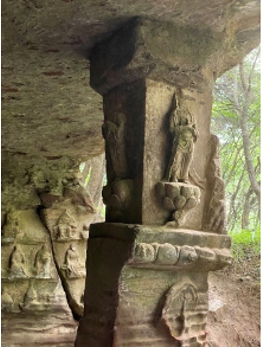
Grotto Interior

The main chamber of the Andingsi Grottoes is laid out in a square shape with three walls having arhats carved into them. However, all of these sculptures were again eroded. On the facade of the main room, there are eight rows of arhats carved into the wall. On the right side of the facade there are 6 rows of arhats, each about 0.2 meters tall, carved into the wall in various poses. On the right side of the facade there are two rows of Arhats all covered into the wall in lotus position. The left side of the main chamber has two rows of carvings, each with five arhats sitting on thrones in lotus position. On the right wall, the area closest to the facade contains two rows each with two Arhats. The upper portion of the wall contains five statues, three of them incomplete. The lower portion of the wall has an additional four statues that are thought to be Bodhisattvas. Unlike the antechamber, the main room also contains a central altar. On this altar there are three seated Buddha statues, four retinues, one standing Buddha, one Maitreya, and two Bodhisattvas. One Buddha head and two statues that were preserved by Longdong Ancient Carvings Stone Art Museum (陇东古代石刻艺术博物馆) came from this central altar.

== See also ==
- Western Thousand Buddha Caves
- Eastern Thousand Buddha Caves
- Mogao Caves
- Yulin Caves
- Bingling Temple
- Five Temple Caves
- Maijishan Grottoes
- Tiantishan Caves
- Chinese Buddhism
- Baoquansi Caves
- Lianhua Temple-Cave
