= Baoquansi Caves =

Buddhist site in Gansu, China

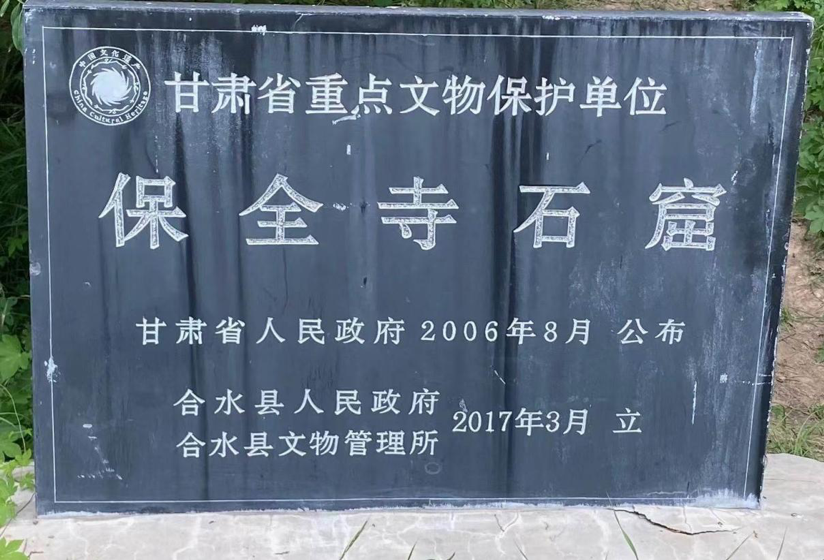
Baoquan Temple Grottoes, Heshui County, Gansu Province

The Baoquansi Caves (Chinese: 保全寺石窟; pinyin: Bǎoquánsìshíkū) is a Buddhist site located on the western bank of Pingdingchuan, Taibai Township, Heshui County, Gansu in Northwest China. Built during the Northern Wei Dynasty (386AD–534AD) and excavated on an 8-meter tall cliff, Baoquansi consists of 25 horseshoe-shaped niches and 153 stone statues. Most of the niches have been well preserved, however some parts have been damaged by erosion and looting. The Baoquansi Caves is a valuable site to study the spread of Buddhism since it is located on one of the ancient northern Silk Road paths.

== Niches description & list ==
The Baoquansi Caves were carved into a cliff wall and are 40 meters long and eight meters high, with the grottoes running east to west. Among the niches, three, four, five, and six are the largest. Some of these niches are square-shaped while others are horseshoe-shaped or domed. The largest of all is niche four. The width, height, and depth are all three meters. The main wall consists of the Buddhas Śākyamuni and Prabhūtaratna sitting side by side with Maitreya. The north and south walls are each composed of two Buddhas. There are also two Bodhisattva standing at the entrance.

List of Niches
Niche No.	Time Period	Content	Current Condition
1	Early Northern Wei (Year 477–499)	One Buddha, two Bodhisattva	Good
2	Early Northern Wei (Year 477–499)	One Buddha, two Bodhisattva	The Bodhisattva in good condition; the other two statues eroded
3	Early Northern Wei (Year 477–499)	Cross-legged Bodhisattva, two Buddhas sitting by each other, Manjusri, small Buddhas on the wall	Two Buddhas' face destroyed; cross-legged Bodhisattva face eroded; left Manjusri eroded
4	Early Northern Wei (Year 477–499)	Cross-legged Bodhisattva, two Buddhas sitting by each other, Manjusri, small Buddhas on the wall	Two Buddhas' surface destroyed; Manjusri's upper body destroyed
5	Early Northern Wei (Year 477–499)	One Buddha, two Bodhisattva	Collected by the Longdong Ancient Carved Stone Art Museum (Chinese: 陇东古石刻艺术博物馆)
6	Early Northern Wei (Year 477–499)	Eleven Buddha statues	Heads damaged
7	Late Northern Wei to Western Wei (Year 534–557)	Cross-legged Bodhisattva, two Buddhas sitting by each other	Heads damaged
8	Late Northern Wei to Western Wei (Year 534–557)	Buddha statue	Head damaged
9	Late Northern Wei to Western Wei (Year 534–557)	One Buddha, two Bodhisattva	Heads damaged
10	Late Northern Wei to Western Wei (Year 534–557)	One Buddha, two Bodhisattva	Leg lost for the right Bodhisattva
11	Late Northern Wei to Western Wei (Year 534–557)	One Buddha, two Bodhisattva	Face eroded
12	Late Northern Wei to Western Wei (Year 534–557)	One Buddha, two Bodhisattva	Heads damaged
13	Mid Northern Wei (Year 490–512)	Two Buddha statues	Heads damaged
14	Mid Northern Wei (Year 490–512)	One Buddha, two Bodhisattva	Collected by the Longdong Ancient Carved Stone Art Museum (Chinese: 陇东古石刻艺术博物馆)
15	Mid Northern Wei (Year 490–512)	Cross-legged Bodhisattva, two Manjusri	Heads damaged
16	Late Northern Wei to Western Wei (Year 534–557)	Buddha statue	Eroded
17	Late Northern Wei to Western Wei (Year 534–557)	Buddha statue	Eroded
18	Late Northern Wei to Western Wei (Year 534–557)	Buddha statue	Eroded
19	Late Northern Wei to Western Wei (Year 534–557)	Two Buddha statues	Faces damaged
20	Late Northern Wei to Western Wei (Year 534–557)	Unknown	Damaged due to erosion
21	Late Northern Wei to Western Wei (Year 534–557)	Two Buddha statues	Faces damaged
22	Late Northern Wei to Western Wei (Year 534–557)	One Buddha, two Bodhisattva	Manjusri destroyed
23	Late Northern Wei to Western Wei (Year 534–557)	Cross-legged Buddha, lion head, Buddha head	Lion and Buddha heads eroded
24	Late Northern Wei to Western Wei (Year 534–557)	One Buddha, two Bodhisattva	Only legs remain
25	Late Northern Wei to Western Wei (Year 534–557)	One Buddha, two Bodhisattva	Eroded
26	Late Northern Wei to Western Wei (Year 534–557)	Unknown	Damaged due to erosion
27	Late Northern Wei to Western Wei (Year 534–557)	Unknown	Damaged due to erosion
28	Late Northern Wei to Western Wei (Year 534–557)	Unknown	Damaged due to erosion
29	Late Northern Wei to Western Wei (Year 534–557)	Five Buddha statues	Partially remained
30	Late Northern Wei to Western Wei (Year 534–557)	Unknown	Damaged due to erosion
31	Early Northern Wei (Year 477–499)	Strongman statue	Lower body covered in ground; head missing
32	Late Northern Wei (Year 512–534)	One Buddha, two Bodhisattva	Heads damaged
33	Late Northern Wei (Year 512–534)	Buddha statue	Head damaged
34	Late Northern Wei (Year 512–534)	Unknown	Statue building incomplete
35	Late Northern Wei (Year 512–534)	Buddha statue	Collected by the Longdong Ancient Carved Stone Art Museum (Chinese: 陇东古石刻艺术博物馆)
36	Late Northern Wei (Year 512–534)	Buddha statue	Eroded
37	Late Northern Wei (Year 512–534)	One Buddha, two Bodhisattva	Collapsed
38	Late Northern Wei (Year 512–534)	Unknown	Damaged due to erosion
39	Late Northern Wei (Year 512–534)	Unknown	Damaged due to erosion
40	Late Northern Wei (Year 512–534)	Unknown	Damaged due to erosion
41	Late Northern Wei (Year 512–534)	Unknown	Damaged due to erosion

== Murals ==
During the mid to late Northern Wei Dynasty, murals, utilizing many colors, were used to emphasize different characters. These murals mainly included images of the Asparas, the Bodhisattva, the thousand buddhas, Buddha, and donors. These characters were often portrayed as tall and thin figures with a clear compositional outline. Various shades of green were also used heavily during the Northern Wei Dynasty. Complementary and supplementary colors were used to create a total sense of harmony.

== Relic destruction, protection, and relocation ==
Across Chinese history, there has been looting and destruction of Buddha statues, however, this was exacerbated in the late 19th and 20th centuries. During the Cultural Revolution, there was an increased belief in destroying ancient Chinese culture. For instance, the "Destroy the Four Olds" motto led to the mass destruction of antique items. After the Cultural Revolution, the Gansu government listed these caves in the Provincial Cultural Relics Protection Unit and sent caretakers to look after the caves. However, despite this protection, looting still continued to plague the area. As a result, the government decided to move three Buddha statues in the best condition to the Longdong Ancient Carved Stone Art Museum (Chinese: 陇东古石刻艺术博物馆), where they are now preserved.

== See also ==
- Western Thousand Buddha Caves
- Eastern Thousand Buddha Caves
- Mogao Caves
- Yulin Caves
- Bingling Temple
- Five Temple Caves
- Maijishan Grottoes
- Tiantishan Caves
- Chinese Buddhism
- Andingsi Grottoes
- Lianhua Temple-Cave
