= Lianhua Temple-Cave =

Buddhist site in Gansu, China

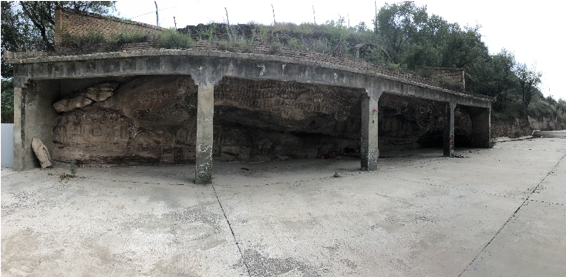

The Lianhua Temple-Cave, also known as the Lianhuasi Grottoes (Chinese: 莲花寺石窟; pinyin: Liánhuā sì shí kū) is located 15 kilometers from Taibai Township in Heshui County. It is the historical and cultural site protected at the providential level by Gansu government.

There are 25 grottoes and niches with over a thousand statues, from the Tang and Song dynasties, located in this site. In the area of Pingdingchuan, Lianhua Temple-Cave is one of the biggest and most well-preserved grottoes and specifically, given the many sculptures from the Tang and Song dynasties that display carving skills and special workmanship.

== Cave structures ==
The buddha statues in the Lianhua Temple-Cave could be separated into two registers, where the upper part includes the statues of the 500 Arhats (罗汉), and the lower part includes 18 caves with varied sizes.

=== Cave 21 ===
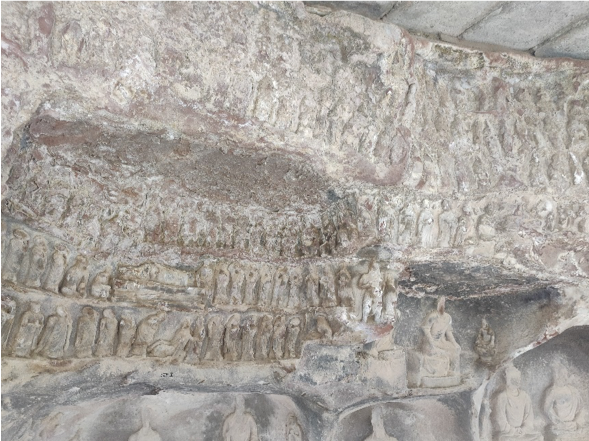

The main story highlighted in the Lianhua Temple-Cave is Śākyamuni's (释迦摩尼) nirvana in Cave 21. Being the largest and most important cave, Cave 21 depicts the 500 Arhats gathered together after Śākyamuni's nirvana. The cave of the 500 Arhats was carved by the monk, Hui Wen's (慧文) family, who lived at the Heshui County during the Song dynasty. In the center of the cave lies the carved figure of Śākyamuni on his side. Next to his head, two of his followers are crying on the ground. Further surrounding him are many Arhats gazing at him with great respect. On the right side of the nirvana, many of Śākyamuni's followers, either on their knees or standing, are crying near the golden coffin. On the right side of the golden coffin, there is also a building, however, all the figures inside are too damaged to be seen clearly. On the lower right side of the building is a pagoda that is five to six stories tall with many Arhats surrounding it.

=== Cave 16 ===
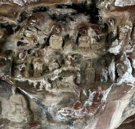

Cave 16 is right above cave 15. This cave has two main levels. The lower level depicts an Avalokitesvara (观世音) statue. It is 0.61 meters tall, and its face has been destroyed. It has many decorations including collar, crown, and wreath. It is sitting on a lotus base with the posture called Lalitasana (游戏坐). On the left side of Avalokitesvara, there are two disciples with both hands put together. On the right side of Avalokitesvara, there are three disciples doing the same gesture but with two of whom standing and another on the knees. On the upper level, there are four small caves surrounding the head of the Buddha. In every small cave, there is a sitting Arhat with the hands in the sleeves.

== See also ==
- Western Thousand Buddha Caves
- Eastern Thousand Buddha Caves
- Mogao Caves
- Yulin Caves
- Bingling Temple
- Five Temple Caves
- Maijishan Grottoes
- Tiantishan Caves
- Chinese Buddhism
- Baoquansi Caves
- Andingsi Grottoes
