= Dunhuang Caves (disambiguation) =

The Dunhuang Caves may be one of five archaeological sites around Dunhuang in Gansu:

- Mogao Caves ("Caves of the Thousand Buddhas")
- Western Thousand Buddha Caves
- Eastern Thousand Buddha Caves
- Yulin Caves ("Ten Thousand Buddha Caves")
- Five Temple Caves
