= Five Temple Caves =

Buddhist site in Gansu, China

The Five Temple Caves (simplified Chinese: 五个庙石窟; traditional Chinese: 五個廟石窟; pinyin: Wǔgèmiào shíkū) is a series of rock cut Buddhist caves in Subei Mongol Autonomous County, Gansu, northwest China. The complex once numbered twenty-two caves but over the centuries the number was reduced to five, of which four remain today, in a gorge on the left bank of the Danghe River (党河). On the basis of their structure and iconography, one of the caves is dated to the Northern Wei, the other three to the Five Dynasties and Song. The complex lies some 80 kilometres (50 mi) to the south of the Mogao Caves, and together with these, the Western Thousand Buddha Caves, Eastern Thousand Buddha Caves, and Yulin Caves, is one of the five grotto sites in the vicinity of Dunhuang managed by the Dunhuang Academy. In 2013, in recognition of their significance to China, the Five Temple Caves were designated by SACH a Major Historical and Cultural Site Protected at the National Level.

== Caves ==
There are four caves with murals:

Cave	Construction	Modification	Subject matter	Type
Cave 1	Northern Wei/Northern Zhou	Western Xia or Yuan	Tejaprabhā Buddha, Twelve Signs and Twenty-Eight Mansions of the zodiac	central pillar
Cave 2	Northern Wei/Northern Zhou		honeysuckle pattern; fire-damaged	rectangular, with front (collapsed) and rear chambers
Cave 3	Northern Zhou	Western Xia	Vimalakīrti, Mañjuśrī, Avalokiteśvara	rectangular, with front (collapsed) and rear chambers
Cave 4	Northern Zhou/Five Dynasties	Western Xia	Samantabhadra, Thousand Buddhas	rectangular, with front (collapsed) and rear chambers

== One Temple Cave ==
A further five kilometres to the south, on the east bank of the Danghe, is a site known as the One Temple Cave (simplified Chinese: 一个庙石窟; traditional Chinese: 一個廟石窟; pinyin: Yīgèmiào shíkū) (39°35′59″N 94°48′48″E). One cave with murals survives, showing donor figures and dated to the tenth century.

== See also ==
- Major National Historical and Cultural Sites (Gansu)
- Principles for the Conservation of Heritage Sites in China
- Tiantishan Caves
