= Dunhuang (disambiguation) =

Dunhuang or Dun-Huang is a city in Gansu, China.

Dunhuang may also refer to:

- The Silk Road (film), the 1988 Japanese film also known as Dun-Huang
- Dun Huang (film), the 2005 full-length documentary directed by Zhou Bing
- Dunhong, a mountain of the Tian Shan range proposed to be the Dunhuang mentioned in Shiji by Sima Qian
- Dunhuang (crater), a crater on Mars
- Dunhuang Caves
- Dunhuang manuscripts

== See also ==
- Dunhuang Caves (disambiguation)
