= Thousand Buddha Caves =

Thousand Buddha Caves or Qianfo Grottoes may refer to the following Buddhist caves in China:

- Mogao Caves or Thousand Buddha Caves, Dunhuang
- Eastern Thousand Buddha Caves
- Western Thousand Buddha Caves
- Bezeklik Thousand Buddha Caves
- Kumtura Thousand Buddha Caves
- Kizil Caves or Kizil Thousand Buddha Caves
