= List of Major National Historical and Cultural Sites in Gansu =

This list is of Major Sites Protected for their Historical and Cultural Value at the National Level in the Province of Gansu, People's Republic of China.

| Site | Chinese name | Location | Designation | Image |
|---|---|---|---|---|
| Mogao Caves | 莫高窟 Mògāo kū | 40°02′14″N 94°48′15″E Dunhuang | 1-35 | Upload file |
| Yulin Caves | 榆林窟 Yúlín kū | 40°03′33″N 95°56′10″E Guazhou County | 1-36 | Upload file |
| Maijishan Grottoes | 麦积山石窟 Màijīshān shíkū | 34°21′08″N 106°00′10″E Tianshui | 1-38 | Upload file |
| Bingling Temple Grottoes | 炳灵寺石窟 Bǐnglíngsì shíkū | 35°49′36″N 103°01′12″E Yongjing County | 1-39 | Upload file |
| Great Wall at the Jiayu Pass | 万里长城-嘉峪关 Wànlǐ chángchéng-jiāyùguān | 39°48′05″N 98°12′57″E Jiayuguan | 1-103 | Upload file |
| Western Xia Stele | 重修护国寺感应塔碑(西夏碑) Chóngxiū hùguósì gǎnyìng tǎ bēi (xīxià bēi) | Wuwei | 1-130 | Upload file |
| Labrang Monastery | 拉卜楞寺 Lāboléng sì | 35°11′44″N 102°30′29″E Xiahe County | 2-43 | Upload file |
| Northern Cave Temples | 北石窟寺 Běishíkū sì | Qingyang | 3-43 | Upload file |
| Southern Cave Temples | 南石窟寺 Nánshíkū sì | Jingchuan County | 3-44 | Upload file |
| Dadiwan Site | 大地湾遗址 Dàdìwān yízhǐ | 31°14′03″N 105°03′11″E Qin'an County | 3-189 | Upload file |
| Majiayao Site | 马家窑遗址 Mǎjiāyáo yízhǐ | 35°18′45″N 103°48′48″E Lintao County | 3-190 | Upload file |
| Yumen Pass and Beacons | 玉门关及长城烽燧遗址 Yùménguān jí chángchéng fēngsuì yízhǐ | 40°21′13″N 93°51′51″E Dunhuang | 3-210 | Upload file |
| Qijiaping Site | 齐家坪遗址 Qíjiāpíng yízhǐ | Guanghe County | 4-21 | Upload file |
| Luotuocheng (Camel City) ruins | 骆驼城遗址 Luòtuóchéng yízhǐ | Gaotai County | 4-40 | Upload file |
| Suoyang City ruins | 锁阳城遗址 Suǒ yáng chéng yízhǐ | 40°14′48″N 96°12′10″E Guazhou County | 4-50 | Upload file |
| Dafo Temple, Zhangye | 张掖大佛寺 Zhāngyē dàfósì | Zhangye | 4-112 | Upload file |
| Xingguo Temple | 兴国寺 Xīngguó sì | Qin'an County | 4-127 | Upload file |
| Confucian Temple, Wuwei | 武威文庙 Wǔwēi wénmiào | Wuwei | 4-163 | Upload file |
| Lu Tusi Yamen | 鲁土司衙门旧址 Lǔ Tǔsī yámén jiùzhǐ | Yongdeng County | 4-164 | Upload file |
| Mati Temple Grottoes | 马蹄寺石窟群 Mǎtí sì shíkū qún | Sunan County | 4-190 | Upload file |
| Red Army Huining Conference site | 会宁红军会师旧址 Huìníng hóngjūn huìshī jiùzhǐ | 35°41′20″N 105°03′05″E Huining County | 4-237 | Upload file |
| Nanzuo Site | 南佐遗址 Nánzuǒ yízhǐ | Qingyang | 5-120 | Upload file |
| Dabuzishan site and cemetery | 大堡子山遗址及墓群 Dàbǔzishān yízhǐ jí mù qún | Li County | 5-121 | Upload file |
| Heishuiguo ruins | 黑水国遗址 Hēishuǐ guóyízhǐ | Zhangye | 5-122 | Upload file |
| Xuanquanzhi ruins | 悬泉置遗址 Xuánquánzhì yízhǐ | Dunhuang | 5-123 | Upload file |
| Xusanwan ruins and cemetery | 许三湾城及墓群 Xǔsānwānchéng jí mùqún | Gaotai County | 5-124 | Upload file |
| White Pagoda Temple | 白塔寺遗址 Báitǎ sì yízhǐ | Wuwei | 5-125 | Upload file |
| Guoyuan-Xincheng Cemetery | 果园-新城墓群 Guǒyuán-xīnchéng mùqún | Jiuquan | 5-185 | Upload file |
| Wang Family Cemetery | 汪氏家族墓地 Wāng shì jiāzú mùdì | Zhang County | 5-186 | Upload file |
| Leitai Han Tombs | 雷台汉墓 Léitái hàn mù | Wuwei | 5-187 | Upload file |
| Fuxi Temple | 伏羲庙 Fúxī miào | Tianshui | 5-430 | Upload file |
| Hu Family Residence | 胡氏古民居建筑 Hú shì gǔ mínjū jiànzhú | Tianshui | 5-431 | Upload file |
| Ningshou Temple Pagoda | 凝寿寺塔 Níng shòu sì tǎ | Ning County | 5-432 | Upload file |
| Yuantong Temple Pagoda | 圆通寺塔 Yuántōng sì tǎ | Minle County | 5-433 | Upload file |
| Shengrong Temple Pagodas | 圣容寺塔 Shèngróng sì tǎ | Yongchang County | 5-434 | Upload file |
| Donghuachi Pagoda | 东华池塔 Dōnghuáchí tǎ | Huachi County | 5-435 | Upload file |
| Prince of Wukang Temple | 武康王庙 Wǔkāng wáng miào | Chongxin County | 5-436 | Upload file |
| Xixiasong Inscription | 西峡颂摩崖石刻 Xīxiá sòng móyá shíkè | Cheng County | 5-468 | Upload file |
| Shuiliandong - Daxiangshan Caves | 水帘洞-大像山石窟 Shuǐlián dòng-dàxiàngshān shíkū | Wushan County | 5-469 | Upload file |
| Tiantishan Caves | 天梯山石窟 Tiāntīshān shíkū | Wuwei | 5-470 | Upload file |
| Wenshushan Caves | 文殊山石窟 Wénshūshān shíkū | Sunan County | 5-471 | Upload file |
| Hadapu Conference site | 哈达铺会议旧址 Hādápù huìyì jiùzhǐ | Tanchang County | 5-511 | Upload file |
| Linjia Site | 林家遗址 Línjiā yízhǐ | Dongxiang Autonomous County | 6-202 | Upload file |
| Niumendong Site | 牛门洞遗址 Niúméndòng yízhǐ | Huining County | 6-203 | Upload file |
| Siwa site | 寺洼遗址 Sìwā yízhǐ | 35°12′45″N 103°48′30″E Lintao County | 6-204 | Upload file |
| Xihetan Site | 西河滩遗址 Xīhétān yízhǐ | Jiuquan | 6-205 | Upload file |
| Huoshaogou Site | 火烧沟遗址 Huǒshāogōu yízhǐ | Yumen | 6-206 | Upload file |
| Pochengzi ruins | 破城子遗址 Pòchéngzǐ yízhǐ | Guazhou County | 6-207 | Upload file |
| Bagyuaying ruins | 八卦营城址 Bāguàyíng chéngzhǐ | Minle County | 6-208 | Upload file |
| Bajiaocheng ruins | 八角城城址 Bājiǎochéng chéngzhǐ | Xiahe County | 6-209 | Upload file |
| Yongtai City ruins | 永泰城址 Yǒngtài chéngzhǐ | 37°08′11″N 103°50′45″E Jingtai County | 6-210 | Upload file |
| Tombs of Ming Princes of Su | 明肃王墓 Míng sù wáng mù | Yuzhong County | 6-288 | Upload file |
| Xiangle Brick Pagoda | 湘乐砖塔 Xiānglè zhuāntǎ | Ning County | 6-794 | Upload file |
| Yuquan Temple | 玉泉观 Yùquán guān | Tianshui | 6-795 | Upload file |
| Houjie Mosque | 后街清真寺 Hòujiē qīngzhēnsì | Tianshui | 6-796 | Upload file |
| Gan'en Temple, Hongcheng | 红城感恩寺 Hóngchéng gǎn'ēn sì | Yongdeng County | 6-797 | Upload file |
| Qin'an Confucian Temple | 秦安文庙 Qín'ān wénmiào | Qin'an County | 6-798 | Upload file |
| Zhangye Drum Tower | 张掖鼓楼 Zhāngyē gǔlóu | Zhangye | 6-799 | Upload file |
| Xilai Temple | 西来寺 Xīlái sì | Zhangye | 6-800 | Upload file |
| Zhao stone arches in Luochuan | 罗川赵氏石坊 Luōchuān zhào shì shífāng | Zhengning County | 6-801 | Upload file |
| Yongchang Bell and Drum Tower | 永昌钟鼓楼 Yǒngchāng zhōng gǔlóu | Yongchang County | 6-802 | Upload file |
| Yan'en Temple Pagoda | 延恩寺塔 Yán'ēn sì tǎ | Pingliang | 6-803 | Upload file |
| Zhangye Assembly Hall | 张掖会馆 Zhāngyē huìguǎn | Zhangye | 6-804 | Upload file |
| Yunya Temple and Chenjiadong Grottoes | 云崖寺和陈家洞石窟 Yúnyá sì hé chénjiādòng shíkū | Zhuanglang County | 6-868 | Upload file |
| Muti Temple Caves | 木梯寺石窟 Mùtī sì shíkū | Wushan County | 6-869 | Upload file |
| Wangmugong Caves | 王母宫石窟 Wángmǔgōng shíkū | Jingchuan County | 6-870 | Upload file |
| Xinxiu Baishui lu ji stone inscriptions | 《新修白水路记》摩崖 “Xīnxiū báishuǐ lù jì” móyá | Hui County | 6-871 | Upload file |
| Zhongshan Bridge | 兰州黄河铁桥 Lánzhōu huánghé tiěqiáo | 36°03′53″N 103°48′52″E Lanzhou | 6-1070 | Upload file |
| Rui'an Fort | 瑞安堡 Ruì'ān bǎo | Minqin County | 6-1071 | Upload file |
| Baling Bridge | 灞陵桥 Bàlíng qiáo | 35°08′05″N 104°13′01″E Weiyuan County | 6-1072 | Upload file |
| Ejie Conference site | 俄界会议旧址 Éjiè huìyì jiùzhǐ | Têwo County | 6-1073 | Upload file |

== See also ==
- Principles for the Conservation of Heritage Sites in China
- International Dunhuang Project
