= Qorxmazoba =

- Municipality
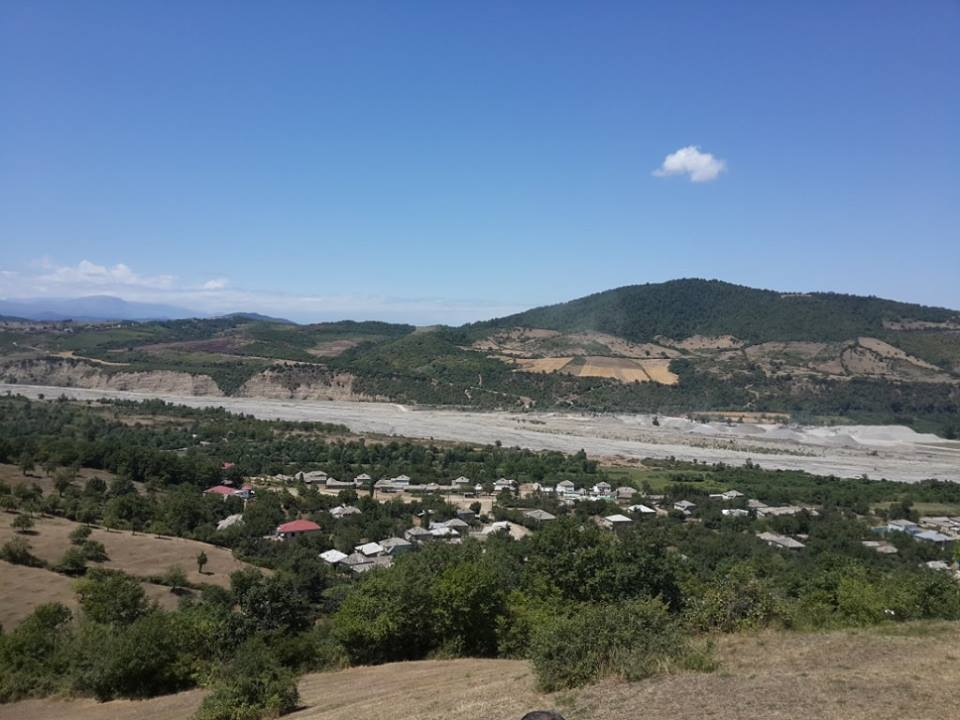

- Location within Azerbaijan
- Coordinates: 41°16′00″N 48°41′58″E
- Country: Azerbaijan
- Rayon: Quba

Population
  - Total: 831
- Time zone: UTC+4 (AZT)
  - Summer (DST): UTC+5 (AZT)

Qorxmazoba (also, Qorx-mazoba) is a village and municipality in the Quba district of Azerbaijan. It has a population of 831. The municipality consists of the villages of Qorxmazoba and Əspərəsti.
