= Eastern Thousand Buddha Caves =

Buddhist site in Gansu, China

Coordinates: 40°10′06″N 96°25′27″E

The Eastern Thousand Buddha Caves (simplified Chinese: 东千佛洞; traditional Chinese: 東千佛洞; pinyin: Dōng Qiānfó Dòng) is a series of rock cut Buddhist caves in Guazhou County, Gansu, northwest China. Of the twenty-three caves excavated from the conglomerate rock, eight have murals and sculptures dating from the Western Xia and Yuan dynasty; many of the statues were reworked during the Qing dynasty. The caves extend in two tiers along the cliffs that flank both sides of a now dry river gorge, fourteen on the west bank (five with decoration) and nine on the east (three with decoration). Together with the Mogao Caves, Western Thousand Buddha Caves, Yulin Caves, and Five Temple Caves, the Eastern Thousand Buddha Caves is one of the five grotto sites in the vicinity of Dunhuang managed by the Dunhuang Academy.

== Caves ==
Eight caves are decorated with murals and sculptures:

Cave	Construction	Modification	Location
Cave 1	Yuan		west cliff; north end, lower tier
Cave 2	Western Xia	Qing (sculptures)	west cliff; centre, lower tier
Cave 3	Yuan	Qing (sculptures)	west cliff; south end, upper tier
Cave 4	Western Xia		west cliff; centre, upper tier
Cave 5	Western Xia		west cliff; centre, upper tier
Cave 6	Yuan	Qing (sculptures)	east cliff; north end, upper tier
Cave 7	Yuan	Qing (sculptures)	east cliff; centre, upper tier
Cave 8	Western Xia		east cliff; centre, upper tier

== See also ==
- Major National Historical and Cultural Sites (Gansu)
- Principles for the Conservation of Heritage Sites in China
- Tiantishan Caves
