= China National Highway 211 =

Road in China

National Highway 211
- 211国道

Route information
- Length: 691 km (429 mi)

Major junctions
- From: Yinchuan in Ningxia
- To: Xi'an in Shaanxi

Location
- Country: China

Highway system
- National Trunk Highway System; Primary; Auxiliary
← G210	→ G212

China National Highway 211 (G211) runs from Yinchuan in Ningxia to Xi'an in Shaanxi. It is 691 kilometres in length and runs southwest from Wuning in Ningxia and then turns southeast on a virtual straight line to Xi'an via primarily rural areas.

== Route and distance ==
Route and distance

City	Distance (km)
Yinchuan, Ningxia	0
Yongning, Ningxia	20
Wuzhong, Ningxia	59
Huanxian, Gansu	263
Qingyang, Gansu	354
Heshui, Gansu	385
Ningxian, Gansu	422
Xunyi, Shaanxi	536
Chunhua, Shaanxi	607
Sanyuan, Shaanxi	653
Xi'an, Shaanxi	691

== See also ==
- China National Highways
