= Zhou Bing =

Chinese documentary director (born 1968)

- Born: 1 April 1968 (age 58)
- Occupations: Director, producer, professor

Chinese name
- Chinese: 周兵
- Hanyu Pinyin: Zhōu Bing

Zhou Bing (周兵; born 1 April 1968) is a Chinese documentary director. He holds a PhD from the College of History at Nankai University. Zhou has been named "Best Documentary Film Director" three times and has created over 100 documentaries and other productions. His works include Palace, Dun Huang, and Road of Millennia Bodhi. All three aired on CCTV, National Geographic, SKY TV, the History Channel, Arte, and NDR. Currently, he runs the Beijing Oriental Elites Culture Development Co. Ltd and works with Tiong Hiew King, the Datuk of Tan Sri, Malaysia, at Sun Media International Co. Ltd. and Zero Media International Co. Ltd. Throughout his career, Zhou has attempted to combine the industrialized process of documentary film making with the identity of independent directors. Zhou is also an adjunct professor in the Department of Media and Communication at the City University of Hong Kong. Zhou aspires to broadcast Chinese culture to the world through photographs and images.

== Biography ==
- From 1993 to 1995, Zhou created and produced the shows Masters of Chinese Art, Masters of Arts and Crafts, and Chinese Scholars. People featured in these shows included the artists Zhu Qizhan and Wu Zuoren, masters such as Gao Gongbo and Li Bosheng, and scholars like Ji Xianlin and Fei Xiaotong. Zhou also produced about a hundred episodes of Oriental Sons. Oriental Sons featured people such as Bing Xin and Chen-Ning Yang.
- In August 1995, Zhou directed and produced China's first series of experimental programs for "Representation of Reality", called Unforgettable.
- In 1996, he served as Writer-Director of a full-length documentary called Zhou Enlai. This documentary was awarded the Special Award of Documentary Academic Committee, Five-One Project Awards and Special Awards from China TV Golden Eagle Awards.
- In 1997, Zhou directed Mei Lanfang 1930. Starting from this program, he began producing documentaries of people through “representation of reality” as the major film and television exploring means. He also tried producing TV programs by cinematic techniques and operation modes. This program won the Second Level Award from Chinese Documentary Academic Committee.
- In July 1999, Zhou served as the Chief Writer-Director of Memories, a full-length documentary jointly produced by Oriental Time and Space and China Television Media Co. Ltd.
- Zhou sorted prominent Chinese figures of the 20th century and produced them into television programs, including 30 historical and cultural celebrities such as Huang Xing, Cai E, Lu Xun, Mei Lanfang, Liang Sicheng, Shen Congwen, A Bing, Yan Yangchu, Soong Ching-ling (also Song Qingling), and Lu Zuofu. These TV programs received positive responses both from the TV theory field and the public audiences after broadcasting. In September 2000, Zhou worked as the producer of Oriental Time and Space and Chronicle. During this time, he planned and organized the broadcasting of over a hundred episodes of documentaries.
- In May 2002, Zhou was in charge of planning, organizing and hosting a large academic activity, "Review and Screen the Past Two Decades of Chinese TV Documentary." Some comments said that this meeting was one of the 'Top 3 Meetings of Chinese TV Documentary in Two Decades.' In the same year, he acted as the keynote speaker at a Report Meeting of CCTV's Research Projects hosted by the Research Bureau of CCTV's Chief Editing Office.
- In May 2003, Zhou served as the chief director of Imperial Palace, a full-length documentary. This was the first time that the Imperial Palace fully and openly cooperated with CCTV, and was a prominently large-scale television production through jointly and solidly sorting China's history, culture, and art.
- In 2004, Zhou planned a full-length documentary called War of Resistance. His documentary won numerous awards, including Best Full-length Documentary and Best Cinematography in the category of Humanity and Social Class from the International “Gold Panda” Awards, and Best Writer-Director and Best Cinematography of the 23rd China TV “Golden Eagle.” The documentary was also rated as Best Writing and Top 10 Documentaries of China TV.
- In 2005, Zhou directed the full-length documentary Mei Lanfang. Mei Lanfang was nominated as a Top 10 Documentary and won Academy Award.
- In 2005, Zhou also served as Chief Director of Dunhuang, a full-length documentary. Dunhuang won Special Jury Award of Golden Panda in the category of humanity class in 2009 and First Level Award of Program for Documenting China 2009.
- In 2006, Zhou acted as Producer and Art Director for KunQu. KunQu won Outstanding Documentary Award of 24th China TV Golden Eagle Awards.
- During the period from 2005 to 2007, Zhou took part in the joint production of the international edition of The Imperial Palace, whose name became Decoding of The Forbidden City. It was broadcast in 26 languages among 164 countries in the world, with 290 million families watching.
- In 2007, Zhou served as one of the Chief directors of When the Louvre Meets the Forbidden City. This was the first time the Louvre Museum opened its gate to Chinese film crews at such a large scale. When the Louvre Meets the Forbidden City won the Top Ten Documentaries Award, and has been named as an Official Selection of the Second Annual Macao, China International Digital Cinema Festivals film competition.
- The Documentary Dunhuang, with Zhou as the Chief Director, was introduced and broadcast by the main media in places such as Japan, Thailand, Hong Kong and Taiwan.
- The documentary The Bund, directed by Zhou, was officially released by CCTV in 2010. Transcending the traditional form of the documentaries, the film not only showed the life in previous Shanghai through recreating the scenes, but also invited celebrities to talk about the vicissitudes of the bund. The film premiered at the Shanghai International Film Festival and aired on the National Geographic Channel. Instead of elaborating on a straight historical timeline of the Bund, the movie is divided into four acts. The first three explore the lives of six individuals, and the last act concludes how their fates have been associated with the ups and downs of the Bund. The film was as appraised to be one of the Classic Works of China TV Documentaries by China Television Artists’ Association, and was also awarded the Special Award of the Outstanding TV Documentaries, and the 29th Session of the "Star and Flower Prize" of the Central New Pictures Group.
- In 2010, Zhou lead the team of The Forbidden City to once again produce a full-length high-definition documentary - A Century with Cars. It was released by CCTV10. A Century with Cars is a full-length documentary on the car and an epic on the evolution of human society. The 12-episode full-length HD TV program was the first film in China regarding the 100-year development history of cars as a clue, reflecting the endeavor of mankind for the ideals. The film was awarded the second prize of the “Record· China” Excellence Comment by China Radio and Television Association.
- At the end of 2013, historical and cultural documentary South of the Ocean, directed by Zhou, was broadcast on CCTV. The shooting of this documentary lasted for five years, and nearly 20,000 minutes of materials were captured in it, showing the development experiences of Chinese people in the Southeast Asian countries and their lives in different periods. South of the Ocean was first shown on the United States History Channel (with coverage in Southeast Asia), and received numerous praise in Southeast Asia. In the ceremony of the "Golden Kapok Award" during the 2013 Guangzhou International Documentary Film Festival, South of the Ocean was awarded the Best Documentary Series Program.
- In 2015, Snow Leopard, a documentary, was played in CCTV-9 Documentary Channel, it was a scheme for natural environment for the first transition of Zhou, the general director who was skilled in human history documentary and made contact with the animal that was the most uncooperative with the shoot. It was awarded as the first prize of the excellence creation review & appraisal (nature) item of the 9th session of "Records. China" by China Alliance of Radio, Film, and Television.
- In 2017, Understanding Asia China: The Legacy Of Cixi directed by Zhou was released on the NewsAsia Channel. Through the eyes of Cixi, the episode examines the influences that have shaped the Chinese people's characteristics through the historical stories of Cixi - the Empress Dowager of the last Chinese dynasty.

== Filmography ==
year	English title	Chinese title	Occupation	notes
1995	Unforgettable	忘不了	writer-director	
1996	Zhou Enlai	周恩来	writer-director	
1997—2000	Memories	《东方时空》特别系列节目《记忆》	chief director	
2000—2004	Oriental Time and Space and Chronicle	《东方时空·纪事》	chief producer	
2003	The Imperial Palace	《故宫》	chief director	
2005	Mei Lanfang	《梅兰芳》	chief director	
2005	Dunhuang	《敦煌》	chief director	
2006	IN SEARCH OF BODHI	大型纪录片《千年菩提路—中国名寺高僧》	chief director	
2007	When the Louvre meets the Forbidden City	《当卢浮宫遇见紫禁城》	chief director	
2008	The Emperor’s Secret Garden	中英合拍高清纪录片（《皇帝的秘密花园》）	director	
2008	Documentary Film, People are the Most Supreme-Documentary of 5·12 Wenchuan Earthquake	纪录电影《人民至上——5·12大地震纪实》	planner	
2008	Homeland	《家园》	planner	
2009	The Bund	2009年系列高清纪录片《外滩》及纪录电影《外滩佚事》	chief director	
2009	National Palace Museum in Taipei	《台北故宫》	chief director	
2010	Yellow Emperor	《黄帝》	chief director	
2010	Traditional Chinese Medicine	《中医》	chief director	
2010	A century with cars	《汽车百年》	chief director	
2010	The Huangpu Military Academy	《黄埔军校》	producer	
2013	South of the Ocean	《下南洋》	chief director	
2014	Trade War	《商战》	chief director	
2014	A Century With Nanjing	《百年南京》	chief director	
2015	Snow Leopard	《雪豹》	chief director	
2017	Understanding Asia China:The Legacy Of Cixi	《理解亚洲：慈禧的遗产》	chief director	

== Published works ==
year	English title	Publisher	Occupation	notes
2005	The Imperial Palace	Published by Forbidden City Press	Chief Editor	
2008	KunQu (Kun Opera) of Six Centuries	Published by China Youth Publishing House	Chief Editor	
2008	Cinematic Record-Mei Lanfang	Published by Contemporary China Publishing House	Chief Editor	
2009	National Palace Museum in Taipei	Published by Jincheng Publishing House	Author	
2010	Dunhuang	Published by Communication University of China Press	Associate Editor	
2011	Eminent Monks of Chinese Famous Temples- Bodhi Road of A Thousand Years	Published by International Culture Publishing Company	Author	
To be published	Where do Records Start	Renmin University of China Press	Author	

== Awards ==
Time Awarded	Awards
1996	Special Award from Documentary Academic Committee, Five-One Project Award (National Level)
1996	Special Award in China Golden Eagle TV Festival (National Level)
1997	Second Level Award from China Documentary Academic Committee
2002	“Magnolia” Best Documentary Award in Shanghai International TV Festival (International Level)
2004-2005	The Imperial Palace was awarded as Best Writing for China Full-length TV Documentaries, and Top 10 China Full-length Documentaries
2005-2006	Be awarded China Film and TV Award by SARFT ( The State Administration of Radio, Film, and Television) of China (National Level)
2005	“Golden Panda” Award and Best Cinematography Award for Best Full-length Documentary on Humanities and Social Science in the 8th Sichuan International TV Festival (International Level)
2006	The documentary of The Imperial Palace was awarded Best Writer-Director and Best Cinematography of the 23rd China TV “Golden Eagle” for Documentaries (National Level)
2006	The documentary of Mei Lanfang was awarded Full-length Documentary Award at the 23rd Golden Eagle Festival
2006	Be awarded Academic Award and Top 10 Documentary Award of the 11th China TV Documentaries
2006	Be awarded the title of “Top 10 Documentaries” and Single Music and Sound Award in Picture-choosing Meeting of International Documentaries held by Radio and Television Association
2006	Be awarded the annual award for Film and TV Works, China Film and TV “Academy Award” from China Institutions of Higher Education Film and TV Association (National Level)
2006	In the annual activity for selection of the director of “Real China” 2005-2006 held by Documentary Work Committee of China Association of Radio and Television, the Documentary Channel of Shanghai Wenguang News Media Group, was awarded as the title of Annual Best Director of “Real China”.
2007	The documentaries of The Imperial Palace and Mei Lanfang were awarded Classic Award for 20 Years of Chinese Documentary Films 1987-2007 (National Level)
2007-2008	National Palace Museum in Taipei was awarded Top 10 Works Award for the series of China TV documentary 2008-2009 in “Humanities in China” Documentary Forum
2008	The documentary of KunQu (Kun Opera) of Six Centenaries was awarded Excellent Documentary Award at the 24th TV Golden Eagle Festival 2008 (National Level)
2009	The full-length documentary Dunhuang was awarded “Golden Panda” Award and Special Jury Award on Humanities in Sichuan International TV Festival (International Level)
2009	China Documentaries·2009 was awarded First Level Award for Excellent Program from Documentary Work Committee of China Association of Radio and Television
2009	National Palace Museum in Taipei was awarded the title of the 3rd “China Documentary” Golden Prize held by Documentary Work Committee of China Association of Radio and Television in 2009
2010	Be selected in China Documentary 2010 of Report of Development Research of China's Documentaries 2010
2010	Be awarded TV Literature and Art Special Program Award of the 21st "Starlight" Award 2010 (National Level)
2010	In 2010, the documentary of The Imperial Palace was awarded "Top 10 Documentary in 10 Years" Award during the period from 2000 to 2010 (National Level)
2010	The HD documentary with 12 episodes of National Palace Museum in Taipei was awarded Special Award of the 21st "Starlight" Award. (National Level)
2010	The HD documentary with 5 episodes of The Bund was awarded the title of "Works 2010 of China TV Documentary" in the award ceremony for China TV Documentary.
2010	Anecdote of the Bund was awarded "Starlight" Award of the 22nd TV Literature and Art Documentary Award (National Level) by Xinying Group.
2010	Anecdote of the Bund was awarded "Xinhua" Award of the 28th TV Literature and Art Special Program Award.
2010	Anecdote of the Bund was selected in China Documentary Works 2010 of Report of Development Research of China's Documentaries 2010
2010	Anecdote of the Bund was selected as the opening film for "Shanghai International Documentary Award Exhibition" in Shanghai TV Festival 2010.
2009	When Louvre Meeting with The Forbidden City was awarded First Level Award of the 5th "China Documentary".
2009	The HD documentary with 12 episodes of When Louvre Meeting with The Forbidden City was awarded the 22nd China TV Literature and Art Documentary Award of "Starlight" Award.
2009	The HD documentary with 12 episodes of When Louvre Meeting with The Forbidden City was awarded the 29th Special Jury Award of "Xinghua" Award by Xinying Group.
2010	When Louvre Meeting with The Forbidden City was selected in Best Director Award.
2010	When Louvre Meeting with The Forbidden City was selected in Works 2010 of China Documentary of Report of Development Research of China's Documentaries 2010.
2010	Be awarded the title of “Top 10 Works of series of China TV Documentaries 2010” in the award ceremony of China TV documentaries
2010	Be awarded the title of “Annual Celebrity for China TV Documentaries 2010” by China TV Artist Association, TV Documentary Academic Committee in 2010
2013	Instinct of Decoding was awarded Golden Panda Award, CCTV-Documentary Award of Energetic China in Sichuan International Documentary Festival 2013.
2013	Going to Southeast Asia was awarded the “Series of Best Documentary Award” of Golden Hongmian Award in Guangzhou International Documentary Festival. [3]
2013	Going to Southeast Asia was awarded First Level Award of Xinghua Award.
2013	Dazu Rock Carvings was awarded Second Level Award of Xinghua Award by Xinying Group.
