= Əspərəsti =

- Location within Azerbaijan
- Coordinates: 41°16′N 48°42′E
- Country: Azerbaijan
- Rayon: Quba
- Municipality: Qorxmazoba
- Time zone: UTC+4 (AZT)
  - Summer (DST): UTC+5 (AZT)

Əspərəsti (also, Əspərasti, Aspərəsti, and Asparasty) is a village in the Quba Rayon of Azerbaijan. The village forms part of the municipality of Qorxmazoba.
