= Houjie Mosque =

Mosque in Tianshui, Gansu, China

- 后街清真寺
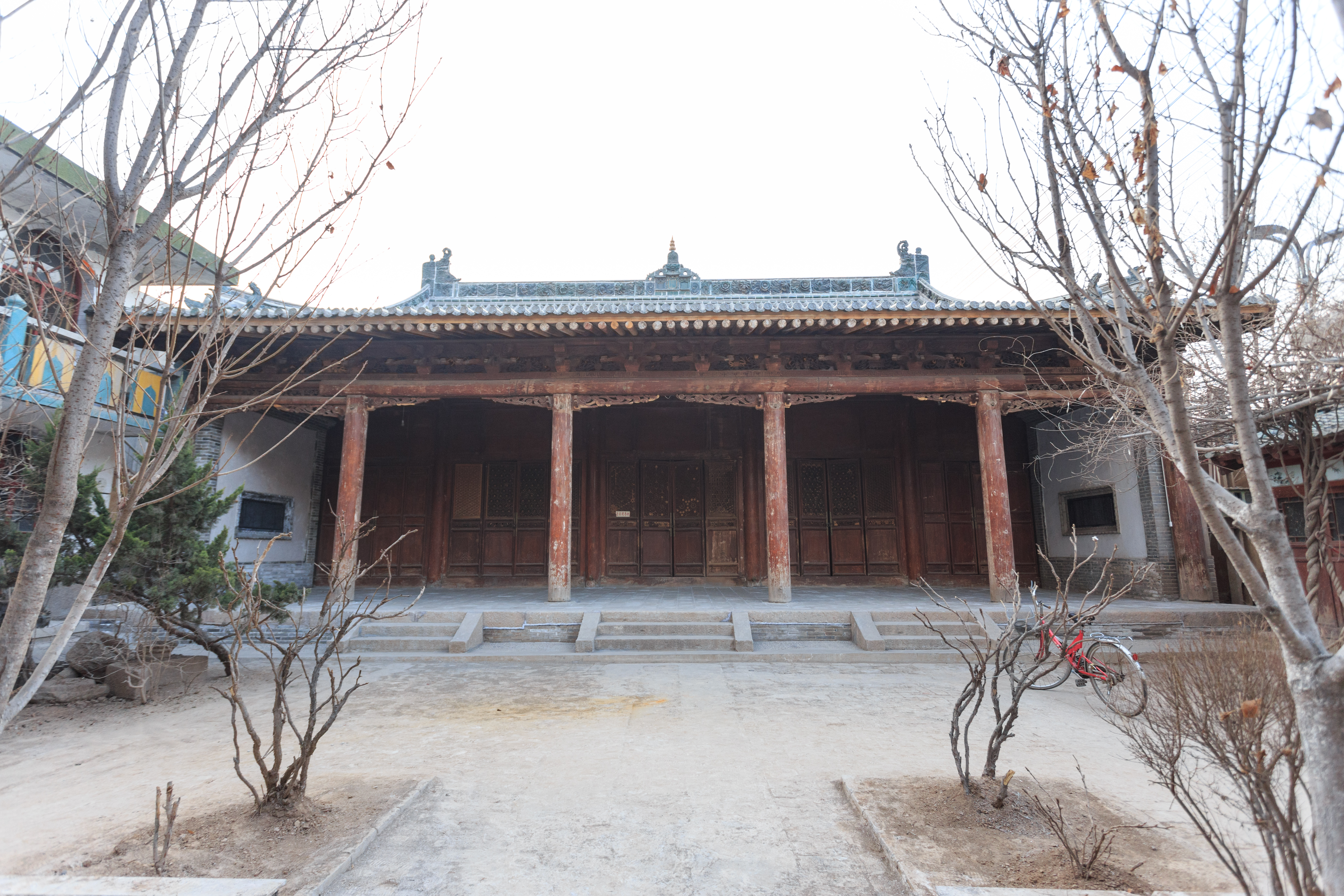

- Location of the mosque in Gansu

Religion
- Affiliation: Sunni Islam
- Ecclesiastical or organizational status: Mosque
- Status: Active

Location
- Location: Qinzhou, Tianshui, Gansu
- Country: China
- Interactive map of Houjie Mosque
- Coordinates: 34°34′58″N 105°43′08″E

Architecture
- Type: Mosque

Major cultural heritage sites under national-level protection
- Official name: Houjie Mosque 后街清真寺
- Designated: 25 May 2006
- Reference no.: 6-0796-3-499

The Houjie Mosque (simplified Chinese: 后街清真寺; traditional Chinese: 後街清真寺; pinyin: Hòujiē Qīngzhēnsì) or Black Street Mosque is a mosque in Qinzhou District, Tianshui City, Gansu, China.

In 2006 the mosque was listed as a Chinese major cultural heritage site.

== See also ==
- Islam in China
- List of mosques in China
