= Dun Huang (TV series) =

2010 Chinese television documentary series

Dun Huang is a documentary television series about the Chinese city of Dunhuang that was released by CCTV in 2010, and directed by Zhou Bing. It mainly introduced the art and history of Dunhuang.

Dunhuang was directed by Zhou Bing following the Forbidden City. It aims to record the developments in the historical and cultural contexts of the Dunhuang region and reveal the in-depth culture of Dunhuang in the past 2000 years. The production team seek to make a documentary which reflects the history and culture of Dunhuang at an all-round dimension.

Dun Huang was first broadcast on News Channel on CCTV, from the first day to the tenth day of the Chinese Lunar New Year. It was broadcast at 21:30 every night and replayed the next morning on 9:10.

It was broadcast again on CCTV on March 19, 2010. It was broadcast on CCTV-1 at 22:30, two episodes every night.

== Broadcasting time ==
=== China Central Television ===
First broadcast on News Channel on CCTV, from the first day to the tenth day of the Chinese Lunar New Year. It was broadcast at 21:30 every night and replayed the next morning on 9:10.

It was broadcast again on CCTV on March 19, 2010. It was broadcast on CCTV-1 at 22:30, two episodes every night.

=== TVB ===
Hong Kong TVB bought this program and broadcast at 10:30 every Sunday night since February 21, 2010. It was replayed on tvb.com. The program was hosted by Bowie Lam.

=== Overseas ===
The programme was bought by National Geographic (America), it was also introduced and broadcast by the main media in countries and areas such as Japan, Thailand, Hong Kong of China and Taiwan of China.

== The topics of each episode ==
- Episode 1
- Episode 2
- Episode 3
- Episode 4
- Episode 5
- Episode 6
- Episode 7
- Episode 8
- Episode 9
- Episode 10
