= Qingyang, Gansu =

City in Gansu, China

Qingyang 庆阳市
- Prefecture-level city
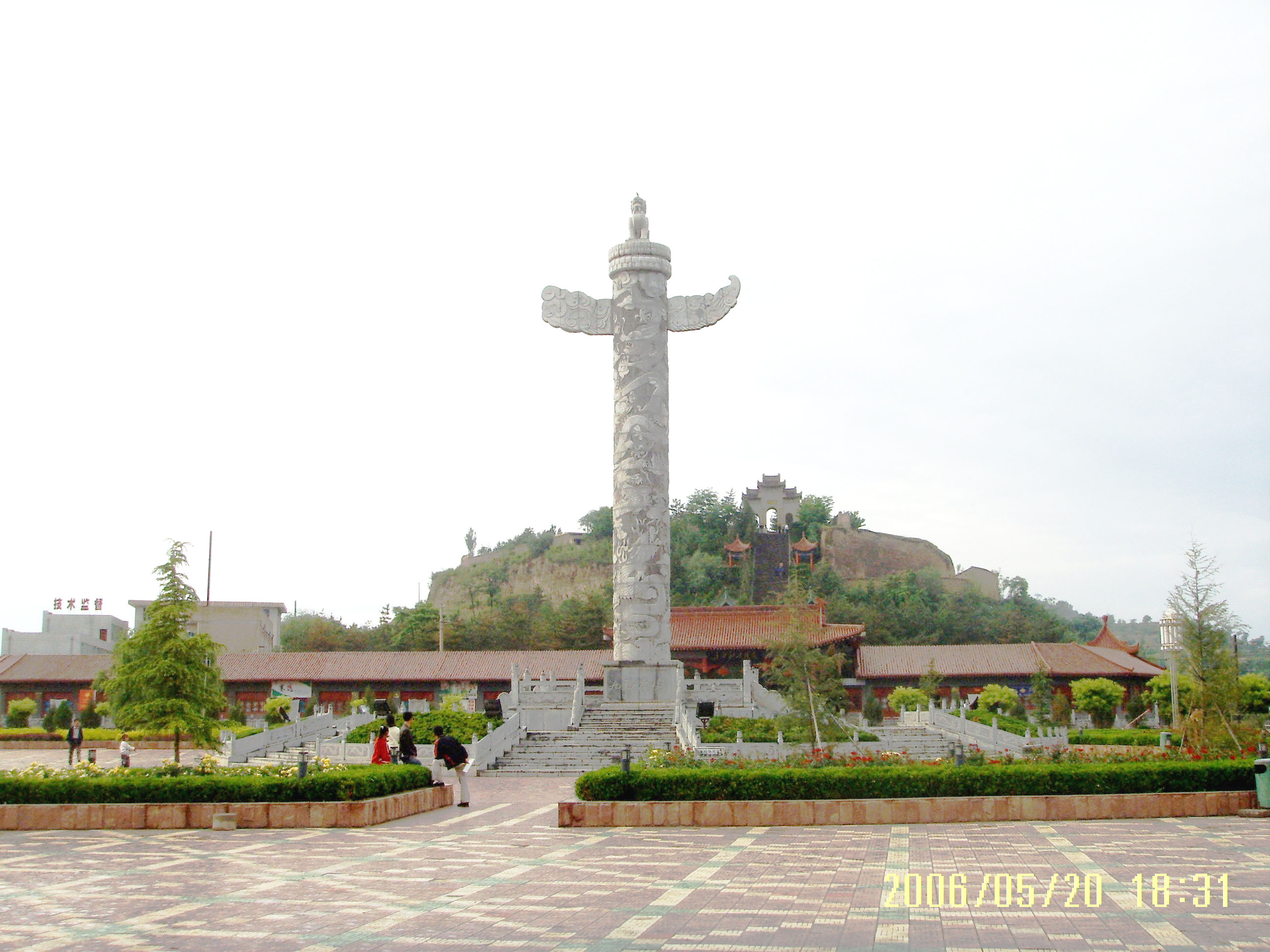

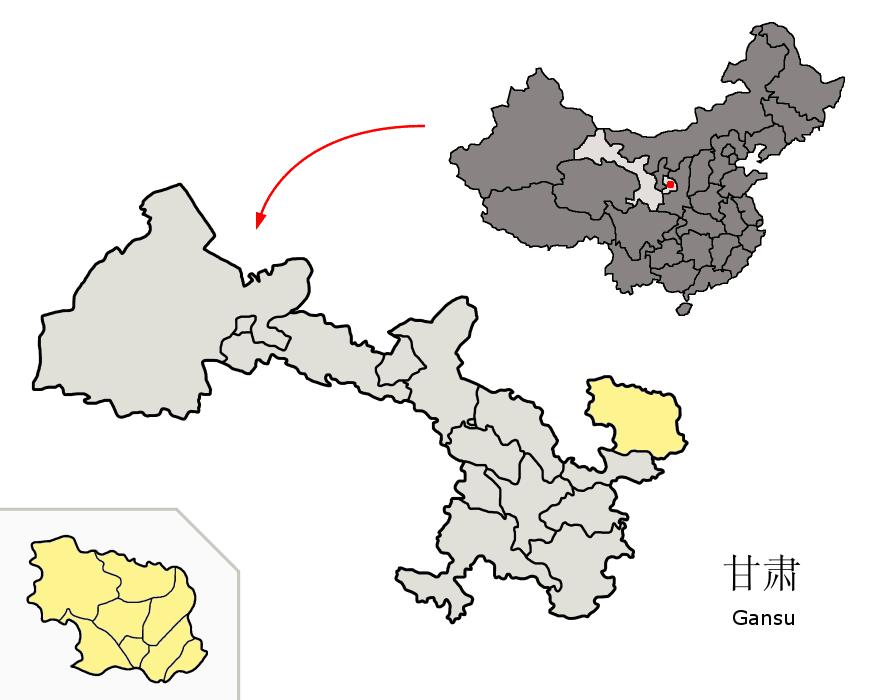
- Location of Qingyang Prefecture within Gansu
- Coordinates (Qingyang municipal government): 35°42′33″N 107°38′37″E
- Country: People's Republic of China
- Province: Gansu
- County-level divisions: 1 district 7 counties
- Township-level divisions: 3 subdistricts 36 towns 79 townships 1 ethnic township
- Village-level divisions: 74 residential communities 1,254 villages
- Municipal seat: Xifeng District

Area
  - Prefecture-level city: 27,119 km^{2} (10,471 sq mi)

Population (2022)
  - Prefecture-level city: 2,158,400
  - Urban: 949,200
  - Rural: 1,209,200

GDP
  - Prefecture-level city: CN¥ 60.9 billion US$ 9.8 billion
  - Per capita: CN¥ 27,366; US$ 4,394
- Time zone: UTC+8 (China Standard)
- Postal code: 745100
- Area code: 0934
- ISO 3166 code: CN-GS-10
- Licence plate prefixes: 甘M
- Administrative division code: 621000
- Website: www.zgqingyang.gov.cn

Qingyang (simplified Chinese: 庆阳; traditional Chinese: 慶陽; pinyin: Qìngyáng) is a prefecture-level city in eastern Gansu province, China.

== Geography and climate ==
Qingyang is the easternmost prefecture-level division of Gansu and is thus sometimes referred to as "Longdong" lit. 'eastern Gansu' (Chinese: 陇东; pinyin: Lǒng dōng). It forms an administrative peninsula, as it is surrounded, on all sides but the south, by Shaanxi and Ningxia. It is along the lower middle part of the Yellow River on the Loess Plateau and is in the eastern Gansu basin. Elevation ranges from 885 to 2082 meters above sea-level. There are 5 major rivers in Qingyang including the Malian (马莲河; pinyin: Mǎliánhé), Pu (蒲河; pinyin: Púhé), Hong (洪河; pinyin: Hóng hé), Silang (四郎河; pinyin: Sìláng hé), and Hulu (葫芦河; pinyin: Húlu hé). Their combined annual flow is more than 800 million cubic meters. Bordering prefecture-level cities are:

Shaanxi:

- Yulin – north
- Yan'an – northeast
- Xianyang – southeast

Gansu:

- Pingliang – south/southwest

Ningxia:

- Guyuan – west
- Wuzhong – northwest

Qingyang has a humid continental climate (Köppen Dwb) with monsoonal influences. The normal monthly mean temperature ranges from −3.8 °C (25.2 °F) in January to 21.9 °C (71.4 °F) in July, with the annual mean standing at 9.8 °C (49.6 °F). The normal annual precipitation is 542.2 mm (21.35 in), 68% of it occurring from June to September, and winter seeing minimal precipitation.

Climate data for Qingyang (Xifeng District), elevation 1,421 m (4,662 ft), (1991–2020 normals, extremes 1951–present)
Month	Jan	Feb	Mar	Apr	May	Jun	Jul	Aug	Sep	Oct	Nov	Dec	Year
Record high °C (°F)	16.2 (61.2)	19.5 (67.1)	26.7 (80.1)	31.6 (88.9)	32.6 (90.7)	35.9 (96.6)	36.4 (97.5)	35.7 (96.3)	33.6 (92.5)	26.5 (79.7)	21.4 (70.5)	16.4 (61.5)	36.4 (97.5)
Mean daily maximum °C (°F)	0.8 (33.4)	4.6 (40.3)	10.6 (51.1)	17.4 (63.3)	21.7 (71.1)	25.7 (78.3)	26.9 (80.4)	25.0 (77.0)	20.1 (68.2)	14.3 (57.7)	8.4 (47.1)	2.5 (36.5)	14.8 (58.7)
Daily mean °C (°F)	−3.8 (25.2)	−0.4 (31.3)	5.2 (41.4)	11.6 (52.9)	16.1 (61.0)	20.3 (68.5)	21.9 (71.4)	20.3 (68.5)	15.5 (59.9)	9.6 (49.3)	3.5 (38.3)	−2.2 (28.0)	9.8 (49.6)
Mean daily minimum °C (°F)	−7.4 (18.7)	−4.1 (24.6)	1.0 (33.8)	6.7 (44.1)	11.2 (52.2)	15.5 (59.9)	17.8 (64.0)	16.6 (61.9)	12.1 (53.8)	6.1 (43.0)	−0.2 (31.6)	−5.8 (21.6)	5.8 (42.4)
Record low °C (°F)	−22.4 (−8.3)	−20.1 (−4.2)	−15.9 (3.4)	−10.0 (14.0)	−0.6 (30.9)	4.3 (39.7)	9.6 (49.3)	6.2 (43.2)	−0.8 (30.6)	−7.3 (18.9)	−16.8 (1.8)	−22.6 (−8.7)	−22.6 (−8.7)
Average precipitation mm (inches)	5.8 (0.23)	8.9 (0.35)	17.6 (0.69)	32.8 (1.29)	46.2 (1.82)	69.2 (2.72)	110.5 (4.35)	104.9 (4.13)	84.1 (3.31)	44.0 (1.73)	14.7 (0.58)	3.5 (0.14)	542.2 (21.34)
Average precipitation days (≥ 0.1 mm)	4.3	5.2	6.5	6.8	8.7	10.1	11.9	12.1	11.4	9.3	5.4	3.0	94.7
Average snowy days	6.7	7.7	5.4	1.1	0	0	0	0	0	0.9	4.1	4.9	30.8
Average relative humidity (%)	52	54	52	50	53	58	69	74	75	70	60	52	60
Mean monthly sunshine hours	187.8	174.7	202.5	228.4	247.0	239.1	228.8	205.9	161.3	172.4	182.0	194.4	2,424.3
Percentage possible sunshine	60	56	54	58	57	55	52	50	44	50	60	65	55
Source: China Meteorological Administration

== History ==
Qingyang was part of the area where the earliest cultures along the Yellow River developed and was part of the heartland of the Qin state that would eventually unite China. It was also an important place in the Chinese Communist Revolution, as a part of the Shaan–Gan–Ning Border Region.

=== Meteor shower ===
In March or April 1490 AD a presumed meteor shower occurred in the Qingyang district. If a meteor shower did occur, it may have been the result of the breakup of an asteroid. At least three surviving Chinese historical records describe a shower during which "stones fell like rain", killing more than 10,000 people. Due to the paucity of detailed information and the lack of surviving meteorites or other physical evidence, researchers have also been unable to definitively state the exact nature of the dramatic event.

== Administration ==
Qingyang has 1 urban district, 7 counties, and 146 towns with a total population of 2,158,400, of which 949,200 live in urban areas.

Map
#	Name	Hanzi	Hanyu Pinyin	Population (2022 est.)	Area (km^{2})	Density (/km^{2})
1	Xifeng District	西峰区	Xīfēng Qū	513,900	996	331
2	Qingcheng County	庆城县	Qìngchéng Xiàn	235,200	2,673	120
3	Huan County	环县	Huán Xiàn	301,700	9,236	37
4	Huachi County	华池县	Huáchí Xiàn	118,300	3,776	34
5	Heshui County	合水县	Héshuǐ Xiàn	134,700	2,976	57
6	Zhengning County	正宁县	Zhèngníng Xiàn	173,200	1,329	173
7	Ning County	宁县	Níng Xiàn	331,700	2,633	197
8	Zhenyuan County	镇原县	Zhènyuán Xiàn	510,000	3,500	146

== Economy ==
In 2022 Qingyang's GDP was 102.226 billion RMB, 4.4 % growth over the previous year. 12.2 % of GDP was generated by the primary sector, 54.0% by the secondary sector and 33.8% by the tertiary sector. The per capita income was 22,878 RMB, for urban residents 37,585 RMB and for rural residents 12,276 RMB.

Petroleum and natural gas are the backbone of Qingyang's economy. Agricultural products include grains, donkeys, Huan County sheep, cattle, dates, milk, apples, apricots and other fruits, vegetables, and berries. 69 different kinds of Chinese medicinal plants and herbs are collected or grown here, 25 of which are exported.

== Transportation ==
- Qingyang Airport
- China National Highway 211
- China National Highway 309
- G22 Qingdao–Lanzhou Expressway
- Xi'an-Pingliang railway (limited service, station at Ning County)

== Culture ==
Qingyang is famous for its rich folk culture. Traditional Chinese art forms such as shadow puppet theater, paper cuts (such as the Qingyang sachet), folk music, and songs are still part of Qingyang's culture.

The local newspaper is called Longdong Daily (Chinese: 陇东报; pinyin: Lǒng dōng bào).
