= Heshui County =

Heshui County 合水县 Hoshui
- County
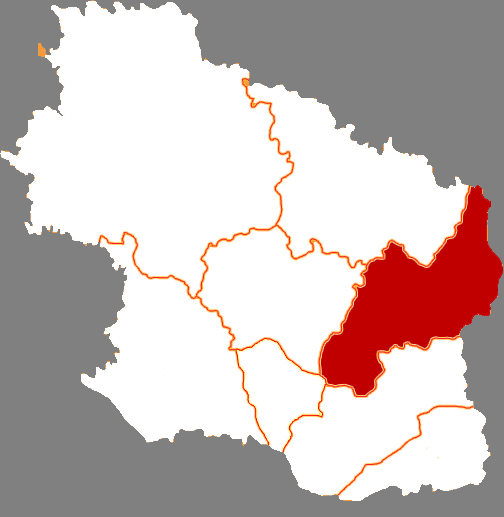
- Heshui in Qingyang

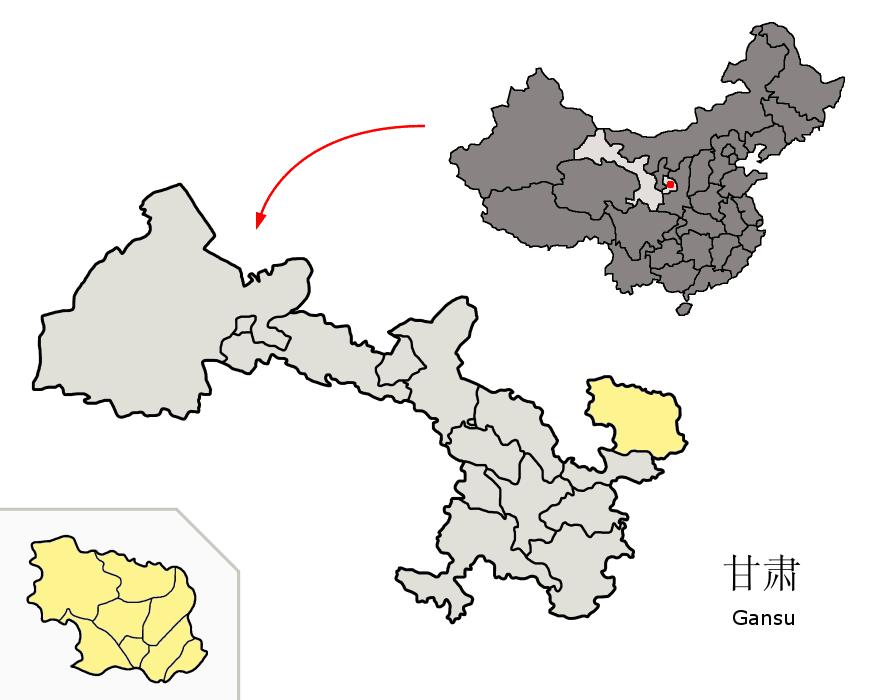
- Qingyang in Gansu
- Coordinates (Heshui government): 35°50′02″N 108°01′19″E
- Country: China
- Province: Gansu
- Prefecture-level city: Qingyang
- County seat: Xihuachi

Area
  - Total: 2,941.78 km^{2} (1,135.83 sq mi)

Population (2023)
  - Total: 133,200
  - Density: 45.28/km^{2} (117.3/sq mi)
- Time zone: UTC+8 (China Standard)
- Postal code: 745400

Heshui County (Chinese: 合水县; pinyin: Héshuǐ Xiàn) is a county of Gansu province, China. It is under the administration of the prefecture-level city of Qingyang, and is the easternmost county-level division of the province.

Its postal code is 745400, and its population in 2023 was 133,200 people.

== History ==
Heshui was known as Lepan (乐蟠) in the Sui dynasty (617 AD), and later as Pan County, Panjiao County after 623 AD, and Hechuan County. In 742 it was named Heshui.

=== Yellow River elephant ===
In January 1973, remains of an elephant were discovered by several farmers on the bank of the Malian River in Banqiao township, Heshui County. The elephant remains measured 4 meters tall, 8 meters long, with tusks of over 2 meters long, resembling two long swords, hence it was also called a saber-toothed elephant. The fossilized skeleton of the Yellow River elephant, is the most complete saber-toothed skeleton ever found in the world. Because this fossil was found in the Yellow River area, it was named "Yellow River Elephant". However, after further analysis of the fossil of the Yellow River elephant and comparison it with other ancient elephants, paleontologists discovered that it was actually a Stegodon zdanskyi. It is believed that more than 3000 years ago, "large populations of Asian elephants still roamed the forests along the Yellow River."

=== Qin highway ===
Remains of the Qin dynasty highway passing through Heshui County have been found.

== Economy ==
Heshui has large coal and oil reserves. Agricultural output includes grains, corn, potatoes, soybeans, oilseeds, melons, vegetables, apples, white melon seeds, wood ear mushroom, morels, and deer antler velvet.

== Administrative divisions ==
Heshui County is divided to 8 towns and 4 townships. Since 1952 the county government is seated in Xihuachi town.

Towns

- Xihuachi (西华池镇)
- Laocheng (老城镇)
- Taibai (太白镇)
- Banqiao (板桥镇)
- Hejiapan (何家畔镇)
- Jixian (吉岘镇)
- Xiaozui (肖咀镇)
- Gucheng (固城镇)

Townships

- Duanjiaji Township (段家集乡)
- Tai'e Township (太莪乡)
- Dianzi Township (店子乡)
- Haozuipu Township (蒿咀铺乡)

== Climate ==
Climate data for Heshui, elevation 1,274 m (4,180 ft), (1991–2020 normals, extremes 1981–2010)
Month	Jan	Feb	Mar	Apr	May	Jun	Jul	Aug	Sep	Oct	Nov	Dec	Year
Record high °C (°F)	15.1 (59.2)	20.8 (69.4)	26.9 (80.4)	33.3 (91.9)	33.4 (92.1)	36.5 (97.7)	35.8 (96.4)	33.4 (92.1)	33.7 (92.7)	26.7 (80.1)	21.0 (69.8)	14.8 (58.6)	36.5 (97.7)
Mean daily maximum °C (°F)	1.2 (34.2)	5.3 (41.5)	11.6 (52.9)	18.4 (65.1)	22.7 (72.9)	26.7 (80.1)	27.8 (82.0)	26.0 (78.8)	21.0 (69.8)	15.1 (59.2)	8.8 (47.8)	2.7 (36.9)	15.6 (60.1)
Daily mean °C (°F)	−4.2 (24.4)	−0.4 (31.3)	5.4 (41.7)	11.9 (53.4)	16.3 (61.3)	20.4 (68.7)	22.1 (71.8)	20.6 (69.1)	15.7 (60.3)	9.6 (49.3)	3.2 (37.8)	−2.7 (27.1)	9.8 (49.7)
Mean daily minimum °C (°F)	−8.7 (16.3)	−4.9 (23.2)	0.3 (32.5)	6.2 (43.2)	10.5 (50.9)	14.9 (58.8)	17.4 (63.3)	16.3 (61.3)	11.7 (53.1)	5.4 (41.7)	−1.2 (29.8)	−7.1 (19.2)	5.1 (41.1)
Record low °C (°F)	−18.8 (−1.8)	−16.6 (2.1)	−13.9 (7.0)	−4.8 (23.4)	0.2 (32.4)	7.2 (45.0)	10.9 (51.6)	8.1 (46.6)	1.9 (35.4)	−8.1 (17.4)	−16.8 (1.8)	−23.0 (−9.4)	−23.0 (−9.4)
Average precipitation mm (inches)	6.0 (0.24)	8.5 (0.33)	16.6 (0.65)	34.3 (1.35)	47.8 (1.88)	67.9 (2.67)	124.8 (4.91)	114.8 (4.52)	84.9 (3.34)	45.3 (1.78)	15.4 (0.61)	3.7 (0.15)	570 (22.43)
Average precipitation days (≥ 0.1 mm)	4.2	5.0	6.2	7.1	9.4	10.4	12.7	12.6	12.0	9.7	5.5	3.0	97.8
Average snowy days	5.8	6.5	4.7	0.8	0	0	0	0	0	0.6	3.7	4.6	26.7
Average relative humidity (%)	55	55	52	50	54	60	71	76	77	73	63	56	62
Mean monthly sunshine hours	181.6	172.9	202.0	226.6	246.8	234.4	227.0	201.8	160.9	167.9	171.8	184.0	2,377.7
Percentage possible sunshine	58	56	54	57	56	54	52	49	44	49	56	61	54
Source: China Meteorological Administration

== Transportation ==
- China National Highway 211
- China National Highway 309

== See also ==
- List of administrative divisions of Gansu
