= Values (heritage) =

Criteria defining heritage significance

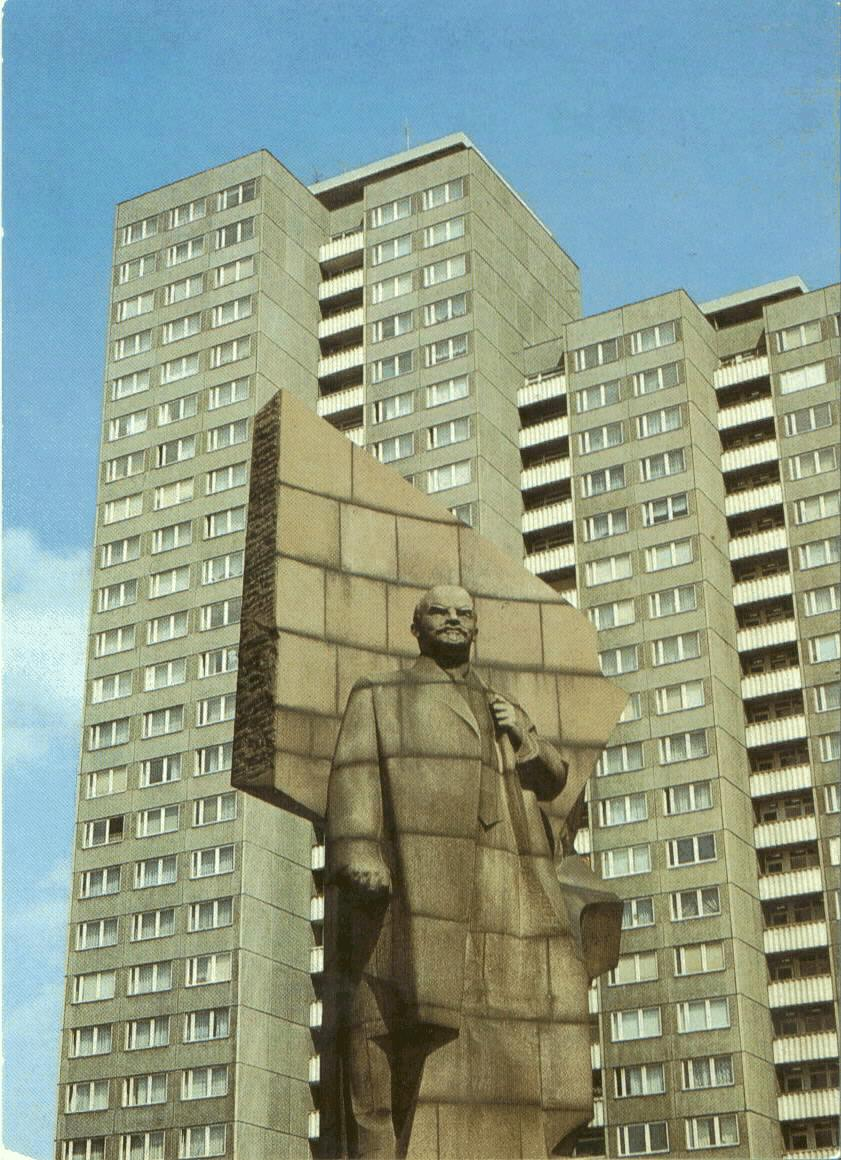
Changing values saw the demolition and burial of this monument in 1991; in 2010 it was announced that the head was to be excavated and placed in a museum for disgraced statues

The values embodied in cultural heritage are identified in order to assess significance, prioritize resources, and inform conservative-restorative decision-making. It is recognised that values may compete and change over time, and that heritage may have different meanings for different stakeholders.

== Origins ==
Alois Riegl is credited with developing Ruskin's concept of 'voicefulness' into a systematic categorization of the different values of a monument. In his 1908 essay Der moderne Denkmalkultus (The modern cult of monuments), he describes historical value, artistic value, age value, commemorative value, use value, and newness value. Riegl demonstrates that some of these values conflict and argues that they may be culturally contingent.

== Charters and Conventions ==
The UNESCO World Heritage Convention addresses cultural sites of outstanding universal value, from a historical, aesthetic, scientific, ethnological or anthropological perspective, and highlights the need for authenticity. Discussed in the 1964 Venice Charter, values and the question 'why conserve?' are the focus of the 1979 Burra Charter (last revised 1999). Cultural significance is said to be 'embodied' in the fabric, setting, use, associations, and meanings of a place, and includes aesthetic, historic, scientific, social and spiritual values for past, present and future generations. In order to preserve such values a 'cautious approach' of minimum intervention is advocated.

== Practice ==
Significance assessment typically includes consideration of the rarity, representativeness, and communicative power of assets and their values. These are then managed in order to sustain and valorize that significance. Engagement with the economic value of heritage may help promote its preservation. Development of new representation technologies such as Digital Twin has the potential to help the community perceive the values and also help the community engage in the curation and dissemination of the architectural heritage with an increased level of accessibility.

== See also ==
- World Heritage Site
- Cultural heritage management
- Conservation-restoration
- Value pluralism
- Intrinsic value (ethics)
- Collective memory
