= Tiantishan Caves =

Buddhist site in Wuwei, Gansu, China

Coordinates: 37°33′44″N 102°44′41″E

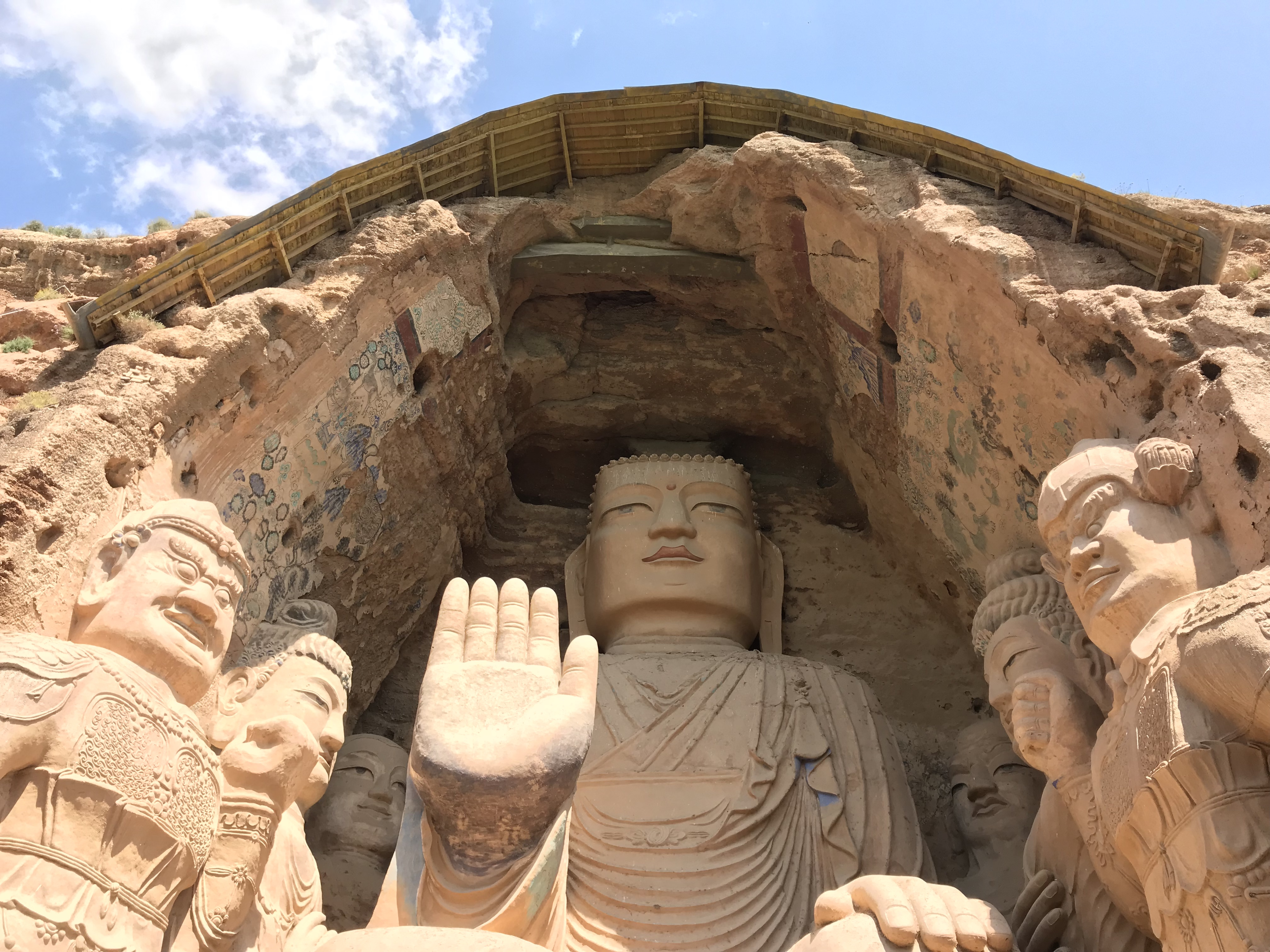
Monumental Sakyamuni Buddha and attendant figures from the Tiantishan Grottoes

The Tiantishan Caves (Chinese: 天梯山石窟; pinyin: Tiāntīshān shíkū) are a series of rock cut Buddhist cave temples in the Liangzhou District of Wuwei, Gansu, northwest China. Excavated from the eastern cliffs of the Huangyang River (黃羊河) in the Qilian Mountains from the time of the Northern Liang, carving, decoration and subsequent modification of the caves continued through the Northern Wei and Tang to the Qing dynasty. The complex is identified with the Liangzhou Caves opened during the time of Juqu Mengxun "one hundred li to the south of Liangzhou", as recorded in the Spring and Autumn Annals of the Sixteen Kingdoms and Fayuan Zhulin. The name Tiantishan consists of three Chinese characters (天梯山) that literally translate as "Ladder to Heaven Mountain".

== Caves ==
The Tang monk Daoxuan in his Ji shenzhou sanbao gantong lu ascribes the opening of Tiantishan to the Xiongnu king of Northern Liang Juqu Mengxun's devotion to "meritorious deeds" alongside his desire to avoid the impermanence of the city by fashioning caves from the mountains. Contrary to the account in the Wei Shu of monks and Buddhist teachers relocating to the east after the conquest of the Northern Liang by the Northern Wei and subsequent persecution, structural, iconographic, and stylistic analysis shows that activity at the site continued. A total of nineteen caves in three tiers have been identified:

Cave	Construction	Modifications	Type
Cave 1	Northern Liang	Northern Wei, Tang (beginning, early, mid, and late), Western Xia, Yuan, Ming, Qing	central pillar
Cave 2	beginning of the Tang	early Tang, Western Xia, Ming	square
Cave 3	beginning of the Tang	Western Xia, Ming	square
Cave 4	Northern Liang	Northern Wei, Tang (early and mid), Western Xia, Yuan, Ming, Qing	central pillar
Cave 5	uncertain	uncertain	
Cave 6	uncertain	Tang, Ming, Qing	square
Cave 7	Northern Wei	Northern Zhou, Western Xia, Yuan, Ming	square
Cave 8	Northern Wei	Northern Zhou, Sui, Tang (early and mid), Song, Ming	square
Cave 9	Tang	Ming	square
Cave 10	uncertain	uncertain	
Cave 11	uncertain	uncertain	
Cave 12	uncertain	uncertain	
Cave 13	Tang	Western Xia, Yuan, Ming, Qing	
Cave 14	Tang	Western Xia, Yuan, Ming	
Cave 15	Northern Liang to Northern Wei	Western Xia, Yuan, Ming	
Cave 16	Northern Wei	Western Xia, Yuan	
Cave 17	Northern Liang to Northern Wei	Sui, Tang (mid), Western Xia, Yuan, Ming	
Cave 18	Northern Liang	Northern Wei, Tang (late), Western Xia, Yuan, Ming, Qing	central pillar
Cave 19	uncertain	uncertain	square

== Later history ==
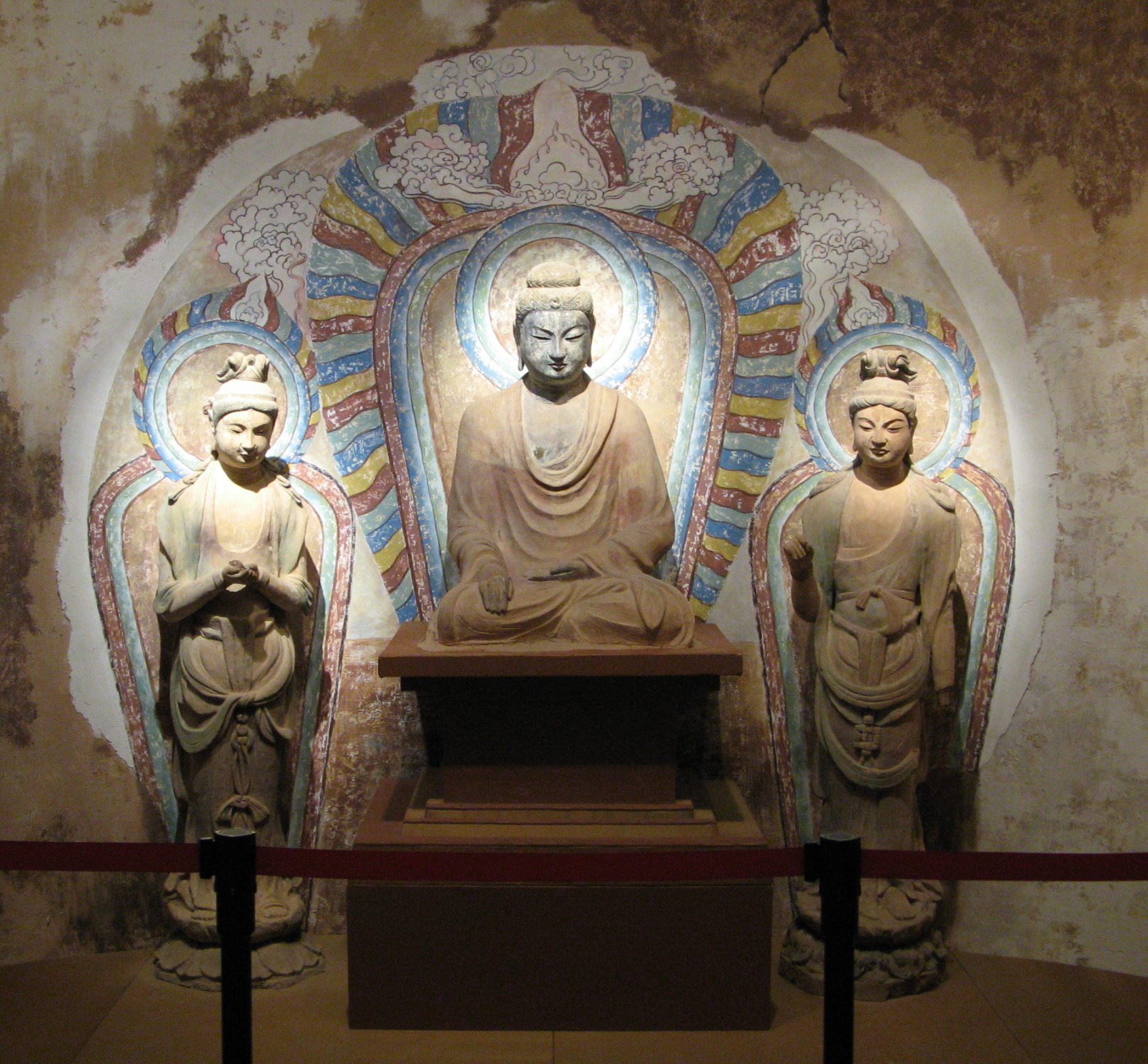
Buddha Triad of the Tang dynasty from Tiantishan at Gansu Provincial Museum

Tiantishan disappeared from the historical record after the Tang dynasty. While decoration and modification of the caves continued into the Qing dynasty, five suffered from collapse over the centuries, exacerbated by an earthquake in 1927. Despite initial survey in the early 1950s demonstrating the importance of the site, in April 1959 the Gansu provincial government approved the construction of a reservoir that would flood two of the three tiers of caves when commissioned in May the following year. In the interval, a research team from the Dunhuang Academy and Gansu Provincial Museum documented the site and excavated the collapsed caves, although all the written records and colour photographs and most of the black-and-white photographs have since been lost, along with most of the copies of the wall paintings. Some 50 square metres (540 sq ft) of the paintings were detached, although the colours have since "faded after 40 years of natural weathering", and other than for the largest, most of the sculptures were taken down and removed to the Museum. In 2001, in recognition of their significance as one of the earliest Buddhist grotto sites in the country, the Tiantishan Caves were designated a Major Historical and Cultural Site Protected at the National Level by SACH.

== See also ==
- Major National Historical and Cultural Sites (Gansu)
- Principles for the Conservation of Heritage Sites in China
- Detachment of wall paintings
- Mogao Caves
