= Maijishan Grottoes =

Caves in Gansu, China

Coordinates: 34°21′08″N 106°00′10″E

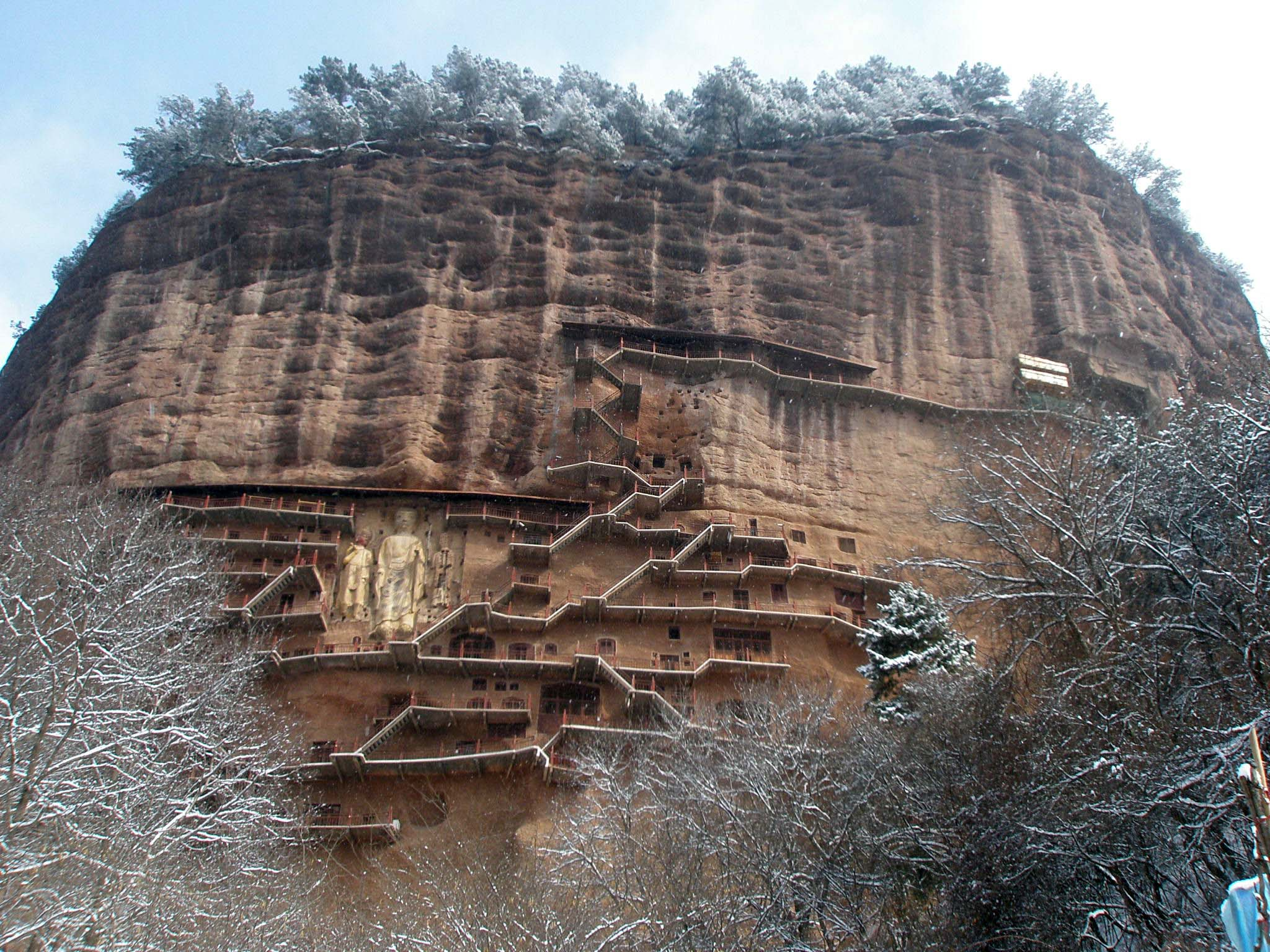
View of Maijishan hill caves, grottoes and stairways

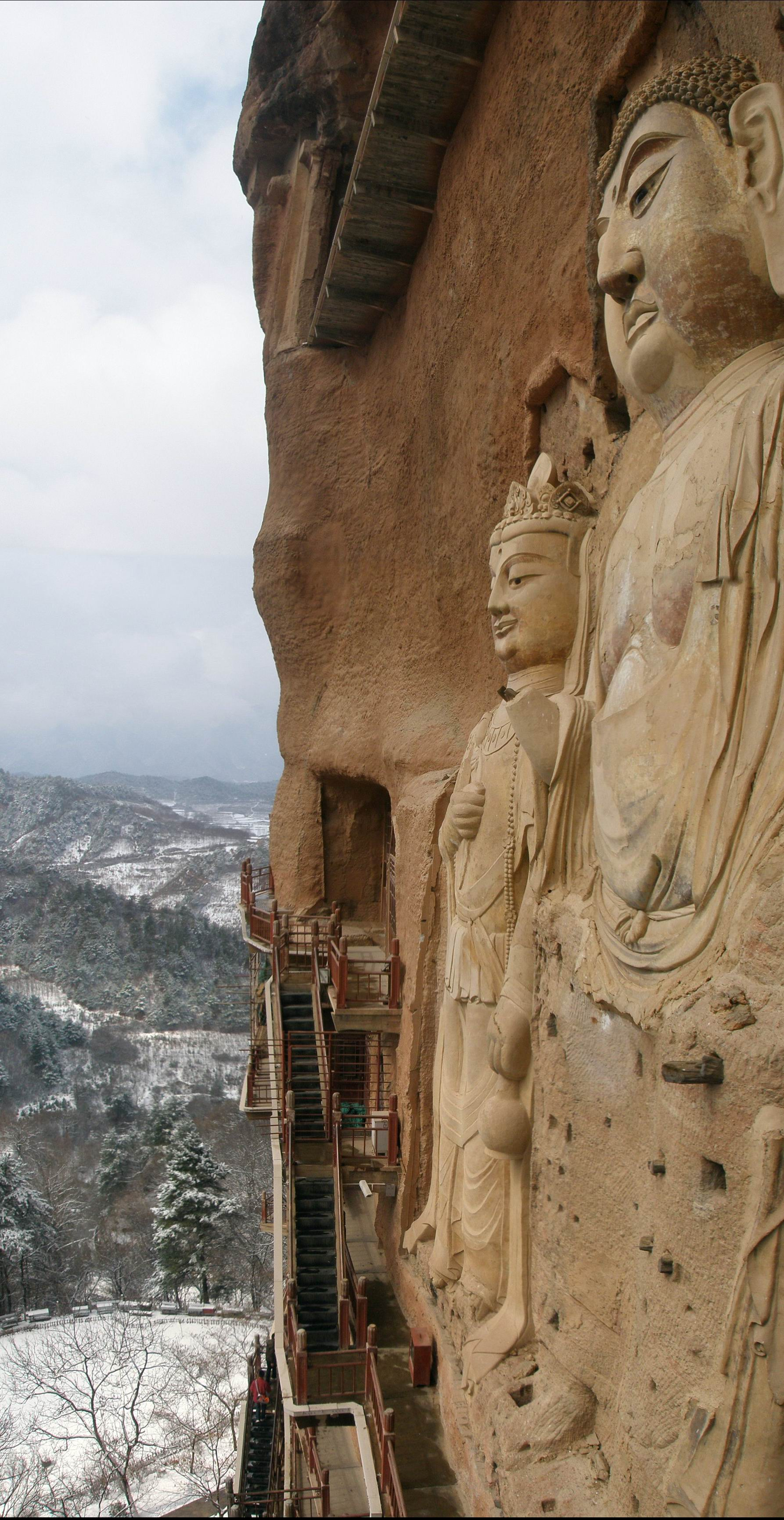
Huge Bodhisattva sculptures at Maijishan

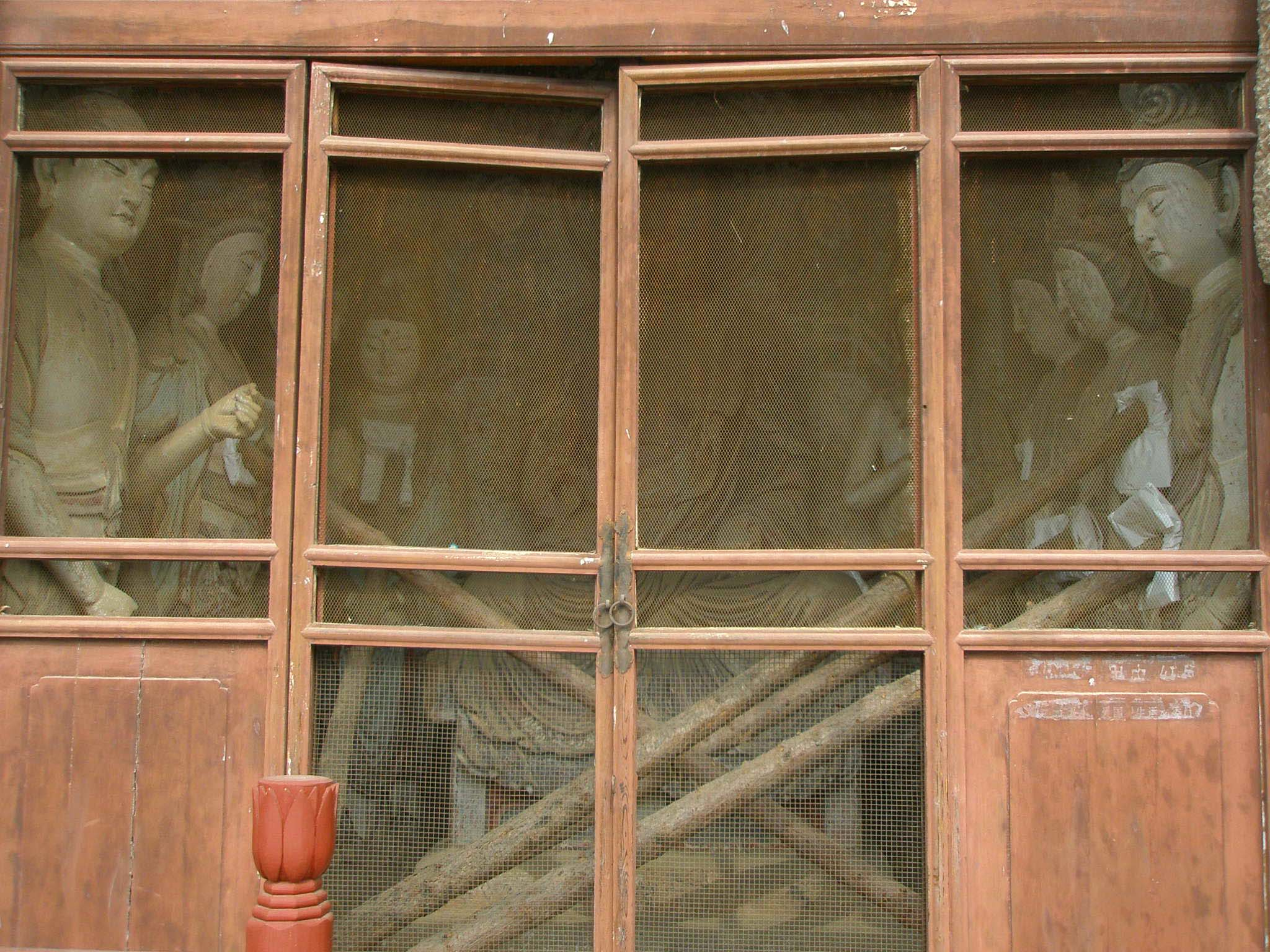
Sculptures in one of the Maijishan grottoes supported by tree trunks

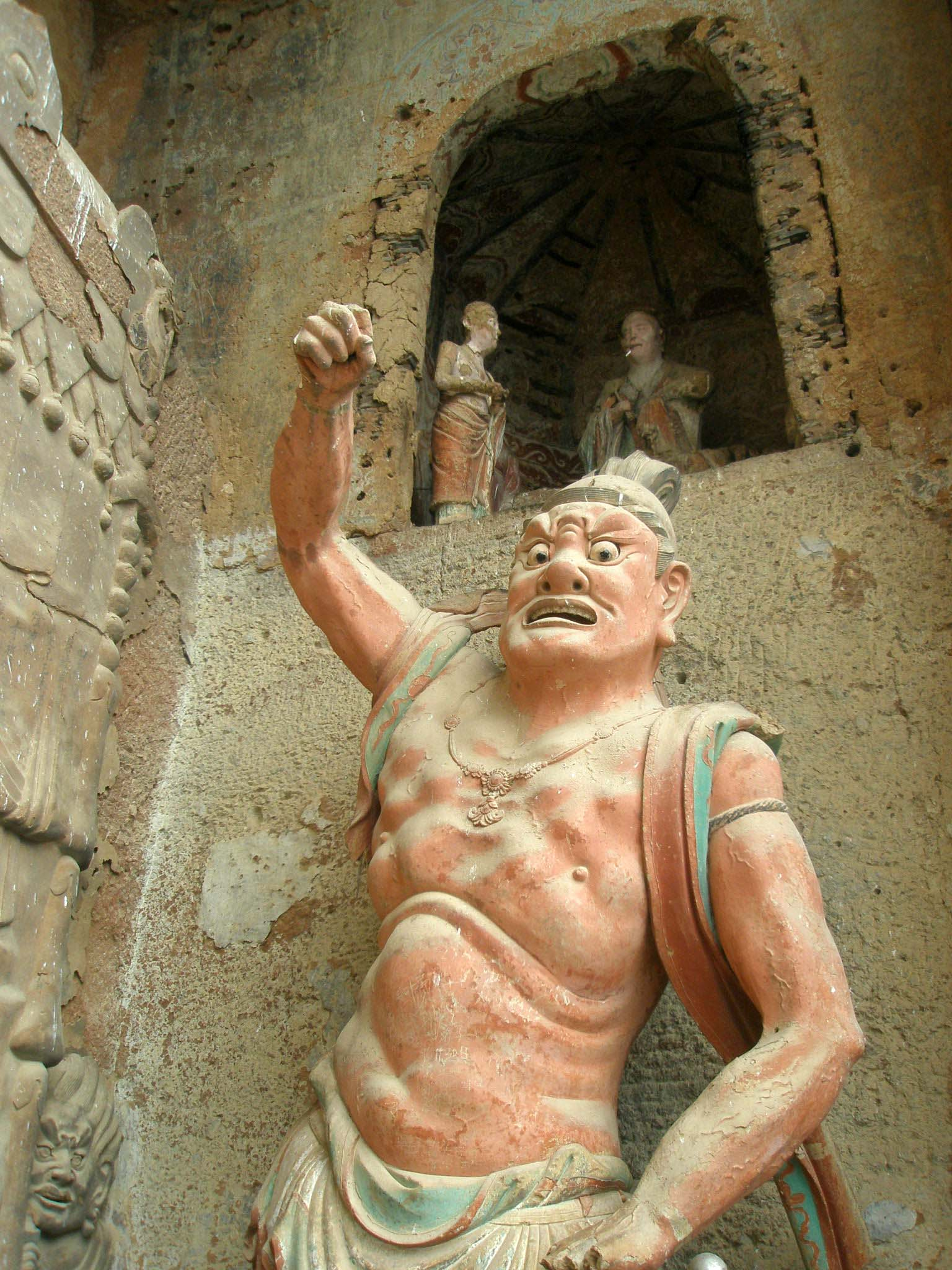
Well preserved painted sculptures can be found in many of the grottoes

The Maijishan Grottoes (simplified Chinese: 麦积山石窟; traditional Chinese: 麥積山石窟; pinyin: Màijīshān Shíkū), formerly romanized as Maichishan, are a series of 194 rock-cut caves cut into the Maijishan hill in Tianshui, Gansu Province, northwest China. They contain over 7,200 Buddhist sculptures and over 1,000 square meters of murals.

The name Maijishan consists of three Chinese words (麦积山): mai (麦) is the generic term for most grains, ji (积) means "stack" or "mound", and shan (山) means "mountain". Maijishan is often translated as "wheatstack mountain" or "corn rick mountain".

The mountain is formed of purplish red sandstone. Construction of the grottoes began in the Later Qin era (384–417 CE). A team of Chinese archeologists from Beijing conducted the first modern exploration in 1952–53. They devised the numbering system still in use today. Caves #1–50 are on the western cliff face, while caves #51–191 on the eastern cliff face. The grottoes were later photographed by Michael Sullivan and Dominique Darbois, who subsequently published the primary English-language work on the caves noted in the footnotes below.

The Maijishan Grottoes are just one of the string of Buddhist grottoes that can be found in this area of northwest China, lying more or less on the main routes connecting China and Central Asia. These sites, along with other archeological sites along the eastern Silk Road, were inscribed on the UNESCO World Heritage List in 2014 as part of the "Silk Roads: the Routes Network of Chang'an-Tianshan Corridor" site.

== History ==
Maijishan is located close to the east–west route that connects Xi'an with Lanzhou and eventually Dunhuang, as well as the route that veers off to the south that connects Xi'an with Chengdu in Sichuan and regions as far south as India. At this crossroads, several of the sculptures in Maijishan from around the 6th century appear to have Indian—and SE Asian—features that could have come north via these north–south routes. The earliest artistic influence came, however, from the northwest, through Central Asia along the Silk Road. Later, during the Song and Ming Dynasties, as the caves were renovated and repaired, the influences came from central and eastern China and the sculpture is more distinctly Chinese.

Cave shrines in China probably served two purposes: originally, before Buddhism came to China, they may have been used as local shrines to worship one's ancestors or various nature deities. With the coming of Buddhism to China, however, influenced by the long tradition of cave shrines from India (such as Ajanta) and Central Asia (primarily Afghanistan), they became part of China's religious architecture.

Buddhism in this part of China spread through the support of the Later Qin dynasty (384–417), one of the "Sixteen Kingdoms" that existed from 304 to 439 CE—a collection of numerous short-lived sovereign states in China. The Later Qin was ruled by the Qiang people, and their second ruler, Yao Xing, was a fervent believer of Buddhism who heavily promoted the religion to his subjects. The construction of the Maijishan Grottoes most likely began under his reign. The grottoes were later controlled by the Xianbei-led Western Qin dynasty (385–431), who showed interest in Buddhism themselves, as evidenced by their construction of another series of Buddhist grottoes, the Bingling Temple.

Sometime between 420 and 422 CE, a monk by the name of Tanhung arrived at Maijishan and proceeded to build a small monastic community. One of the legends is that he had previously been living in Chang'an but had fled to Maijishan when the city was invaded by the Sung army. Within a few years he was joined by another senior monk, Xuangao, who brought 100 followers to the mountain. Both are recorded in a book entitled Memoirs of Eminent Monks; eventually their community grew to 300 members. Xuangao later moved to the court of the local king where he remained until its conquest by the Northern Wei, when he, together with all the other inhabitants of the court, were forced to migrate and settle in the Wei capital. He died in 444 during a period of Buddhist persecution. Tanhung also left Maijishan during this period and travelled south, to somewhere in Cochin China, when in approximately 455, he burned himself to death.

It is not known how the original community was organized or looked. "Nor is there any evidence to show whether the settlement they founded was destroyed and its members scattered in the suppression of 444 and the ensuring years, or whether it was saved by its remoteness to become a haven of refuge, as was to happen on several later occasions in the history of Maijishan".

The Northern Wei was good to Maijishan and the grottoes existence close to the Wei capital city of Luoyang and the main road west brought the site recognition and, most likely, support. The earliest dated inscription is from 502, and records the excavation of what is now identified as Cave 115. Other inscriptions record the continued expansion of the grottoes, as works were dedicated by those with the financial means to do so.

== Design ==
These Wei caves are fairly simple and most follow the pattern of a seated Buddha flanked by bodhisattvas and other attendants, sometimes by monks or lay worshippers. The most common Buddha is Amitābha, the principal Buddha of the Pure Land sect. Amitābha enables all who call upon him to be reborn into his heaven, the "Pure Land". There they undergo instruction by him ultimately to become bodhisattvas and buddhas in their own right. This was a very popular school of Mahayana Buddhism during this period.

The bodhisattvas who accompany him are usually Avalokitesvara on the Buddha's right, and Mahasthamaprapta on his left. Avalokitesvara can be identified by his headdress which holds a small image of the Buddha Amitābha, and the fact that he often carries a small water flask. Sometimes he holds a heart-shaped, or pippala-leaf shaped object (which art historians still can't positively identify). Mahasthamaprapta is slightly more difficult to identify, but this is the usual pairing with Avalokitesvara (who will, in a few hundred more years, change gender and morph into the Goddess or Bodhisattva of Mercy, Guanyin).

The monks are usually the two most famous associated with the historical Buddha: the younger Ananda, and the older Kasyapa, although sometimes the monks are simply generic monks. We also find statuary of nuns and lay worshippers and donors.

Standing near the doorways guarding the Buddha and his entourage are often pairs of dvarapala or the four Heavenly Kings (lokapala).

There are also statues of the historical Buddha, Sakyamuni, and the Buddha of the Future, Maitreya, recognizable by his seated position, legs crossed at the ankle. Some of the statues of the historical Buddha show Gandharan influences from Central Asia. The clue is in the volume and drapery of the robes as well as the shape and proportions of the statue's body and head.

Nearly all of the statuary at Maijishan is made of clay with the addition of some sort of binding agent to help preserve the sculpture. When stone sculptures appear (for example, in caves 117, 127, 133 and 135), they are generally made of sandstone, and many are exquisite. The sandstone is reported not to be indigenous but instead of unknown origin. It is also unknown where the statues were made, or how they were hauled up into the caves. Of special note is Cave 133 with 23 stone stele.

== Comparison ==
While there are many examples of Wei statuary, there are fewer examples from the Northern Zhou, which replaced the Wei with more solid, massive, and sculptural forms. The influences mentioned earlier that came from India (and perhaps SE Asia) begin to be apparent in this period and the subsequent Sui, when stiffly posed figures are replaced by more liquid tribhanga stances.

One of the most common types of caves found at both Dunhuang and Yungang – that of a cave with a central shaft – is not found at Maijishan.

We have almost no records of Maijishan during the Tang, a period during which it was probably in part under the control of the Tibetans as a result of the An Lushan rebellion (An saw an opportunity to swoop in and capture Chang'an and its regions). Because both Dunhuang and Maijishan were under Tibetan occupation in 845 CE, the year of the great Buddhist persecutions, both were fortunately saved.

Today, we can find some Tang sculptural influence in the powerful modeling of some of the guardian deities, for example, the very large dvarapala on the narrow open terrace from which lead the Seven Buddha Halls.

== Upkeep ==
The Tang was also an era of noteworthy earthquakes, including a very severe one in the region in 734. The Tang poet Du Fu visited the site 25 years later, and wrote a poem entitled "Mountain Temples" that probably is a description of Maijishan. It translates:

There are few monks left in these remote shrines,

And in the wilderness the narrow paths are high.
The musk-deer sleep among the stones and bamboo,
The cockatoos peck at the golden peaches.
Streams trickle down among the paths;
Across the overhanging cliff the cells are ranged,
Their tiered chambers reaching to the very peak;

And for a 100 li one can make out the smallest thing.

The Sung dynasty brought major restoration initiatives to Maijishan so that much of what visitors see today are older grottoes with new or replaced Sung-period sculpture. The most notable change in this period is the shift in emphasis from the Buddha to the bodhisattvas "shown most dramatically in Cave 191 on the extreme western [cliff] face....

"The middle Ming was a period of revival and restoration [remember this is prime earthquake zone]—the last to make any significant mark on Maijishan before the present century." It was also during this period that the two huge triads of statues on the eastern and western faces of the cliff were repaired—on the southeast cliff face, a seated Maitreya with legs pendant, flanked by two standing bodhisattvas; and on the southwest cliff face, an incomplete triad of a tall standing Buddha flanked by two attendants.

In summary, construction and restoration extended over 12 dynasties at Maijishan: over the course of the Later Qin, Northern Wei, Western Wei, Northern Zhou, Sui, Tang, Period of the Five Dynasties, Song, Yuan, Ming and Qing.

Although the region has fallen victim to many earthquakes and other natural and man-made disasters, 194 caves remain, encompassing 7200 pieces of sculpture, and 1000 square meters of frescoes, all excavated on a cliff face 30 to 80 meters above ground.

Caves #1–50 are on the western cliff face; caves #51–191 on the eastern cliff face. These numbers were given the caves by the original 1952–53 Chinese archaeological team.

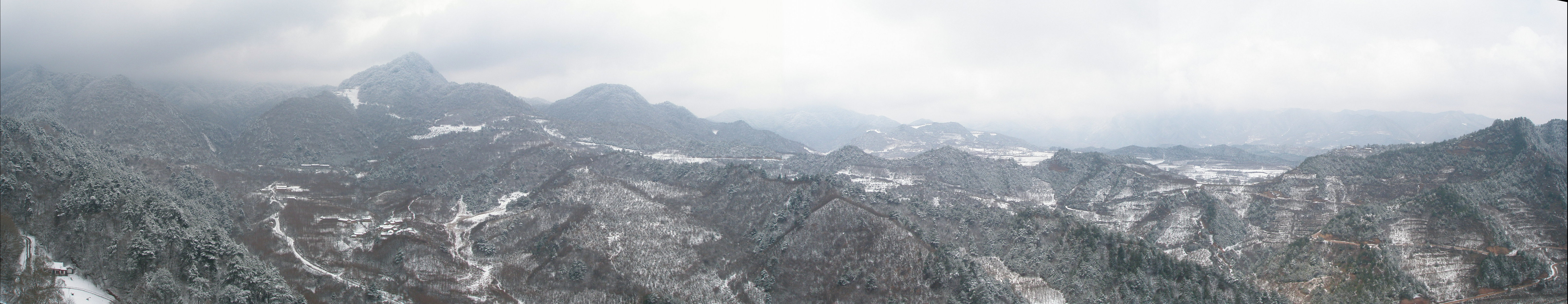
A panoramic view of the landscape around Maijishan, seen from the hill itself, in winter 2009
