= Western Thousand Buddha Caves =

Buddhist site in Gansu, China

Coordinates: 39°58′37″N 94°22′0″E

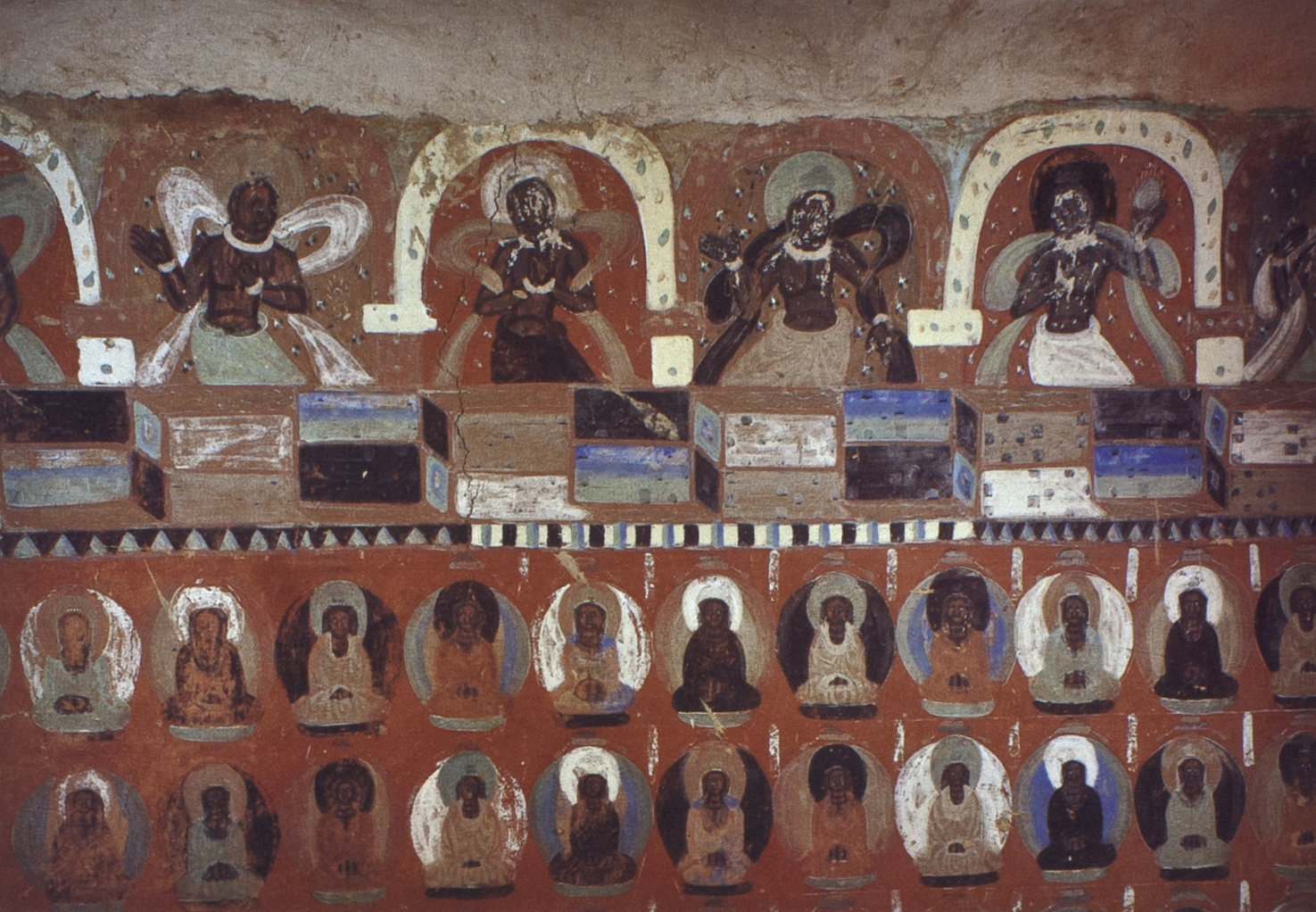
- Celestial figures above serial Buddhas in the Thousand Buddha tradition, west wall, Cave 7 (Northern Wei); the ritual practice of foming (佛名), or naming the Buddhas, may lie behind such representations (names appear on the white labels beside each figure in the lower two tiers)
- Chinese: 西千佛洞
Transcriptions
Standard Mandarin
- Hanyu Pinyin: Xī Qiānfó Dòng

The Western Thousand Buddha Caves (Chinese: 西千佛洞; pinyin: Xī Qiānfó Dòng) is a Buddhist cave temple site in Dunhuang, Gansu Province, China. The site is located approximately 35 km southwest of the urban centre and about the same distance from the Yangguan Pass; the area served as a staging post for travellers on the Silk Road. It is the western counterpart of the Mogao Caves, also known as the "Caves of the Thousand Buddhas" after the founding monk Yuezun's vision in 366 of "golden radiance in the form of a thousand Buddhas". The caves were excavated from the cliff that runs along the north bank of the Dang River. A number have been lost to floods and collapse; some forty are still extant. Twenty-two decorated caves house 34 polychrome statues and 800 m^{2} of wall paintings, dating from the Northern Wei to the late-Yuan and early-Ming dynasties (sixth to fourteenth centuries). The site was included within the 1961 designation of the Mogao Caves as a Major National Historical and Cultural Site.

== Caves ==
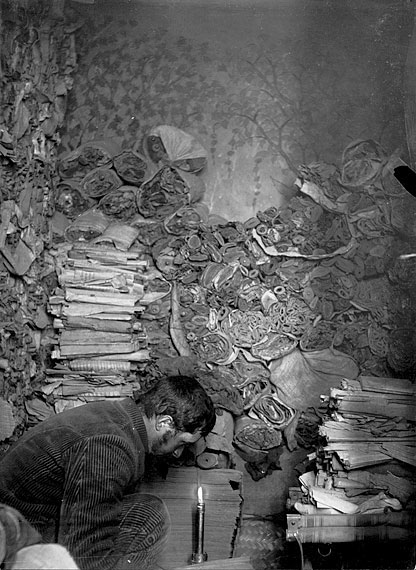
Pelliot examining manuscripts in the Library Cave at Mogao

A manuscript from the Library Cave, dating to the Five Dynasties and now at the Bibliothèque nationale in Paris, documents the early history of the site (P 5034): according to the Domain Record of Shazhou Dudu Prefecture – Shouchang County, "60 li east of the county is a very old inscription that says "Han Dynasty… made a small Buddha niche; the common people gradually built more". Since Shouchang County, modern Nanhu Village, is the location of the Yangguan Pass along the Hexi Corridor, it is understood that this is a reference to the origins of the Western Thousand Buddha Caves.

The decorated caves are in three main sections: Caves 1–19 at the west end of the cliff, approximately one kilometre from the modern reservoir; Cave 20 in the middle of the site, near the second floodgate; and Caves 21 and 22 at the eastern end of the cliff. Most of the sculptures were restored in a different style during the Qing dynasty and the Republic of China. The caves at the western end of the site have had aluminium doors and glass partitions installed more recently with the intention of mitigating the environmental causes of deterioration. Some of the paintings at the far east end of the site, distant from the custodians' lodgings, have been detached and remounted in a cave at Mogao. The ruined state of the main Buddha image in Northern Wei Cave 7 enables the construction techniques to be seen: layers of earthen render over an armature of branches and reeds. The loss of upper paint layers also reveals the linear grid used to set out the design of the Thousand Buddhas on the cave walls.

== List of caves ==
The twenty-two caves are dated as follows, based largely on the style of the paintings and their accompanying inscriptions:

Cave	Construction	Restorations	Former Numbering	Image
Cave 1	Five Dynasties		C1	
Cave 2	(date unclear)		C2	
Cave 3	Tang	(date unclear), Republic of China	C3	
Cave 4	Sui	Tang, (date unclear), Republic of China	C3b	
Cave 5	Early Tang	(date unclear)	C4	
Cave 7	Northern Wei	Western Wei, Qing	C5	
Cave 8	Northern Zhou	Sui	C5b	
Cave 9	Western Wei	Northern Zhou, Sui, early Tang, (date unclear), Qing	C6	
Cave 10	Sui	Tang	C7	
Cave 11	Northern Zhou	Sui, Tang, (date unclear), Republic of China	C8	
Cave 12	Northern Zhou	Sui, Tang, (date unclear), Republic of China	C9	
Cave 13	Northern Zhou		C10	
Cave 14	Early Tang	Five Dynasties	C11	
Cave 15	Sui	Tang, (date unclear)	C12	
Cave 16	Late Tang	Five Dynasties, Song, (date unclear), Republic of China	C13	
Cave 17	Late Tang		C14	
Cave 18	(date unclear)	Mid-Tang, Five Dynasties	C15	
Cave 19	Northern Zhou	Five Dynasties	C16	
Cave 20	Yuan		C17	
Cave 21	Ming		C18	
Cave 22	Northern Wei		C19	

== See also ==
- Bhadrakalpikasutra
- Mogao Caves
- Yulin Caves
- Principles for the Conservation of Heritage Sites in China
- National Heritage Sites in Gansu Province
- International Dunhuang Project
