= Principles for the Conservation of Heritage Sites in China =

The Principles for the Conservation of Heritage Sites in China (Chinese: 中国文物古迹保护准则; pinyin: Zhōngguó wénwù gǔjī bǎohù zhǔnzé) is a conservation charter promulgated in 2000 by China ICOMOS with the approval of National Cultural Heritage Administration (NCHA Chinese: 国家文物局; pinyin: Guójiā wénwù jú). It provides a methodological approach to the conservation of cultural heritage sites in China.

== Background ==
While sustained debate on approaches to conservation dates from the nineteenth century, only in the mid-twentieth century were the first international and national conservation charters drawn up. In China, the development of modern conservation concepts and practice began in the 1930s.

In 1950, the People's Republic of China began a national inventory and assessment of the significance of its cultural sites. As of 2004, over 400,000 heritage sites had been identified nationwide, with over 1,230 listed as being of national importance.

In 1982, the Law of the People's Republic of China on the Protection of Cultural Relics, consolidating previous legislation, entrusted primary responsibility for the conservation of cultural heritage to the government, while regulating the actions of conservation professionals. In 1985 China ratified the UNESCO World Heritage Convention. In May 1997, SACH requested that the Getty Conservation Institute assist in drawing up China's first conservation charter, with the Burra Charter proposed as a model. A tripartite project with the Australian Heritage Commission was launched in October 1997.

By involving foreign parties and drawing upon domestic experience, it was intended that international best practice should guide local heritage practitioners. The Preface to the China Principles states "China's magnificent sites are the heritage not only of the various ethnic groups in China but are also the common wealth of all humanity … it is the responsibility of all to bequeath these sites to future generations in their full integrity and authenticity." Economic development, mass tourism, globalization, and national interests have all affected the country's historic legacy.

== Promulgation and publication ==
The 38 articles of the China Principles, with accompanying commentary, were promulgated by China ICOMOS in late 2000 with the approval of SACH. The principles are grouped into five chapters: (1) General Principles; (2) The Conservation Process; (3) Conservation Principles; (4) Conservation Interventions; and (5) Additional Principles. An English-language translation was first published in July 2002 and a bilingual version with a Chinese-English and English-Chinese glossary was published in May 2004. It is recognised that, as use of the guidelines reveals the need for change, the Principles will be revised. A planned further document is to comprise illustrated examples of successful conservation measures.

== The 38 Articles ==
(1) Definition of heritage sites
(2) Conservation to include both intervention and preventive measures
(3) Heritage values
(4) Benefit of society not short-term gain
(5) Conservation to comply with laws, regulations and standards; significance is the highest priority throughout
(6) Research
(7) Documentation
(8) Management and training
(9) Conservation process
(10) Survey and inventory
(11) Assessment of values, condition and management
(12) Listing and buffer zones
(13) Conservation plans
(14) Actions plans for conservation, interpretation and education
(15) Periodic review of conservation plans
(16) Peer review of conservation plans
(17) Day-to-day management
(18) Conservation in-situ
(19) Minimum intervention
(20) Maintenance programme
(21) Intervention must be reversible, 'unobtrusive' yet 'distinguishable', and disclosed to the public
(22) Conservation techniques and materials must be proven
(23) Aesthetic criteria, derived from historic authenticity
(24) Landscape and setting
(25) No reconstruction, except in special cases
(26) Excavation entails conservation
(27) Disaster plans
(28) Intervention should have clear objectives, use proven methods and materials, and be documented
(29) Regular maintenance
(30) Physical protection
(31) Minor restoration
(32) Any restoration should preserve traces of periods of significance
(33) No conjectural reconstruction
(34) Treatment of setting and landscaping should not adversely affect site
(35) Archaeological sites should typically be reburied to conserve and prevent theft
(36) Principles may also be applied to commemorative places
(37) Principles may also be drawn upon for cultural, historic, and submarine landscapes and historic cities
(38) Principles drafted and adopted by China ICOMOS and approved by SACH; amendments should follow similarly.

== Commentary ==
Extended commentary clarifies the way in which these principles should be interpreted and implemented.

== See also ==
- Archaeology of China
- Burra Charter
- Chinese architecture
- List of World Heritage Sites in China
- Major Historical and Cultural Site Protected at the National Level
- Values (heritage)
- Venice Charter
