= Yulin Caves =

Buddhist cave temple site in Guazhou County, Gansu Province, China

Coordinates: 40°3′33″N 95°56′10″E

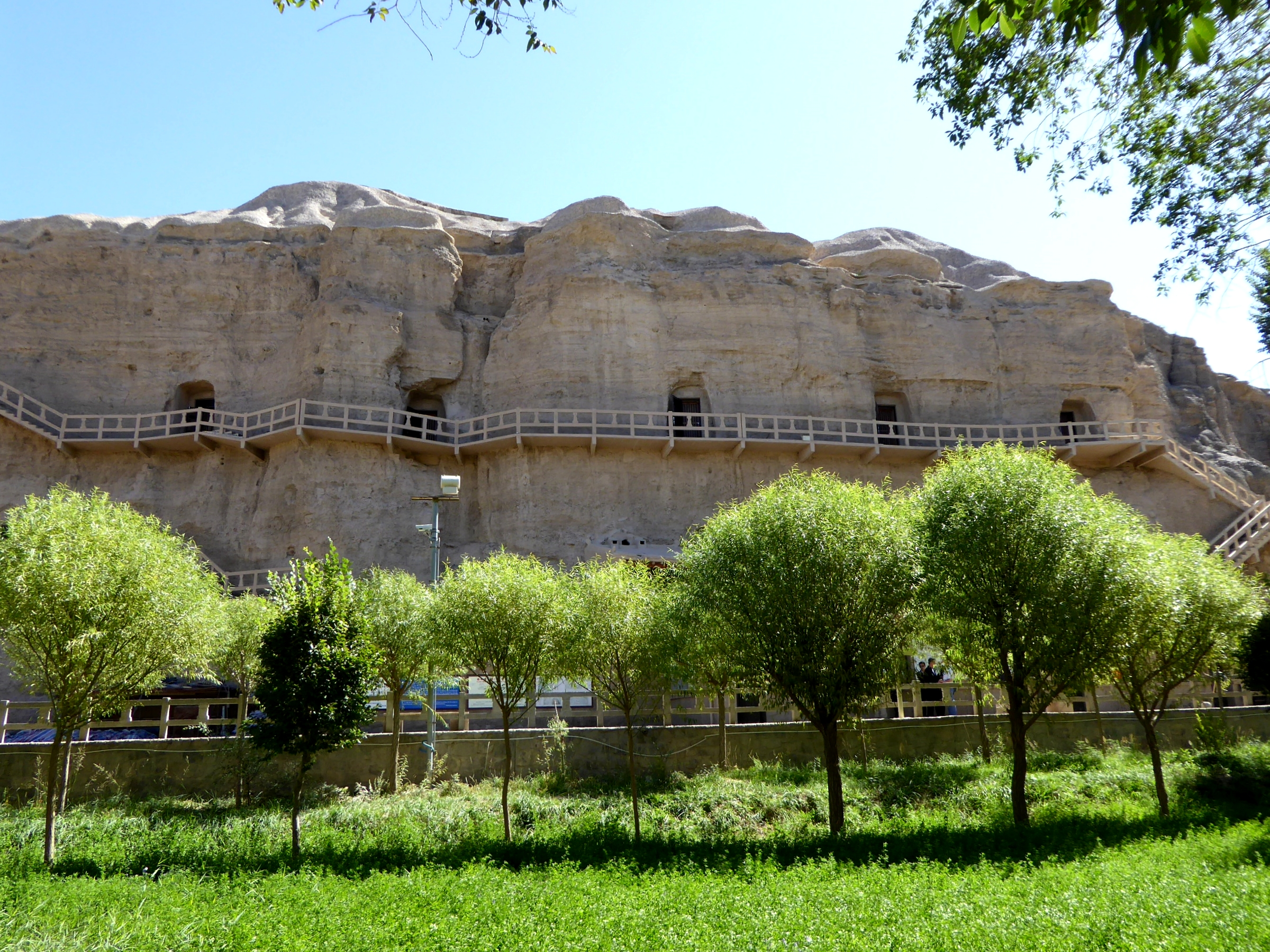
View of the Caves

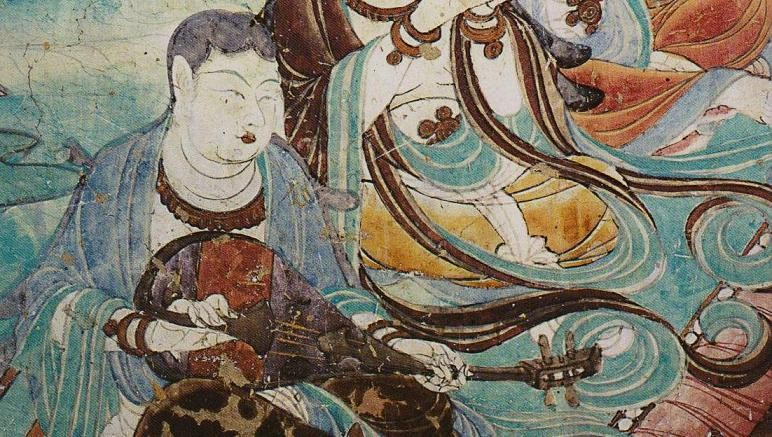
Pipa player, south wall of Cave 25 (Tang dynasty)

The Yulin Caves (Chinese: 榆林窟; pinyin: Yulin kū) is a Buddhist cave temple site in Guazhou County, Gansu Province, China. The site is located some 100 km (62 mi) east of the oasis town of Dunhuang and the Mogao Caves. It takes its name from the elm trees lining the Yulin River, which flows through the site and separates the two cliffs from which the caves have been excavated. The forty-two caves house some 250 polychrome statues and 4,200 m^{2} (45,000 sq ft) of wall paintings, dating from the Tang dynasty to the Yuan dynasty (seventh to fourteenth centuries). The site was among the first to be designated for protection in 1961 as a Major National Historical and Cultural Site. In 2008 the Yulin Grottoes were submitted for future inscription on the UNESCO World Heritage List as part of the Chinese Section of the Silk Road.

== Caves ==
Most of the caves take the form of an entrance corridor, antechamber, and main chamber. In three caves, a central pier was left intact during excavation then carved with niches on all four sides. A number of caves were reworked and repainted in later periods, since the site remained in use throughout the Tang, Five Dynasties, Song, Western Xia, and Yuan dynasties. It fell into disuse during the Ming dynasty. There were early efforts to restore the caves at the time of the Qing dynasty and several new caves also date to this period. More recently, under the management of the Dunhuang Academy, the focus has been on preventive conservation through consolidation of the cliff face and controlling access.

== Wall paintings ==
The paintings are Buddhist with some secular scenes, the former including buddhas, bodhisattvas, apsara, and jataka tales; and the latter, donor portraits, go players, representatives of China's ethnic minorities, marked out by their hair styles and dress, farming scenes such as milking a cow, wine-making, a smelting furnace, and a marriage ceremony; depictions of musicians and dancers help break down the distinction between the sacred and the profane. The paintings are not frescoes but instead executed on an earthen render with mineral and organic pigments and gum or glue binders.

== List of caves ==
The forty-two caves are dated as follows, based largely on the style of the paintings and their accompanying inscriptions (in Chinese, Mongolian, Tibetan, Sanskrit, Tangut, and Old Uighur):

Cave	Construction	Restorations	Former Numbering	Image
Cave 1	Qing			
Cave 2	Western Xia	Yuan, Qing	C1	
Cave 3	Western Xia	Yuan, Qing	C2	
Cave 4	Yuan	Qing	C3	
Cave 5	Tang	Qing		
Cave 6	Tang	Five Dynasties, Song, Western Xia, Qing, Republic of China	C4	
Cave 7	Qing			
Cave 8	Qing			
Cave 9	Qing			
Cave 10	Western Xia	Yuan, Qing	C5	
Cave 11	Qing			
Cave 12	Five Dynasties	Qing	C6	
Cave 13	Five Dynasties	Song, Qing	C7	
Cave 14	Song dynasty	Qing, Republic of China	C8	
Cave 15	Mid-Tang	Song, Western Xia, Yuan, Qing	C9	
Cave 16	Five Dynasties	Early Republic of China	C10	
Cave 17	Tang	Five Dynasties, Song, (date unclear), Qing	C11	
Cave 18	Five Dynasties	Western Xia, Yuan	C11b	
Cave 19	Five Dynasties	Qing	C12	
Cave 20	Tang	Five Dynasties, Song, Qing	C13	
Cave 21	Tang	Song, (date unclear), Qing	C14	
Cave 22	Tang	Song, Western Xia, Qing	C15	
Cave 23	Tang	Song, Qing	C16	
Cave 24	Tang		C17b	
Cave 25	Mid-Tang, reigned by Tibet Empire	Five Dynasties, Song, Qing	C17	
Cave 26	Tang	Five Dynasties, Song, (date unclear), Qing	C18	
Cave 27	Tang		C18b	
Cave 28	Early-Tang	Song, Western Xia, Qing	C19	
Cave 29	Western Xia	Yuan, Qing	C20	
Cave 30	Late-Tang	Song	C20	
Cave 31	Five Dynasties	Qing	C21	
Cave 32	Five Dynasties	Song	C22	
Cave 33	Five Dynasties	Qing	C23	
Cave 34	Tang	Five Dynasties, Song, Qing	C24	
Cave 35	Tang	Five Dynasties, Song, Qing	C25	
Cave 36	Tang	Five Dynasties, Song, Qing	C26	
Cave 37	Qing			
Cave 38	Tang	Five Dynasties, Qing	C27	
Cave 39	Tang	(date unclear), Yuan, Qing	C28	
Cave 40	Five Dynasties	Qing	C29	
Cave 41	Five Dynasties	Yuan, Qing		
Cave 42	High-Tang			

== See also ==
- Mogao Caves
- Principles for the Conservation of Heritage Sites in China
- National Heritage Sites in Gansu Province
- International Dunhuang Project
- World Heritage Sites in China
