= Ta'er Temple (Suoyang City) =

Ruined Buddhist temple in Suoyang City, China

Coordinates: 40°15′01″N 96°13′01″E

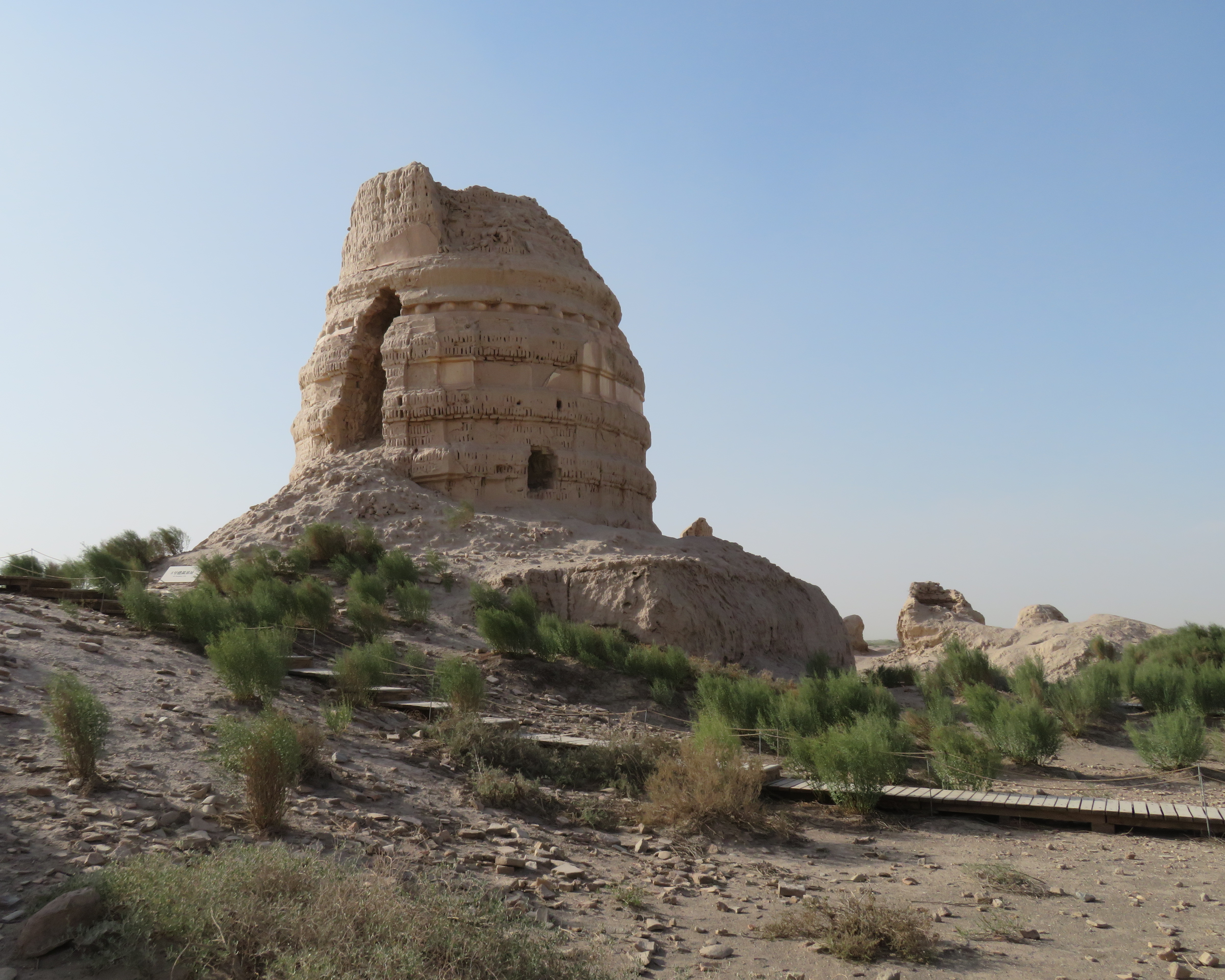
The main pagoda

The Ta'er Temple (Chinese: 塔尔寺; lit. 'Pagoda Temple') is the modern name of a ruined Buddhist temple outside of the walls of Suoyang City in Guazhou County, Gansu, China. It has been tentatively identified with the King Ashoka Temple (Chinese: 阿育王寺; pinyin: Āyùwāng Sì) recorded in historical documents, which was first built in the Northern Zhou dynasty (557–581) at the latest. The extant ruins, including the main adobe pagoda and eleven smaller ones, mostly date to the Western Xia dynasty (1038–1227).

== Temple ruins ==
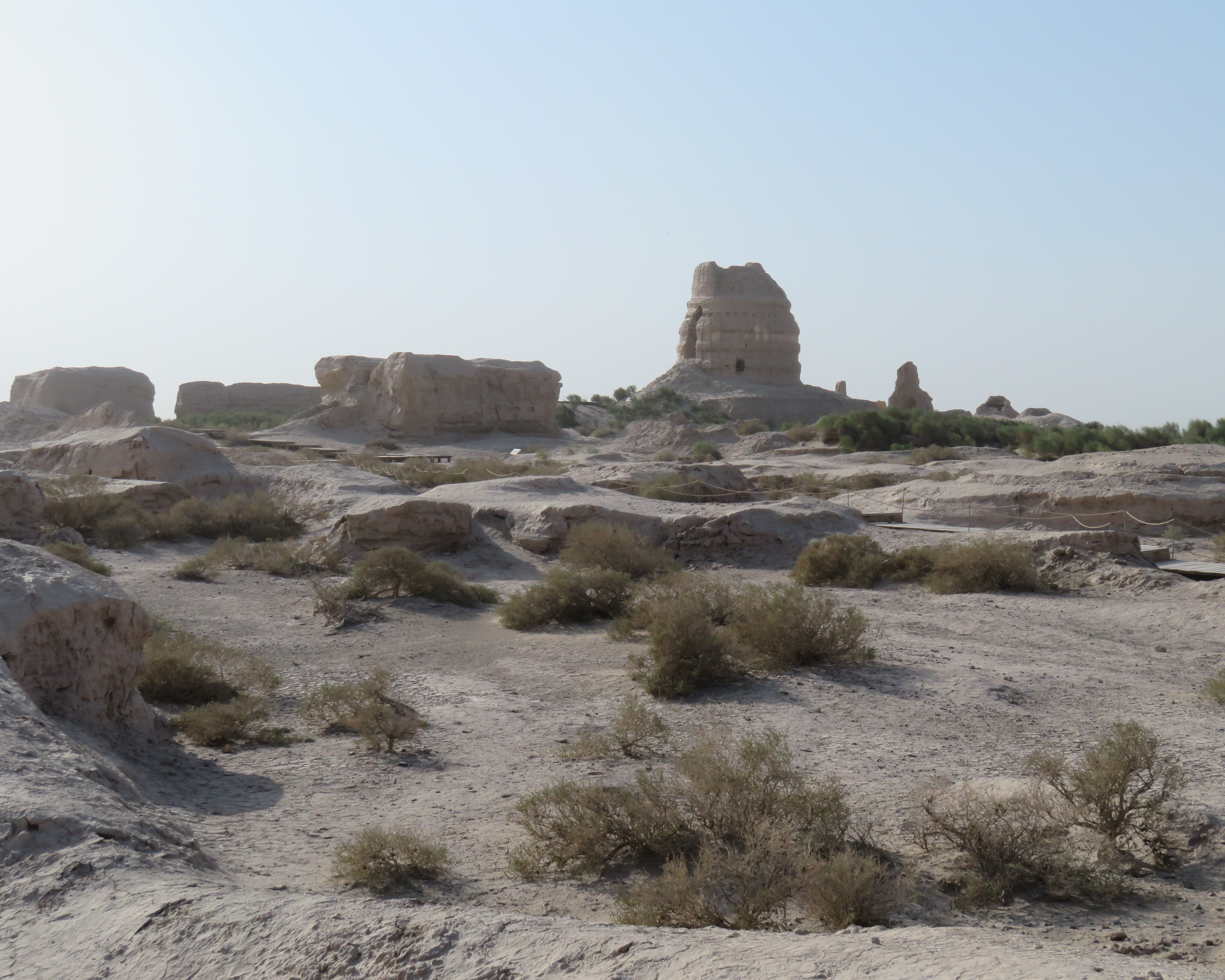
View of the ruins

The Ta'er Temple is located 1 kilometre (0.62 mi) east of Suoyang City, which was the seat of Guazhou Prefecture in the Tang dynasty. The temple ruins occupy an area of 15,000 square metres (160,000 sq ft). The remaining structures include a main pagoda, 11 smaller ones, foundations of a drum tower and a bell tower, and residential quarters for monks.

At the center of the site lies the foundation of a large temple building, north of which is the main pagoda standing 14.5 metres (48 ft) tall. The adobe structure is covered by white lime and is of the shape of an overturned bowl. North of the main pagoda are the remains of 11 smaller ones. Most of the extant ruins date from the Western Xia dynasty, including all of the pagodas.

== History and archaeology ==
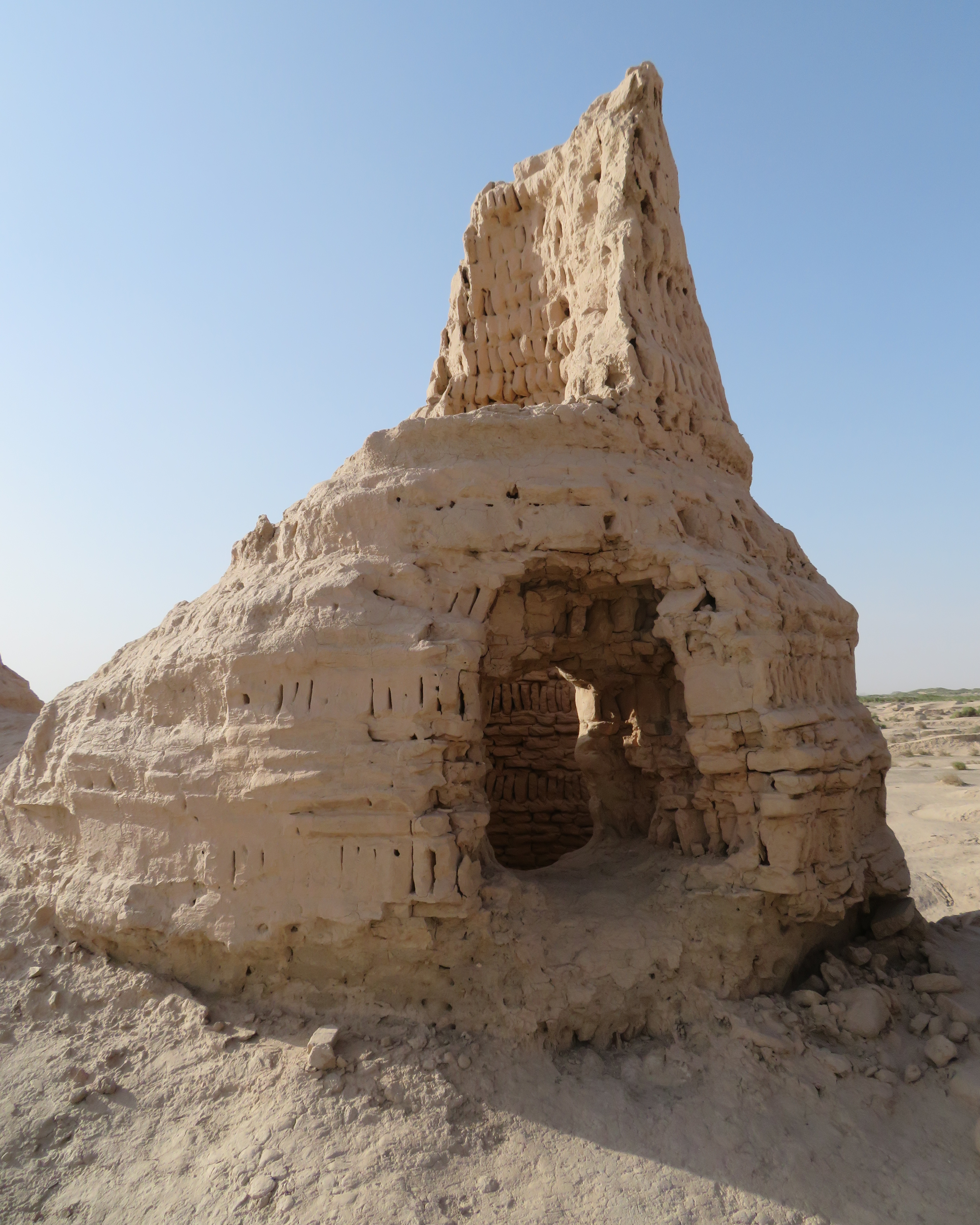
One of the 11 smaller pagodas

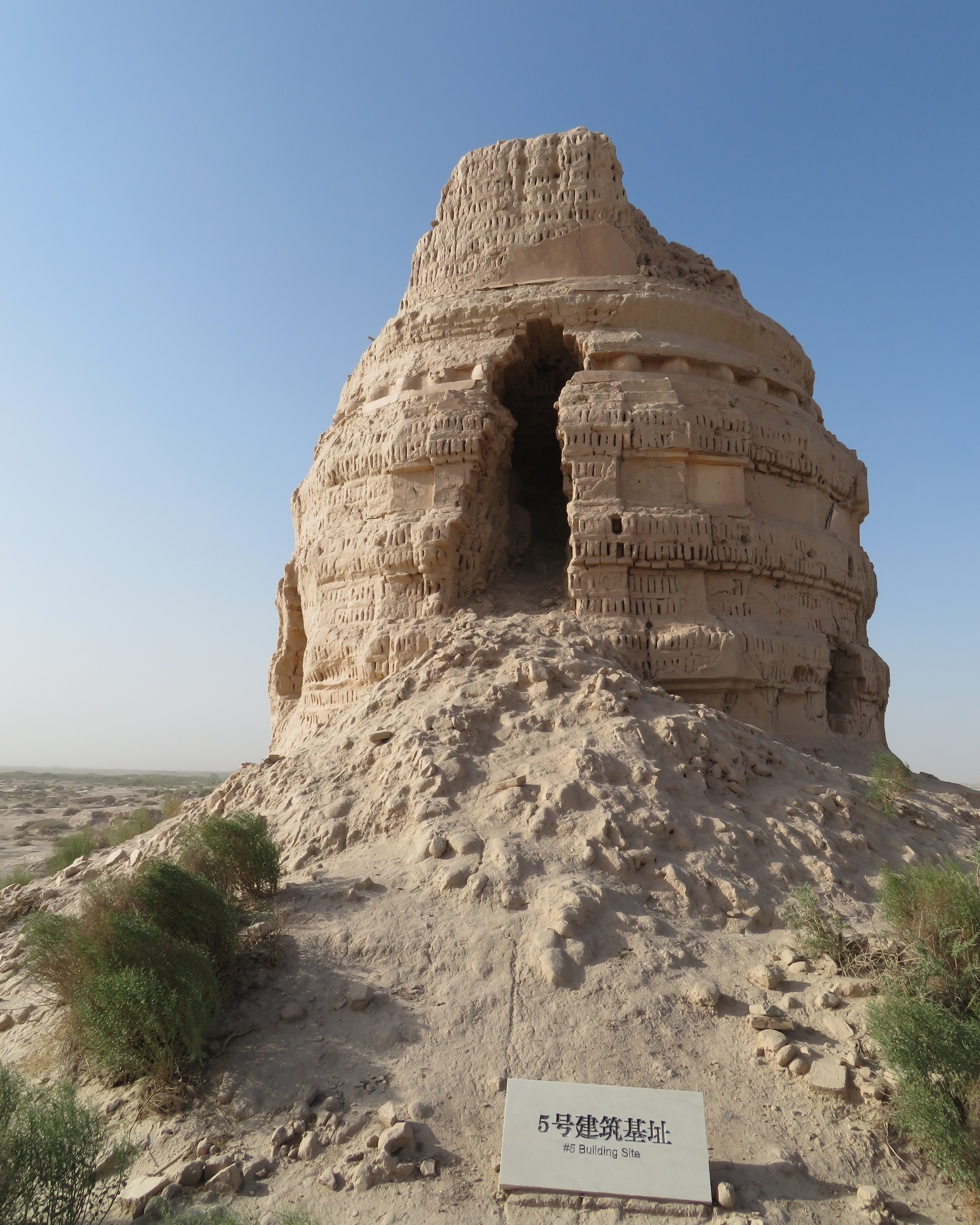
The main pagoda

Scholar Li Zhengyu has identified the Ta'er Temple with the King Ashoka Temple recorded in historical documents. The King Ashoka Temple is described as being located east of Guazhou City, which matches Ta'er Temple's location. It was first built in the Northern Zhou dynasty at the latest, destroyed in Emperor Wu of Northern Zhou's suppression of Buddhism, and rebuilt in the Tang and Western Xia dynasties. In cave 16 of the Yulin Caves, a Western Xia monk named Huicong (Chinese: 惠聰) from the King Ashoka Temple left inscriptions recording his pilgrimage to the cave temple with his disciples.

In 627, Tang dynasty monk Xuanzang preached in Guazhou for over a month before he set out for his famous pilgrimage to India, and the Ta'er Temple is thought to be the probable location of his sojourn.

The Qing dynasty publication New Gazetteer of Suzhou (Chinese: 肅州新志) records the discovery of a broken stone stele in the temple ruins. The remnants of the stele inscription, written in Tang dynasty calligraphy, lauded the 9th-century general Zhang Yichao, who recovered the Dunhuang region after decades of Tibetan control and was awarded high positions by the Tang court. The obverse side of the stele appeared to praise the deeds of Cao Yijin, a tenth-century governor of the Guiyi Circuit.

According to local eyewitnesses, a band of Russians came to the site in the 1940s and broke open the main pagoda. They found numerous sutras and paintings inside and took them away. Archaeologists later discovered a paper document from inside one of the smaller pagodas. On it are the printed words of the Buddhist mantra Om mani padme hum, in the Tangut script of the Western Xia.

In 2014, Suoyang City and its associated ruins were inscribed on UNESCO's list of World Heritage Sites as part of Silk Roads: the Routes Network of Chang'an-Tianshan Corridor.
