= Silk Roads: the Routes Network of Chang'an-Tianshan Corridor =

World Heritage Site in Central Asia

UNESCO World Heritage Site
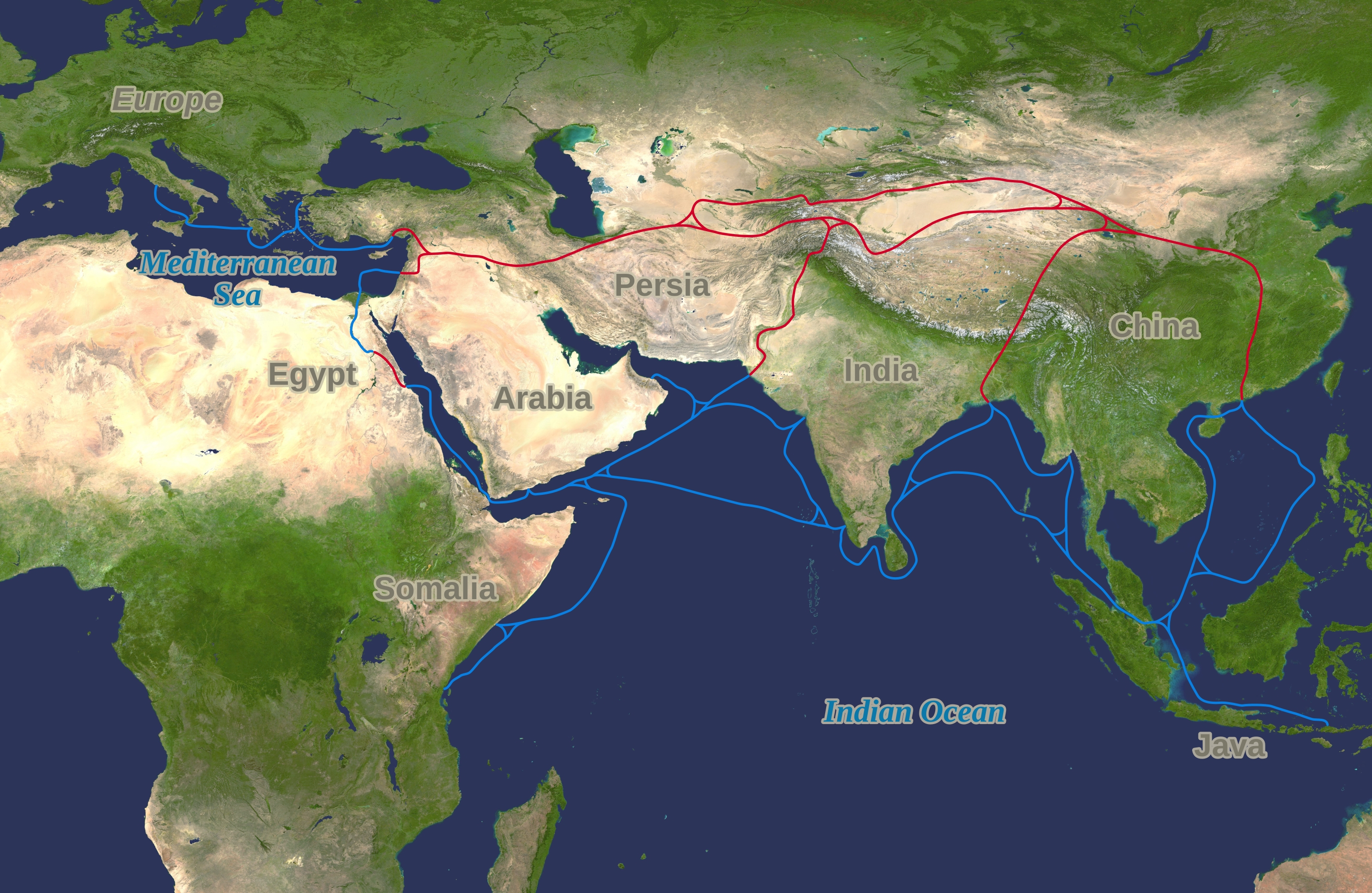
- Silk Road extending from Europe through Asia. Overland routes are red, and the maritime routes are blue.
- Location: China; Kazakhstan; Kyrgyzstan
- Includes: 33 locations in 3 countries
- Criteria: Cultural: ii, iii, v, vi
- Reference: 1442
- Inscription: 2014 (38th Session)
- Area: 42,668.16 ha (164.7427 sq mi)
- Buffer zone: 189,963.1 ha (733.452 sq mi)
- Website: www.silkroads.org.cn

Silk Roads: The Routes Network of Chang'an-Tian Shan Corridor is a UNESCO World Heritage Site which covers the Chang'an-Tianshan portion of the ancient Silk Road and historical sites along the route. On June 22, 2014, UNESCO designated a 5,000 km (3,100 mi) stretch of the Silk Road network from Central China to the Zhetysu region of Central Asia as a World Heritage site. The corridor spans China, Kazakhstan and Kyrgyzstan and includes 33 new sites and several previously designated heritage sites.

== History ==
In 1988, UNESCO initiated a study of the Silk Road to promote understanding of cultural diffusion across Eurasia and protection of cultural heritage. In August 2006, UNESCO and the State Administration of Cultural Heritage of the People's Republic of China co-sponsored a conference in Turpan, Xinjiang on the coordination of applications for the Silk Road's designation as a World Heritage site. At this conference, China and five Central Asia republics, Kazakhstan, Kyrgyzstan, Tajikistan, Uzbekistan, and Turkmenistan, agreed to make a joint application in 2010. The six countries formed a coordinating committee in 2009 to prepare for the joint-application.

On March 28, 2008, China submitted a tentative list of 48 Silk Road sites to UNESCO for consideration as cultural heritage. These sites were divided into overland Silk Road sites in Henan, Shaanxi, Qinghai, and Gansu Province, Ningxia Hui Autonomous Region and Xinjiang Uyghur Autonomous Region as well as maritime Silk Road sites in Ningbo, Zhejiang Province and Quanzhou, Fujian Province. On May 2, 2008, Iran submitted a tentative list of Silk Route sites in Khorasan Province. On January 3, 2010, Turkmenistan submitted a list of 29 sites along 11 segments of the Silk Road. On January 20, 2010, India submitted a tentative list of Silk Road sites divided into 12 components. On February 19, 2010, Kyrgyzstan submitted a list of six sites and Uzbekistan submitted a list with 18 sites. Kazakhstan's tentative list was submitted on May 3, 2012.

At the end of 2011, UNESCO proposed that due to the vast scale of the Silk Road project that the application be divided into corridors. In December 2011, China, Kazakhstan and Kyrgyzstan agreed to jointly pursue application for one corridor from Central China across the Tianshan Range, and each country nominated one government official, one archaeologist and a national application committee. Tajikistan, Uzbekistan and Turkmenistan prepared to apply for another corridor. In 2013, the application for the Chang'an-Tianshan Corridor was finalized and officially submitted by Kyrgyzstan. It contained 22 sites in China, 8 sites in Kazakhstan and 3 sites in Kyrgyzstan. Each UNESCO member country may submit one application per year, and China had submitted an application for the Grand Canal. The original sites proposed by China was substantially revised for this application. Sites in the Ningxia Hui Autonomous Region and relating to the Maritime Silk Road were removed. Chinese organizers have said that several of the sites left out of the application may be submitted in the future.

On June 22, 2014, at the 38th meeting of the World Heritage Committee in Doha, Qatar, the Chang'an-Tianshan Corridor application was approved.

== Sites ==
The Silk Road's Chang'an-Tianshan Corridor, which was approved by the World Heritage Committee in June 2014 as Site No. 1442, consists of 33 newly designated sites in China, Kazakhstan and Kyrgyzstan. The sites include capital cities and palace complexes of various empires and kingdoms, trading settlements, Buddhist cave temples, ancient paths, posthouses, mountain passes, beacon towers, sections of the Great Wall, fortifications, tombs and religious buildings. Collectively, the 33 sites cover an area of 42,668.16 ha (164.7 sq mi) and have buffer zone 189,963.13 ha (733.5 sq mi).

The sites are categorized into four regions along the Silk Road by ICOMOS, which assessed eligibility for the World Heritage inscription:

1. Central China - ancient imperial capitals in the Central and Guanzhong Plains of China.

- Luoyang City of the Eastern Han to Northern Wei Dynasty, Luoyang, Henan Province
- Dingding Gate, Luoyang City of the Sui and Tang Dynasty, Luoyang
- Hangu Pass, Xin'an County, Henan
- Shihao section of Xiaohan Route, Sanmenxia, Henan
- Weiyang Palace, Xi'an, Shaanxi Province
- Daming Palace, Xi'an
- Giant Wild Goose Pagoda, Xi'an
- Small Wild Goose Pagoda, Xi'an
- Xingjiao Temple, Xi'an
- Bin County Cave Temple, Bin County, Shaanxi
- Tomb of Zhang Qian, Chenggu County, Shaanxi
- Maijishan Cave Temple Complex, Tianshui, Gansu Province

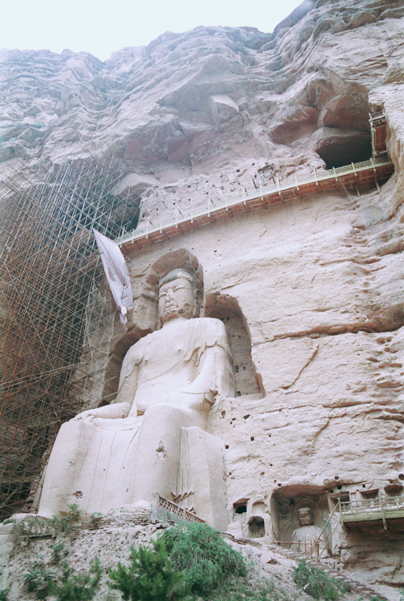
Bingling Temple Grottoes

2. Hexi Corridor in Gansu Province, connecting China Proper and Xinjiang.

- Bingling Temple Grottoes, Yongjing County
- Yumen Pass, Dunhuang
- Dunhuang Beacons
- Xuanquanzhi Posthouse, Dunhuang
- Suoyang City Ruins, Guazhou

3. North and South of Tianshan Mountains in Xinjiang, China

- Qocho (Gaochang) City Ruins, Turpan
- Jiaohe Ruins, Turpan
- Beshbalik (Beiting) City Ruins, Jimsar County
- Kizil Gaha Beacon Tower, Kuqa (Kucha)
- Kizil Caves, Kuqa
- Subash Buddhist Temple Ruins, Kuqa

4. Zhetysu Region of the Ili and Talas Valleys of Kazakhstan and the Chüy Valley of Kyrgyzstan

- Site of Kayalyk, Almaty Region, Kazakhstan
- Karamergen, Almaty Region, Kazakhstan
- Talgar, Almaty Region, Kazakhstan
- Aktobe, Jambyl Region, Kazakhstan
- Kulan, Jambyl Region, Kazakhstan
- Akyrtas, Jambyl Region, Kazakhstan
- Ornek, Jambyl Region, Kazakhstan
- Kostobe, Jambyl Region, Kazakhstan
- City of Suyab (Site of Ak-Beshim), Chüy Region, Kyrgyzstan
- City of Balasagun (Site of Burana), Chüy Region, Kyrgyzstan
- City of Nevaket (Site of Krasnaya Rechka), Chüy Region, Kyrgyzstan

Other sites at the Chang'an-Tianshan Corridor are the Mogao Caves in Dunhuang which had already been inscribed as a World Heritage Site in 1987, and the Longmen Grottoes, which contain more than 10,000 statues with more than 2,800 inscriptions on them, in Luoyang which had already been inscribed as a World Heritage Site in 2000.
