= Suyab =

5th–11th-century Silk Road city in modern Kyrgyzstan

- Ordukent
- Location within Kyrgyzstan Location within West and Central Asia
- 42°48′18.8″N 75°11′59.6″E
- Type: Settlement
- Location: Chüy Region, Kyrgyzstan

History
- Built: 5-6th century
- Abandoned: 11th century

Site notes
- Condition: In ruins

Suyab (Persian: سوی آب; traditional Chinese: 碎葉; simplified Chinese: 碎叶; pinyin: Suìyè; Wade–Giles: Sui^{4}-yeh^{4} Middle Chinese: /suʌiH jiᴇp̚/), also known as Ordukent (modern-day Ak-Beshim), was an ancient Silk Road city located some 50 km (31 mi) east from Bishkek, and 8 km (5.0 mi) west southwest from Tokmok, in the Chu river valley, present-day Kyrgyzstan. The ruins of this city, along with other archaeological sites associated with the Silk Road, was inscribed in 2014 as part of the Silk Roads: the Routes Network of Chang'an-Tianshan Corridor UNESCO World Heritage Site.

== History ==
The settlement of Sogdian merchants sprang up along the Silk Road in the 5th or 6th century. The name of the city derives from the Suyab River, whose origin is Iranian (in Persian: suy means "toward"+ ab for "water", "rivers"). It was first recorded by Chinese pilgrim Xuanzang who traveled in the area in 629:

Traveling 500 li to the north west of Great Qing Lake, we arrive at the city of the Suye River. The city is 6 or 7 li in circuit; various Hu ("barbarian") merchants here came from surrounding nations congregate and dwell. The soil is favorable for red millet and for grapes; the woods are not thick, the climate is windy and cold; the people wear garments of twilled wool. Traveling from Suye westward, there are a great number of isolated towns; in each there is a chieftain; these are not dependent on one another, but all are in submission to the Tujue.

Description of the surrounding locales by Xuanzang:

Several dozen cities with high ramparts situated in the west of Suyab, though they are not directly subordinate, are under the administration of the Turks.… I walked four hundred li from Suyab to Qianquan 千泉 (Bing-bu-laq) … where the Qaghan of the Turks had his summer residence.… One hundred and forty or fifty li west from Qianquan is the city of Talas … I walked around ten li further south, and nearly three hundred families who used to be Chinese reside there in a lonely town. After being pillaged by the Turks, they changed their costume into the Turkish style, but kept Chinese customs and continued to speak their mother tongue.

During the reign of Tong Yabghu Qaghan, Suyab was the principal capital of the Western Turkic Khaganate. The khagan also had a summer capital in Navekat near the springs north of Tashkent in the Talas Valley. There was a sort of symbiosis, with the Sogdians responsible for economical prosperity and the Göktürks in charge of the city's military security.

Following the downfall of the khaganate, Suyab was absorbed into the Tang dynasty and was a military outpost between 648 and 719. A Chinese fortress was built there in 679, and Buddhism flourished. According to some accounts, the poet Li Bai was born in Suyab. Wang Fangyi (622–684) was an adjutant in the army of the Tang general Pei Xingjian (622–684) during his expedition to restore Narsieh to the throne of Persia. He built a city at Suyab in 679. According to a stele inscription for Wang Fangyi, Suyab had dense streets with a mixed population of Chinese and foreigners. The Old Book of Tang says that Suyab was surrounded by twelve gates on four sides that were curved to hide its inhabitants. The sight perplexed the barbarians.

Suyab was one of the Four Garrisons of the Anxi Protectorate until 719, when it was handed over to Suluk of the Türgesh, appointed by the Tang court as the "Loyal and Obedient Qaghan". After Suluk's murder in 738, the town was promptly retaken by Tang Chinese forces, along with Talas. The fort was strategically important during the wars between the Tang dynasty and the Tibetan Empire.

The Chinese traveler Du Huan, who visited Suyab in 751, found among the ruins a still-functioning Buddhist monastery, where Princess Jiaohe, daughter of Ashina Huaidao, used to live.

In 766, the city fell to a Karluk ruler, allied with the nascent Uyghur Khaganate.

Of the subsequent history of Suyab there is little record, especially after the Chinese evacuated the Four Garrisons in 787. David Nicolle states that Suyab provided 80,000 warriors for the Karluk army and that it was governed by a man known as "King of Heroes". Hudud al-Alam, completed in 983, lists Suyab as a city of 20,000 inhabitants. It is believed to have been supplanted by Balasagun in the early 11th century and was abandoned soon after.

The area around Suyab briefly returned to China under the Qing dynasty during the 18th century, but was ceded to the Russian Empire in the Treaty of Tarbagatai in 1864, along with Lake Balkhash. It became part of the Russian Empire's Semirechye Oblast; following the completion of national delimitation in Soviet Central Asia in 1936, Suyab was put into the Kyrgyz Soviet Socialist Republic.

== Archaeological site ==
In the 19th century the ruins at Ak-Beshim were erroneously identified with Balasagun, the capital of the Kara-Khitans. Vasily Bartold, who visited the site in 1893–1894, also lent his support to this identification. Although excavations started in 1938, it was not until the 1950s that it was determined that the site had been abandoned as early as the 11th century and therefore was not Balasagun, which had flourished until the 14th century.

The archaeological site of Suyab covers some 30 hectares. As a testimony to Suyab's diverse and vibrant culture, the site encompasses remains of Chinese fortifications, Nestorian Christian churches, Zoroastrian ossuaries, and Turkic balbals. The site is particularly rich in finds of Buddha statues and stelae. Apart from several Buddhist temples, there were a Nestorian church and cemetery from the 7th century, and probably also a 10th-century monastery with frescoes and inscriptions in Sogdian and Uyghur scripts.

== See also ==
- Navekat
