= Navekat =

Ancient Silk Road city

- Nevkat
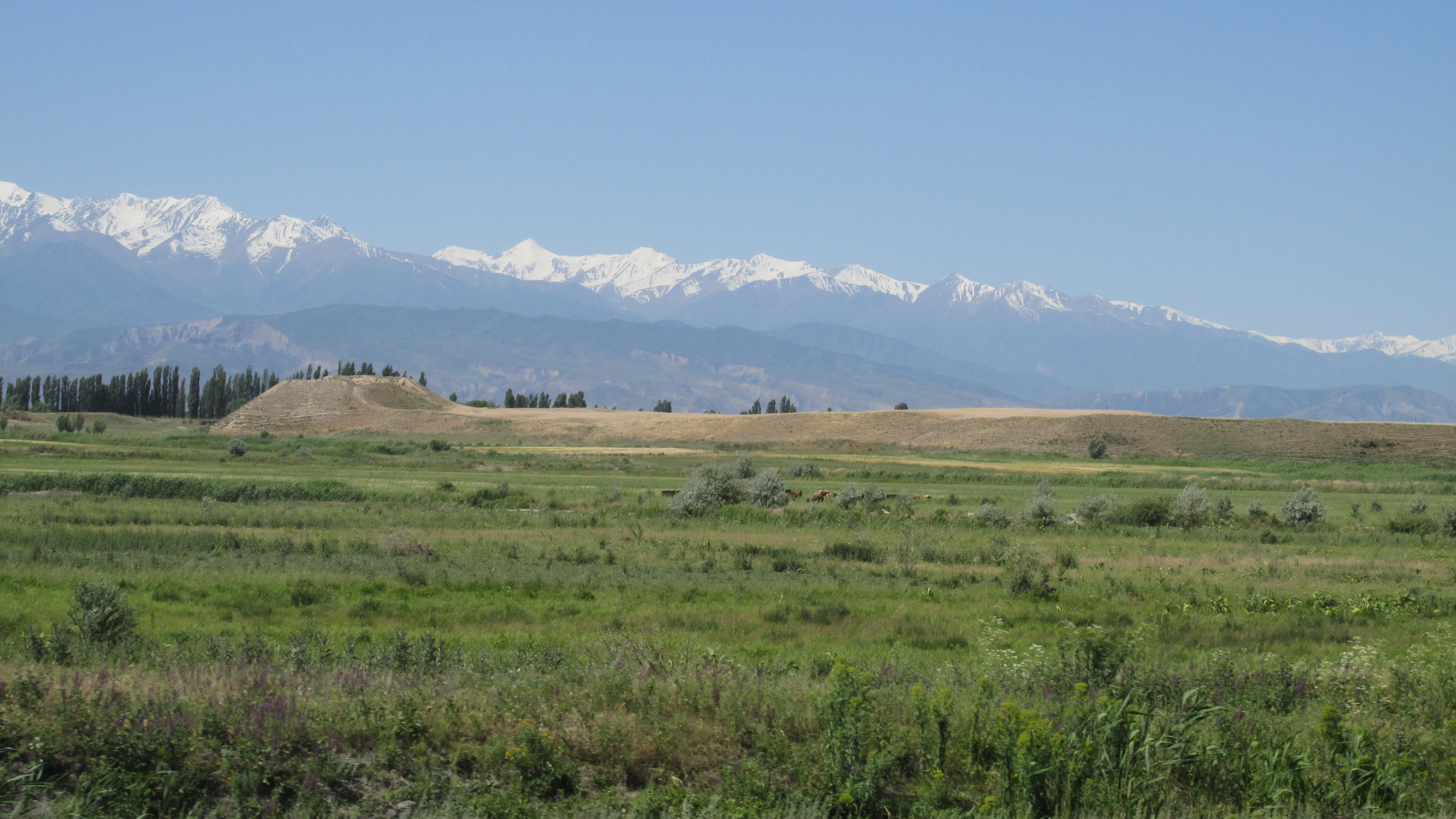
- Ruins of Navekat

- Location within Kyrgyzstan Location within West and Central Asia
- 42°54′56.2″N 75°0′29.9″E
- Type: Settlement
- Location: Chüy Region, Kyrgyzstan

History
- Built: 5–6th century
- Abandoned: 12th century

Site notes
- Condition: In ruins

Navekat or Nevkat was an ancient Silk Road city that flourished between the 6th and 12th centuries. It lies near the modern village of Krasnaya Rechka, in the Chüy Valley, present-day Kyrgyzstan, about 30 km (19 mi) east of Bishkek. It was one of the most important trading centres of the region. Navekat was inscribed as a UNESCO World Heritage Site in 2014 as a part of the site "Silk Roads: the Routes Network of Chang'an-Tianshan Corridor".

== Archaeological site ==
Navekat had two walls: the first around the shahristan, the traditional administrative center of this type of city; the second wall was more than 18 km (11 mi) long, with public buildings, markets, gardens and even farms inside. There was a citadel (Persian: كهندز, romanized: kuhandiz) in the northeastern part of the city built on a massive earthen platform. The volume of this platform was about 13 million cubic meters, probably the largest man-made mound in the world.

During archaeological excavations, artifacts uncovered included a golden burial mask and an 8-metre (26 ft)-long reclining Buddha statue in one of the two Buddhist temples. Other artifacts demonstrate the presence of Buddhists, Zoroastrians, Eastern Christians, and Manicheans.

== See also ==
- Suyab
- Balasagun
- Burana tower
