= Dunhuang Watchtowers =

- 敦煌墩台
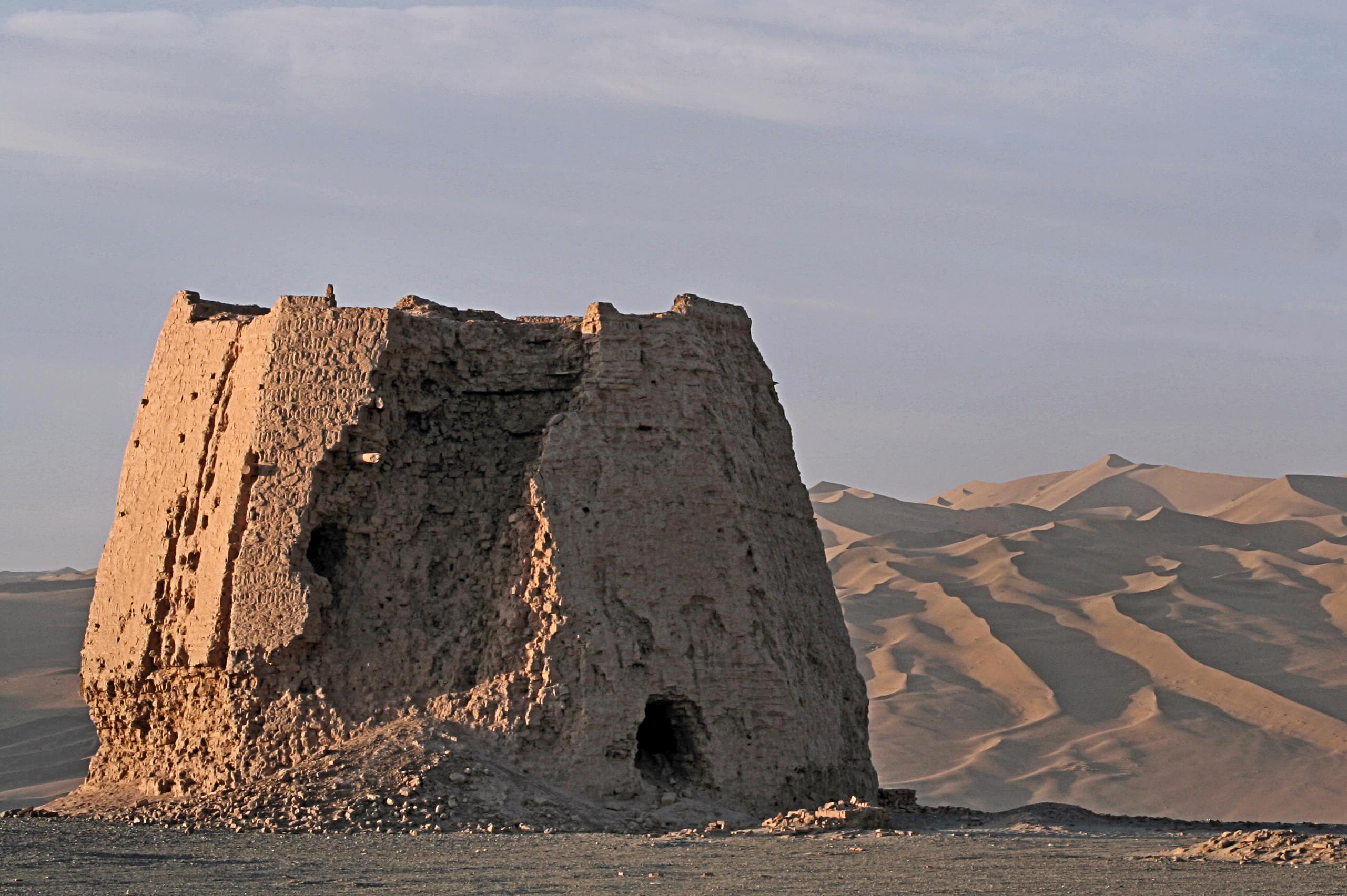
- Beacon near Anxi (Now called Guazhou) in 2007

General information
- Location: Gansu Province, China
- Year built: 111 BC~

The Dunhuang Watchtowers or Beacons (Mandarin: 敦煌墩台) are a series of Han Dynasty-era fortifications stretching 140 miles east of Dunhuang built along the site of the old Silk Road. They served as important military outposts utilized by the Han Dynasty and its successors to protect against incursions from nomadic raiders and other threats. They were listed by UNESCO as part of the Yumen Pass Gate as a World Heritage Site in 2014.

== Origin ==
The watchtowers in and around Dunhuang date back to at least the 2nd Century BC. Dunhuang had emerged as a prominent rest stop and oasis city along the Silk road after its founding under Emperor Wu of Han in 111 BC, and soon after began to flourish. Due to its rising notoriety as a stable settlement along the often tumultuous Silk road, fortifications began construction shortly. These military outposts were used both as important strategic positions to provide defense to the region as well as serve as symbols of Han military might in the area.

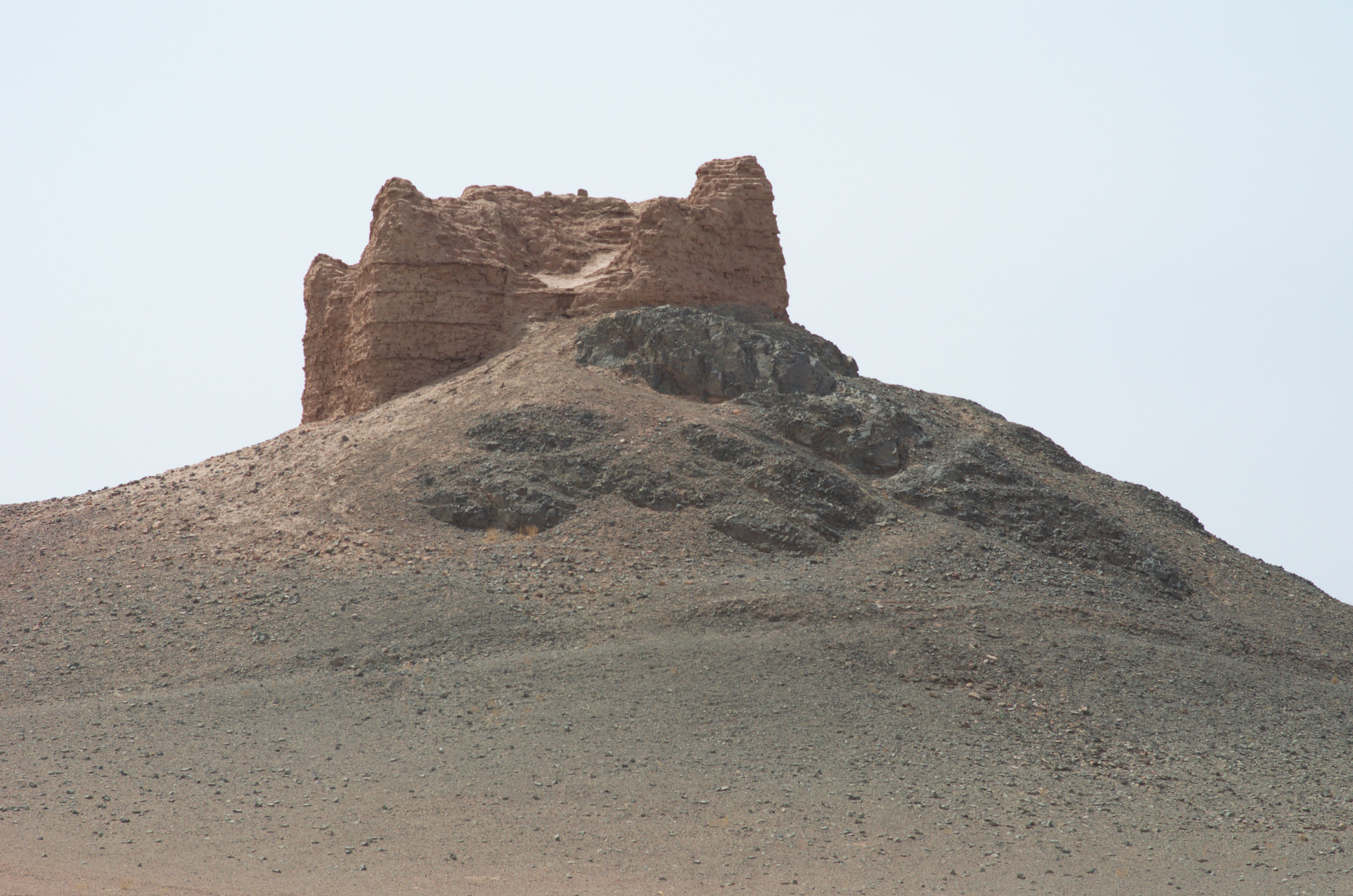
Ruined hilltop tower near Dunhuang

== Construction ==
The watchtowers were typically constructed using rammed earth, a common building technique in arid regions of Northwestern China, and during the Han Dynasty. Their walls were thick and tapered, allowing them to withstand erosion and strong desert winds. Towers were often built at regular intervals to maintain visibility between neighboring outposts, enabling effective communication across long distances.

== Function ==
The Dunhuang Watchtowers served as important lookout stations along the eastern edge of the Tarim Basin frontier. Stretching 140 miles from Dunhuang to Anxi (Modern day Guazhou), they enabled continuous lines of communication to be drawn between military outposts. Fires were lit from the tops of the towers to signal other garrisons of impending threats and invasions via smoke. The towers also served as outposts, where soldiers could be stationed and deployed from.

== Abandonment ==
The Dunhuang Watchtowers were abandoned and reoccupied multiple times over their existence. As a result of two battles occurring in 121 BC and 119 BC, the "Dunhuang Commandery" was established, whose 2000 soldiers were sent to garrison Dunhuang and the fortified beacons which surrounded it. For the next century, Dunhuang and its forts were used as an important military staging ground for the Han Dynasty in its military campaigns further west, ultimately culminating in use at the beginning of the 1st Century AD. Although starting to decline in use and manpower decades before, the military outposts in and around Dunhuang were likely abandoned during the turbulent reign of Wang Mang, sometime between 9–23 AD. Although reoccupied by the 3rd century AD as its own semi-autonomous city state, and again under centralized control by the Tang Dynasty in the 6th Century AD, the watchtowers had since fallen into a state of disrepair, and were not reused by later dynasties.

== See also ==
- Han Dynasty
- Silk Road
- Caravanserai
- Dunhuang
- Great Wall of China
