= Akyrtas =

Ruins of an 8th-century palace complex in Kazakhstan

UNESCO World Heritage Site
- Interactive map of Akyrtas
- Location: Jambyl Region, Kazakhstan
- Part of: Silk Roads: the Routes Network of Chang'an-Tianshan Corridor
- Criteria: (ii), (iii), (v)
- Inscription: 2014 (38th Session)
- Area: 2.5 ha
- Coordinates: 42°58′0″N 71°15′0″E

Akyrtas is the ruins of an 8th-century palace complex in the Jambyl Region of Kazakhstan, about 45 kilometres east of Taraz. Built from large blocks of dark-red sandstone, the complex covers about 2.5 hectares and contains some 70 rooms. It was inscribed as a World Heritage Site in 2014, as part of the Silk Roads: the Routes Network of Chang'an-Tianshan Corridor.

The complex has been called a Buddhist temple and a Nestorian monastery at various points. In 2023 Northedge argued that it is an early Islamic palace built for a Karluk ruler between roughly 780 and 809, noting that the four-iwan plan closely resembles the Al-Ukhaidir Fortress in Iraq and has Umayyad and Abbasid parallels. If so, Akyrtas would be among the oldest archaeological traces of Islam in Kazakhstan. A separate, older theory ties the palace to Qutayba ibn Muslim, the Umayyad general killed in 715, with construction supposedly halted after his death.

Arabic geographical sources mention a settlement called Kasribas at or near the site. Qiu Chuji, who passed through the area in 1222, left the earliest non-Arabic reference. Vasily Bartold and other Russian scholars surveyed the ruins in the late 19th century. Stone blocks were stripped from the site in 1938-1939 for railway construction, causing considerable damage. The A. Kh. Margulan Institute of Archaeology began excavating in the mid-20th century, and a Kazakh-French team under K. M. Baipakov did further fieldwork in 1998.

The main building measures about 142 by 169 metres, with walls 3.5 to 5 metres thick. Individual sandstone blocks weigh around one tonne, some exceed ten. Excavations outside the palace have also turned up a caravanserai, stone quarries, and an underground water-supply system.

== See also ==
- Taraz
- Al-Ukhaidir Fortress
- Battle of Talas
