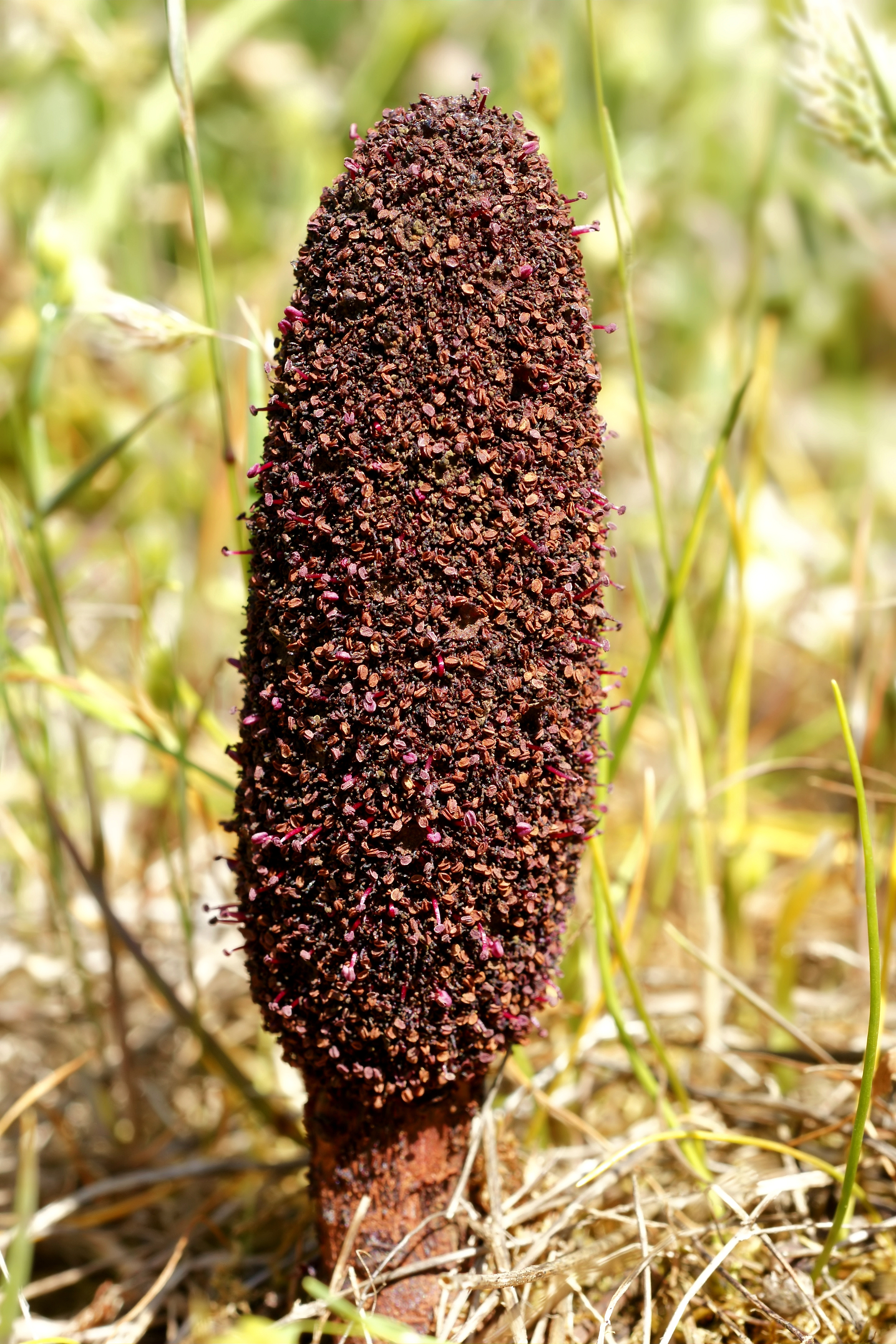

Scientific classification
- Kingdom: Plantae
- Clade: Embryophytes
- Clade: Tracheophytes
- Clade: Angiosperms
- Clade: Eudicots
- Order: Saxifragales
- Family: Cynomoriaceae; Endl. ex Lindl.
- Genus: Cynomorium; L.
- Species: C. coccineum

Binomial name
- Cynomorium coccineum L.

= Cynomorium =

Genus of flowering plants

Cynomorium is a genus of parasitic perennial flowering plants in the family Cynomoriaceae. The genus consists of only one species, Cynomorium coccineum (although one of its subspecies is sometimes treated as a separate species). Its placement in the Saxifragales was resolved in 2016 with the help of nuclear, plastid, and mitochondrial sequences obtained from next-generation sequencing. Common names include the misleading Maltese fungus or Maltese mushroom; also desert thumb, red thumb, tarthuth (Bedouin) and suoyang (Chinese). A rare or local species, it grows in dry, rocky or sandy soils, often in salt marshes or other saline habitats close to the coast. It has had a wide variety of uses in European, Arabian and Chinese herbal medicine.

== Description ==
This plant has no chlorophyll and is unable to photosynthesise. It is a geophyte, spending most of its life underground in the form of a rhizome, which is attached to the roots of its host plant; it is a holoparasite, i.e. totally dependent on its host. The low-growing inflorescence emerges (in spring, following winter rain), on a fleshy, unbranched stem (most of which is underground) with scale-like, membranous leaves. Dark-red or purplish, the inflorescence consists of a dense, erect, club-shaped mass, some 15–30 cm (5.9–11.8 in) long, of minute scarlet flowers, which may be male, female or hermaphrodite. It is pollinated by flies, attracted to the plant by its sweet, slightly cabbage-like odour. Once pollinated, the spike turns black. The fruit is a small, indehiscent nut.

In the Mediterranean region, Cynomorium is a parasite of salt-tolerant plants in the Cistaceae (cistus family) or Amaranthaceae (amaranth family); elsewhere it parasitizes Amaranthaceae, Tamaricaceae (tamarisks) and, in China, Nitrariaceae, especially Nitraria sibirica. Other authorities suggest the host plants are saltbushes (Atriplex species, Amaranthaceae).

DNA studies suggest that Cynomorium is not a member of the Balanophoraceae, as previously thought, but more probably belongs to the Saxifragales, possibly near Crassulaceae (stonecrop family). The issue is complicated by the massive horizontal gene transfer between Cynomorium and its different hosts.

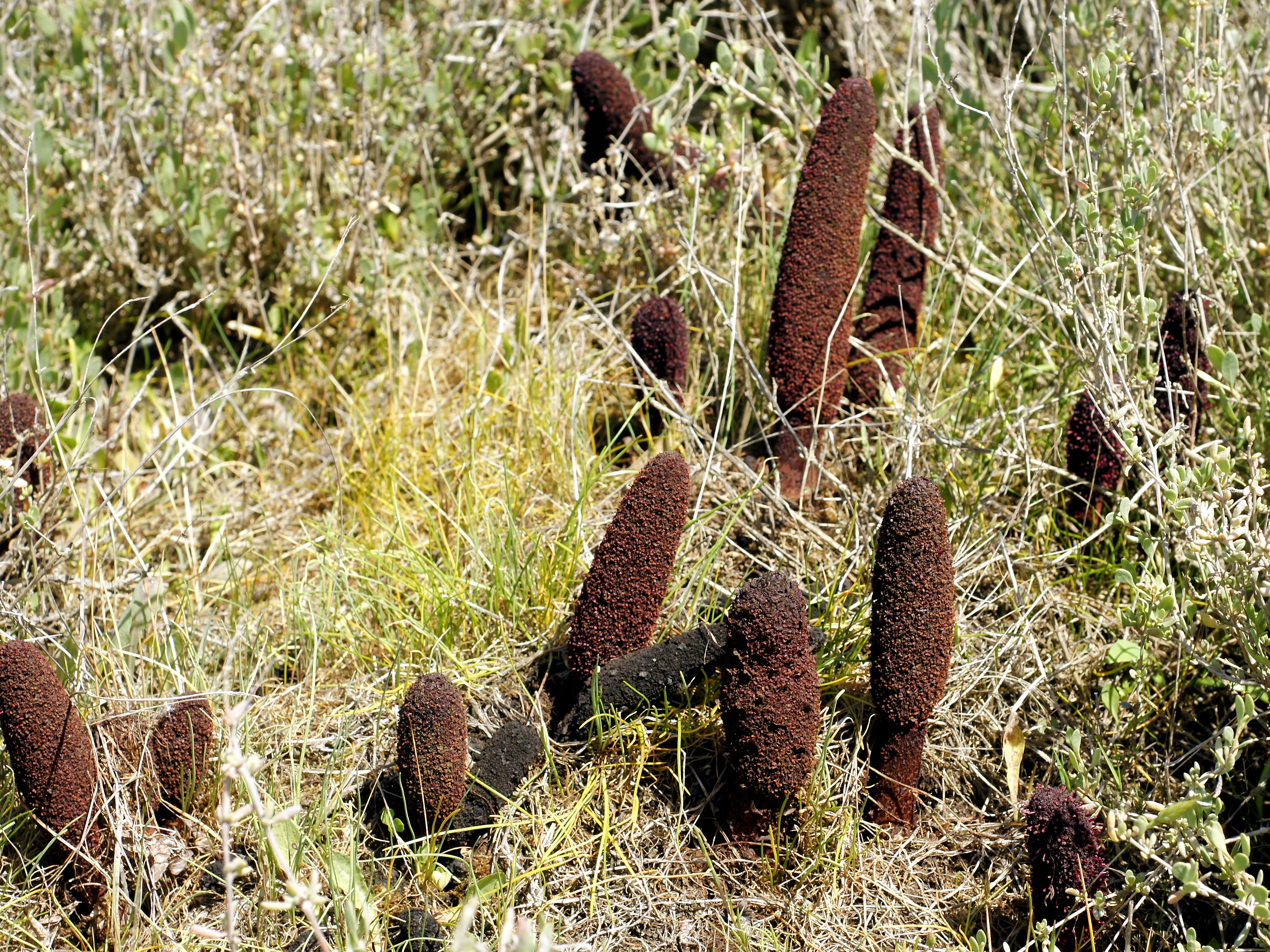
Habitat in Sardinia

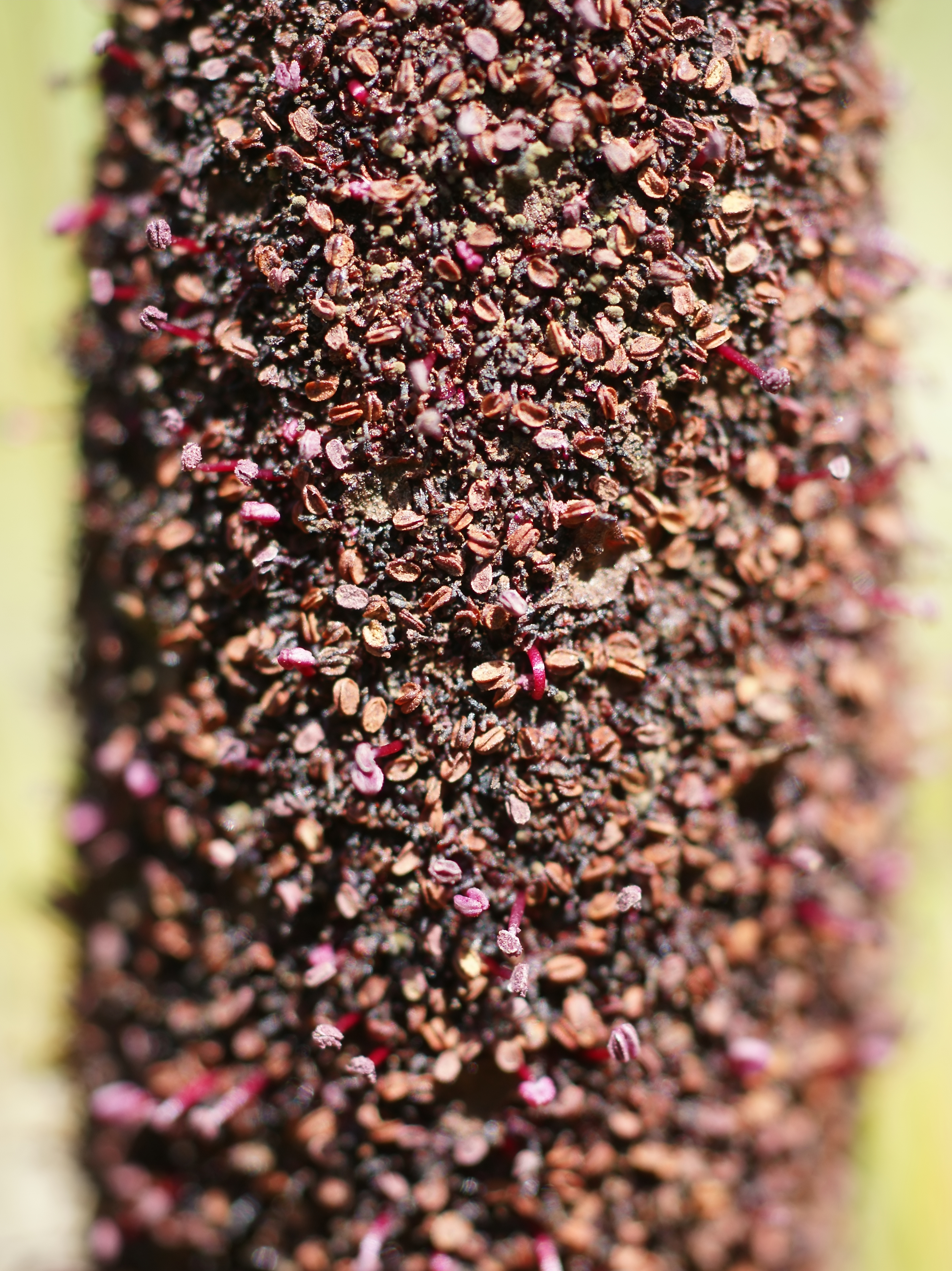
Close-up detail of flowers

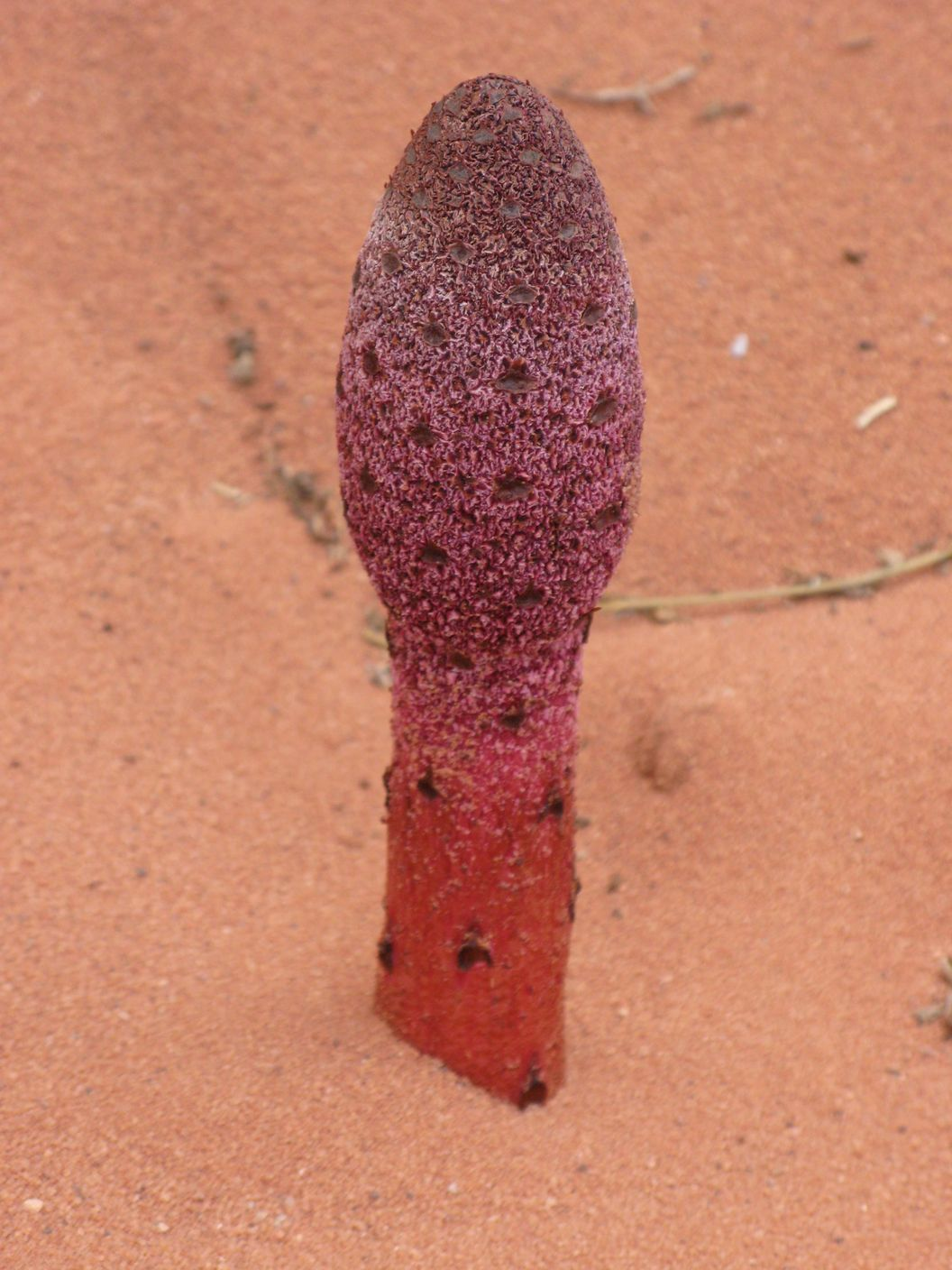
Emerging inflorescence in the desert in Jordan

== Taxonomy ==
Long disputed, Cynomorium was placed in the Saxifragales in 2016, but its placement within that order remains uncertain.

== Distribution ==
Cynomorium coccineum var. coccineum is found from the Atlantic coastal desert in Mauritania and Western Sahara, through Morocco, the Canary Islands, southern Iberia (Portugal and Spain), the Balearic Islands, Algeria, Corsica, Sardinia, Sicily, southern Italy, Malta, Tunisia, Libya, Egypt, the Arabian Peninsula, Somalia, Iran and Afghanistan.

Cynomorium coccineum var. songaricum is found in Central Asia and Mongolia, where it grows at high altitudes. Several authorities consider this to be a separate species, C. songaricum; it is called "suoyang" (Chinese: 鎖陽) in China, where it is extensively collected as a herbal remedy for illnesses including sexual worries and nocturnal emissions.

== History and historical uses ==
Sir David Attenborough suggests that, following the reasoning of the "Doctrine of signatures", the phallic shape of the inflorescence suggested to early herbalists that Cynomorium should be used as a cure for erectile dysfunction and other sexual problems. Its colour suggested that it would cure anaemia and other diseases of the blood. It has been used for similar purposes in the east and west of its range: crusaders carried dried spikes to help them recover from their wounds. Other traditional uses have included treatments for apoplexy, dysentery, sexually transmitted diseases, hypertension, vomiting and irregular menstruation.

The city of Kuyu 苦峪 was also known as Suoyang City (the Chinese name for cynomorium), after the 7th-century general Xue Rengui and his army supposedly survived a siege there by eating the plant. Much later, it was "introduced" (or possibly imported) to China from Mongolia during the Yuan dynasty as a medicinal plant, and is first mentioned by Zhū Dānxī (朱丹溪) in his Supplement and Expansion of Materia Medica (Chinese: 本草衍義補遺; pinyin: Běncǎo Yǎnyì Bǔyí) in 1347. It was an ingredient in his recipe for hidden tiger pills (Chinese: 虎潛丸 or 虎潜丸; pinyin: hǔqián wán), used for impotence and weak legs.

During the 16th century, the Knights of Malta greatly prized the plant and sent samples of it to European royalty. They incorrectly believed it to be a fungus, and it became known as "fungus melitensis", "Maltese mushroom". The Knights jealously guarded "Fungus Rock", a large rock formation, on whose flat top it grew in abundance, just off the coast of Gozo. They even tried smoothing the outcrop's sides to prevent theft of the plants, which was said to be punishable by death. The only access was by a precarious cable car, which was maintained into the early 19th century. The rock is now a nature reserve, so access is still strictly limited.

In the Middle Ages, Arabic physicians called it "tarthuth" and "the treasure of drugs". An aqrabadhin, or medical formulary, compiled by Al-Kindi in the 9th century lists tarthuth as an ingredient in a salve to relieve skin irritation; later, Rhazes (Al-Razi) recommended it to cure piles, nosebleeds, and dysfunctional uterine bleeding. In Saudi Arabia, an infusion made from the ground, dried mature spike has been used to treat colic and stomach ulcers. It was eaten on long journeys by the Bedouin people, who would clean and peel the fresh spikes and eat the crisp white interior, which is said to be succulent and sweet, with a flavour of apples and a pleasantly astringent effect. It is also relished by camels.

It has often been used as a "famine food" (last reported during the 19th century in the Canary Islands). Among many other uses it has been used as a contraceptive, a toothpaste, and a non-fading crimson fabric dye.

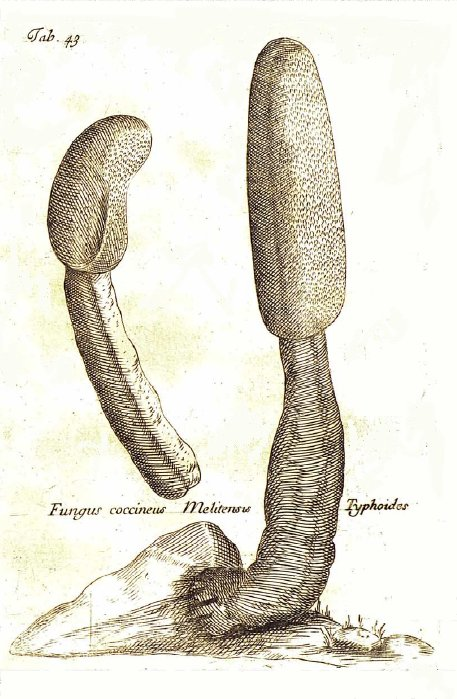
"Fungus coccineus Melitensis Typhoides" from Icones et Descriptiones rariarum plantarum..., Paolo Boccone (1674)

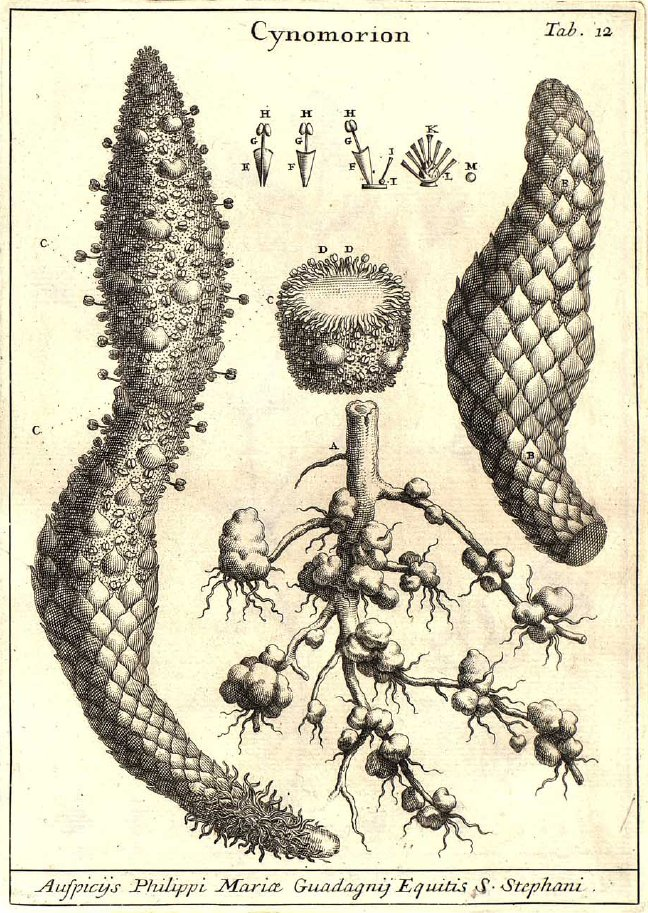
"Cynomorion" from Nova plantarum genera, Pier Antonio Micheli (1729)

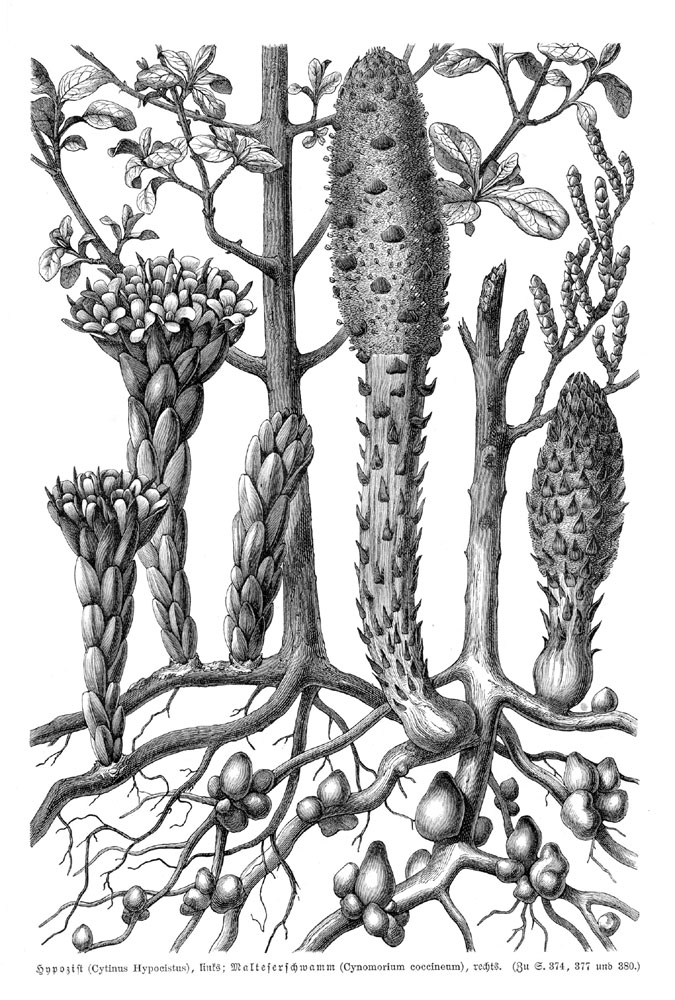
"Malteserschwamm" (with "Cytinus hypocistus" [sic], left) from Pflanzenleben: Erster Band: Der Bau und die Eigenschaften der Pflanzen, by Anton Joseph Kerner von Marilaun and Adolf Hansen (1913)

== Active ingredients ==
Cynomorium contains anthocyanic glycosides, triterpenoid saponins, and lignans.

Cynomorium coccineum var. coccineum from Sardinia was found to contain gallic acid and cyanidin-3-O-glucoside as the main constituents.

== Bibliography ==
- Bellot, Sidonie; Cusimano, Natalie; Luo, Shixiao; Sun, Guiling; Zarre, Shahin; Gröger, Andreas; Temsch, Eva; Renner, Susanne S. (July 2016). "Assembled Plastid and Mitochondrial Genomes, as well as Nuclear Genes, Place the Parasite Family Cynomoriaceae in the Saxifragales". Genome Biology and Evolution. 8 (7): 2214–2230. doi:10.1093/gbe/evw147. PMC 4987112. PMID 27358425.
- Parasitic Plant Connection : Cynomoriaceae (includes distribution map and links to many online photographs)
- eFloras.org, Flora of China : Cynomoriaceae
- eFloras.org, Flora of Pakistan : Cynomoriaceae
- eFloras.org, South China Botanical Garden Herbarium : Cynomoriaceae
- Harvard Flora of China 13:434 (2007)
- RGB Kew, World Checklist of Selected Plant Families : Cynomorium
- DELTA : Cynomoriaceae Lindl. Archived 2007-01-03 at the Wayback Machine
  - See also Balanophoraceae L.C. & A. Rich. Archived 2007-01-03 at the Wayback Machine
- MOBOT : Cynomoriaceae (placed under Saxifragales)
  - MOBOT : Cynomoriaceae (placed under Rosales)
- GRIN : Family: Cynomoriaceae Engl. ex Lindl.
- ITIS : Cynomoriaceae
- NCBI : Cynomoriaceae
- Tropicos: Cynomorium
