= Yumen Pass =

Pass of the Great Wall in China

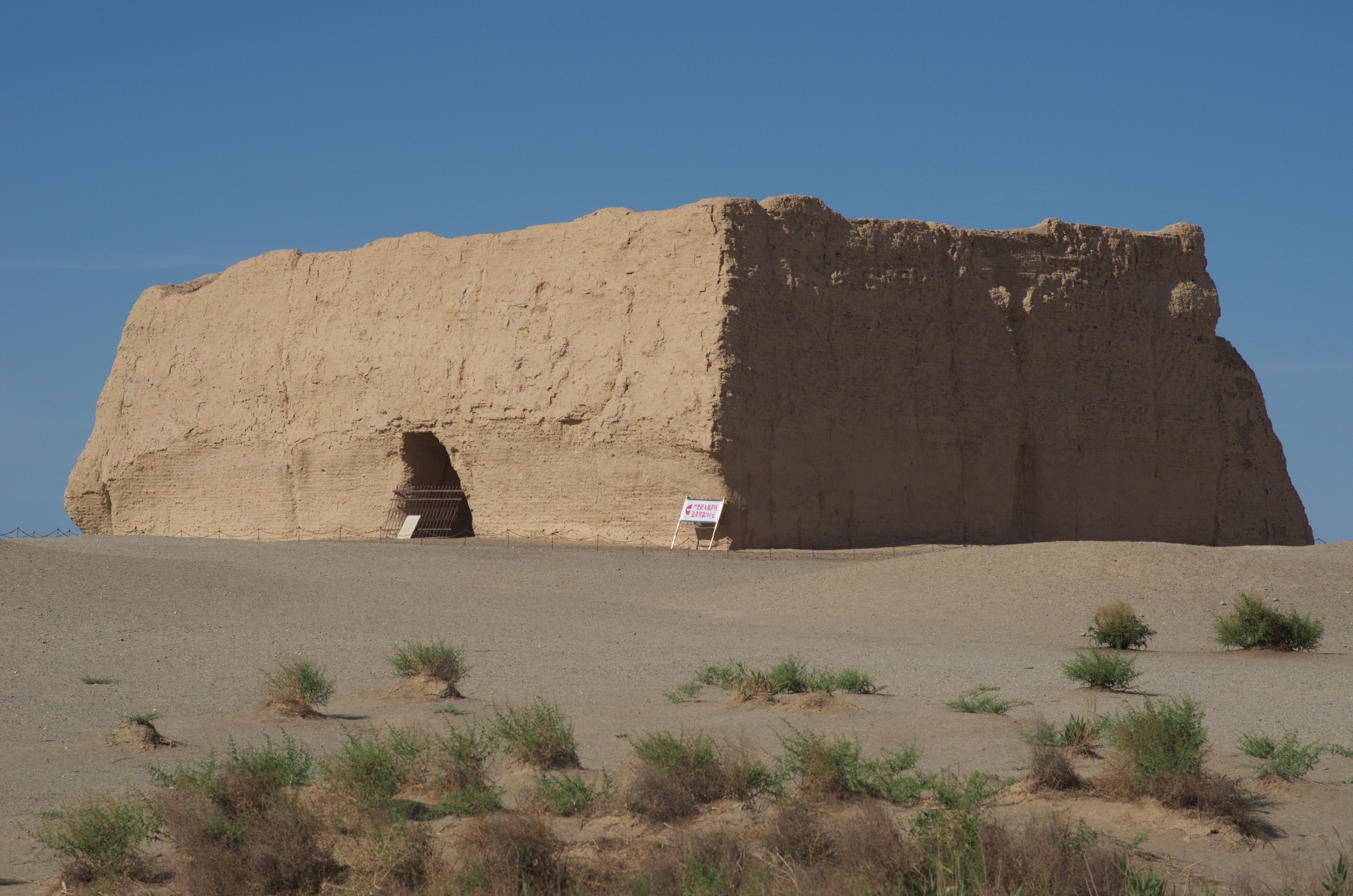
- Ruin of the Small Fangpan Castle at Yumen Pass

- Location within China

Location
- Location: 80 km (50 mi) NW of Dunhuang, Gansu, China
- Coordinates: 40°21′12.6″N 93°51′50.5″E

Chinese name
- Simplified Chinese: 玉门关
- Traditional Chinese: 玉門關
- Literal meaning: Jade Gate
Transcriptions
Standard Mandarin
- Hanyu Pinyin: Yùmén Guān

Yumen Pass (simplified Chinese: 玉门关; traditional Chinese: 玉門關; pinyin: Yùmén Guān; Uyghur: قاش قوۋۇق, Qash Qowuq), or Jade Gate or Pass of the Jade Gate, is the name of a pass of the Great Wall located west of Dunhuang in today's Gansu Province of China. During the Han dynasty (202 BC – AD 220), this was a pass through which the Silk Road passed, and was the one road connecting Central Asia with East Asia (China), the former called the Western Regions. Just to the south was the Yangguan pass, which was also an important point on the Silk Road. These passes, along with other sites along the Silk Road, were inscribed in 2014 on the UNESCO World Heritage List as the Silk Roads: the Routes Network of Chang'an-Tianshan Corridor World Heritage Site. The pass is at an elevation of 1400 meters.

== Etymology ==
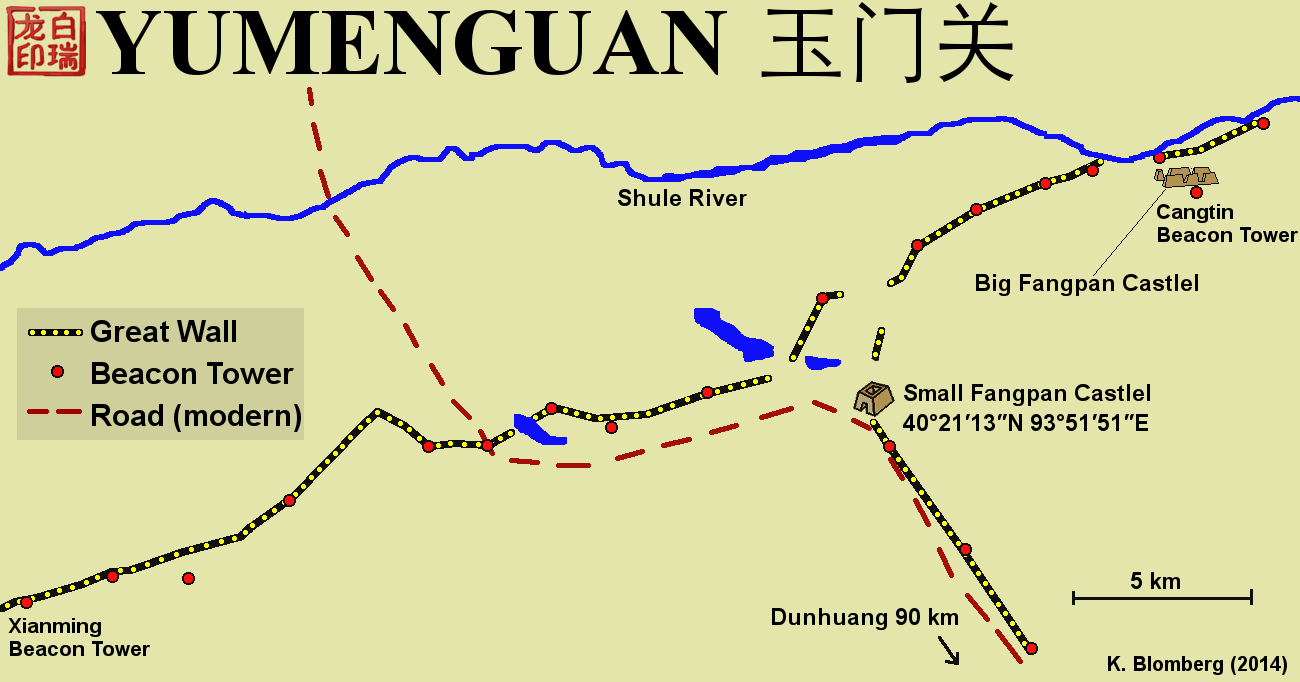
Map over Yumen Pass

Although the Chinese guan is usually translated simply as "pass", its more specific meaning is a "frontier pass" to distinguish it from an ordinary pass through the mountains. Yumen guan 玉門關 and Yang guan 陽關 are derived from: yu 玉 = 'jade' + men 門 = 'gate', 'door'; and yang 陽 = 'sunny side', 'south side of a hill', 'north side of a river,' and guan 關 = 'frontier-passes'.

It is not to be confused with the city Yumen (玉門, literally Jade Gate) in Gansu, China. Although both are within the same Jiuquan "prefecture-level city" (a multi-county administrative unit) of Gansu province, Yumen Pass is located some 400 km (250 mi) to the west of its namesake city.

== History ==
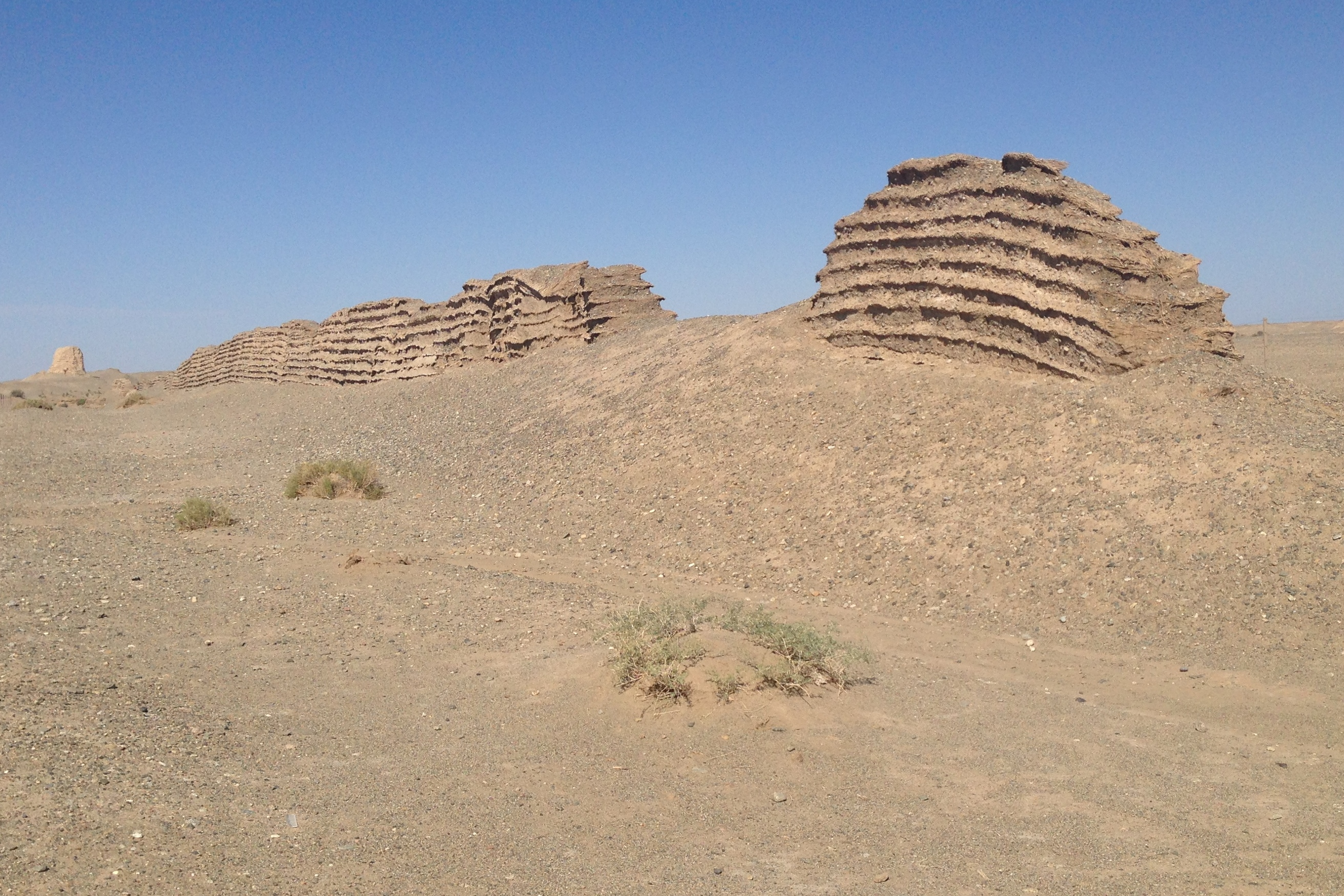
Han-period Great Wall at Yumen Pass

Yumen Pass was one of the most famous passes leading to the north and west from Chinese territory. During the Early Han, "a defensive line was established from Jiuquan (known as the Dunhuang Watchtowers or Beacons) in the Gansu Corridor west to the Jade Gate Pass at its end."

Travellers to 'The Western Regions' (西域, Xiyu) left China through the famous Yumenguan 玉門關, or 'Jade Gate Frontier-post,' named for the many jade caravans that passed through it. The original Jade Gate was erected by Emperor Wudi (Emperor Wu of Han) soon after 121 BCE and its ruins may still be seen about 80 kilometres (50 mi) to the northwest of Dunhuang which was, until the 6th century, the final outpost of Chinese territory for caravans on their long caravan journeys to India, Parthia, and the Roman Empire.

The remains of these two important Han-dynasty gates are about 68 kilometres (42 mi) apart, at either end of the Dunhuang extension of the Great Wall. Until the Tang dynasty, when the gates fell into disuse, all caravans travelling through Dunhuang were required to pass through one of these gates, then the westernmost passes of China. Yumenguan lies about 80 kilometres (50 mi) northwest of Dunhuang. It was originally called the 'Square City', but because the great jade caravans from Khotan entered through its portals, it became known as the Jade Gate Pass. In the third and fourth centuries turmoil swept through Central Asia, disrupting overland trade, and the sea route via India began to supplant it. By the sixth century, as caravans favoured the northern route via Hami, the pass was abandoned. In 1907, Sir Aurel Stein found bamboo slips naming the site as Yumenguan, and in 1944 Chinese archaeologists discovered relics that confirmed this. With its 10-metre-high (33-foot) mud walls pierced by four gateways, the square enclosure covered more than 600 square metres (718 square yards) in the midst of unbounded desolation. Yanguan lies 75 kilometres (47 mi) southwest of Dunhuang but consists of only the ruins of a high beacon tower.

— Bonavia & Baumer (2004), pp. 176, 178. Quoted in Hill (2009), p. 138.
