= Krasnaya Rechka, Kyrgyzstan =

Krasnaya Rechka Красная Речка
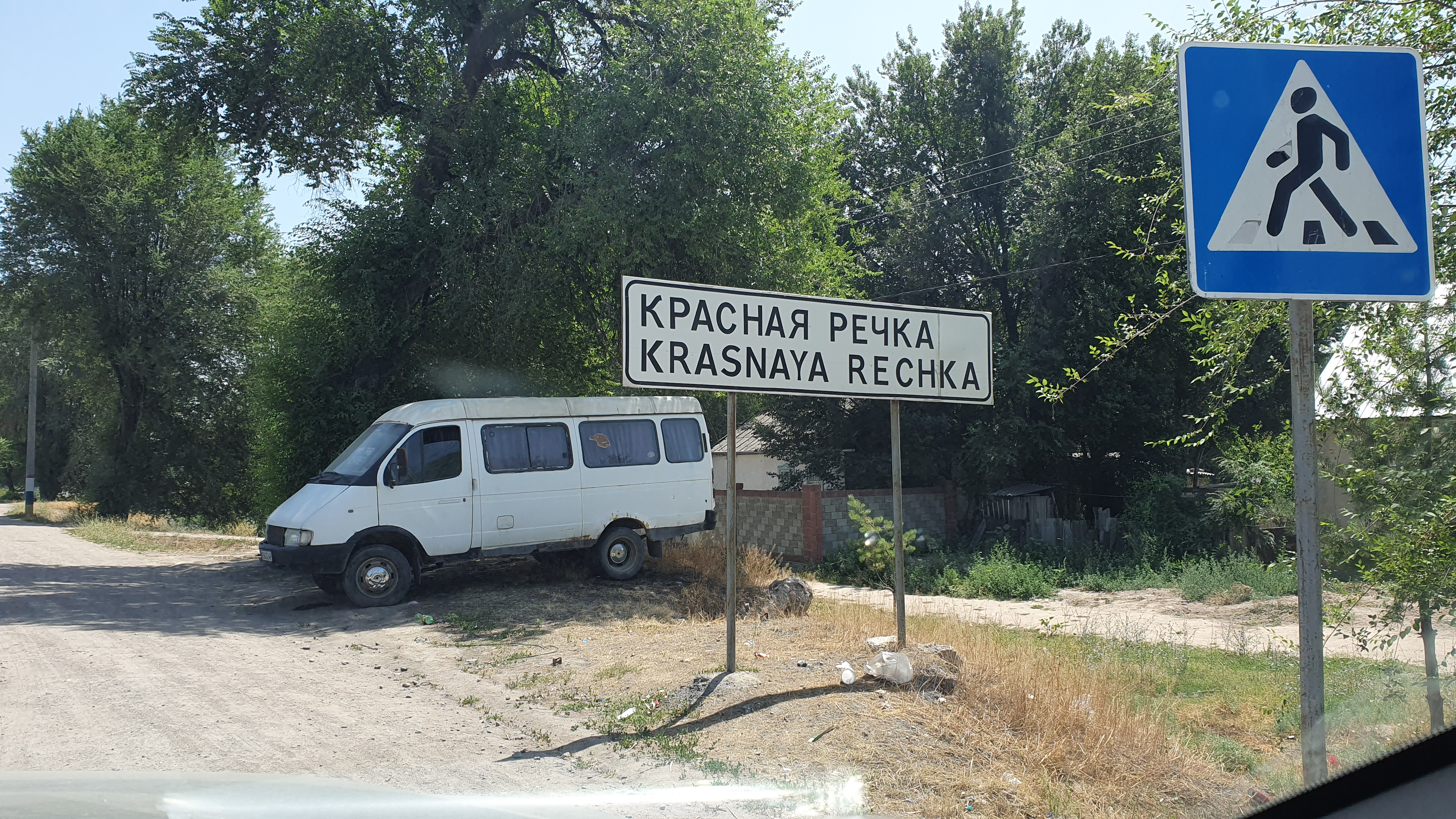

- Location within Kyrgyzstan
- Coordinates: 42°54′0″N 74°57′36″E
- Country: Kyrgyzstan
- Region: Chüy Region
- District: Ysyk-Ata District
- Elevation: 737 m (2,418 ft)

Population (2021)
  - Total: 7,613

Krasnaya Rechka (Russian: Красная Речка, lit. 'Red River') is a village in the Chüy Region of Kyrgyzstan 8 km east of Kant. Its population was 7,613 in 2021. Nearby is the ruined Sogdian silk road settlement of Navekat ('new town'). It was active between the 6th and 12th centuries and was the largest town in the valley at the time. Buddhist, Nestorian, Manichaean, Chinese and Sanskrit remains have been found.

Though there is little notably visible on the surface, parts of the Buddhist Temple II site have been conserved. A large eight-metre long reclining Buddha, decorated, with its pedestal, in red paint, was discovered during excavations in 1961. It was sent to the Hermitage Museum for conservation, where, in 2004, it was noted only a small section had been treated - the rest still in their original transportation packing.

== Population ==
Historical population
Year	Pop.	±% p.a.
2009	7,274	—
2021	7,613	+0.38%
Note: resident population; Sources:
