= Guazhou County =

Coordinates: 39°50′0″N 97°34′0″E

Guazhou County 瓜州县
- County
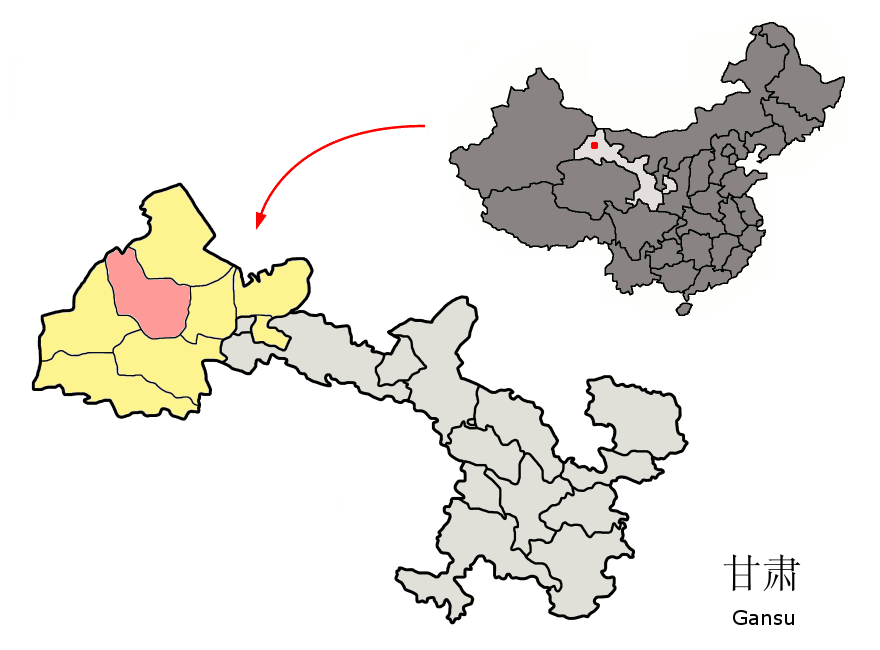
- Guazhou (pink) within Jiuquan prefecture (yellow) within Gansu (grey)
- Country: China
- Province: Gansu
- Prefecture-level city: Jiuquan
- Seat: Yuanquan

Area
  - Total: 24,100 km^{2} (9,300 sq mi)

Population (2018)
  - Total: 128,133
  - Density: 5.32/km^{2} (13.8/sq mi)
- Time zone: UTC+8 (China Standard)
- Postal code: 736100

Guazhou County (Chinese: 瓜州县; pinyin: Guāzhōu Xiàn), formerly Anxi County (安西县; Ānxī Xiàn) until 2006, is a county in the northwest of Gansu province, China. It is under the administration of Jiuquan City.

== History ==
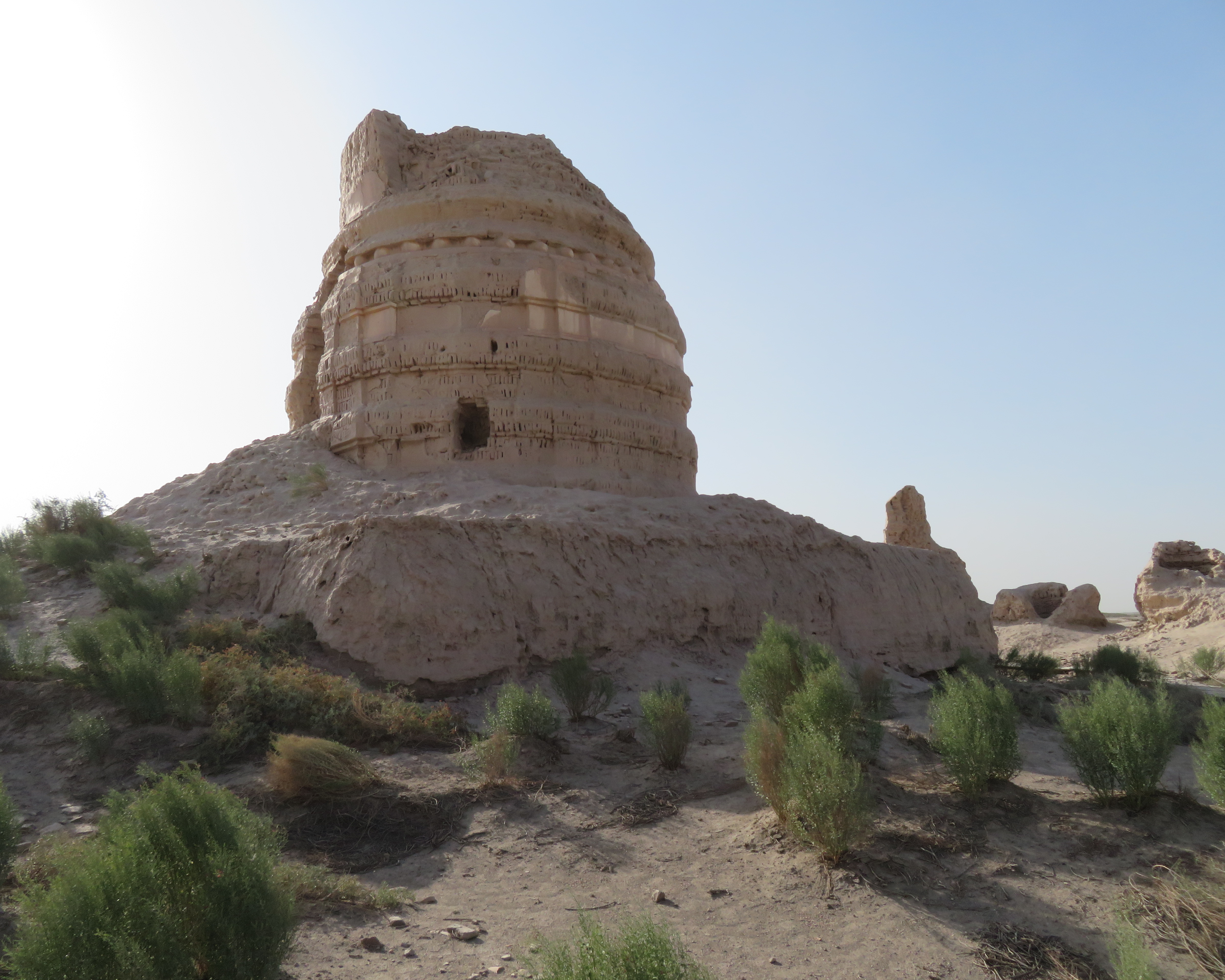
Ancient city of Suoyang

Emperor Wudi Of Han (140-87 BCE) had the Great Wall extended northwestward all the way to the Gate of Jade (Yumen Pass), the westernmost garrison town near Dunhuang. He then set up a system of garrisons all along this part of the Great Wall and put its headquarters in a town called Anxi (literally "Tranquil West") and where the northern and southern Silk Routes historically diverged. The name Guazhou (land/prefecture of melons) has a long contentious history; the name first appeared in records from the Warring States period, but Chinese historians have debated (since the 3rd century) whether it referred to a region in modern-day Gansu or Shaanxi. From Northern Wei to Sui dynasty, Guazhou Prefecture contained both modern-day Dunhuang and Guazhou counties; in the Tang dynasty, the western region surrounding Dunhuang was renamed "Western Shazhou" while the region around Anxi was named Guazhou, with both falling under the administrative unit of "Shazhou". Later, Shazhou became the exclusive name of the region around Dunhuang. The naming of these two regions (Shazhou and Guazhou) largely persisted till the Qing dynasty. In the 18th century, the Qing dynasty replaced the regional names "Shazhou" and "Guazhou" with the names of their largest cities, Dunhuang and Anxi, respectively. Since the modern era, Dunhuang County continues to be the name for the western county; however, Anxi County decided to revert to the Guazhou name in 2006 due to its greater recognizability in historical texts, with tourism in mind.

== Administrative divisions ==
Guazhou County is subdivided to 9 towns, 1 ethnic town, 2 townships, 3 ethnic townships and 1 other.

Towns

- Yuanquan (渊泉镇)
- Liuyuan (柳园镇)
- Sandaogou (三道沟镇)
- Nancha (南岔镇)
- Suoyang (锁阳城镇)
- Guazhou (瓜州镇)
- Xihu (西湖镇)
- Hedong (河东镇)
- Shuangta (双塔镇)

Ethnic towns

- Yaozhanzi Dongxiang Ethnic Town (腰站子东乡族镇)

Townships

- Bulongji Township (布隆吉乡)
- Lianghu Township (梁湖乡)

Ethnic townships

- Qidun Hui and Dongxiang Ethnic Township (七墩回族东乡族乡)
- Guangzhi Tibetan Ethnic Township (广至藏族乡)
- Shahe Hui Ethnic Township (沙河回族乡)

Others

- State-owned Xiaowan Farm (国营小宛农场)

== Climate ==
Climate data for Guazhou, elevation 1,171 m (3,842 ft), (1991–2020 normals, extremes 1991–present)
Month	Jan	Feb	Mar	Apr	May	Jun	Jul	Aug	Sep	Oct	Nov	Dec	Year
Record high °C (°F)	13.8 (56.8)	19.7 (67.5)	27.4 (81.3)	36.9 (98.4)	38.4 (101.1)	38.7 (101.7)	42.1 (107.8)	38.7 (101.7)	36.7 (98.1)	31.3 (88.3)	21.0 (69.8)	13.7 (56.7)	42.1 (107.8)
Mean daily maximum °C (°F)	−1.1 (30.0)	5.7 (42.3)	13.7 (56.7)	21.7 (71.1)	27.2 (81.0)	31.4 (88.5)	33.0 (91.4)	31.6 (88.9)	26.8 (80.2)	19.0 (66.2)	8.8 (47.8)	0.1 (32.2)	18.2 (64.7)
Daily mean °C (°F)	−9.3 (15.3)	−3.2 (26.2)	4.7 (40.5)	12.9 (55.2)	18.9 (66.0)	23.7 (74.7)	25.3 (77.5)	23.5 (74.3)	17.5 (63.5)	8.8 (47.8)	−0.1 (31.8)	−7.8 (18.0)	9.6 (49.2)
Mean daily minimum °C (°F)	−15.3 (4.5)	−10.1 (13.8)	−2.7 (27.1)	4.9 (40.8)	10.8 (51.4)	15.9 (60.6)	18.2 (64.8)	16.7 (62.1)	10.4 (50.7)	1.8 (35.2)	−6.1 (21.0)	−13.4 (7.9)	2.6 (36.7)
Record low °C (°F)	−25.0 (−13.0)	−25.7 (−14.3)	−16.2 (2.8)	−8.6 (16.5)	−2.9 (26.8)	4.5 (40.1)	9.6 (49.3)	5.3 (41.5)	−5.9 (21.4)	−9.4 (15.1)	−22.1 (−7.8)	−29.0 (−20.2)	−29.0 (−20.2)
Average precipitation mm (inches)	1.5 (0.06)	0.8 (0.03)	2.9 (0.11)	3.6 (0.14)	4.6 (0.18)	8.4 (0.33)	10.1 (0.40)	9.8 (0.39)	3.7 (0.15)	1.9 (0.07)	1.3 (0.05)	2.1 (0.08)	50.7 (1.99)
Average precipitation days (≥ 0.1 mm)	2.1	0.8	1.6	1.6	2.2	3.2	4.2	3.6	1.9	0.9	1.0	2.4	25.5
Average snowy days	3.9	1.2	1.6	0.4	0	0	0	0	0	0.2	1.5	3.5	12.3
Average relative humidity (%)	55	39	32	28	28	36	43	43	41	41	49	57	41
Mean monthly sunshine hours	210.1	216.1	259.1	280.1	311.5	300.9	302.8	297.8	281.6	266.0	216.6	193.7	3,136.3
Percentage possible sunshine	70	71	69	70	69	67	67	71	77	79	74	68	71
Source: China Meteorological Administration

== Economy ==
The county's location is ideally suited for wind farms, earning the nickname "world's wind warehouse". From the east the wind blows through a high, narrow valley formed by the Qilian and Beishan mountains, reaching 8.3 metres per second and energy density of 703 watts per cubic metre.

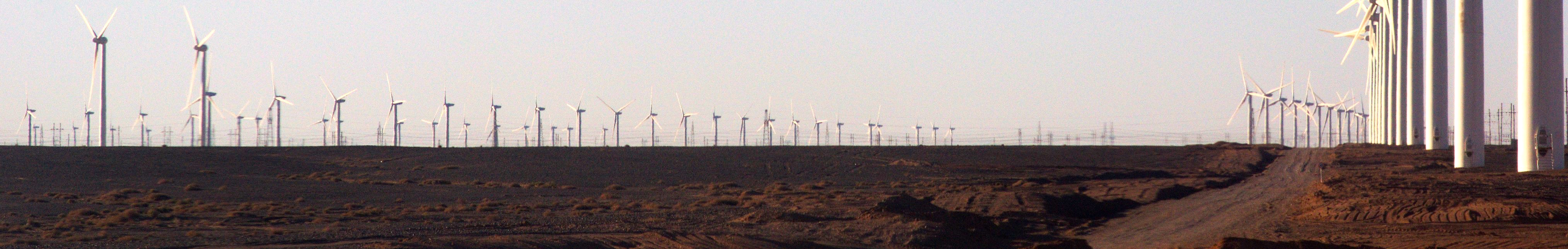
A local windfarm.

== Transport ==
The mainline Lanxin Railway and branch line Dunhuang Railway intersect at Liugou Railway Station in the county. Xiaowan and Guazhou are the two other stations on the Dunhuang Railway located in the county.

There are two national highways running through the country, China National Highway 215 (Hongliuyuan) and China National Highway 312 (Hongliuyuan).

== See also ==
- List of administrative divisions of Gansu
- Suoyang City
- Yulin Caves
