= Dunhuang–Golmud railway =

Railway line in China

Dunhuang–Golmud railway 敦格铁路

Overview
- Status: Operational
- Locale: China: Gansu; Qinghai
- Termini: Dunhuang railway station; Golmud railway station

Service
- Type: Heavy rail
- System: China Railway
- Operator: China Railway Qingzang Group

History
- Opened: 2019

Technical
- Line length: 617 km (383 mi)
- Number of tracks: 1 (Single-track railway)
- Track gauge: 1,435 mm (4 ft 8 1/2 in) standard gauge
- Minimum radius: 800 m (2,625 ft)
- Electrification: Overhead line 25 kV, 50 Hz
- Operating speed: 120km/h
- Highest elevation: 1.3%

The Dunhuang–Golmud railway or Dunge railway (Chinese: 敦格铁路; pinyin: Dūn–Gé Tiělù) is a railway between Dunhuang, Gansu and Golmud, Qinghai in Northwestern China. The 617 km (383 mi) railway from Dunhuang to Golmud consists of two parts: an existing section of the Qinghai–Tibet railway from Golmud to Dachaidan East station, and a newly built 509 km (316 mi) single-track electrified rail line connecting Dachaidan East station to Dunhuang, following a route similar to that of China National Highway 215. The railway allows passenger trains to run at speeds up to 120 km/h (75 mph) and can carry freight trains of up to 4000 tonnes.

The construction of the line began in December 2012 and finished in December 2019. Since Dunhuang, located in the westernmost part of Gansu, is already connected to the Lanzhou–Xinjiang railway by the Liugou–Dunhuang branch (the Liudun railway, 柳敦铁路), the Dunhuang–Golmud link establishes a direct connection between Xinjiang and Tibet Autonomous Region. Provisions is made for upgrading to double-track railway in the future.

== Engineering challenges ==
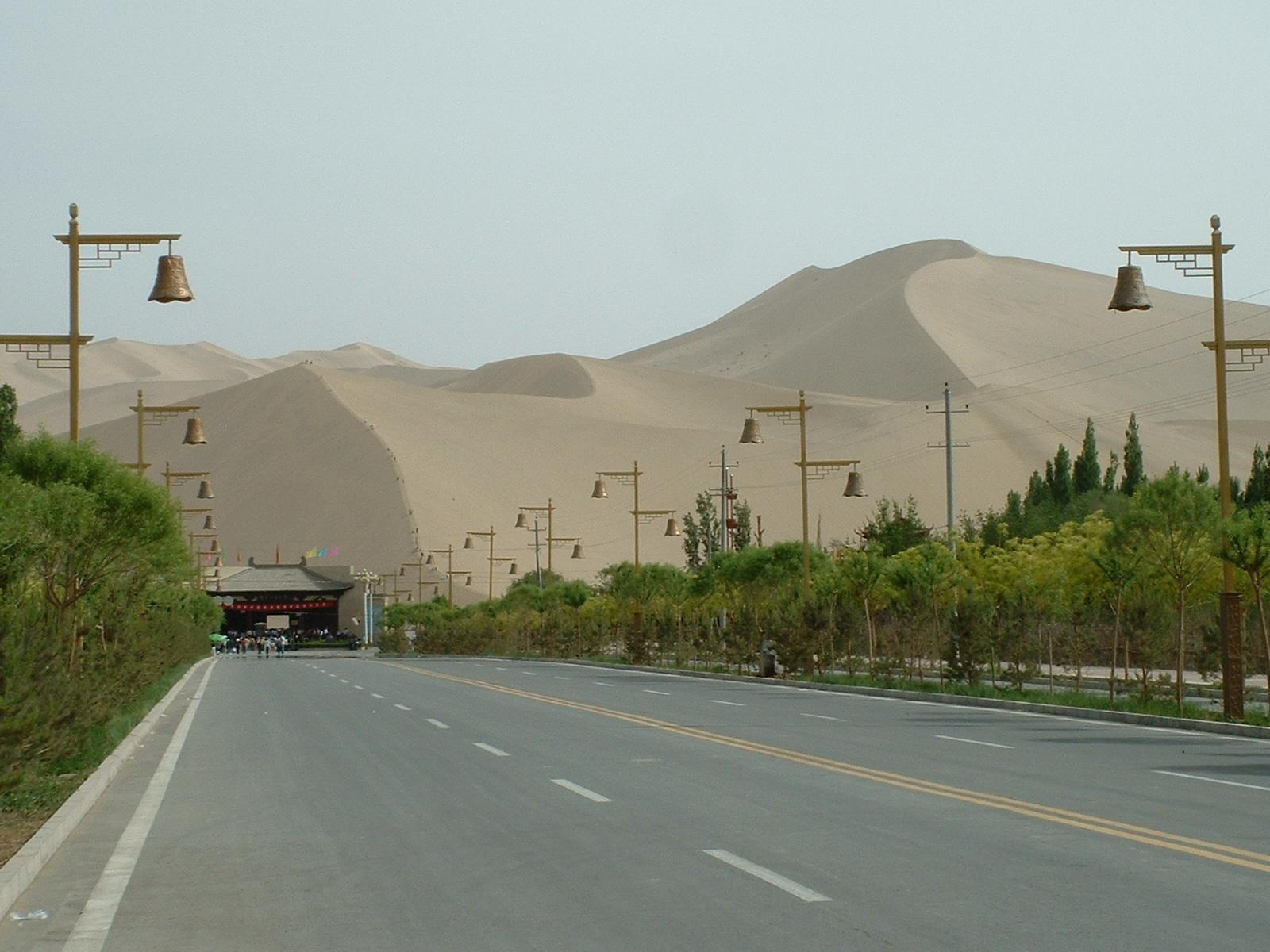
The "megadunes" near Dunhuang

Around Shashangou, between Dunhuang and the Altyn-Tagh–Qilian mountain system, the railway crosses the eastern edge of the Kumtag Desert. There was a concern that the "megadunes" characteristic of this area may shift, burying the railway. However, geological research indicated that the "megadunes" are mostly formed by solid subsoil, rather than just sand. Although there is still the issue of drifting sand, it is thought by the experts that the sand is mostly blown along the direction of the future railway rather than across it, and can be handled with certain precautions.

The railway has 9 tunnels, with the total length of 32.62 km.
