= Dunhuang Museum =

Museum in Dunhuang, China

- 敦煌博物馆
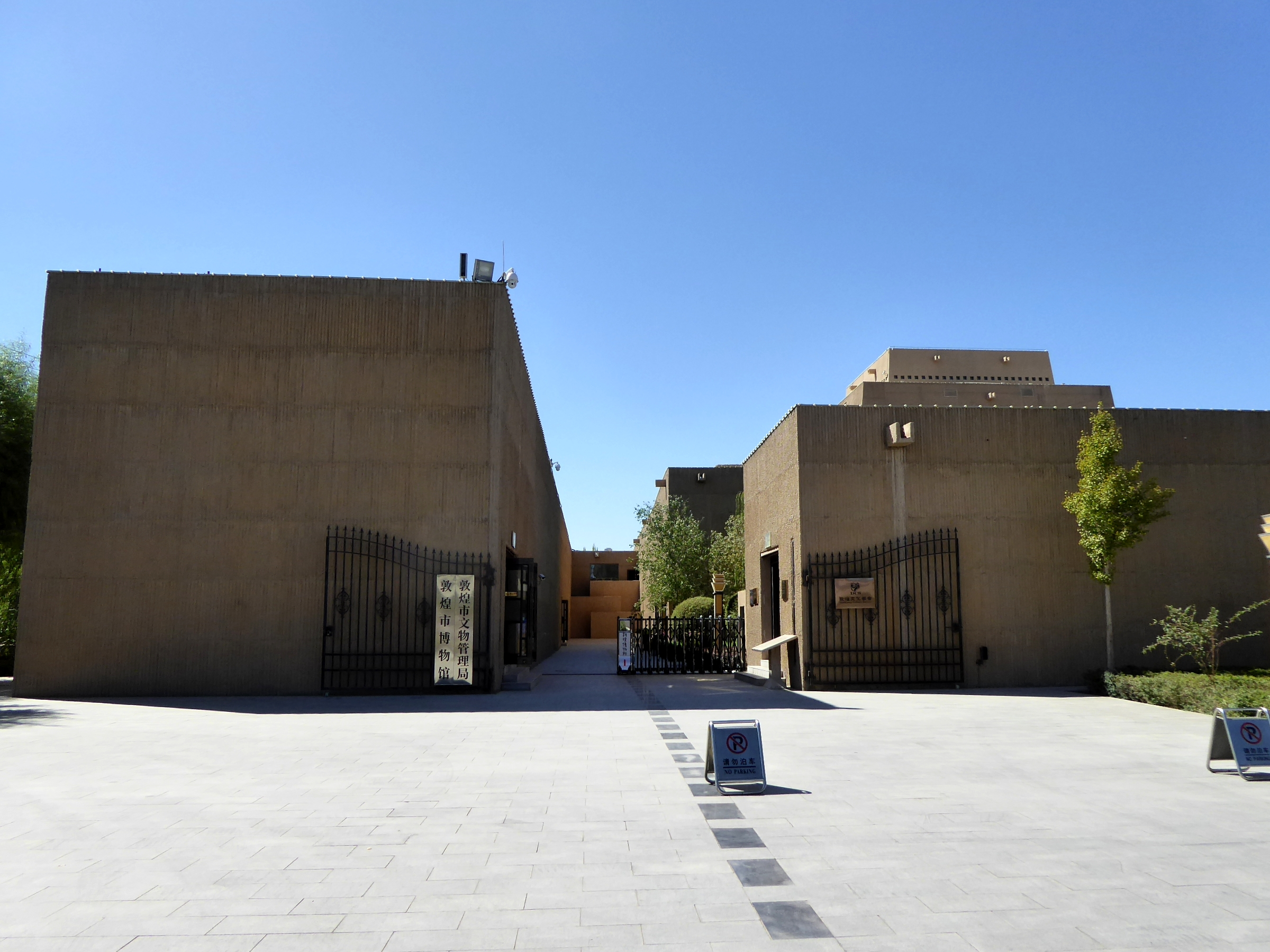
- View of the museum
- Location: Dunhuang, Gansu, China
- Coordinates: 40.12863°N 94.66041°E
- Collections: Local historical objects

Dunhuang Museum is a museum in Dunhuang, Gansu, China.

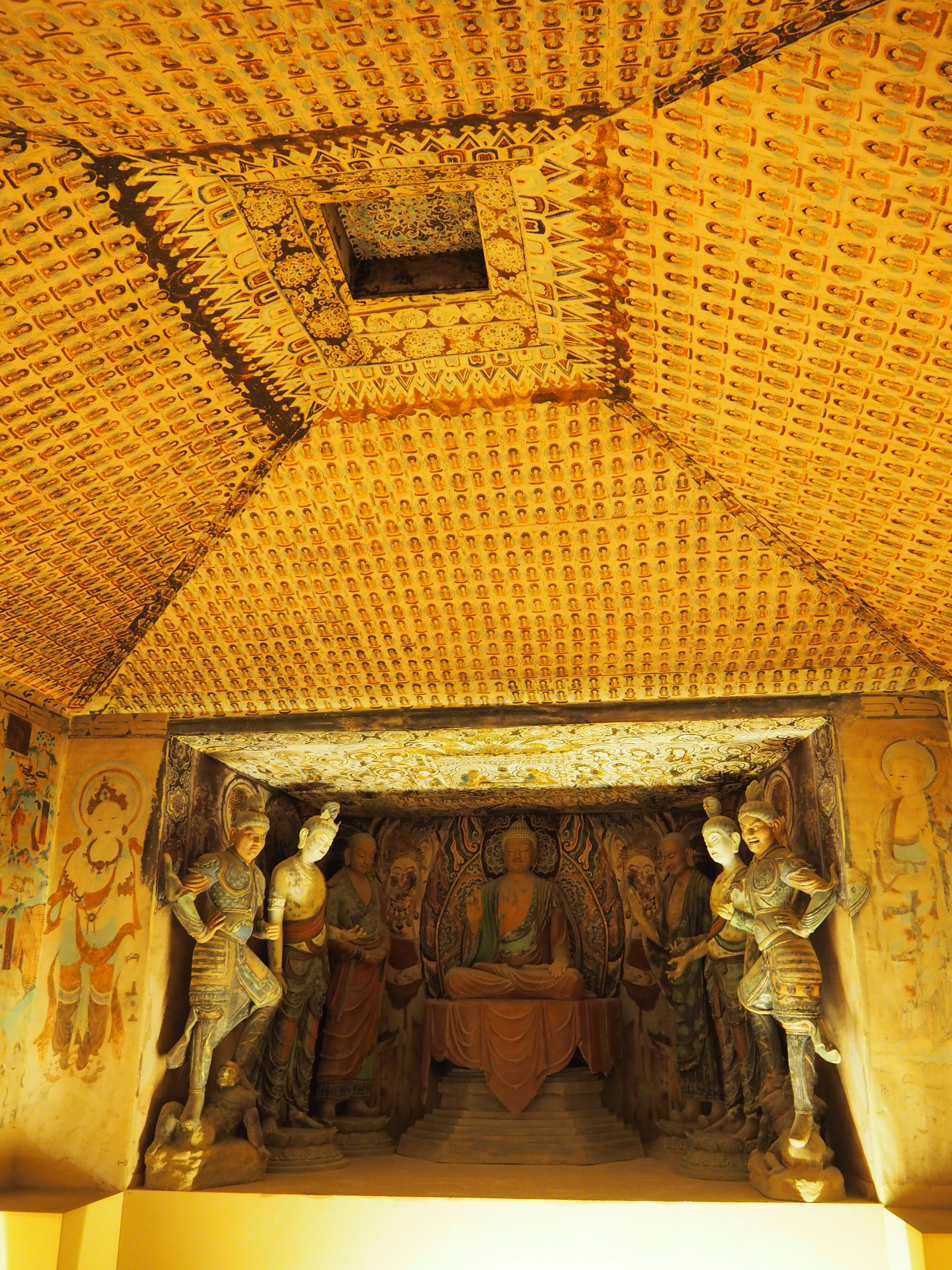
Reproduction of a cave in the museum

The museum contains a number of Chinese and Tibetan items, such as manuscripts from Cave 17 of the Mogao Caves, and domestic items. There are three exhibition parts in the museum covering Cave 18 of the Mogao Caves, tombs of early Chinese dynasties, and brocade, grosgrain, silk, etc.

== See also ==
- List of museums in China
- Mogao Caves
- Singing Sand Dunes
