= Dunhuang railway station =

Railway station in Dunhuang, China

Dunhuang 敦煌
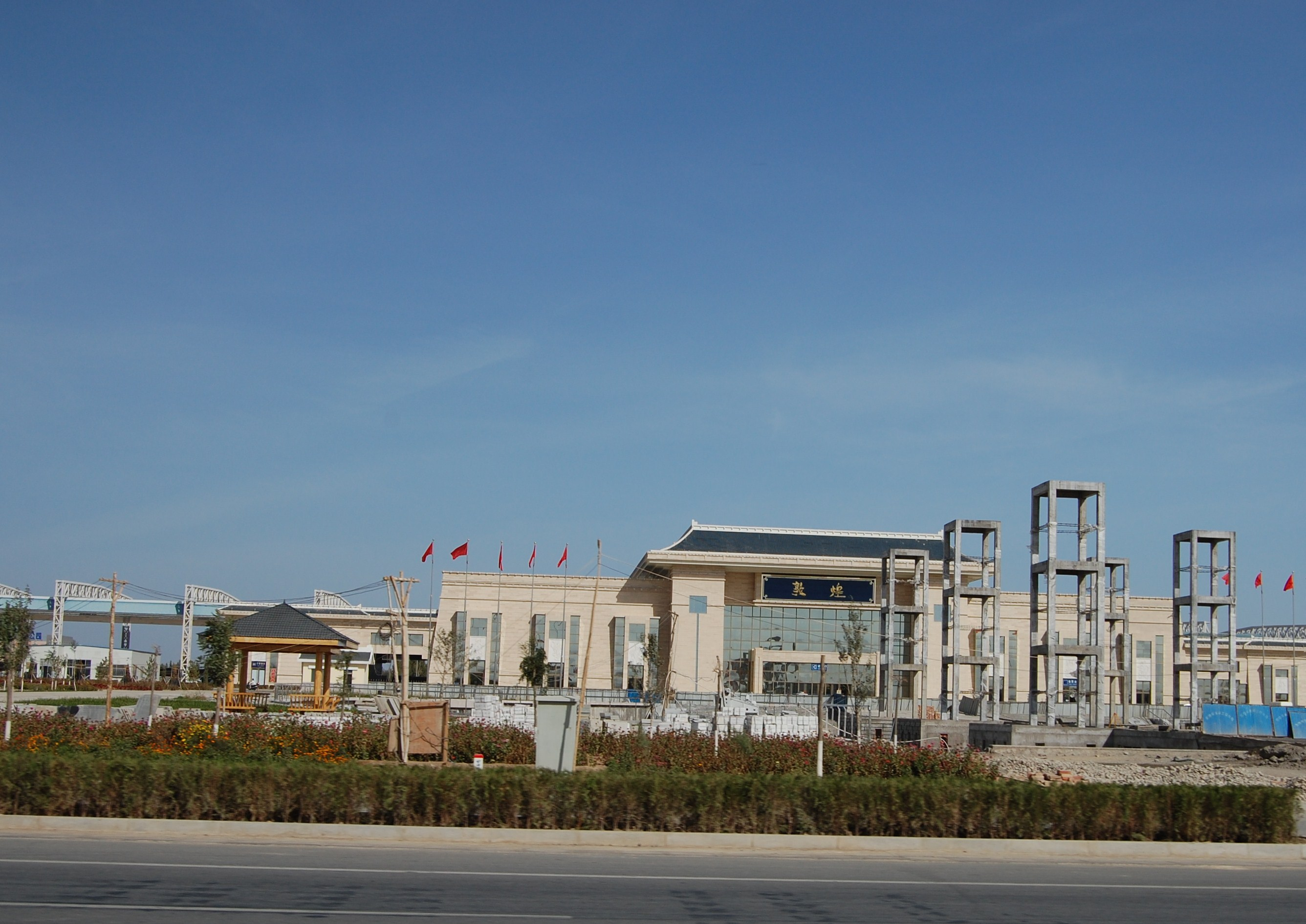

General information
- Location: Dunhuang, Jiuquan, Gansu; China
- Coordinates: 40°10′4″N 94°47′0.5″E
- Owner: China Railway Lanzhou Group
- Operator: China Railway Lanzhou Group
- Lines: Dunhuang railway Dunhuang–Golmud railway
- Platforms: 2

Other information
- Station code: 42104
Location

Dunhuang railway station (Chinese: 敦煌站; pinyin: Dūnhuáng zhàn) is 4.5 kilometers from the downtown area of Dunhuang, between the existing national highway and the Dunhuang railway on the north side. It faces the road leading to Mogao Grottoes in the south. The station is under the jurisdiction of China Railway Lanzhou Group.

The station was built in 2006 and designed to reflect the architecture of desert caravanserai - the towers, the inclined walls and large roofs of the city walls as well as its Han and Tang Dynasty frescoes. The station has a built area of 10,865 square meters, with two platforms to accommodate China Railways's high-speed trains, eight arrival and departure gates, and a capacity for 8,000 passengers.

In December 2019, a new 671 km Dunhuang–Golmud railway was completed, providing a new connection between the Xinjiang Uygur Autonomous Region and Tibet.

== Passenger train destinations ==
Currently, six passenger trains are handled daily. The destinations are as follows:

Railway bureau	Train number	Destination
Lanzhou Railway Bureau	K43	Beijing
Lanzhou Railway Bureau	K369	Xi'an
Lanzhou Railway Bureau	K9699、7537	Jiayuguan
Lanzhou Railway Bureau	Y673（not daily）	Tianshui
Lanzhou Railway Bureau	K9669、Y669	Lanzhou
Lanzhou Railway Bureau	Y677（not daily）	Yinchuan
