= Crescent Lake (Dunhuang) =

Lake in Dunhuang, Gansu Province, China

Yueyaquan
- Crescent Lake
- 月牙泉 (Chinese)
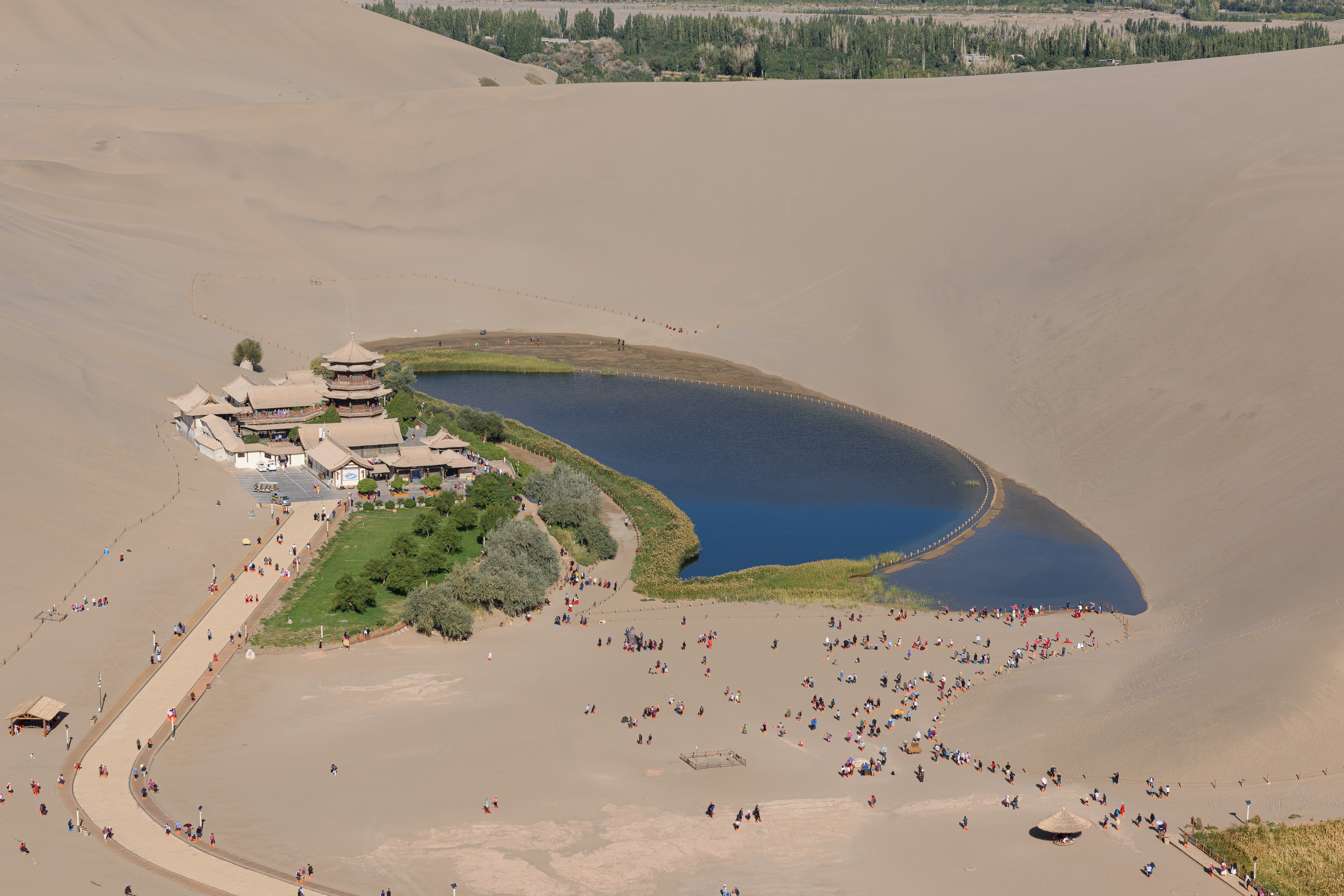
- The lake and pavilion in 2023

- Location within Gansu Location within China
- Location: Gansu
- Coordinates: 40°5′12″N 94°40′10″E
- Basin countries: China
- Surface area: 1.37 acres (0.55 ha)
- Average depth: 4–5 m (1960); 0.9 m (1990s)
- Max. depth: 7.5 m (1960); 1.3 m (1990s)

Yueyaquan (Chinese: 月牙泉; pinyin: Yuèyá Quán) is a crescent-shaped lake in an oasis in the Singing Sand Dunes, 6 km south of the city of Dunhuang in Gansu Province, China.

== History ==
The lake was named Yueyaquan in the Qing Dynasty. Mildred Cable and Francesca French visited the lake during their travels in the region in 1932 and recorded their impressions in their book The Gobi Desert: "All around us we saw tier on tier of lofty sand-hills, giving the lie to our quest, yet when, with a final desperate effort, we hoisted ourselves over the last ridge and looked down on what lay beyond, we saw the lake below, and its beauty was entrancing."

According to measurements made in 1960, the average depth of the lake was 4 to 5 metres (13 to 16 ft), with a maximum depth of 7.5 metres (25 ft). In the following 40 years, the depth of the lake declined by more than 7.6 metres (25 ft). In the early 1990s, it had shrunk to an average depth of one meter. In 2006, the local government with help of the central government started to fill the lake and restore its depth; its depth and size have been growing yearly since then. Proposed groundwater diversions are modeled to raise the water table and level of the lake.

== Tourism ==
The lake and the surrounding deserts are very popular with tourists, who are sand sledding, offered camel tours, all-terrain vehicle rides, helicopter tours and motor glides. Crescent Lake became part of the Dunhuang Yardang National Geopark which was recognized 2015 by UNESCO.
