= Dunhuang railway =

Railway branch line in Gansu Province, China

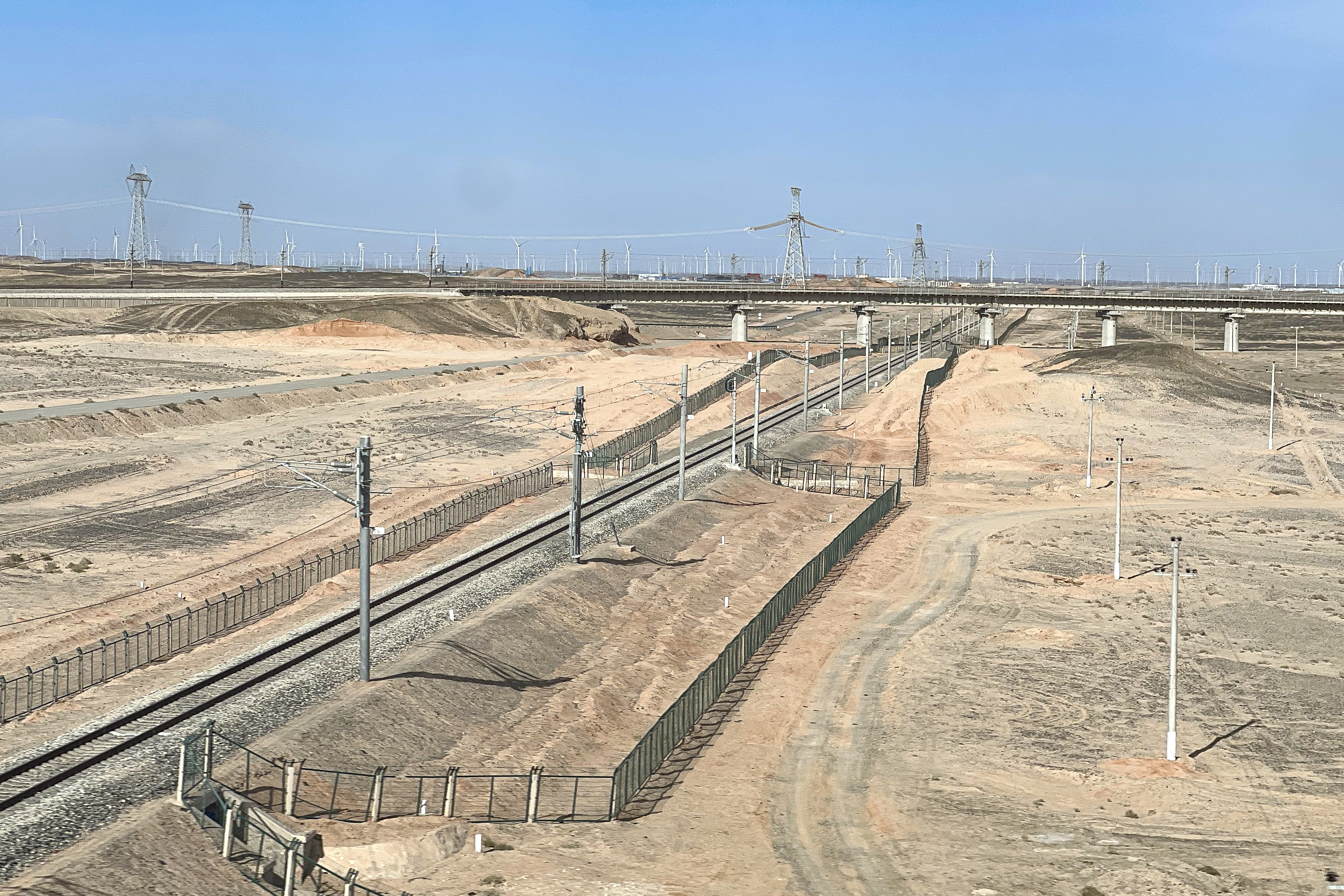
The Dunhuang Railway north of Shuangta railway station in 2023

The Dunhuang railway (simplified Chinese: 敦煌铁路; traditional Chinese: 敦煌鐵路; pinyin: Dūnhuáng Tiělù) is a branch of the Lanzhou–Xinjiang railway in Gansu Province, China. It runs 169 kilometres (105 mi) from Liugou railway station in Guazhou County, on the main line, to the terminus at Dunhuang railway station. Construction, at a cost of 640 million yuan, started on 7 September 2004. The first service to Dunhuang ran on 3 March 2006.

== Station list ==
Station	Chinese	Distance (km)	Location		Coordinates
Liugou	柳沟	0	Guazhou County	Jiuquan, Gansu	40°40′44″N 96°26′16″E
Xiaowan	小宛		Guazhou County	Jiuquan, Gansu	
Guazhou	瓜州		Guazhou County	Jiuquan, Gansu	40°34′04″N 95°46′25″E
Tianshuijing	甜水井		Dunhuang	Jiuquan, Gansu	
Dunhuang	敦煌	169	Dunhuang	Jiuquan, Gansu	40°10′07″N 94°47′00″E

== See also ==
- Golmud–Dunhuang railway
- Mogao Caves
