= Gansu Dunhuang Solar Park =

Photovoltaic power station at Dunhuang, Gansu, China

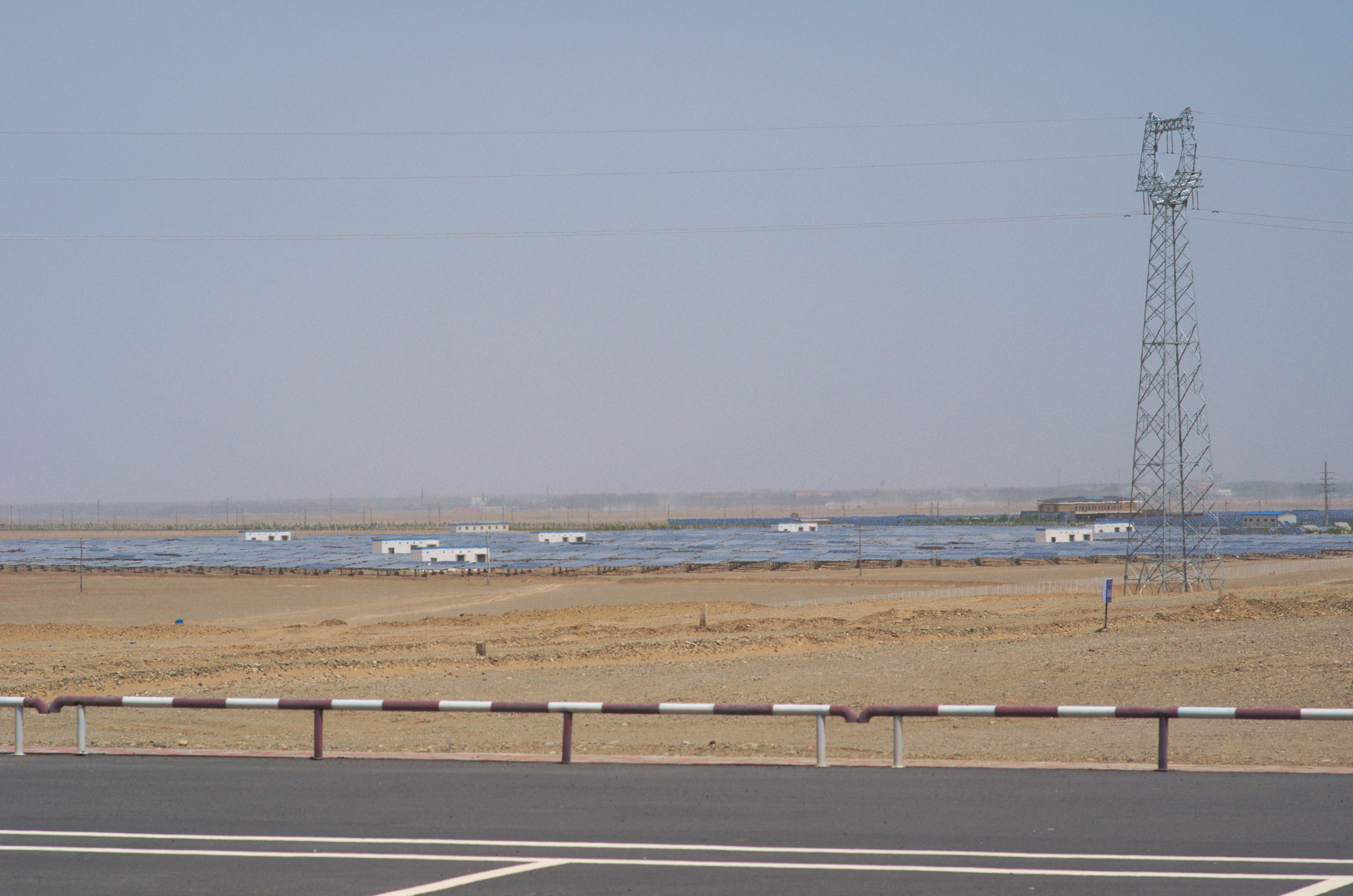
- A part of the station
- Country: China
- Location: Gansu Province
- Coordinates: 40°04′N 94°30′E
- Status: Operational
- Commission date: January 2013

Solar farm
- Type: Flat-panel PV

Power generation
- Nameplate capacity: 50 MW^{p}
- Annual net output: 78.2 GWh

External links
- Commons: Related media on Commons

The Gansu Dunhuang Solar Park is a 50-megawatt (MW) photovoltaic power station located in the Dunhuang, Jiuquan, Gansu Province, in China. All of the modules, which range from 230 to 240 watts, are mounted at a fixed tilt angle of 38°. It is located in the Photoelectricity Park of Dunhuang City. China's first solar power plant, 10 MW, was built here and commissioned on 30 September 2009. An additional 95 MW is expected in 2013, and 5,000 MW by 2020.

== See also ==
- List of photovoltaic power stations
- Photovoltaic power station
- Photovoltaics
