= Singing Sand Dunes (Dunhuang) =

Sand hill in Gansu, China

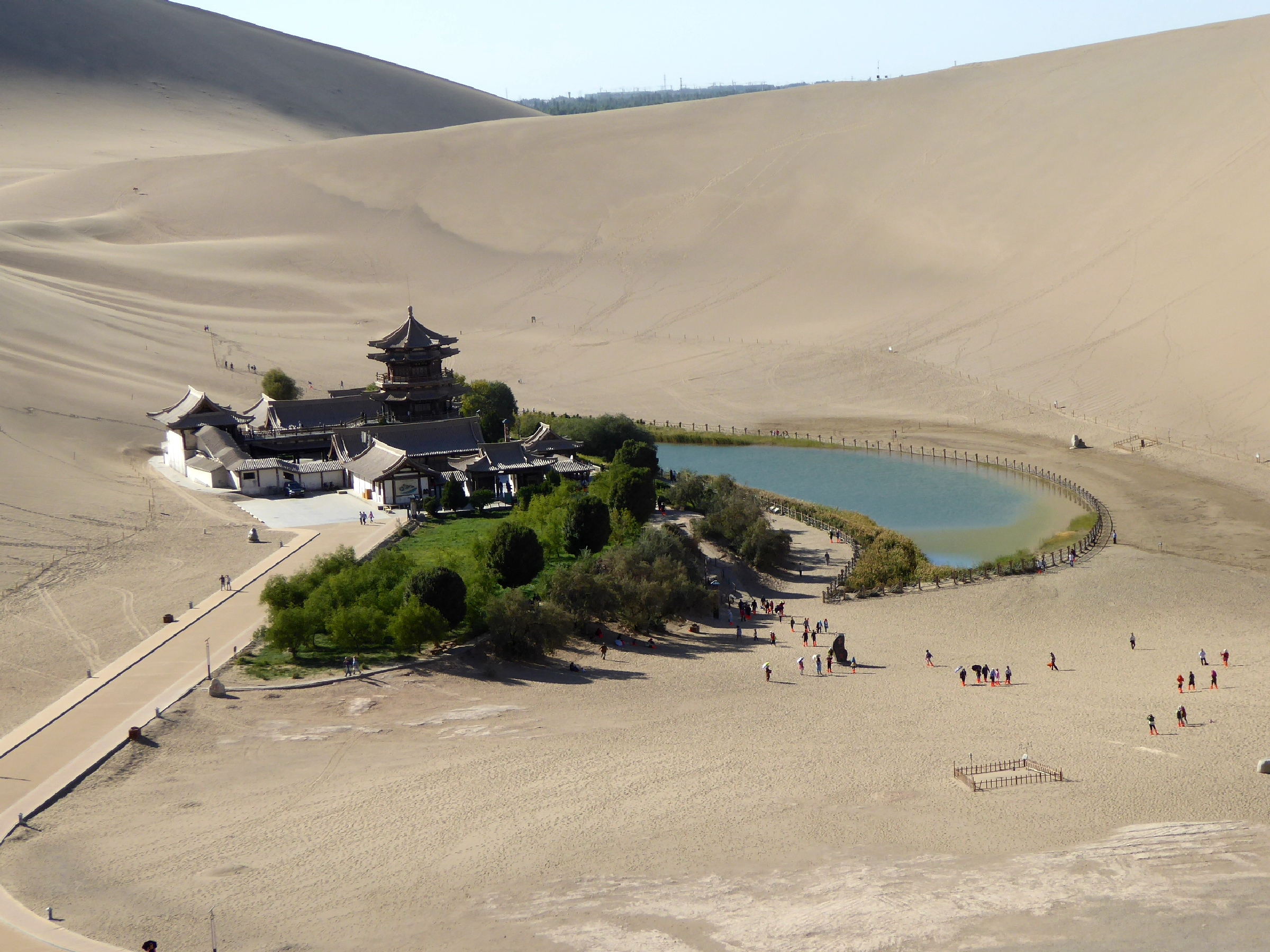
The Singing Sand Dunes on the backside of Crescent Lake

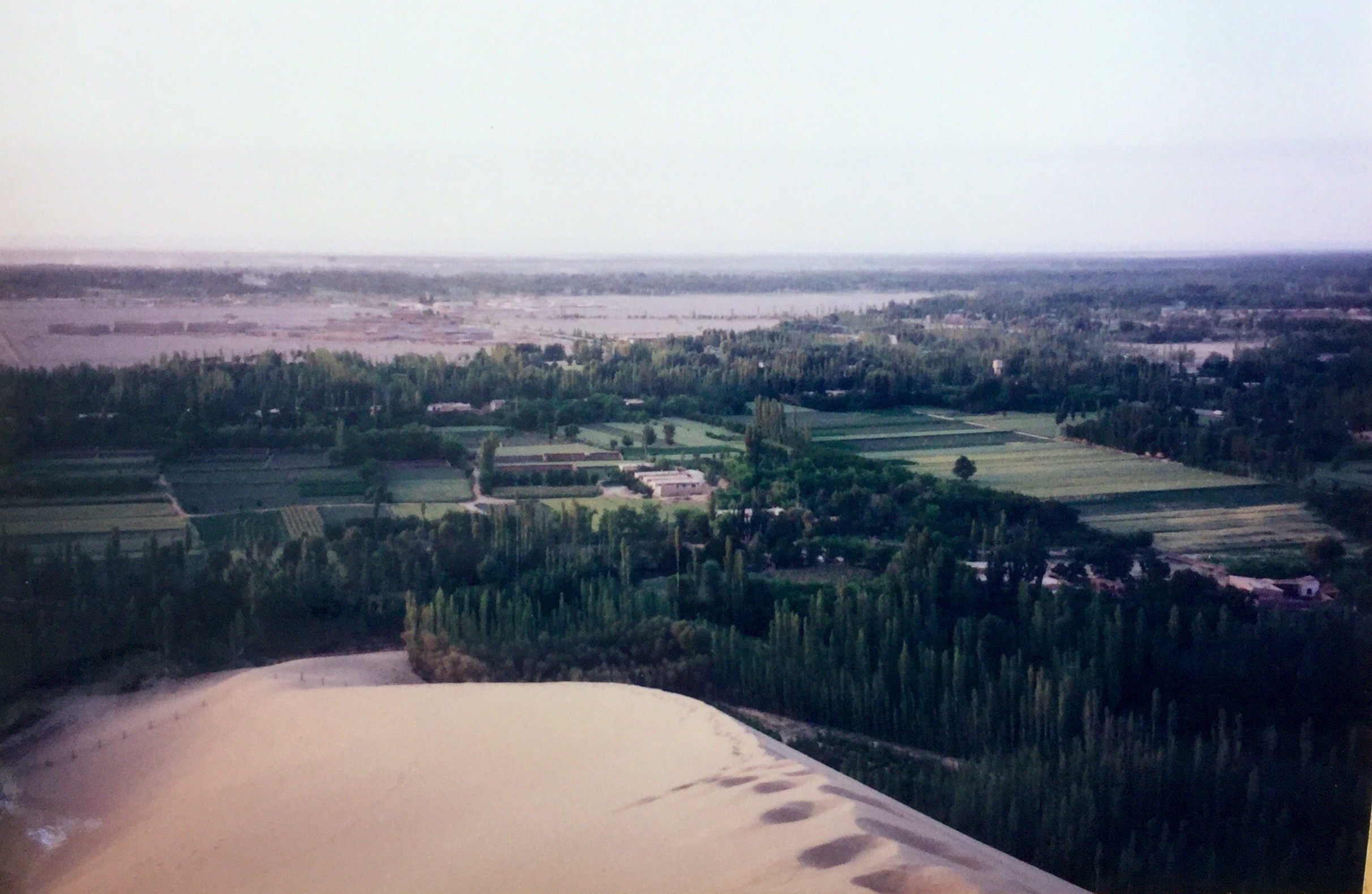
In 1995

The Singing Sand Dunes (Chinese: 鳴沙山 Pinyin: míng shā shān) in Dunhuang, China, are the sand dunes that, when the wind blows, give out a singing or drumming sound. They are part of the Kumtag Desert.

The Singing Sand Dunes were originally known as the "Gods' Sand Dunes" (Chinese: 神沙山). In the Records of the Grand Historian, Sima Qian described the sound "as if listening to music when the weather is fine." During the Ming Dynasty, they came to be called by the current name. The dunes are also where a crescent-shaped lake called Yueyaquan or Crescent Lake is located.

There are four better-known singing sand dunes in China, that include those of Hami, which are usually said to give the best sound among the four, and those of Dunhuang.

The tourist area at the site offers various facilities and activities such as ATV riding, paragliding, camel rides and sandboarding.

== See also ==
- Singing sand
- Mogao Caves: nearby
