= List of long railway tunnels in China =

The Chinese railway tunnels are divided into four classes by length:

1. Super-long tunnels (over 10,000 metres)
2. Long tunnels (between 3,000 and 10,000 metres)
3. Middle tunnels (between 500 and 3,000 metres)
4. Short tunnels (less than 500 metres)

By 2008, there were 6,102 railway tunnels in operation in China. Their total length reached 3,938,913 metres (2,447.53 mi).

This page lists the railway tunnels longer than 10 km (6 mi) in mainland China, except those in metro systems.

Name (Chinese)	Province	Length in km (mi)	Tubes x tracks	Year completed	Line
Yigong Tunnel (易贡隧道)	Tibet	42.362 km (26.3 mi)	2x1	u/c	Sichuan-Tibet railway
Shanghai Airport Tunnel (上海机场隧道)	Shanghai	40.188 km (25.0 mi)	1x2	u/c	Shanghai Airports Connection Rail Line
Songshanhu Tunnel (松山湖隧道)	Guangdong	38.813 km (24.1 mi)	2x1	2016	Dongguan–Huizhou intercity railway
Sejilashan Tunnel (色季拉山隧道)	Tibet	37.965 km (23.6 mi)	2x1	u/c	Sichuan-Tibet railway
Pearl River Tunnel (珠江隧道)	Guangdong	36.043 km (22.4 mi)	2x1	u/c	Guangzhou–Foshan circular intercity railway
Shenzhen Hong Kong Tunnel (深港隧道)	Guangdong	35.655 km (22.2 mi)	2x1	2018	Guangzhou–Shenzhen–Hong Kong Express Rail Link Mainland Section
Gaoligongshan Tunnel (高黎贡山隧道)	Yunnan	34.522 km (21.5 mi)	1x1	u/c	Dali–Ruili railway
Guolashan Tunnel (果拉山隧道)	Tibet	34.348 km (21.3 mi)	2x1	u/c	Sichuan-Tibet railway
Deda Tunnel (德达隧道)	Sichuan	33.350 km (20.7 mi)	2x1	u/c	Sichuan-Tibet railway
Haizishan Tunnel (海子山隧道)	Sichuan	33.020 km (20.5 mi)	2x1	u/c	Sichuan-Tibet railway
New Guanjiao Tunnel (新关角隧道)	Qinghai	32.645 km (20.3 mi)	2x1	2014	Qinghai–Tibet Railway
Layue Tunnel (拉月隧道)	Tibet	31.675 km (19.7 mi)	2x1	u/c	Sichuan-Tibet railway
Mangkangshan Tunnel (芒康山隧道)	Tibet	30.675 km (19.1 mi)	2x1	u/c	Sichuan-Tibet railway
Zilashan Tunnel (孜拉山隧道)	Tibet	30.010 km (18.6 mi)	2x1	u/c	Sichuan-Tibet railway
Shenwan Tunnel (深莞隧道)	Guangdong	29.944 km (18.6 mi)	2x1	u/c	Shenzhen-Zhanjiang high-speed railway
Boshulaling Tunnel (伯舒拉岭隧道)	Tibet	29.068 km (18.1 mi)	2x1	u/c	Sichuan-Tibet railway
Milashan Tunnel (米拉山隧道)	Sichuan	29.030 km (18.0 mi)	2x1	u/c	Sichuan-Tibet railway
Yelashan Tunnel (业拉山隧道)	Tibet	28.639 km (17.795 mi)	2x1	u/c	Sichuan-Tibet railway
Ping'an Tunnel (平安隧道)	Sichuan	28.398 km (17.6 mi) & 28.236 km (17.5 mi)	2x1	2023	Chengdu–Lanzhou Railway
West Qinling Tunnel (西秦岭隧道)	Gansu	28.237 km (17.5 mi) & 28.236 km (17.5 mi)	2x1	2016	Chongqing–Lanzhou Railway
Pingshandong Tunnel (坪山东隧道)	Guangdong	27.885 km (17.327 mi)	1x2	u/c	Shenzhen-Shanwei HSR
Taihang Tunnel (太行山隧道)	Shanxi	27.848 km (17.304 mi) & 27.839 km (17.298 mi)	2x1	2007	Shijiazhuang–Taiyuan High-Speed Railway
Baolingshan Tunnel (宝灵山隧道)	Sichuan	26.547 km (16.5 mi)	2x1	u/c	Sichuan-Tibet railway
Gongjue Tunnel (贡觉隧道)	Tibet	26.175 km (16.3 mi)	2x1	u/c	Sichuan-Tibet railway
Minshan Tunnel (岷山隧道)	Sichuan	25.047 km (15.6 mi)	2x1	u/c	Chengdu–Lanzhou railway
Yiliang Tunnel (彝良隧道)	Yunnan	24.832 km (15.4 mi)	1x2	u/c	Chongqing–Kunming high-speed railway
Duoji Tunnel (多吉隧道)	Tibet	24.188 km (15.0 mi)	2x1	u/c	Sichuan-Tibet railway
Kazilashan Tunnel (卡子拉山隧道)	Sichuan	23.980 km (14.9 mi)	2x1	u/c	Sichuan-Tibet railway
South Lüliangshan Tunnel (南吕梁山隧道)	Shanxi	23.470 km (14.6 mi) & 23.440 km (14.6 mi)	2x1	2014	Shanxi–Henan–Shandong Railway
Bangda Tunnel (邦达隧道)	Tibet	22.985 km (14.3 mi)	1x2	u/c	Sichuan-Tibet railway
Desheng Tunnel (德胜隧道)	Sichuan	22.943 km (14.3 mi)	1x2	2024	Chengdu–Lanzhou Railway
Qinling Mabaishan Tunnel (秦岭马白山隧道)	Shaanxi	22.922 km (14.2 mi)	1x2	u/c	Xi'an-Shiyan High Speed Railway
Xiaoshan Tunnel (崤山隧道)	Henan	22.771 km (14.1 mi) & 22.751 km (14.1 mi)	2x1	2019	Haoji Railway
Middle Tianshan Tunnel (中天山隧道)	Xinjiang	22.467 km (14.0 mi) & 22.449 km (13.9 mi)	2x1	2014	Turpan-Korla 2nd Line Railway
Ganqing Tunnel (甘青隧道)	Gansu, Qinghai	22.38 km (13.9 mi)	1x2	u/c	Chengdu–Lanzhou Railway
Qianhuang Tunnel (前皇隧道)	Guangdong	22.218 km (13.8 mi)	2x1->1x2	u/c	Guangzhou-Shenzhen Intercity Railway
Qingyunshan Tunnel (青云山隧道)	Fujian	22.175 km (13.8 mi) & 21.843 km (13.6 mi)	2x1	2012	Xiangtang–Putian Railway
Xigu Tunnel (西固隧道)	Gansu	22.055 km (13.7 mi)	2x1	u/c	Lanzhou-Hezuo Railway
Xiaoxiangling Tunnel (小相岭隧道)	Sichuan	21.775 km (13.5 mi) & 21.843 km (13.6 mi)	1x2	2022	Chengdu-Kunming Railway
Haidong Nanshan Tunnel (海东南山隧道)	Qinghai	21.605 km (13.4 mi) & 21.595 km (13.4 mi)	2x1	u/c	Xining-Chengdu Railway
Kangyu Tunnel (康玉隧道)	Tibet	21.340 km (13.3 mi)	2x1	u/c	Sichuan-Tibet railway
Zhazong Tunnel (扎宗隧道)	Tibet	21.235 km (13.2 mi)	1x2	u/c	Sichuan-Tibet railway
Binghui Tunnel (炳辉隧道)	Yunnan	21.170 km (13.2 mi)	1x2	u/c	Chongqing–Kunming high-speed railway
Yanshan Tunnel (燕山隧道)	Hebei	21.178 km (13.2 mi) & 21.154 km (13.144 mi)	1x2	2014	Xiangtang–Putian Railway
Kangding No2 Tunnel (康定二号隧道)	Sichuan	20.793 km (12.9 mi)	1x2	u/c	Sichuan-Tibet railway
Lüliangshan Tunnel (吕梁山隧道)	Shanxi	20.785 km (12.915 mi) & 20.734 km (12.884 mi)	2x1	2010	Taiyuan-Zhongwei-Yinchuan Railway
Honglashan Tunnel (红拉山隧道)	Tibet	20.220 km (12.6 mi)	1x2	u/c	Sichuan-Tibet railway
Dangjinshan Tunnel (当金山隧道)	Gansu	20.125 km (12.505 mi)	1x1	2019	Golmud–Dunhuang Railway
Wushaoling Tunnel (乌鞘岭隧道)	Gansu	20.060 km (12.465 mi) & 20.050 km (12.458 mi)	2x1	2006	Lanzhou–Xinjiang Railway
Yuelongmeng Tunnel (跃龙门隧道)	Sichuan	20.042 km (12.454 mi) & 19.981 km (12.416 mi)	2x1	2023	Lanzhou-Chongqing Railway
Anhua Tunnel (安化隧道)	Gansu	19.980 km (12.4 mi)	1x1	u/c	Tianshui-Longnan Railway
New Majishan Tunnel (新麦积山隧道)	Gansu	19.818 km (12.3 mi)	1x1	u/c	Tianshui-Longnan Railway
Tanglangshan Tunnel (塘朗山隧道)	Guangdong	19.17 km (11.91 mi)	1x2	u/c	Shenzhen-Shanwei HSR
Muzhailing Tunnel (木寨岭隧道)	Gansu	19.068 km (11.848 mi) & 19.050 km (11.837 mi)	2x1	2014	Chongqing–Lanzhou Railway
Xiaosanxia Tunnel (小三峡隧道)	Chongqing	18.954 km (11.777 mi)	1x2	2022	Zhengzhou-Wanzhou Railway
Xiamen Bay Under-sea Tunnel (厦门湾跨海隧道)	Fujian	18.950 km (11.775 mi)	1x2	u/c	Xiamen-Zhangzhou Intercity Railway
Qingling Taixing Tunnel (秦岭太兴山隧道)	Shaanxi	18.840 km (11.707 mi)	2x1	u/c	Xi'an-Ankang HSR
Gaoersishan Tunnel (高尔寺山隧道)	Sichuan	18.840 km (11.707 mi)	1x2	u/c	Sichuan-Tibet railway
Xinhua Tunnel (新华隧道)	Hubei	18.770 km (11.663 mi)	1x2	2022	Zhengzhou-Wanzhou Railway
Qinling Tunnel (秦岭隧道)	Shaanxi	18.460 km (11.5 mi) & 18.456 km (11.5 mi)	2x1	2002	Xi'an–Ankang Railway
Zhongtiaoshan Tunnel (中条山隧道)	Shanxi	18.410 km (11.4 mi) & 18.405 km (11.4 mi)	2x1	2019	Haoji Railway
Langlashan Tunnel (浪拉山隧道)	Tibet	18.840 km (11.707 mi)	2x1	u/c	Sichuan-Tibet railway
Longgang Tunnel (龙岗隧道)	Guangdong	18.323 km (11.385 mi)	1x2	u/c	Shenzhen-Shanwei HSR
Dongming Tunnel (东茗隧道)	Zhejiang	18.226 km (11.3 mi)	1x2	2022	Hongzhou-Shaoxing-Taizhou Intercity Railway
Shilin Tunnel (石林隧道)	Yunnan	18.208 km (11.3 mi)	1x2	2015	Nanning-Kunming HSR
Geinieshan Tunnel (格聂山隧道)	Sichuan	18.175 km (11.293 mi)	2x1	u/c	Sichuan-Tibet railway
Yingjinshan No1 Tunnel (迎金山一号隧道)	Sichuan	18.141 km (11.272 mi)	1x2	u/c	Sichuan-Tibet railway
South Taihangshan Tunnel (南太行山隧道)	Shanxi-Henan	18.125 km (11.3 mi) & 18.108 km (11.3 mi)	2x1	2014	Watang-Rizhao Railway
Xiling Tunnel (西岭隧道)	Shaanxi	18.090 km (11.2 mi)	2x1	u/c	Xi'an–Shiyan HSR
Xi'anling Tunnel (西安岭隧道)	Henan	18.063 km (11.2 mi) & 18.069 km (11.2 mi)	2x1	2019	Haoji Railway
Yinpanshan Tunnel (营盘山隧道)	Yunnan-Sichuan	17.934 km (11.1 mi)	2x1	2019	Chengdu–Kunming Railway
Xuefengshan Tunnel (雪峰山隧道)	Fujian	17.842 km (11.1 mi) & 17.826 km (11.1 mi)	2x1	2012	Nanchang–Fuzhou Railway
Changdu Tunnel (昌都隧道)	Tibet	17.801 km (11.061 mi)	1x2	u/c	Sichuan-Tibet railway
Xiangshan Tunnel (香山隧道)	Ningxia	17.765 km (11.0 mi)	1x2	u/c	Zhongwei-Lanzhou HSR
Moxi Tunnel (莫西隧道)	Sichuan	17.763 km (11.037 mi)	2x1	u/c	Sichuan-Tibet railway
Xiuling Tunnel (秀岭隧道)	Yunnan	17.623 km (11.0 mi)	2x1	2022	Dali–Ruili Railway
Gaoganshan Tunnel (高盖山隧道)	Fujian	17,612 km (10,943.6 mi) & 17,594 km (10,932.4 mi)	2x1	2012	Nanchang–Fuzhou Railway
Jixin Tunnel (吉新隧道)	Sichuan	17.607 km (10.940 mi)	1x2	2022	Chengdu–Kunming Railway Double Track
Jiufengshan#2 Tunnel (鹫峰山二号隧道)	Fujian	17.596 km (10.9 mi)	2x1	2020	Quzhou-Ningde Railway
Yijun Tunnel (宜君隧道)	Shaanxi	17.509 km (10.9 mi)	1x2	2025	Xi'an-Yan'an HSR
Anding Tunnel (安定隧道)	Yunnan	17.476 km (10.9 mi)	1x2	2021	Yuxi-Mohan Railway
Wanhe Tunnel (万和隧道)	Yunnan	17.441 km (10.8 mi)	1x2	2021	Yuxi-Mohan Railway
Dagala Tunnel (达嘎拉隧道)	Tibet	17.324 km (10.8 mi)	1x1	2021	Lasa-Linzhi Railway
Kangding Tunnel (康定隧道)	Sichuan	17.300 km (10.750 mi)	2x1	u/c	Sichuan-Tibet railway
Shangli Tunnel (上里隧道)	Guangxi	17.271 km (10.732 mi)	1x1	u/c	Huangtong-Baise railway
Pazhou Tunnel (琶洲隧道)	Guangdong	17.204 km (10.7 mi) & 17.017 km (10.6 mi)	2x1	u/c	Guangzhou-Dongguan-Shenzhen Intercity Railway Pazhou Branch
Pingbu Tunnel (平步隧道)	Guangdong	17.185 km (10.7 mi)	1x2	2020	Guangzhou–Shenzhen intercity railway
Yongshouliang Tunnel (永寿梁隧道)	Shaanxi	17.161 km (10.7 mi) & 17,155 km (10,659.6 mi)	2x1	2012	Xi'an-Pingliang Railway
New Wushaoling Tunnel (新乌鞘岭隧道)	Gansu	17.125 km (10.6 mi)	1x2	u/c	Lanzhou-Zhangye High Speed Railway
Huangyan Tunnel (黄岩隧道)	Hunan	17.030 km (10.6 mi)	1x2	2018	Huaihua-Shaoyang Railway
Jiuwandashan #1 Tunnel (九万大山一号隧道)	Guizhou	17.012 km (10.6 mi)	1x2	2023	Guiyang–Nanning high-speed railway
Xingdongshan Tunnel (兴山东隧道)	Hubei	16.883 km (10.5 mi)	1x2	u/c	Zhengzhou-Wanzhou HSR Yixing Connection Line
Baoyun Tunnel (宝云隧道)	Yunnan	16.797 km (10.4 mi)	1x2	u/c	Chongqing Kunming HSR
Liupanshan Tunnel (六盘山隧道)	Gansu	16.719 km (10.4 mi)	1x1 (Note: 2 tracks in first 574m)	2015	Tianshui-Pingliang Railway
Jiufengshan#1 Tunnel (鹫峰山一号隧道)	Fujian	16.626 km (10.3 mi)	2x1	2020	Quzhou-Ningde Railway
Hadapu Tunnel (哈达铺隧道)	Gansu	16.600 km (10.3 mi) & 16.590 km (10.3 mi)	2x1	2014	Chongqing–Lanzhou Railway
Xiangjiang Tunnel (湘江隧道)	Hunan	16.600 km (10.3 mi)	1x2	2017	Changsha–Zhuzhou–Xiangtan intercity railway
Wushan Tunnel (巫山隧道)	Chongqing	16.571 km (10.3 mi)	1x2	2022	Zhengzhou-Wanzhou Railway
Qujin Tunnel (曲靖隧道)	Yunnan	16.460 km (10.2 mi)	1x2	u/c	Chongqing–Kunming high-speed railway
Sangzhouling Tunnel (桑珠岭隧道)	Tibet	16.449 km (10.2 mi)	1x1	2021	Lasa-Linzhi Railway
Liutongzhai Tunnel (榴桐寨隧道)	Sichuan	16.312 km (10.1 mi)	2x1	2023	Chengdu–Lanzhou Railway
Fuxian Tunnel (富县隧道)	Shaanxi	16.293 km (10.1 mi)	1x2	2025	Xi'an-Yan'an HSR
Xujiaping Tunnel (徐家坪隧道)	Gansu	16.270 km (10.110 mi)	1x1	u/c	Tianshui-Longnan Railway
Zhaotong Tunnel (昭通隧道)	Yunnan	16.260 km (10.1 mi)	1x2	u/c	Chongqing–Kunming high-speed railway
Taiyueshan Tunnel (太岳山隧道)	Shanxi	16.194 km (10.1 mi)	1x2	2014	Watang-Rizhao Railway
Jintang Tunnel (金塘隧道)	Zhejiang	16.180 km (10.1 mi)	1x2	u/c	Zhoushan-Ningbo Railway
Baoshan Tunnel (保山隧道)	Yunnan	16.097 km (10.0 mi)	1x1	2023	Dali-Ruili Railway
Dongdashan Tunnel (东达山隧道)	Tibet	16.045 km (9.970 mi)	1x2	u/c	Sichuan-Tibet railway
New Yan'an Tunnel (新延安隧道)	Shaanxi	16.000 km (9.9 mi)	1x2	2025	Xi'an-Yan'an HSR
Tianhuashan Tunnel (天华山隧道)	Shaanxi	15.989 km (9.9 mi)	1x2	2017	Xi'an-Chengdu High Speed Railway
Dabanshan Tunnel (大坂山隧道)	Qinghai	15.918 km (9.9 mi)	1x2	2014	Lanzhou–Ürümqi High-Speed Railway
Xiangshan Tunnel (象山隧道)	Fujian	15.917 km (9.890 mi) & 15.898 km (9.879 mi)	2x1	2011	Longyan–Xiamen Railway
Erqingshan Tunnel (二青山隧道)	Shanxi	15.851 km (9.8 mi)	1x1	2014	Taiyuan-Xingxian Railway
Xinhua Tunnel (新华隧道)	Yunnan	15.845 km (9.846 mi)	1x2	2021	Yuxi-Mohan Railway
Heishan Tunnel (黑山隧道)	Gansu	15.764 km (9.795 mi)	1x2	2017	Chongqing–Lanzhou Railway
Guanshan Tunnel (关山隧道)	Gansu	15.634 km (9.715 mi)	1x1	2015	Tianshui–Pingliang Railway
Daiyunshan Tunnel (戴云山隧道)	Fujian	15.623 km (9.7 mi) & 15.605 km (9.696 mi)	2x1 (Note: 1x2 in first 695m)	2012	Nanchang-Fuzhou Railway
Suzhou East Tunnel (苏州东隧道)	Jiangsu	15.565 km (9.672 mi)	1x2	u/c	Nantong-Ningbo high-speed railway
Ludian Tunnel (鲁甸隧道)	Yunnan	15.504 km (9.6 mi)	1x2	u/c	Chongqing–Kunming high-speed railway
Jiuwandashan #4 Tunnel (九万大山四号隧道)	Guangxi	15.485 km (9.6 mi)	1x2	2023	Guiyang–Nanning high-speed railway
Shenwan Tunnel (深莞隧道)	Guangdong	15.469 km (9.612 mi)	1x2	u/c	Shenzhen-Zhanjiang High-Speed Railway
Ludian Tunnel ( 鲁甸隧道	Yunnan	15.464 km (9.6 mi)	1x2	u/c	Chongqing-Kunming High Speed Railway
Jiyi Tunnel (集义隧道)	Shaanxi	15.417 km (9.6 mi)	1x2	2019	Haoji Railway
Jifengshan Tunnel (鸡峰山隧道)	Gansu	15.385 km (9.560 mi)	1x1	u/c	Tianshui-Longnan Railway
Jiulingshan Tunnel (九岭山隧道)	Jiangxi	15.365 km (9.5 mi)	1x2	2019	Haoji Railway
Changlong Tunnel (长隆隧道)	Guangdong	15.259 km (9.5 mi)	2x1	2022	Foshan-Dongguan Intercity Railway
Ganzhuang Tunnel (甘庄隧道)	Yunnan	15.245 km (9.473 mi)	1x2	2021	Yuxi-Mohan Railway
Fengshuling Tunnel (枫树岭隧道)	Zhejiang	15.185 km (9.436 mi)	1x2	u/c	Quzhou-Lishui Railway
Liulangshan Tunnel (六狼山隧道)	Shanxi	15.175 km (9.4 mi)	1x1	2014	Zhungeer-Shuozhou Railway
Huangzhuguan Tunnel (黄渚关隧道)	Gansu	15.164 km (9.422 mi)	1x1	u/c	Tianshui-Longnan Railway
Laoanshan Tunnel (老安山隧道)	Shaanxi	15.161 km (9.4 mi)	1x2	2017	Xi'an-Chengdu High Speed Railway
Guifengshan Tunnel (圭峰山隧道)	Guangdong	15.155 km (9.4 mi)	1x2	u/c	Zhuhai-Zhaoqing High-Speed Railway
Xiangluping Tunnel (香炉坪隧道)	Hubei	15.154 km (9.4 mi)	1x2	2022	Zhengzhou-Wanzhou Railway
Du'an Tunnel (都安隧道)	Guangxi	15.152 km (9.415 mi)	1x2	2023	Guiyang–Nanning high-speed railway
Liulin Tunnel (柳林隧道)	Gansu	15.152 km (9.415 mi)	1x1	u/c	Tianshui-Longnan Railway
Chicheng Tunnel (赤城隧道)	Hebei	15.047 km (9.3 mi)	1x2	2014	Zhangjiakou-Tangshan Railway
Pingluo Tunnel (平洛隧道)	Gansu	15.032 km (9.340 mi)	1x1	u/c	Tianshui-Longnan Railway
Daxing'anling Tunnel (大兴安岭隧道)	Inner Mongolia	14.970 km (9.302 mi)	1x2	u/c	Harbin-Manzhouli Railway
Qunke Tunnel (群科隧道)	Qinghai	14.955 km (9.293 mi)	1x2	u/c	Chengdu-Xining Railway
Zhujiashan Tunnel (朱家山隧道)	Gansu	14.949 km (9.3 mi)	1x2	2017	Baoji-Lanzhou High-speed Railway
Maotianshan Tunnel (冒天山隧道)	Shaanxi	14.915 km (9.3 mi)	1x1	2010	Baotou–Xi'an 2nd Railway
Duomuge Tunnel (多木格隧道)	Tibet	14.884 km (9.248 mi)	1x2	u/c	Sichuan-Tibet railway
Daqingling Tunnel (大秦岭隧道)	Shaanxi	14.846 km (9.2 mi)	1x2	2017	Xi'an-Chengdu High-speed Railway
Xinping Tunnel (新平隧道)	Yunnan	14.835 km (9.218 mi)	1x2	2021	Yuxi-Mohan Railway
Tianzhushan No1 Tunnel (天竺山一号隧道)	Shaanxi	14.792 km (9.191 mi)	1x2	u/c	Xi'an-Shiyan High-speed Railway
Tiefengshan Tunnel (铁峰山隧道)	Chongqing	14.783 km (9.186 mi)	1x2	u/c	Chongqing-Xi'an HSR
Hengshan Tunnel (恒山隧道)	Shanxi	14.76 km (9.2 mi)	1x2	u/c	Datong-Xi'an High-speed Railway
Bibanpo Tunnel (壁板坡隧道)	Yunnan	14.756 km (9.2 mi)	2x1	2015	Shanghai-Kunming High-Speed Railway
Bijiashan Tunnel (笔架山隧道)	Gansu	14.751 km (9.2 mi)	1x2	2017	Baiji–Lanzhou High Speed Railway
Yulong Snow Mountain Tunnel (玉龙雪山隧道)	Yunnan	14.745 km (9.2 mi)	1x2	2023	Lijiang-Shangri-la Railway
Erlangshan Tunnel (二郎山隧道)	Sichuan	14.732 km (9.154 mi)	1x2	u/c	Sichuan-Tibet railway
Dabieshan Tunnel (大别山隧道)	Anhui - Hubei	14.698 km (9.133 mi)	1x2	u/c	Shanghai-Chongqing-Chengdu High Speed Railway
Yanshan Tunnel (岩山隧道)	Guizhou	14.695 km (9.1 mi)	1x2	2014	Guiyang–Guangzhou High-Speed Railway
Qianshiyan Tunnel (千石岩隧道)	Zhejiang	14.684 km (9.1 mi)	1x2	2023	Ningbo-Jinhua Railway
Dapoling Tunnel (大坡岭隧道)	Yunnan	14.665 km (9.1 mi)	1x1	2022	Dali-Ruili Railway
Wuyishan Tunnel (武夷山隧道)	Fujian-Jiangxi	14.659 km (9.1 mi)	1x2	2012	Xiangtang–Putian Railway
Kaole Tunnel (考勒隧道)	Gansu	14.659 km (9.1 mi)	1x2	u/c	Lanzhou-Hezuo Railway
North Wuyishan Tunnel (北武夷山隧道)	Fujian-Jiangxi	14.646 km (9.1 mi)	1x2	2015	Hefei-Fuzhou High Speed Railway
Tongbaiyuan No1 Tunnel (桐柏塬一号隧道)	Shaanxi	14.616 km (9.1 mi)	1x2	u/c	Yan'an-Yulin-Ordos High Speed Railway
Sandu Tunnel (三都隧道)	Guizhou	14.598 km (9.071 mi)	1x2	2014	Guiyang–Guangzhou high-speed railway
Changleshan Tunnel (常乐山隧道)	Zhejiang	14.597 km (9.070 mi)	1x1	2020	Quzhou-Ningde Railway
Hongshiyan Tunnel (红石岩隧道)	Yunnan	14.580 km (9.060 mi)	1x2	2015	Yunnan-Guangxi Railway
Baokang Tunnel (保康隧道)	Hubei	14.574 km (9.056 mi)	1x2	2022	Zhengzhou-Wanzhou HSR
Fajiushan Tunnel (发鸠山隧道)	Shanxi	14.573 km (9.055 mi)	1x2	2014	Watang-Rizhao Railway
Duoji Tunnel (多吉隧道)	Yunnan	14.539 km (9.034 mi)	1x2	2021	Yuxi-Mohan Railway
Dazhongshan (大中山隧道)	Henan	14.533 km (9.030 mi)	1x2	2019	Haoji Railway
Linjiashan Tunnel (林家山隧道)	Shaanxi	14.530 km (9.029 mi)	1x2	u/c	Xi'an-Ankang Railway
Tianchiping Tunnel (天池坪隧道)	Gansu	14.528 km (9.027 mi)	1x2	2014	Chongqing–Lanzhou Railway
Yujialiang Tunnel (余家梁隧道)	Shaanxi	14.504 km (9.012 mi)	1x2	u/c	Chongqing-Xi'an High Speed Railway
Taiping Tunnel (太平隧道)	Guangdong	14.490 km (9.004 mi)	2x1	2018	Guangzhou-Dongguan-Shenzhen Intercity Railway
Dazhushan Tunnel (大柱山隧道)	Yunnan	14.484 km (9.000 mi)	1x1	2022	Dali-Ruili Railway
Nanjing South Station Tunnel (南京南站隧道)	Jiangsu	14.442 km (8.974 mi)	1x1	u/c	Nanjing-Wuhu Railway
Fengshun Tunnel (丰顺隧道)	Guangdong	14.407 km (8.952 mi)	1x2	2019	Guangzhou–Meizhou–Shantou high-speed railway
Dechang Tunnel (德昌隧道)	Sichuan	14.365 km (8.926 mi)	1x2	2021	Chengdu-Kunming Railway
Dayaoshan Tunnel (大瑶山隧道)	Guangdong	14.295 km (8.883 mi)	1x2	1987	Beijing–Guangzhou railway
Binxian Tunnel (彬县隧道)	Shaanxi	14.251 km (8.855 mi)	1x2	2020	Xi'an-Yinchuan Railway
Chongming-Taicang Yangtse River Tunnel (崇太长江隧道)	Jiangsu-Shanghai	14.250 km (8.855 mi)	1x2	u/c	Shanghai–Nanjing–Hefei high-speed railway
Xierluo Tunnel (西俄洛隧道)	Sichuan	14.240 km (8.848 mi)	1x2	u/c	Sichuan-Tibet railway
Dajianshan Tunnel (大尖山隧道)	Yunnan	14.207 km (8.828 mi)	1x2	2021	Yuxi-Mohan Railway
East Dabashan Tunnel (东大巴山隧道)	Shaanxi - Chongqing	14.172 km (8.806 mi)	1x2	u/c	Chongqing-Xi'an High Speed Railway
Deli Tunnel (得利隧道)	Shaanxi	14.167 km (8.803 mi)	1x2	2017	Xi'an–Chengdu High-Speed Railway
Aobaoliang Tunnel (敖包梁隧道)	Neimenggu	14.123 km (8.776 mi)	1x2	2017	Hohhot-Zhungeer-Erdos Railway
Jinggangshan Tunnel (井冈山隧道)	Jiangxi	14.110 km (8.768 mi)	1x2	u/c	Chongqing-Xiamen High Speed Railway
Jinguashan Tunnel (金瓜山隧道)	Fujian	14.097 km (8.759 mi)	1x2	2013	Nanchang-Fuzhou Railway
Liulang Tunnel (六郎隧道)	Yunnan	14.096 km (8.759 mi)	1x2	2015	Yunnan-Guangxi Railway
Wutaishan Tunnel (五台山隧道)	Shanxi	14.086 km (8.753 mi)	1x2	u/c	Xiong'an-Xinzhou High speed railway
Yanmengguan Tunnel (雁门关隧道)	Shanxi	14.085 km (8.752 mi)	1x2	2013	Datong–Puzhou Railway
Yuezhishan Tunnel (月直山隧道)	Sichuan	14.085 km (8.752 mi)	1x2	2022	Chengdu-Kunming Railway
Linbaoshan Tunnel (林保山隧道)	Yunnan	14.076 km (8.7 mi)	1x1	2020	Dali-Lincang Railway
Shiziyuan Tunnel (柿子园隧道)	Sichuan	14.069 km (8.7 mi)	1x2->2x1	2023	Chengdu-Lanzhou Railway
Lulang Tunnel (鲁朗隧道)	Tibet	14.052 km (8.732 mi)	1x2	u/c	Sichuan-Tibet railway
Tianpingshan Tunnel (天平山隧道)	Guangxi	14.012 km (8.707 mi)	1x2	2014	Guiyang–Guangzhou High-Speed Railway
Shangyuanmen Tunnel (上元门隧道)	Jiangsu	13.970 km (8.681 mi)	1x2	2029	Nanjing-Huai'an high speed railway
Tianping Tunnel (天坪隧道)	Guizhou	13.978 km (8.686 mi)	1x2	2017	Guiyang–Chongqing Railway
Maijishan Tunnel (麦积山隧道)	Gansu	13.947 km (8.7 mi)	1x2	2017	Baoji–Lanzhou High Speed Railway
Qingyang Tunnel (庆阳隧道)	Gansu	13.936 km (8.7 mi)	1x2	2020	Xi'an-Yinchuan Railway
Tongmashan Tunnel (同马山隧道)	Guizhou	13.929 km (8.7 mi)	1x2	2014	Guiyang–Guangzhou High-Speed Railway
Wan'an Tunnel (万安隧道)	Jiangxi	13.928 km (8.7 mi)	1x2	2019	Nanchang-Ganzhou High-Speed Railway
Niyu Tunnel (尼余隧道)	Tibet	13.895 km (8.634 mi)	1x2	u/c	Sichuan-Tibet railway
Anming Tunnel (安民隧道)	Zhejiang	13.856 km (8.6 mi)	1x2	2020	Quzhou-Ningde Railway
Yesanguan Tunnel (野三关隧道)	Hubei	13.838 km (8.6 mi) & 13.7961 km (8.5725 mi)	2x1	2010	Yichang–Wanzhou Railway
Pupeng #1 Tunnel (普棚一号隧道)	Yunnan	13.795 km (8.6 mi)	1x2	2017	Guangtong–Dali Railway
Meihuashan Tunnel (梅花山隧道)	Fujian	13.778 km (8.6 mi)	1x2	2014	Ganzhou–Longyan Railway
Changgangling Tunnel (长岗岭隧道)	Hubei	13.751 km (8.5 mi)	1x2	u/c	Zhengzhou-Wanzhou HSR Yixing Connection Line
Zhujiangkou Tunnel (珠江口隧道)	Guangdong	13.740 km (8.538 mi)	1x2	u/c	Shenzhen-Zhanjiang High-Speed Railway
Daiyunshan 1# Tunnel (戴云山一号隧道)	Fujian	13.720 km (8.5 mi)	1x1	2022	Xingguo-Quanzhou Railway
Baofengshan Tunnel (宝峰山隧道)	Guangxi	13.708 km (8.5 mi)	1x2	2014	Guiyang–Guangzhou High-Speed Railway
QIxinping Tunnel (七星坪隧道)	Sichuan	13.669 km (8.494 mi)	1x2	u/c	Chongqing-Xi'an High Speed Railway
Funing Tunnel (富宁隧道)	Fujian	13.625 km (8.5 mi)	1x2	2016	Nanning–Kunming Railway
Humaling Tunnel (胡麻岭隧道)	Gansu	13.611 km (8.5 mi)	1x2	2017	Chongqing–Lanzhou High-Speed Railway
North Tianshan Tunnel (北天山隧道)	Xinjiang	13.610 km (8.5 mi)	1x1	2009	Jinghe–Yining–Khorgos Railway
Taikang Tunnel (太康隧道)	Shaanxi	13.595 km (8.448 mi)	1x2	2025	Xi'an-Yan'an PDL
Gongduding Tunnel (贡多顶隧道)	Tibet	13.590 km (8.4 mi)	1x1	2021	Lasa-Linzhi Railway
Laobishan Tunnel (老鼻山隧道)	Sichuan	13.579 km (8.4 mi)	1x2	u/c	Chengdu-Kunming Railway
Mengyang Tunnel (勐养隧道)	Yunnan	13.539 km (8.4 mi)	1x2	2021	Yuxi-Mohan Railway
Wanggangshan Tunnel (王岗山隧道)	Yunnan	13.508 km (8.393 mi)	1x2	2021	Yuxi-Mohan Railway
Dangshun Tunnel (当顺隧道)	Qinghai	13.493 km (8.384 mi)	1x2	u/c	Xining–Chengdu high-speed railway
Dayi Tunnel (打易隧道)	Guizhou	13.475 km (8.373 mi)	1x1	u/c	Huangtong-Baise railway
Fengjie Tunnel (奉节隧道)	Chongqing	13.473 km (8.372 mi)	1x2	2022	Zhengzhou-Wanzhou Railway
Wanshoushan Tunnel (万寿山隧道)	Chongqing	13.468 km (8.4 mi)	1x2	2013	Chongqing−Lichuan Railway
Henggang Tunnel (横岗隧道)	Guangdong	13.450 km (8.357 mi)	1x2	u/c	Pinghu'nan-Yantiangang railway
Xiaoan Tunnel (小安隧道)	Sichuan-	13.430 km (8.345 mi)	1x2	2017	Xi'an-Chengdu High Speed Railway
Jueshan Tunnel (珏山隧道)	Shanxi-Henan	13.421 km (8.3 mi)	1x2	2020	Taiyuan-Jiaozuo Intercity Railway
Baimashan Tunnel (白马山隧道)	Chongqing	13.407 km (8.3 mi)	1x2	u/c	Chongqing-Changsha High Speed Railway
Jiaozishan Tunnel (骄子山隧道)	Yunnan	13.404 km (8.3 mi)	1x2	2018	Chengdu-Kunming Railway
Daliangshan Tunnel (大梁山隧道)	Shanxi-Hebei	13.395 km (8.3 mi)	1x2	2019	Datong-Zhangjiakou High Speed Railway
Shanyang Tunnel (杉阳隧道)	Yunnan	13.390 km (8.3 mi)	1x1	2022	Dali–Ruili Railway
Tuoan Tunnel (妥安隧道)	Yunnan	13.371 km (8.3 mi)	1x2	2018	Chengdu–Kunming Railway
Pamuling Tunnel (保帕姆岭隧道)	Sichuan	13.340 km (8.3 mi)	1x2	u/c	Sichuan-Tibet railway
Baiyunshan Tunnel (白云山隧道)	Sichuan	13.340 km (8.3 mi)	1x2	2023	Chengdu-Zigong High-Speed Railway
Baoanyin #1 Tunnel (保安营一号隧道)	Sichuan	13.326 km (8.3 mi)	1x1	2020	Chengdu-Kunming Railway
Tuole Tunnel (妥乐隧道)	Guizhou	13.317 km (8.275 mi)	1x2	u/c	Panzhou-Xingyi HSR
Xin'an Tunnel (新安隧道)	Shaanxi	13.300 km (8.264 mi)	1x2	u/c	Baoji-Zhongwei railway
Changhongling Tunnel (长洪岭隧道)	Yunnan	13.299 km (8.3 mi)	1x2	2013	Chongqing−Lichuan Railway
Changlinggang Tunnel (长岭岗隧道)	Chongqing	13.295 km (8.3 mi)	1x2	u/c	Chongqing-Wanzhou HSR
Qinling Jiutianshan Tunnel (秦岭九天山隧道)	Shaanxi	13.293 km (8.3 mi)	1x2	u/c	Chongqing-Xi'an HSR
Dabieshan Tunnel (大别山隧道)	Hubei	13.256 km (8.2 mi)	1x2	2008	Hefei–Wuhan railway
Badong Tunnel (巴东隧道)	Hubei	13.248 km (8.232 mi)	1x2	2022	Zhengzhou-Wanzhou Railway
Wankai Tunnel (万开隧道)	Chongqing	13.211 km (8.209 mi)	1x2	u/c	Chengdu-Wanzhou high speed railway
Xilang Tunnel (西塱隧道)	Guangdong	13.210 km (8.208 mi)	1x2	u/c	Guangzhou Railway Hub connection line
Liaoxi Tunnel (辽西隧道)	Liaoning	13.205 km (8.2 mi)	1x2	2018	Beijing–Shenyang high-speed railway
Altyn-Tagh Tunnel (阿尔金山隧道)	Xinjiang	13.195 km (8.2 mi)	1x1	2020	Golmud-Korla Railway
Xiuning Tunnel (秀宁隧道)	Yunnan	13.187 km (8.2 mi)	1x2	2013	Guangtong–Kunming Railway
Gangwu Tunnel (岗乌隧道)	Guizhou	13.187 km (8.2 mi)	1x2	2016	Shanghai–Kunming High-Speed Railway
Songyang Tunnel (松阳隧道)	Zhejiang	13.166 km (8.2 mi)	1x1	2020	Quzhou-Ningde Railway
Huajiashang Tunnel (华家山隧道)	Shaanxi	13.153 km (8.2 mi)	1x2	u/c	Chongqing-Xi'an HSR
Dongjiang Tunnel (东江隧道)	Guangdong	13.123 km (8.2 mi)	2x1	2016	Guanzhou-Huizhou Intercity Railway
Yuanling Tunnel (园岭隧道)	Hubei	13.110 km (8.1 mi)	1x2	u/c	Xi'an-Shiyan HSR
Angsiduo Tunnel (昂思多隧道)	Qinghai	13.105 km (8.1 mi)	1x2	u/c	Xining-Chengdu Railway
Furenshan Tunnel (福仁山隧道)	Shaanxi	13.101 km (8.1 mi)	1x2	2017	Xi'an-Chengdu High Speed Railway
Xiapu Tunnel (霞浦隧道)	Fujian	13.099 km (8.1 mi)	1x2	2009	Wenzhou-Fuzhou Railway
Pingla Tunnel (平拉隧道)	Guangxi	13.086 km (8.131 mi)	1x1	u/c	Huangtong-Baise railway
Bayu Tunnel (巴玉隧道)	Tibet	13.073 km (8.1 mi)	1x1	2021	Lasa-Linzhi Railway
Mengla Tunnel (勐腊隧道)	Yunnan	13.018 km (8.1 mi)	1x1	2021	Yuxi-Mohan Railway
Youxi Tunnel (尤溪隧道)	Fujian	12.974 km (8.1 mi)	1x2	2013	Nanchang-Fuzhou Railway
Zhengpantai Tunnel (正盘台隧道)	Heibei	12.974 km (8.1 mi)	1x2	2019	Beijing–Zhangjiakou high-speed railway
Taihe Tunnel (太和隧道)	Guangdong	12.936 km (8.0 mi)	1x2	2020	Guanzhou-Shitan Railway
Shumuling Tunnel (树木岭隧道)	Hunan	12.860 km (8.0 mi)	2x1	2014	Changsha–Zhuzhou–Xiangtan Intercity Railway
Xinlian Tunnel (新莲隧道)	Yunnan	12.843 km (8.0 mi)	1x2	2016	Nanning–Kunming Railway
Wanjiashan Tunnel (万家山隧道)	Hubei	12.841 km (7.979 mi)	1x2	u/c	Zhengzhou-Wanzhou Railway Yichang Connection Line
Jiangjunling Tunnel (将军岭隧道)	Zhejiang	12.862 km (8.0 mi)	1x1	2021	Jinhua-Taizhou Railway
Yangjiaping Tunnel (杨家坪隧道)	Sichuan	12.815 km (8.0 mi)	2x1	2023	Chengdu-Lanzhou Railway
Shilou Tunnel (石楼隧道)	Shanxi	12.807 km (8.0 mi)	1x2	2014	Watang-Rizhao Railway
Daiyunshan #2 Tunnel (戴云山二号隧道)	Fujian	12.790 km (7.9 mi)	1x1	2022	Xingguo-Quanzhou Railway
Xingfu Tunnel (幸福隧道)	Yunnan	12.787 km (7.9 mi)	1x2	2016	Nanning-Kunming Railway
Changliangshan Tunnel (长梁山隧道)	Shanxi	12.784 km (7.9 mi)	1x2	2000	Shuozhou-Huanghua Railway
Jinpingyan Tunnel (金瓶岩隧道)	Sichuan	12.773 km (7.9 mi)	1x2	2023	Chengdu-Lanzhou Railway
Banzhulin Tunnel (斑竹林隧道)	Yunnan	12.758 km (7.9 mi)	1x1	2023	Xuyong-Bijie Railway
Ranjiawan Tunnel (冉家湾隧道)	Sichuan	12.754 km (7.9 mi)	1x2	2020	Chengdu-Kunming Railway
Baishan Tunnel (白山隧道)	Jilin	12.740 km (7.9 mi)	1x2	u/c	Shenyang-Baihe HSR
Chaoyang Tunnel (朝阳隧道)	Guizhou	12.734 km (7.9 mi)	1x2	2023	Guiyang–Nanning high-speed railway
Changlinggang Tunnel (长岭岗隧道)	Chongqing	12.725 km (7.9 mi)	1x2	u/c	Chongqing–Wanzhou high speed railway
Shengmu Tunnel (神木隧道)	Shaanxi	12.715 km (7.9 mi)	1x1	u/c	Shengmu-Watang Railway
Dongjin Tunnel (东晋隧道)	Shanxi	12.705 km (7.9 mi)	1x2	u/c	Taiyuan Railway Hub
Dananshan Tunnel (大南山隧道)	Guangdong	12.697 km (7.9 mi)	1x2	2013	Xiamen–Shenzhen high-speed railway
Changqingpo Tunnel (长庆坡隧道)	Yunnan	12.676 km (7.9 mi)	1x2	2015	Nanning-Kunming Railway
Liang'an Tunnel (两安隧道)	Guangxi	12.668 km (7.9 mi)	1x2	2014	Guiyang–Guangzhou high-speed railway
Tongka No2 Tunnel (同卡二号隧道)	Tibet	12.665 km (7.870 mi)	1x2	u/c	Sichuan-Tibet railway
Gaojiashan Tunnel (高家山隧道)	Gansu	12.643 km (7.9 mi)	1x2	2014	Lanzhou–Urumqi high-speed railway
Xiwuling Tunnel (西武岭隧道)	Anhui	12.629 km (7.8 mi)	1x2	2023	Nanchang-Jingdezhen-Huangshan HSR
Changshoushan Tunnel (长寿山隧道)	Gansu	12.625 km (7.8 mi)	1x2	2014	Lanzhou-Chongqing Railway
Hengqin Tunnel (横琴隧道)	Guangdong	12.585 km (7.8 mi)	2x1	2018	Zhuhai-Zhuhai Airport Railway
Huama Tunnel (化马隧道)	Gansu	12.574 km (7.8 mi)	1x2	2014	Lanzhou-Chongqing Railway
Shenmu Tunnel (神木隧道)	Shaanxi	12.574 km (7.8 mi)	1x1	u/c	Fenghong Railway
Qingliangshan Tunnel (清凉山隧道)	Shaanxi	12.553 km (7.8 mi)	1x2	2017	Xi'an-Chengdu High Speed Railway
Xiangshuwan Tunnel (香树湾隧道)	Chongqing - Hubei	12.475 km (7.8 mi)	1x2	2022	Zhengzhou–Wanzhou high-speed railway
Yakou Tunnel (垭口隧道)	Sichuan	12.447 km (7.7 mi)	1x2	2020	Chengdu-Kunming Railway
Beilingshan Tunnel (北岭山隧道)	Guangdong	12.438 km (7.7 mi)	1x2	2014	Nanning-Guangzhou Railway
Hejialiang Tunnel (何家梁隧道)	Shaanxi	12.405 km (7.7 mi)	1x2	2017	Xi'an-Chengdu High Speed Railway
Daping Tunnel (大坪隧道)	Yunnan	12.335 km (7.7 mi)	1x2	u/c	Chongqing–Kunming high-speed railway
Xinhua Tunnel (新华隧道)	Yunnan	12.332 km (7.7 mi)	1x1	2020	Dali-Lincang Railway
Wubao Tunnel (吴堡隧道)	Shaanxi	12.310 km (7.6 mi)	1x2	2011	Taiyuan-Zhongwei-Yinchuan Railway
East Qinling Tunnel (东秦岭隧道)	Shaanxi	12.268 km (7.6 mi)	1x2	2004	Nanjing–Xi'an Railway
Wumengshan #2 Tunnel (乌蒙山二号隧道)	Guizhou	12.260 km (7.6 mi)	1x2 (Note: 4 tracks in first 538m)	2012	Shanghai-Kunming Railway
Lihuading Tunnel (梨花顶隧道)	Beijing	12.245 mi (19.7 km)	1x2	2021	Beijing–Shenyang high-speed railway
Sanlian Tunnel (三联隧道)	Yunnan	12.214 mi (19.7 km)	1x2	2012	Shanghai-Kunming Railway
Wuzhishan Tunnel (五指山隧道)	Guangdong	12.208 km (7.6 mi)	1x2	2014	Chengdu-Kunming Railway
East Xiaoshan Tunnel (东崤山隧道)	Henan	12.192 km (7.6 mi)	1x1	u/c	Sanmengxia-Yangkou Railway
South Daiyunshan Tunnel (南戴云山隧道)	Fujian	12.169 km (7.6 mi)	1x2	2017	Nanping-Sanming-Longyan Railway
Jishou Tunnel (吉首隧道)	Hunan	12.162 km (7.6 mi)	1x2	2021	Zhangjiajie-Jishou-Huaihua Railway
Fengxiangyuan Tunnel (枫相院隧道)	Gansu	12.129 km (7.5 mi)	1x2	2014	Lanzhou-Chongqing Railway
Suide Tunnel (绥德隧道)	Shaanxi	12.125 km (7.5 mi)	1x2	2011	Taiyuan-Zhongwei Railway
Tongmai Tunnel (通麦隧道)	Tibet	12.100 km (7.519 mi)	1x2	u/c	Sichuan-Tibet railway
Yongshun Tunnel (永顺隧道)	Hunan	12.083 km (7.5 mi)	1x2	2021	Zhangjiajie-Jishou-Huaihua HSR
Zeya Tunnel (泽雅隧道)	Zhejiang	12.030 km (7.5 mi)	1x2	2014	Jinhua-Lishui-Wenzhou Railway
Jinjiaya Tunnel (金家岩隧道)	Sichuan	12.029 km (7.5 mi)	1x2	2017	Xi'an–Chengdu High-Speed Railway
Tianmushan Tunnel (天目山隧道)	Zhejiang-Anhui	12.013 km (7.5 mi)	1x2	2018	Hangzhou-Huangshan Railway
New Badaling Tunnel (新八达岭隧道)	Beijing	12.010 km (7.5 mi)	1x2	2021	Beijing Zhangjiakou High Speed Railway
Zongfa Tunnel (总发隧道)	Sichuan	11.973 km (7.4 mi)	1x2	2019	Chengdu-Kunming Railway
Poluyuan Tunnel (坡录元隧道)	Guangxi	12.005 km (7.5 mi)	1x2 (Note: 3 tracks in first 516m)	2015	Nanning-Kunming Railway
Chongqing Yantse River Tunnel (重庆长江隧道)	Chongqing	11.942 km (7.4 mi)	1x2	u/c	Chongqing–Changsha HSR
Wolongshan Tunnel (卧龙山隧道)	Shanxi	11.921 km (7.4 mi)	1x1	2017	Zhungeer-Shuozhou Railway
Ruyi Tunnel (如意隧道)	Shaanxi	11.920 km (7.4 mi)	1x2	2019	Haoji Railway
Zhugangshan Tunnel (朱岗山隧道)	Sichuan	11.900 km (7.4 mi)	1x2	u/c	Sichuan-Tibet railway
Ganxigou Tunnel (干溪沟隧道)	Chongqing	11.883 km (7.4 mi)	1x2	2022	Zhengzhou–Wanzhou high-speed railway
Dadushan Tunnel (大独山隧道)	Guizhou	11.882 km (7.4 mi)	1x2	2014	Shanghai-Kunming High-Speed Railway
Jiayuan Tunnel (贾塬隧道)	Gansu	11.870 km (7.4 mi)	1x2	2020	Xi'an-Yinchuan Railway
Sanqingshan Tunnel (三清山隧道)	Jiangxi	11.850 km (7.4 mi)	1x2	2015	Hefei-Fuzhou High-Speed Railway
Shitouzhai Tunnel (石头寨隧道)	Yunnan	11.842 km (7.4 mi)	1x2	2021	Yuxi-Mohan Railway
Chegan Tunnel (车赶隧道)	Shanxi	11.818 km (7.3 mi)	1x1 (Note: 2 tracks in last 1,244m)	2014	Taiyuan-Zhongwei-Yinchuan Railway Lülin Branch
Baicaoan Tunnel (白草鞍隧道)	Hebei	11.794 km (7.3 mi)	1x2	2014	Zhangjiakou-Tangshan Railway
Lingshangcun Tunnel (岭上村隧道)	Anhui	11.775 km (7.3 mi)	1x2	2024	Chizhou–Huangshan high-speed railway
Xianyan Tunnel (仙岩隧道)	Fujian	11.729 km (7.3 mi)	1x1	2020	Quzhou-Ningde Railway
Wudaoliang Tunnel (五道梁隧道)	Hebei	11.720 km (7.3 mi)	1x2	2014	Zhangjiakou-Tangshan Railway
Tianheshan Tunnel (天河山隧道)	Shanxi	11.695 km (7.3 mi)	1x1	2021	Xingtai-Heshun Railway
Xuefengshan #1 Tunnel (雪峰山一号隧道)	Hunan	11.670 km (7.3 mi)	1x2	2015	Shanghai–Kunming high-speed railway
Yangshan Tunnel (阳山隧道)	Shaanxi	11.668 mi (18.8 km)	1x2	2019	Haoji Railway
Gangmulashan Tunnel (岗木拉山隧道)	Tibet	11.660 mi (18.8 km)	1x1	2021	Lasa-Linzhi Railway
Damaidi Tunnel (大麦地隧道)	Yunnan	11.650 mi (18.7 km)	1x1	2020	Dali-Lincang Railway
Manmushu Tunnel (曼木树隧道)	Yunnan	11.638 mi (18.7 km)	1x1	2021	Yuxi-Mohan Railway
Huangjialiang Tunnel (黄家梁隧道)	Sichuan	11.632 mi (18.7 km)	1x2	2017	Xi'an–Chengdu high speed railway
Baozhen Tunnel (堡镇隧道)	Hubei	11.595 mi (18.7 km) & 11.563 mi (18.6 km)	2x1	2010	Yichang-Wanzhou Railway
Gelang Tunnel (革朗隧道)	Yunnan	11.574 km (7.2 mi)	1x2	2015	Nanning-Kunming Railway
Yingyaoshan Tunnel (鹰鹞山隧道)	Shanxi	11.572 km (7.2 mi)	1x1	2017	Zhungeer-Shenchi Railway
Milin Tunnel (米林隧道)	Tibet	11.560 km (7.2 mi)	1x1	2021	Lasa-Linzhi Railway
Leye Tunnel (乐业隧道)	Yunnan	11.544 km (7.2 mi)	1x2	u/c	Chongqing–Kunming high-speed railway
Shengnong Tunnel (神农隧道)	Shanxi	11.540 km (7.2 mi)	1x2	2020	Taiyuan-Jiaozuo Intercity Railway
Luluo Tunnel (路罗隧道)	Hebei	11.537 km (7.2 mi)	1x1	2022	Xingtai-Heshun Railway
Baotaishan Tunnel (宝台山隧道)	Fujian	11.534 mi (18.6 km)	1x2	2013	Nanchang-Fuzhou Railway
Xiaoling Tunnel (肖岭隧道)	Shaanxi	11.527 mi (18.6 km)	1x2	u/c	Shiyan–Xi'an high-speed railway
Nanliang Tunnel (南梁隧道)	Hebei-Shanxi	11.526 mi (18.5 km)	2x1 / 1x2 (Note: 2x1 changes to 1x2)	2009	Shijiazhuang–Taiyuan high-speed railway
Guodashan Tunnel (郭达山隧道)	Sichuan	11.500 km (7.1 mi)	1x2	u/c	Sichuan-Tibet railway
Xinshao Tunnel (新哨隧道)	Yunnan	11.496 km (7.1 mi)	1x2	2016	Yunnan–Guangxi railway
Taigu Tunnel (太谷隧道)	Shanxi	11.486 km (7.1 mi)	1x2	2020	Taiyuan-Jiaozuo Intercity Railway
Xiangjiang Tunnel (湘江隧道)	Hunan	11.450 km (7.1 mi)	2x1	2017	Changsha–Zhuzhou–Xiangtan intercity railway
Hengshan Tunnel (横山隧道)	Shaanxi	11.448 mi (18.4 km)	1x2	2011	Taiyuan-Zhongwei-Yinchuan Railway
Sanyang Tunnel (三阳隧道)	Fujian	11.410 mi (18.4 km)	1x1	2022	Xingguo-Quanzhou Railway
Dapingshan Tunnel (大坪山隧道)	Sichuan	11.344 mi (18.3 km)	1x2	2022	Chengdu-Kunming Railway
Mintai Tunnel (民太隧道)	Yunnan	11.343 km (7.0 mi)	1x2	2018	Chengdu-Kunming Railway
Jianping Tunnel (建平隧道)	Liaoning	11.340 km (7.0 mi)	1x2	2020	Kazuo-Chifeng High-Speed Railway
Huyinxishan Tunnel (胡营西山隧道)	Hebei	11.331 km (7.0 mi)	1x2	2018	Beijing–Shenyang high-speed railway
Changqing Tunnel (长青隧道)	Jilin	11.311 km (7.0 mi)	1x2	u/c	Shenyang-Baihe HSR
Shuozhou Tunnel (朔州隧道)	Shanxi	11.299 km (7.0 mi)	1x2	2014	Zhungeer-Shenchi Railway
Yanbian Tunnel (盐边隧道)	Sichuan	11.298 km (7.0 mi)	1x2	2019	Chengdu-Kunming Railway
Tongda Tunnel (通达隧道)	Yunnan	11.298 km (7.0 mi)	1x2	2021	Yuxi-Mohan Railway
Dongfeng Tunnel (东风隧道)	Yunnan	11.296 km (7.0 mi)	1x2	2015	Nanning-Kunming Railway
Qingyuan Tunnel (庆元隧道)	Zhejiang	11.292 km (7.0 mi)	1x1	2020	Quzhou-Ningde Railway
Qinling Cuihuashan Tunnel (秦岭翠华山隧道)	Shaanxi	11.271 mi (18.1 km)	1x2	2013	Xi'an-Ankang II Railway
Longchishan Tunnel (龙池山隧道)	Sichuan-Shaanxi	11.256 km (7.0 mi)	1x2	2014	Lanzhou-Chongqing Railway
Luoxiang Tunnel (洛香隧道)	Guizhou	11.232 km (7.0 mi)	1x2	2014	Guiyang–Guangzhou railway
Tiefengshan Tunnel (铁峰山隧道)	Chongqing	11.189 mi (18.0 km)	1x2	u/c	Chengdu–Dazhou–Wanzhou high-speed railway
Baotian Tunnel (保田隧道)	Guizhou	11.179 km (6.9 mi)	1x2	u/c	Panzhou–Xingyi HSR
New Yuanliangshan Tunnel (新圆梁山隧道)	Chongqing	11.172 mi (18.0 km)	1x2	2020	Chongqing–Huaihua railway
Zaosheng #3 Tunnel (早胜三号隧道)	Gansu	11.171 mi (18.0 km)	1x2	2020	Xi'an–Yinchuan railway
Jixin Tunnel (吉新隧道)	Sichuan	11.132 mi (17.9 km)	1x2	u/c	Chengdu-Kunming Railway
Tongchuan Tunnel (铜川隧道)	Shaanxi	11.098 mi (17.9 km)	1x2	u/c	Xi'an–Yan'an high-speed railway
Yegucun Tunnel (也古村隧道)	Tibet	11.084 km (6.887 mi)	1x2	u/c	Sichuan-Tibet railway
Yuanliangshan Tunnel (圆梁山隧道)	Chongqing	11.068 mi (17.8 km)	1x1 (Note: 2 tracks in first 948.5m)	2006	Chongqing-Huaihua Railway
Xingwangmao Tunnel (兴旺峁隧道)	Shaanxi	11.068 mi (17.8 km)	1x2	2011	Taiyuan-Zhongwei-Yinchuan Railway
Dongwuling Tunnel (东伍岭隧道)	Hebei	11.033 mi (17.8 km)	1x2	2018	Beijing–Shenyang high-speed railway
Yongshun Tunnel (永顺隧道)	Guangxi	11.014 km (6.8 mi)	1x2	2023	Guiyang–Nanning high-speed railway
Gongling Tunnel (公岭隧道)	Guangdong	10.990 mi (17.7 km)	1x2	u/c	Guangzhou–Zhanjiang high-speed railway
Gaoqing Tunnel (高青隧道)	Guangxi	10.953 km (6.8 mi)	1x2	2014	Guiyang–Guangzhou high-speed railway
Guihuayuan Tunnel (桂花园隧道)	Chongqing	10.944 km (6.8 mi)	1x2	u/c	Chongqing–Changsha HSR
Daliang Tunnel (大梁隧道)	Chongqing	10.942 mi (17.6 km)	1x2	2013	Chongqing–Huaihua railway
Shangtianling Tunnel (上田岭隧道)	Anhui	10.863 km (6.7 mi)	1x2	2024	Chizhou–Huangshan high-speed railway
Yanguoxia Tunnel (盐锅峡隧道)	Gansu	10.860 mi (17.5 km)	1x1	u/c	Lanzhou-Hezuo Railway
Qipanshi Tunnel (棋盘石隧道)	Fujian	10.808 mi (17.4 km)	1x2	2013	Nanchang-Fuzhou Railway
Pazhou Tunnel (琶洲隧道)	Guangdong	10.800 mi (17.4 km)	2x1	u/c	Guangzhou–Dongguan–Shenzhen intercity railway
Xinshouliang Tunnel (新寿梁隧道)	Shaanxi	10.797 km (6.7 mi)	1x2	2020	Xi'an-Yinchuan Railway
Nanzhushan Tunnel (楠竹山隧道)	Chongqing	10.794 km (6.7 mi)	1x2	u/c	Chongqing–Changsha HSR
Jinzhai Tunnel (金寨隧道)	Anhui	10.766 mi (17.3 km)	1x2	2008	Hefei-Wuhan Railway
Qianshan Tunnel (乾山隧道)	Fujian	10.743 mi (17.3 km)	1x2	2017	Nanping-Sanming-Longyan Railway
Keshiketeng Tunnel (克什克腾隧道)	Inner Mongolia	10.741 km (6.7 mi)	1x2	u/c	Jining–Tongliao railway
Weijiashan Tunnel (魏家山隧道)	Hubei	10.738 km (6.7 mi)	1x2	u/c	Zhengzhou-Wanzhou HSR Yixing Connection Line
Tongchuan Tunnel (铜川隧道)	Shaanxi	10.730 mi (17.3 km)	1x2	u/c	Xi'an-Yan'an High Speed Railway
Duanjiaping Tunnel (段家坪隧道)	Shaanxi	10.728 mi (17.3 km)	1x2	2019	Haoji Railway
Lianyunshan Tunnel (连云山隧道)	Hunan	10.704 mi (17.2 km)	1x1	2019	Haoji Railway
Xishuangbanna Tunnel (西双版纳隧道)	Yunnan	10.680 mi (17.2 km)	1x2	2021	Yuxi-Mohan Railway
Jinci Tunnel (晋祠隧道)	Shanxi	10.671 mi (17.2 km)	1x2	2019	Taiyuan SW Loop Railway
Yushe Tunnel (榆社隧道)	Shanxi	10.671 mi (17.2 km)	1x2	2020	Taiyuan-Jiaozuo Intercity Railway
Yangmeishan Tunnel (杨梅山隧道)	Fujian	10.669 km (6.6 mi)	1x2	2023	Fuzhou–Xiamen high-speed railway
Quao Tunnel (曲奥隧道)	Gansu	10.669 km (6.6 mi)	1x2	u/c	Lanzhou-Hezuo Railway
Hanjiaping Tunnel (韩家坪隧道)	Yunnan	10.663 km (6.6 mi)	1x2	u/c	Chongqing–Kunming high-speed railway
New Dabashan Tunnel (新大巴山隧道)	Shaanxi-Sichuan	10.658 mi (17.2 km)	2x1	2009	Chongqing-Xiangyang 2nd Railway
Dajinshan Tunnel (大金山隧道)	Yunnan	10.657 mi (17.2 km)	1x2	2021	Yuxi–Mohan railway
Fuchuan Tunnel (福川隧道)	Gansu	10.649 mi (17.1 km)	1x2	2014	Lanzhou–Urumqi high speed railway
Huanggang Tunnel (黄岗隧道)	Guizhou	10.648 km (6.6 mi)	1x2	2014	Guiyang–Guangzhou high-speed railway
Luojiashan Tunnel (罗家山隧道)	Hubei	10.640 mi (17.1 km)	1x2	2022	Zhengzhou–Wanzhou high-speed railway
Linxian Tunnel (临县隧道)	Shanxi	10.632 mi (17.1 km)	1x2	2014	Central and Southern Shanxi railway
Gutian Tunnel (古田隧道)	Fujian	10.627 km (6.6 mi)	1x2	2015	Hefei-Fuzhou High-Speed Railway
Hongdoushan Tunnel (红豆山隧道)	Yunnan	10.616 km (6.6 mi)	1x1	2020	Dali-Lincang Railway
Yuanbaoshan Tunnel (圆宝山隧道)	Yunnan	10.606 km (6.6 mi)	1x1	2023	Lijiang-Shangri-la Railway
Ganjia Tunnel (甘加隧道)	Gansu	10.594 km (6.6 mi)	1x2	u/c	Xining-Chengdu Railway
Dujiashan Tunnel (杜家山隧道)	Shaanxi	10.586 km (6.6 mi)	1x2	2017	Yangpingguan-Ankang Railway
Fengyeling Tunnel (枫叶岭隧道)	Jilin	10.565 km (6.6 mi)	1x2	u/c	Shenyang-Baihe HSR
Qiyueshan Tunnel (齐岳山隧道)	Hubei	10.528 mi (16.9 km)	1x2	2010	Yichang-Wanzhou Railway
Minqing Tunnel (闽清隧道)	Fujian	10.518 km (6.5 mi)	1x2	2015	Hefei-Fuzhou High-Speed Railway
Xixian Tunnel (隰县隧道)	Shanxi	10.512 mi (16.9 km)	1x2	2014	Central and Southern Shanxi Railway
Lianhuashan Tunnel (莲花山隧道)	Fujian	10.510 mi (16.9 km)	1x1	2021	Pucheng-Meizhou Railway
Zecha Tunnel (则岔隧道)	Gansu	10.481 km (6.5 mi)	1x2	u/c	Xining-Chengdu Railway
Wujiacha Tunnel (吴家岔隧道)	Gansu	10.456 mi (16.8 km)	1x2	2017	Baoji-Lanzhou High-Speed Railway
Eling Tunnel (鹅岭隧道)	Jiangxi	10.445 mi (16.8 km)	1x1	2013	Hengyang-Chaling-Ji'an Railway
Dushan No2 Tunnel (独山二号隧道)	Guizhou	10.437 km (6.5 mi)	1x2	2023	Guiyang–Nanning high-speed railway
Zongga #1 Tunnel (宗嘎一号隧道)	Tibet	10.410 km (6.5 mi)	1x1	2014	Lhasa–Shigatse Railway
Yangliucun Tunnel (杨柳村隧道)	Chongqing	10.410 km (6.5 mi)	1x2	u/c	Chongqing–Changsha HSR
Baocun Tunnel (鲍村隧道)	Zhejiang	10.404 km (6.5 mi)	1x2	2023	Ningbo-Jinhua Railway
Pingbian Tunnel (屏边隧道)	Yunnan	10.381 km (6.5 mi)	1x1	2014	Mengzi–Hekou Railway
Yongle Tunnel (永乐隧道)	Shaanxi	10.381 km (6.5 mi)	1x2	2020	Xi'an-Yinchuan Railway
Guchengling Tunnel (古城岭隧道)	Gansu	10.365 km (6.4 mi)	1x2	2017	Baoji-Lanzhou High-Speed Railway
Jiangjiashan Tunnel (蒋家山隧道)	Shaanxi	10.358 km (6.4 mi) & 9.493 km (5.9 mi)	2x1	2019	Yangquanguan-Ankang Railway
San'eshan Tunnel (三峨山隧道)	Sichuan	10.352 km (6.4 mi)	1x2	2022	Chengdu-Kunming Railway
Xingping #1 Tunnel (兴平一号隧道)	Guangxi	10.350 km (6.4 mi)	1x2	u/c	Guiyang–Nanning high-speed railway
Nijiacun Tunnel (倪家村隧道)	Yunnan	10.349 km (6.4 mi)	1x2	u/c	Chongqing–Kunming high-speed railway
Xingguo Tunnel (兴国隧道)	Jiangxi	10.345 km (6.4 mi)	1x2	2019	Nanchang–Ganzhou high-speed railway
Xiushan Tunnel (秀山隧道)	Yunnan	10.302 mi (16.6 km)	1x1	2013	Yuxi-Mengzi Railway
Nanmengkou Tunnel (南门口隧道)	Fujian	10.301 mi (16.6 km)	1x2	2017	Nanping-Sanming-Longyan Railway
Qixingfeng Tunnel (七星峰隧道)	Heilongjiang	10.291 mi (16.6 km)	1x2	2021	Mudanjiang-Jiamusi High Speed Railway
Longnan Tunnel (龙南隧道)	Jiangxi	10.245 mi (16.5 km)	1x2	2021	Ganzhou–Shenzhen high-speed railway
Qingxing Tunnel (庆兴隧道)	Shaanxi	10.240 mi (16.5 km)	1x2	2010	Baotou-Xi'an Railway
Mufeiling Tunnel (木匪岭隧道)	Zhejiang	10.240 mi (16.5 km)	1x2	2024	Hangzhou-Wenzhou high speed railway
Lishi Tunnel (离石隧道)	Shanxi	10.236 mi (16.5 km)	1x2	2011	Taiyuan–Zhongwei–Yinchuan railway
Xianghe Tunnel (祥和隧道)	Yunnan	10.220 mi (16.4 km)	1x2	2017	Guangtong-Dali Railway
Xinbin Tunnel (新宾隧道)	Liaoning	10.207 km (6.3 mi)	1x2	u/c	Shenyang-Baihe HSR
Fanjiashan Tunnel (范家山隧道)	Shanxi	10.190 mi (16.4 km)	1x2	2014	Watang-Rizhao Railway
Gayi Tunnel (嘎益隧道)	Tibet	10.190 mi (16.4 km)	1x2	u/c	Sichuan-Tibet railway
Shiziyang Tunnel 狮子洋隧道	Guangdong	10.180 mi (16.4 km)	2x1	2011	Guangzhou–Shenzhen–Hong Kong Express Rail Link
Pingshang Tunnel (坪上隧道)	Chongqing	10.180 mi (16.4 km)	1x2	u/c	Chongqing–Changsha HSR
Xiangyuan Tunnel (襄垣隧道)	Shanxi	10.155 mi (16.3 km)	1x2	2020	Taiyuan-Jiaozuo Intercity Railway
Qingyang Tunnel (青阳隧道)	Shandong	10.140 mi (16.3 km)	1x2	2018	Jinan-Qingdao High Speed Railway
Beitaizi Tunnel (北台子隧道)	Hebei	10.130 mi (16.3 km)	1x2	2018	Beijing–Shenyang high-speed railway
Yongxing No1 Tunnel (永兴一号隧道)	Guangxi	10.130 mi (16.3 km)	1x2	2023	Guiyang–Nanning high-speed railway
Yujiashan Tunnel (余家山隧道)	Hubei	10.125 mi (16.3 km)	1x2	2019	Wuhan–Shiyan intercity railway
Liuyanghe Tunnel 浏阳河隧道	Hunan	10.115 mi (16.3 km)	1x2	2009	Wuhan–Guangzhou high-speed railway
Huangshitai Tunnel (黄石台隧道)	Hubei	10.114 mi (16.3 km)	1x2	u/c	Zhongwei–Lanzhou high speed railway
Xingshan Tunnel (兴山隧道)	Hubei	10.085 km (6.3 mi)	1x2	2022	Zhengzhou–Wanzhou high-speed railway
Dayaoshan#1 Tunnel (大瑶山一号隧道)	Guangdong	10.081 km (6.3 mi)	1x2	2009	Wuhan–Guangzhou high-speed railway
Jiangjunzhai Tunnel (将军寨隧道)	Fujian	10.077 km (6.3 mi)	1x1	u/c	Xingguo-Quanzhou Railway
Mengcun Tunnel (孟村隧道)	Yunnan	10.068 km (6.3 mi)	1x2	2016	Kunming-Nanning Railway
Lafashan Tunnel (拉法山隧道)	Jilin	10.035 km (6.2 mi)	1x2	2015	Changchun-Hunchun Intercity Railway
Fuyinzi Tunnel (付营子隧道)	Hebei	10.023 km (6.2 mi)	1x2	2014	Zhangjiakou-Tangshan Railway
Wei River Tunnel (渭河隧道)	Gansu	10.016 km (6.2 mi)	1x2	2017	Baoji-Lanzhou High Speed Railway
Bailuoshan Tunnel (白罗山隧道)	Zhejiang	10.006 km (6.2 mi)	1x2	2022	Hangzhou-Shaoxing-Taizhou intercity railway
Zhongxing Tunnel (中兴隧道)	Chongqing	10.005 km (6.2 mi)	1x2	u/c	Chongqing–Changsha HSR
New Baishatuo Tunnel (新白沙沱隧道)	Chongqing	10.004 km (6.2 mi)	1x1	2020	Chongqing-Huaihua Railway 2nd Line

== See also ==
- List of tunnels in China
- List of longest tunnels
- List of tunnels by location
- List of long tunnels by type
- Rail transport in China
