= List of longest railway tunnels =

Tunnel

This page presents a list of the longest railway tunnels of the world, excluding subway tunnel sections.

== World's longest railway tunnels in use ==
Name	Location	Length	Year completed	Line
Gotthard Base Tunnel	Switzerland (Alps)	57.104 km (35.5 mi) & 57.017 km (35.4 mi), 2 tubes	2016	new Gotthard railway
Seikan Tunnel	Japan (Tsugaru Strait)	53.85 km (33.5 mi)	1988	Kaikyo Line (Hokkaidō Shinkansen)
Channel Tunnel	France/United Kingdom (English Channel)	50.45 km (31.3 mi), 3 tubes	1994	High Speed 1 (UK) / LGV Nord (France)
Yulhyeon Tunnel	South Korea (Gyeonggi)	50.3 km (31.3 mi)	2016	Suseo–Pyeongtaek high-speed railway (SRT)
Shanghai Airport Tunnel	China (Shanghai)	40.188 km (25.0 mi)	2024	Shanghai Airports Connection Rail Line
Songshan Lake Tunnel	China (Dongguan)	38.813 km (24.1 mi), 2 tubes	2016	Dongguan–Huizhou Intercity Railway
Pearl River Tunnel	China (Guangdong)	36.043 km (22.4 mi), 2 tubes	2025	Guangzhou–Foshan circular intercity railway
Shenzhen Hong Kong Tunnel	China (Shenzhen)/Hong Kong	35.655 km (22.155 mi), 2 tubes	2018	Guangzhou-Shenzhen-Hong Kong Link
Lötschberg Base Tunnel	Switzerland (Bernese Alps)	34.576 km (21.485 mi) & 27.2 km (16.9 mi), 2 tubes	2007	Lötschbergbahn; Brig - Thun (- Bern - Basel)
Koralm Tunnel	Austria (Koralpe)	32.9 km (20.4 mi)	2025	Koralm Railway
New Guanjiao Tunnel	China (Qinghai)	32.645 km (20.285 mi), 2 tubes	2014	Qinghai–Tibet Railway
Guadarrama Tunnel	Spain (Sierra de Guadarrama)	28.418 km (17.658 mi) & 28.407 km (17.651 mi), 2 tubes	2007	Madrid–Asturias High-Speed Rail (Madrid – Valladolid)
Ping'an Tunnel	China (Sichuan)	28.398 km (17.6 mi) & 28.428 km (17.664 mi), 2 tubes	2023	Chengdu–Lanzhou Railway
West Qinling Tunnel	China (Gansu)	28.236 km (17.545 mi), 2 tubes	2016	Chongqing–Lanzhou railway
Taihang Tunnel	China (Shanxi)	27.848 km (17.304 mi) & 27.839 km (17.298 mi), 2 tubes	2007	Shijiazhuang–Taiyuan High-Speed Railway
Hakkōda Tunnel	Japan (Hakkōda Mountains)	26.445 km (16.432 mi)	2010	Tōhoku Shinkansen
Iwate-Ichinohe Tunnel	Japan (Ōu Mountains)	25.81 km (16.0 mi)	2002	Tōhoku Shinkansen
Musil Tunnel	South Korea (Kangwon)	25.080 km (15.584 mi)	2021	Jungang Line
Pajares Base Tunnel	Spain (Cantabrian Mountains)	24.6 km (15.3 mi), 2 tubes	2023	Madrid–Asturias High-Speed Railway (León – Gijón)
Lainzer/Wienerwaldtunnel	Austria (Vienna)	23.844 km (14.816 mi), partially 2 tubes	2012	Westbahn
South Lüliangshan Tunnel	China (Shanxi)	23.47 km (14.6 mi) & 23.44 km (14.6 mi), 2 tubes	2014	Watang–Rizhao railway
Desheng Tunnel	China (Sichuan)	22.943 km (14.3 mi)	2023	Chengdu–Lanzhou Railway
Xiaoshan Tunnel	China (Henan)	22.771 km (14.149 mi) & 22.751 km (14.137 mi), 2 tubes	2019	Haoji Railway
Taiwan railway underground tunnel in Taipei–Keelung Metropolitan Area	Taiwan(Taipei)	22.672 km TRA (14.09 mi) & 21.508 km THSR (13.4 mi)	2008	Taiwan railway & Taiwan High Speed Rail
Middle Tianshan Tunnel	China (Xinjiang)	22.467 km (13.960 mi) & 22.449 km (13.949 mi), 2 tubes	2014	Turpan-Kuqa County Railway
Iiyama Tunnel	Japan (Iiyama)	22.251 km (13.826 mi)	2015	Hokuriku Shinkansen
Daishimizu Tunnel	Japan (Mount Tanigawa)	22.2 km (13.8 mi)	1982	Jōetsu Shinkansen
Qingyunshan Tunnel	China (Fujian)	22.175 km (13.779 mi) & 21.843 km (13.573 mi), 2 tubes	2013	Xiangtang–Putian railway
Xiaoxiangling Tunnel	China (Sichuan)	21.775 km (13.5 mi)	2022	Chengdu–Kunming Railway Double Track
Daegwallyeong Tunnel	South Korea (Kangwon)	21.755 km (13.518 mi)	2017	Gyeonggang line
Yanshan Tunnel	China (Hebei)	21.178 km (13.159 mi) & 21.154 km (13.144 mi)	2014	Tangshan–Baotou railway
Lüliangshan Tunnel	China (Shanxi)	20.785 km (12.915 mi) & 20.734 km (12.884 mi), 2 tubes	2011	Taiyuan-Zhongwei-Yinchuan railway
Geumjeong Tunnel	South Korea (Busan)	20.3 km (12.6 mi)	2010	Gyeongbu High Speed Railway
Dangjinshan Tunnel	China (Gansu)	20.1 km (12.5 mi)	2019	Golmud–Dunhuang railway
Wushaoling Tunnel	China (Gansu)	20.06 km (12.5 mi) & 20.05 km (12.5 mi), 2 tubes	2006	Lanzhou - Ürümqi railway
Yuelongmeng Tunnel	China (Sichuan)	20.042 km (12.5 mi) & 19.981 km (12.4 mi), 2 tubes	2023	Chengdu–Lanzhou Railway
Simplon Tunnel	Italy/Switzerland (Lepontine Alps)	19.8 km (12.3 mi)	1906/1922	Genève/Basel - Brig - Novara/Milan
Shin Hokuriku Tunnel	Japan (Fukui)	19.760 km (12.3 mi)	2024	Hokuriku Shinkansen
Blix Tunnel	Norway (Oslo)	19.5 km (12.1 mi)	2023	Follo Line
Qamchiq Tunnel	Uzbekistan (Qurama Mountains)	19.2 km (11.9 mi)	2016	Angren-Pap Railway
Muzhailing Tunnel	China (Gansu)	19.115 km (11.878 mi) & 19.095 km (11.9 mi), 2 tubes	2017	Chongqing–Lanzhou railway
Vereina Tunnel	Switzerland (Silvretta)	19.1 km (11.9 mi)	1999	(Chur-) Klosters - Saglians
Xiaosanxia Tunnel	China (Chongqing)	18.954 km (11.777 mi)	2022	Zhengzhou-Wanzhou HSR
Xinhua Tunnel	China (Hubei)	18.790 km (11.676 mi)	2022	Zhengzhou-Wanzhou HSR
Shin Kanmon	Japan (Kanmon Straits)	18.7 km (11.6 mi)	1975	Sanyō Shinkansen
Vaglia	Italy (Tuscan-Emilian Apennines)	18.7 km (11.6 mi)	2009	Bologna–Florence high-speed railway
RER A Central Tunnel	France (Île-de-France)	18.5 km (11.5 mi)	1977	RER A
Apennine Base Tunnel	Italy (Apennine Mountains)	18.5 km (11.5 mi)	1934	Bologna - Florence
Qinling Tunnel	China (Shaanxi)	18.456 km (11.468 mi) & 18.452 km (11.466 mi), 2 tubes	2002/2005	Xi'an–Ankang railway
Zhongtiaoshan Tunnel	China (Shaanxi)	18.410 km (11.439 mi) & 18.405 km (11.436 mi), 2 tubes	2019	Haoji Railway
Dongming Tunnel	China (Zhejiang)	18.226 km (11.325 mi)	2022	Hangzhou–Shaoxing–Taizhou intercity railway
Shilin Tunnel	China (Yunnan)	18.208 km (11.314 mi)	2016	Nanning–Kunming High-Speed Railway
South Taihangshan Tunnel	China (Shanxi)	18.125 km (11.262 mi) & 18.108 km (11.252 mi), 2 tubes	2014	Shanxi–Henan–Shandong railway
Xi'anling Tunnel	China (Henan)	18.069 km (11.228 mi) & 18.063 km (11.224 mi), 2 tubes	2019	Haoji Railway
Yinpanshan Tunnel	China (Yunnan-Sichuan)	17.934 km (11.144 mi) & 17.891 km (11.117 mi), 2 tubes	2020	Chengdu–Kunming Railway Double Track
Xuefengshan Tunnel	China (Fujian)	17.842 km (11.087 mi) & 17.826 km (11.077 mi), 2 tubes	2013	Xiangtang–Putian railway
Xiangshan Tunnel	China (Ningxia)	17.765 km (11.0 mi)	2022	Yinchuan–Lanzhou high-speed railway
Xiuling Tunnel	China (Yunnan)	17.623 km (10.950 mi)	2022	Dali-Ruili railway
Gaoganshan Tunnel	China (Fujian)	17.612 km (10.944 mi) & 17.594 km (10.932 mi), 2 tubes	2013	Xiangtang–Putian railway
Jixin Tunnel	China (Sichuan)	17.607 km (10.940 mi)	2022	Chengdu–Kunming Railway Double Track
Jiufengshan #2 Tunnel	China (Fujian)	17.596 km (10.934 mi)	2020	Quzhou–Ningde railway
Yijun Tunnel	China (Shaanxi)	17.509 km (10.9 mi)	2025	Xi'an-Yan'an HSR
Anding Tunnel	China (Yunnan)	17.476 km (10.859 mi)	2021	Yuxi–Mohan railway
Wanhe Tunnel	China (Yunnan)	17.441 km (10.837 mi)	2021	Yuxi–Mohan railway
Dagala Tunnel	China (Tibet)	17.324 km (10.765 mi)	2021	Lhasa–Nyingchi railway
Pazhou Tunnel	China (Guangdong)	17.204 km (10.7 mi) & 17.017 km (10.6 mi)	2025	Pazhou–Lianhuashan intercity railway
Pingbu Tunnel	China (Guangdong)	17.185 km (10.678 mi)	2020	Guangzhou–Shenzhen intercity railway
Yongshouliang Tunnel	China (Shaanxi)	17.161 km (10.663 mi) & 17.155 km (10.660 mi), 2 tubes	2013	Xi'an–Pingliang railway
New Wushaoling Tunnel	China (Gansu)	17.125 km (10.641 mi)	2023	Lanzhou-Zhangye High Speed Railway
Huangyan Tunnel	China (Hunan)	17.030 km (10.582 mi)	2018	Huaihua–Shaoyang–Hengyang railway
Jiuwandashan #1 Tunnel	China (Guizhou)	17.012 km (10.571 mi)	2023	Guiyang–Nanning high-speed railway
Liupanshan Tunnel	China (Gansu)	16.725 km (10.392 mi) (Note: Two tracks in the first 574 m)	2015	Tianshui–Pingliang Railway
Jiufengshan #1 Tunnel	China (Fujian)	16.646 km (10.343 mi)	2019	Quzhou–Ningde railway
Hadapu Tunnel	China (Gansu)	16.6 km (10.3 mi) & 16.59 km (10.3 mi), 2 tubes	2016	Chongqing–Lanzhou Railway
Xiangjiang Tunnel	China (Hunan)	16.600 km (10.3 mi)	2017	Changsha–Zhuzhou–Xiangtan intercity railway
Wushan Tunnel	China (Chongqing)	16.571 km (10.297 mi)	2022	Zhengzhou-Wanzhou HSR
Sangzhuling Tunnel	China (Tibet)	16.449 km (10.221 mi)	2021	Lhasa–Nyingchi railway
Liutongzhai Tunnel	China (Sichuan)	16.312 km (10.136 mi)	2023	Chengdu–Lanzhou Railway
Rokkô Tunnel	Japan (Mount Rokkō)	16.3 km (10.1 mi)	1972	Sanyō Shinkansen
Fuxian Tunnel	China (Shaanxi)	16.293 km (10.1 mi)	2025	Xi'an-Yan'an HSR
Solan Tunnel	South Korea (Taebaek)	16.2 km (10.1 mi)	2012	Yeongdong Line
Taiyueshan Tunnel	China (Shanxi)	16.194 km (10.062 mi)	2014	Shanxi Central-South railway
Baoshan Tunnel	China (Yunnan)	16.097 km (10.002 mi)	2023	Dali-Ruili Railway
New Yan'an Tunnel	China (Shaanxi)	16.000 km (9.942 mi)	2025	Xi'an-Yan'an HSR
Münsterer Tunnel	Austria	15.99 km (9.9 mi)	2012	Neue Unterinntalbahn
Tianhuashan Tunnel	China (Shaanxi)	15.989 km (9.935 mi)	2017	Xi'an–Chengdu High-Speed Railway
Dabanshan Tunnel	China (Qinghai)	15.918 km (9.891 mi)	2014	Lanzhou–Ürümqi High-Speed Railway
Xiangshan Tunnel	China (Fujian)	15.917 km (9.890 mi) & 15.898 km (9.879 mi), 2 tubes	2012	Longyan–Xiamen Railway
Erqingshan Tunnel	China (Shanxi)	15.851 km (9.849 mi)	2014	Taiyuan-Xingxian Railway
Xinhua Tunnel	China (Yunnan)	15.845 km (9.846 mi)	2021	Yuxi–Mohan Railway
Terfener Tunnel	Austria	15.84 km (9.8 mi)	2012	Neue Unterinntalbahn
Heishan Tunnel	China (Gansu)	15.757 km (9.791 mi)	2017	Chongqing–Lanzhou Railway
Guanshan Tunnel	China (Gansu)	15.634 km (9.715 mi)	2015	Tianshui–Pingliang Railway
Daiyunshan Tunnel	China (Fujian)	15.623 km (9.708 mi) & 15.605 km (9.696 mi), 2 tubes	2013	Xiangtang–Putian Railway
Jiuwandashan #4 Tunnel	China (Guangxi)	15.485 km (9.622 mi)	2023	Guiyang–Nanning high-speed railway
Jiyi Tunnel	China (Shaanxi)	15.417 km (9.580 mi)	2019	Haoji Railway
Furka Base	Switzerland (Urner Alps)	15.4 km (9.6 mi)	1982	Andermatt - Brig
Ceneri Base Tunnel	Switzerland (Lugano)	15.4 km (9.6 mi)	2020	new Gotthard Railway
Haruna	Japan (Gunma Prefecture)	15.4 km (9.6 mi)	1982	Jōetsu Shinkansen
Jiulingshan Tunnel	China (Jiangxi)	15.371 km (9.551 mi)	2019	Haoji Railway
Severomuyskiy	Russia (Severomuysky Range)	15.343 km (9.5 mi)	2001	Baikal Amur Mainline
Monte Santomarco	Italy (Sila Mountains)	15.333 km (9.527 mi)	1987	Paola - Cosenza
Firenzuola	Italy (Tuscan-Emilian Apennines)	15.285 km (9.5 mi)	2009	Bologna–Florence high-speed railway
Changlong Tunnel	China (Guangdong)	15.259 km (9.482 mi)	2022	Foshan-Dongguan Intercity Railway
Ganzhuang Tunnel	China (Yunnan)	15.245 km (9.473 mi)	2021	Yuxi–Mohan Railway
Gorigamine Tunnel	Japan (Akaishi Mountains)	15.175 km (9.4 mi)	1997	Hokuriku Shinkansen
Liulangshan Tunnel	China (Shanxi)	15.175 km (9.429 mi)	2017	Zhungeer-Shuozhou Railway
Laoanshan Tunnel	China (Shaanxi)	15.161 km (9.421 mi)	2017	Xi'an–Chengdu High-Speed Railway
Xiangluping Tunnel	China (Hubei)	15.154 km (9.416 mi)	2022	Zhengzhou-Wanzhou HSR
Du'an Tunnel	China (Guangxi)	15.152 km (9.415 mi)	2023	Guiyang–Nanning high-speed railway
Chicheng Tunnel	China (Hebei)	15.047 km (9.350 mi)	2015	Tangshan–Baotou railway
Gotthard Rail Tunnel	Switzerland (Lepontine Alps)	15 km (9.3 mi)	1882	Gotthardbahn; Luzern/Zürich - Lugano - Milan
Zhujiashan Tunnel	China (Gansu)	14.949 km (9.289 mi)	2017	Baoji–Lanzhou High Speed Railway
Maotianshan Tunnel	China (Shaanxi)	14.915 km (9.268 mi)	2011	Baotou-Xi'an Railway
Nakayama	Japan (Nakayama Pass)	14.9 km (9.3 mi)	1982	Jōetsu Shinkansen
Daqinling Tunnel	China (Shaanxi)	14.846 km (9.225 mi)	2017	Xi'an–Chengdu High-Speed Railway
Xinping Tunnel	China (Yunnan)	14.835 km (9.218 mi)	2021	Yuxi–Mohan Railway
Bibanpo Tunnel	China (Yunnan & Guizhou)	14.756 km (9.169 mi)	2016	Shanghai–Kunming High-Speed Railway
Bijiashan Tunnel	China (Gansu)	14.751 km (9.166 mi)	2017	Baoji–Lanzhou High Speed Railway
Yulong Snow Mountain Tunnel	China (Yunnan)	14.745 km (9.2 mi)	2023	Lijiang-Shangri-La Railway
El Sargento #4	Peru	14.724 km (9.149 mi)	1975	Tacna-Moquegua
Mount Macdonald Tunnel	Canada (Rogers Pass)	14.7 km (9.134 mi)	1989	Calgary - Revelstoke
Yanshan Tunnel	China (Guizhou)	14.695 km (9.131 mi)	2014	Guiyang–Guangzhou High-Speed Railway
Qianshiyan Tunnel	China (Zhejiang)	14.684 km (9.124 mi)	2023	Ningbo-Jinhua Railway
Dapoling Tunnel	China (Yunnan)	14.665 km (9.112 mi)	2022	Dali-Ruili Railway
Wuyishan Tunnel	China (Fujian & Jiangxi)	14.659 km (9.109 mi)	2013	Xiangtang–Putian Railway
North Wuyishan Tunnel	China (Fujian & Jiangxi)	14.646 km (9.101 mi)	2015	Hefei–Fuzhou High-Speed Railway
Misaka Sasago Tunnel	Japan (Yamanashi)	14.613 km (9.080 mi)	1996	Chuo Shinkansen (Yamanashi Test Track)
Lötschberg	Switzerland (Bernese Alps)	14.6 km (9.1 mi)	1913	Lötschbergbahn; Brig - Thun (- Bern - Basel)
Romeriksporten	Norway (Østmarka)	14.6 km (9.1 mi)	1999	Gardermobanen
Sandu Tunnel	China (Guizhou)	14.598 km (9.071 mi)	2014	Guiyang–Guangzhou High-Speed Railway
Changleshan Tunnel	China (Zhejiang)	14.597 km (9.070 mi)	2020	Quzhou–Ningde railway
Hongshiyan Tunnel	China (Yunnan)	14.580 km (9.060 mi)	2015	Nanning–Kunming High-Speed Railway
Baokang Tunnel	China (Hubei)	14.574 km (9.056 mi)	2022	Zhengzhou-Wanzhou HSR
Fajiushan Tunnel	China (Shanxi)	14.573 km (9.055 mi)	2014	Shanxi Central-South Railway
Duoji Tunnel	China (Yunnan)	14.539 km (9.034 mi)	2021	Yuxi–Mohan Railway
Dazhongshan Tunnel	China (Henan)	14.533 km (9.030 mi)	2019	Haoji Railway
Tianchiping Tunnel	China (Gansu)	14.528 km (9.027 mi)	2016	Chongqing–Lanzhou Railway
Taiping Tunnel	China (Guangdong)	14.49 km (9.00 mi)	2019	Guangzhou–Shenzhen intercity railway
Dazhushan Tunnel	China (Yunnan)	14.484 km (9.000 mi)	2022	Dali-Ruili Railway
Fengshun Tunnel	China (Guangdong)	14.407 km (8.952 mi)	2019	Meizhou–Chaoshan railway
Dechang Tunnel	China (Sichuan)	14.365 km (8.926 mi)	2021	Chengdu–Kunming Railway Double Track
Dayaoshan Tunnel	China (Guangdong)	14.295 km (8.883 mi)	1987	Beijing - Guangzhou Railway
Binxian Tunnel	China (Shaanxi)	14.251 km (8.855 mi)	2020	Yinchuan–Xi'an high-speed railway
Baekwoon Tunnel	South Korea (Kangwon)	14.239 km (8.8 mi)	2021	Jungang line
Dajianshan Tunnel	China (Yunnan)	14.197 km (8.822 mi)	2021	Yuxi–Mohan Railway
Deli Tunnel	China (Shaanxi)	14.167 km (8.803 mi)	2017	Xi'an–Chengdu High-Speed Railway
Aobaoliang Tunnel	China (Inner Mongolia)	14.123 km (8.776 mi)	2017	Hohhot-Zhungeer-Erdos Railway
Jinguashan Tunnel	China (Fujian)	14.097 km (8.759 mi)	2013	Xiangtang–Putian Railway
Liulang Tunnel	China (Yunnan)	14.09 km (8.76 mi)	2016	Nanning–Kunming High-Speed Railway
Yanmengguan Tunnel	China (Shanxi)	14.085 km (8.752 mi)	2014	Datong–Xi'an HSR
Yuezhishan Tunnel	China (Sichuan)	14.085 km (8.752 mi)	2022	Chengdu–Kunming Railway Double Track
Linbaoshan Tunnel	China (Yunnan)	14.076 km (8.746 mi)	2020	Dali-Lincang Railway
Shiziyuan Tunnel	China (Sichuan)	14.069 km (8.7 mi)	2023	Chengdu–Lanzhou Railway
Tianpingshan Tunnel	China (Guangxi)	14.012 km (8.707 mi)	2014	Guiyang–Guangzhou High-Speed Railway

== World's longest railway tunnels under construction ==
Name	Location	Length	Expected completion	Line
Mont d'Ambin Base Tunnel	France/Italy (Cottian Alps)	57.5 km (35.7 mi)	2032	Lyon Turin Ferroviaire
Brenner Base Tunnel	Austria/Italy (Stubai Alps)	55 km (34.2 mi)	2032	Brenner Railway
Yigong Tunnel	China (Tibet)	42.362 km (26.3 mi)	2030	Sichuan-Tibet railway
Sejila Mountain Tunnel	China (Tibet)	37.965 km (23.6 mi)	2030	Sichuan-Tibet railway
Metropolitan Area Tunnel No. 1	Japan (Tokyo)	36.924 km (22.9 mi)	2027	Chūō Shinkansen
Gaoligongshan Tunnel	China (Yunnan)	34.538 km (21.5 mi)	2028	Dali-Ruili Railway
Duomuge Tunnel	China (Tibet)	34.348 km (21.3 mi)	2030	Sichuan-Tibet railway
Chukyo Area Tunnel No.1	Japan (Aichi)	34.210 km (21.3 mi)	2027	Chūō Shinkansen
Deda Tunnel	China (Sichuan)	33.350 km (20.7 mi)	2030	Sichuan-Tibet railway
Haizishan Tunnel	China (Sichuan)	33.020 km (20.5 mi)	2030	Sichuan-Tibet railway
Oshima Tunnel	Japan (Hokkaido)	32.675 km (20.3 mi)	2031	Hokkaidō Shinkansen
Layue Tunnel	China (Tibet)	31.675 km (19.7 mi)	2030	Sichuan-Tibet railway
Mangkangshan Tunnel	China (Tibet)	30.675 km (19.1 mi)	2030	Sichuan-Tibet railway
Zilashan Tunnel	China (Tibet)	30.010 km (18.6 mi)	2030	Sichuan-Tibet railway
Shenwan Tunnel	China (Guangdong)	29.944 km (18.6 mi)	2028	Shenzhen-Zhanjiang high-speed railway
Boshulaling Tunnel	China (Tibet)	29.068 km (18.1 mi)	2030	Sichuan-Tibet railway
Milashan Tunnel	China (Sichuan)	29.030 km (18.0 mi)	2030	Sichuan-Tibet railway
Yelashan Tunnel	China (Tibet)	28.639 km (17.8 mi)	2030	Sichuan-Tibet railway
Pingshandong Tunnel	China (Guangdong)	27.885 km (17.327 mi)	2025	Shenzhen-Shanwei HSR
Valico Tunnel	Italy (Liguria, Piedmont)	27.342 km (17.0 mi)	2026	Tortona–Genoa high-speed railway
Semmering Base Tunnel	Austria (Raxalpe)	27.3 km (17.0 mi)	2030	Southern Railway
Hirpinia Tunnel	Italy (Campania)	27 km (16.78 mi)	2027	Naples–Foggia railway
Baolingshan Tunnel	China (Sichuan)	26.547 km (16.5 mi)	2030	Sichuan-Tibet railway
Sasson Tunnel	Japan (Hokkaido)	26.23 km (16.3 mi)	2031	Hokkaidō Shinkansen
Gongjue Tunnel	China (Tibet)	26.175 km (16.3 mi)	2030	Sichuan-Tibet railway
Southern Alps Tunnel	Japan (Nagano)	25.019 km (15.5 mi)	2027	Chūō Shinkansen
Yiliang Tunnel	China (Yunnan)	24.832 km (15.430 mi) & 24.784 km (15.400 mi)	2027	Chongqing-Kunming High Speed Railway
Duoji Tunnel	China (Tibet)	24.188 km (15.0 mi)	2030	Sichuan-Tibet railway
Qiazilashan Tunnel	China (Sichuan)	23.980 km (14.9 mi)	2030	Sichuan-Tibet railway
Central Alps Tunnel	Japan (Nagano)	23.288 km (14.5 mi)	2027	Chūō Shinkansen
Bangda Tunnel	China (Tibet)	22.985 km (14.3 mi)	2030	Sichuan-Tibet railway
Qinling Mabaishan Tunnel	China (Shaanxi)	22.922 km (14.2 mi)	2026	Xi'an–Shiyan HSR
Ganqing Tunnel	China (Gansu, Qinghai)	22.38 km (13.9 mi)	2028	Chengdu–Lanzhou Railway
Qianhuang Tunnel	China (Guangdong)	22.218 km (13.8 mi)	2026	Guangzhou-Shenzhen Intercity Railway
Xigu Tunnel	China (Gansu)	22.055 km (13.7 mi)	2027	Lanzhou-Hezuo Railway
Haidong Nanshan Tunnel	China (Qinghai)	21.595 km (13.4 mi)	2028	Xining-Chengdu Railway
Kangyu Tunnel	China (Tibet)	21.340 km (13.3 mi)	2030	Sichuan-Tibet railway
Zhazong Tunnel	China (Tibet)	21.235 km (13.2 mi)	2030	Sichuan-Tibet railway
Binghui Tunnel	China (Yunnan)	21.170 km (13.2 mi)	2026	Chongqing-Kunming High Speed Railway
Thane Creek Tunnel	India (Mumbai)	21.150 km (13.1 mi)	2028	Mumbai–Ahmedabad High Speed Railway
Kangding No2 Tunnel	China (Sichuan)	20.793 km (12.9 mi)	2030	Sichuan-Tibet railway
Honglashan Tunnel	China (Tibet)	20.220 km (12.6 mi)	2030	Sichuan-Tibet railway
Anhua Tunnel	China (Gansu)	19.98 km (12.4 mi)	2027	Tianshui-Longnan Railway
Alia Tunnel	Italy (Sicily)	19.9 km (12.4 mi)	2030	Palermo-Catania Railway
New Maijishan Tunnel	China (Gansu)	19.818 km (12.3 mi)	2027	Tianshui-Longnan Railway
Tanglangshan Tunnel	China (Guangdong)	19.19 km (11.92 mi)	2025	Shenzhen-Shanwei HSR
Xiamen Bay Under-sea Tunnel	China (Fujian)	18.950 km (11.775 mi)	2027	Xiamen-Zhangzhou Intercity Railway
Qingling Taixing Tunnel	China (Shaanxi)	18.840 km (11.707 mi)	2026	Xi'an-Ankang HSR
Gaoersishan Tunnel	China (Sichuan)	18.840 km (11.707 mi)	2030	Sichuan-Tibet railway
Langlashan Tunnel	China (Tibet)	18.840 km (11.707 mi)	2030	Sichuan-Tibet railway
Longgang Tunnel	China (Guangdong)	18.323 km (11.385 mi)	2025	Shenzhen-Shanwei HSR
Geinieshan Tunnel	China (Sichuan)	18.175 km (11.293 mi)	2030	Sichuan-Tibet railway
Yingjinshan No1 Tunnel	China (Sichuan)	18.141 km (11.272 mi)	2030	Sichuan-Tibet railway
Xiling Tunnel	China (Shaanxi)	18.090 km (11.2 mi)	2026	Xi'an–Shiyan HSR
Shiribeshi Tunnel	Japan (Hokkaido)	17.975 km (11.2 mi)	2031	Hokkaido Shinkansen
Changdu Tunnel	China (Tibet)	17.801 km (11.061 mi)	2030	Sichuan-Tibet railway
Moxi Tunnel	China (Sichuan)	17.763 km (11.037 mi)	2030	Sichuan-Tibet railway
Fehmarn Belt tunnel	Germany/Denmark (Fehmarn Belt)	17.600 km (10.9 mi)	2029	Copenhagen–Hamburg
Kangding Tunnel	China (Sichuan)	17.300 km (10.750 mi)	2030	Sichuan-Tibet railway
Shangli Tunnel	China (Guangxi)	17.271 km (10.732 mi)	2028	Huangtong-Baise railway
Tateiwa Tunnel	Japan (Hokkaido)	16.980 km (10.6 mi)	2031	Hokkaido Shinkansen
Xingshandong Tunnel	China (Hubei)	16.883 km (10.5 mi)	2025	Yichang–Xingshan HSR
Baoyun Tunnel	China (Yunnan)	16.830 km (10.5 mi)	2026	Chongqing-Kunming High Speed Railway
Huashansong Tunnel	China (Yunnan)	16.460 km (10.2 mi)	2026	Chongqing-Kunming High Speed Railway
Xujiaping Tunnel	China (Gansu)	16.270 km (10.110 mi)	2027	Tianshui-Longnan Railway
Zhaotong Tunnel	China (Yunnan)	16.26 km (10.1 mi)	2026	Chongqing-Kunming High Speed Railway
Jintang Tunnel	China (Zhejiang)	16.180 km (10.054 mi)	2026	Zhoushan-Ningbo Railway
Dongdashan Tunnel	China (Tibet)	16.045 km (9.970 mi)	2030	Sichuan-Tibet railway
Chiltern tunnel	United Kingdom	16.04 km (9.97 mi)	2029	High Speed 2
New Santomarco Tunnel	Italy (Calabria)	15.8 km (9.8 mi)	2026	Paola - Cosenza railway
Uchiura Tunnel	Japan (Hokkaido)	15.560 km (9.7 mi)	2031	Hokkaido Shinkansen
Suzhou East Tunnel	China (Jiangsu)	15.565 km (9.672 mi)	2027	Nantong-Ningbo high-speed railway
Ludian Tunnel	China (Yunnan)	15.504 km (9.6 mi)	2026	Chongqing-Kunming High Speed Railway
Shenwan Tunnel	China (Guangdong)	15.469 km (9.612 mi)	2025	Shenzhen-Zhanjiang High-Speed Railway
Scaleres Tunnel	Italy (Trentino-Alto Adige)	15.4 km (9.56 mi)	2027	Brenner railway
Jifengshan Tunnel	China (Gansu)	15.385 km (9.560 mi)	2027	Tianshui-Longnan Railway
Ina Mountains Tunnel	Japan (Nagano)	15.300 km (9.5 mi)	2027	Chūō Shinkansen
Devprayag Rail Tunnel	India (Uttarakhand)	15.270 km (9.5 mi)	2025	Rishikesh–Karnaprayag Railway
Fengshuling Tunnel	China (Zhejiang)	15.185 km (9.436 mi)	2026	Quzhou-Lishui Railway
Huangzhuguan Tunnel	China (Gansu)	15.164 km (9.422 mi)	2027	Tianshui-Longnan Railway
Guifengshan Tunnel	China (Guangdong)	15.155 km (9.4 mi)	2026	Zhuhai-Zhaoqing HSR
Liulin Tunnel	China (Gansu)	15.152 km (9.415 mi)	2027	Tianshui-Longnan Railway
Pingluo Tunnel	China (Gansu)	15.032 km (9.340 mi)	2027	Tianshui-Longnan Railway
Daxing'anling Tunnel	China (Inner Mongolia)	14.970 km (9.302 mi)	2027	Harbin-Manzhouli Railway
Qunke Tunnel	China (Gansu)	14.955 km (9.3 mi)	2028	Chengdu–Lanzhou Railway
Duomuge Tunnel	China (Tibet)	14.884 km (9.248 mi)	2030	Sichuan-Tibet railway
Tiefengshan Tunnel	China (Chongqing)	14.783 km (9.186 mi)	2028	Chongqing-Xi'an HSR
Hengshan Tunnel	China (Shanxi)	14.76 km (9.2 mi)	2025	Jining–Datong–Yuanping HSR
Tianzhushan No1 Tunnel	China (Shaanxi)	14.742 km (9.160 mi)	2026	Xi'an–Shiyan HSR
Erlangshan Tunnel	China (Sichuan)	14.732 km (9.154 mi)	2030	Sichuan-Tibet railway
Dabieshan Tunnel	China (Anhui - Hubei)	14.698 km (9.133 mi)	2028	Shanghai-Chongqing-Chengdu High Speed Railway
Kaole Tunnel	China (Gansu)	14.659 km (9.109 mi)	2027	Lanzhou-Hezuo Railway
Tongbaiyuan No1 Tunnel	China (Shaanxi)	14.616 km (9.1 mi)	2028	Yan'an-Yulin-Ordos High Speed Railway
Hiyoshi Tunnel	Japan (Gifu)	14.532 km (9.0 mi)	2027	Chūō Shinkansen
Linjiashan Tunnel	China (Shaanxi)	14.530 km (9.029 mi)	2026	Xi'an-Ankang HSR
Yujialiang Tunnel	China (Shaanxi)	14.504 km (9.012 mi)	2028	Chongqing-Xi'an High Speed Railway
Nanjing South Station Tunnel	China (Jiangsu)	14.442 km (8.974 mi)	2026	Nanjing-Wuhu Railway
Chongming-Taicang Yangtse River Tunnel	China (Jiangsu-Shanghai)	14.250 km (8.855 mi)	2028	Shanghai–Nanjing–Hefei high-speed railway
Xierluo Tunnel	China (Sichuan)	14.240 km (8.8 mi)	2030	Sichuan-Tibet railway
East Dabashan Tunnel	China (Shaanxi - Chongqing)	14.172 km (8.806 mi)	2028	Chongqing-Xi'an High Speed Railway
Jinggangshan Tunnel	China (Jiangxi)	14.110 km (8.768 mi)	2028	Chongqing-Xiamen High Speed Railway
Wutaishan Tunnel	China (Shanxi)	14.086 km (8.753 mi)	2027	Xiong'an-Xinzhou High speed railway
Lulang Tunnel	China (Tibet)	14.052 km (8.732 mi)	2030	Sichuan-Tibet railway
Patalpani Rail Tunnel	India (Madhya Pradesh)	14.000 km (8.7 mi)	2025	Dr. Ambedkar Nagar (Mhow) - Omkareshwar Road

== See also ==
- List of long railway tunnels in China
- List of longest subway tunnel sections
- List of long tunnels by type
- List of longest tunnels
