= Lanhe =

Lanhe may refer to the following places in China:

- Lanhe, Guangzhou, Guangdong
- Lanhe, Heilongjiang, Lanxi County, Heilongjiang

== See also ==
- Lanzhou–Hezuo railway, or Lanhe railway
