= Lanzhou (Xining)–Guangzhou corridor =

High-speed railway in China

Lanzhou (Xining)–Guangzhou corridor 兰（西）广通道

Overview
- Status: Partly operational
- Locale: People's Republic of China
- Termini: Lanzhou Xining (branch); Guangzhou

Service
- Type: High-speed rail
- Operator(s): China Railway High-speed

Technical
- Line length: 2,106 km (1,309 mi) (Lanzhou - Guangzhou)
- Track gauge: 1,435 mm (4 ft 8 1/2 in) standard gauge
- Electrification: 50 Hz 25,000 V
- Operating speed: Chengdu-Guiyang 350 km/h (217 mph); Guiyang-Guangzhou 250 km/h (155 mph)

The Lanzhou (Xining)–Guangzhou corridor is a partially operational high-speed railway corridor connecting Lanzhou and Xining to Guangzhou. The passage's two branches that begin Lanzhou and Xining meet at Chengdu in Sichuan Province. From Chengdu, the corridor passes through Guiyang and Guilin before ending at Guangzhou.

The rail corridor was first announced in the 11th Five Year Plan by the Chinese government, as the "Chengdu–Guangzhou high-speed railway". In 2016, it was expanded to Lanzhou and Xining, as part of China's "Eight Vertical and Eight Horizontal" network.

== Sections ==
Section Railway line		Description	Designed speed (km/h)	Length (km)	Construction start date	Open date
Lanzhou–Tangga'ang Lanzhou–Hezuo railway (section)		Under construction mixed passenger and freight railway connecting Lanzhou and Tangga'ang.	200 (reserved for 250)	147	2019-09-25	2028 (expected)
Haidong–Qingbaijiang; Sichuan–Qinghai railway (section)	Haidong–Huangshengguan	Under construction mixed passenger and freight railway connecting Haidong and Huangshengguan, with connection to Xining via Lanxi HSR.	200 (reserved for 250)	499	2020-03-05	2028 (expected)
Haidong–Qingbaijiang; Sichuan–Qinghai railway (section)	Huangshengguan–Qingbaijiang	Mixed passenger and freight rail line connecting Huangshengguan and Qingbaijiang, with connections to Chengdu via Xicheng HSR.	200	276	2011-02-26	2023-11-28 (partially)
Chengdu–Guiyang high-speed railway	Chengdu–Leshan	HSR connecting Chengdu and Leshan.	300	131	2008-12-30	2014-12-20
Chengdu–Guiyang high-speed railway	Leshan–Yibin	HSR connecting Leshan and Yibin	250	141	2013-12-25	2019-06-15
Chengdu–Guiyang high-speed railway	Yibin–Guiyang	HSR connecting Yibin and Guiyang.	250	231	2013-12-25	2019-12-16
Guiyang–Guangzhou high-speed railway		PDL connecting Guiyang and Guangzhou.	300	857	2008-10-13	2014-12-26

=== Guiyang–Guangzhou high-speed railway ===
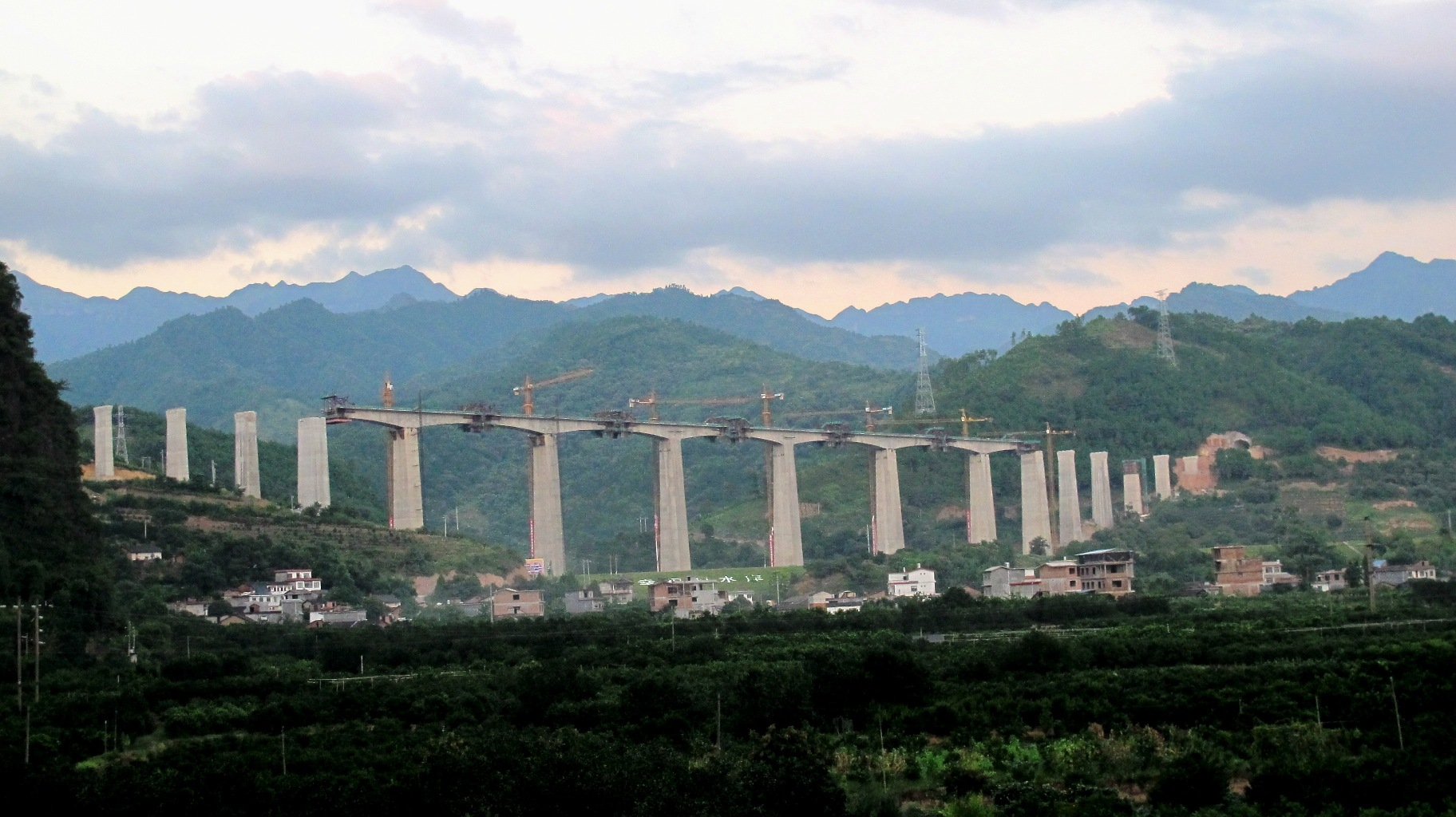
Construction progress on the Guiyang–Guangzhou high-speed railway bridge over the Xingping Reservoir in Xingping district of Yangshou county, Guilin, August 2013.

Guiyang–Guangzhou high-speed railway, is a high-speed rail (HSR) line in southern China between Guiyang and Guangzhou, the provincial capitals, respectively of Guizhou and Guangdong Province. The line, also known as the Guiguang HSR, is dedicated to high speed passenger rail service. The line is 856 km (532 mi) in length and can carry trains at speeds of up to 250 km/h (155 mph). The line was built from 2008 to 2014 and opened on 26 December 2014.

The line traverses rugged karst terrain in Guizhou and Guangxi and relies on extensive bridges and tunnels, which comprise 83% of the line's total length. The travel time by train between the two terminal cities was reduced from 20 hours to 4 hours. The line was built to accommodate train speeds of up to 250 km/h (155 mph), with the capacity to be remodelled to allow train speeds of up to 300 km/h (186 mph).

== See also ==
- High-speed rail in China
