= Chongqing–Changsha high-speed railway =

High-speed railway corridor in China

Overview
- Status: Operational
- Owner: China Railway
- Locale: China
- Termini: Chongqing; Changsha

Service
- Operators: CR Chengdu Group; CR Guangzhou Group

History
- Opened: 26 December 2022 (Changsha–Yiyang–Changde); 27 December 2022 (Changde–Qianjiang); 27 June 2025 (Chongqing East–Qianjiang)

Technical
- Line length: 762 km (473 mi)
- Track gauge: 1,435 mm (4 ft 8 1/2 in)
- Operating speed: 200 km/h (120 mph) to 350 km/h (220 mph) (design speed)

The Chongqing–Changsha high-speed railway was originally envisaged under China's "Eight Vertical and Eight Horizontal" high-speed rail network. Its three segments form part of the broader Xiamen–Chongqing corridor. The Changde–Yiyang–Changsha high-speed railway opened in September and December 2022. The Qianjiang–Changde railway opened in December 2022. The Chongqing East–Qianjiang segment of the Chongqing–Guizhou intercity railway opened in June 2025. The final section between Chongqing East and Chongqing station was completed on 24 July 2026, but is not yet open to traffic. Through-running trains now link Chongqing and Changsha in approximately 3 h 53 min at up to 350 km/h (220 mph).

There are also early plans for a more direct line between Qianjiang and Changsha via the Wuling Mountains.

== History ==
=== Planning ===
In 2014–10, the State Council approved a direct Chongqing–Changsha HSR (339 km (211 mi), 250 km/h (160 mph)) as part of the national "Eight Verticals and Eight Horizontals" network. There are also early plans for a more direct line between Chongqing East and Changsha via the Wuling Mountains.

=== Phased construction and opening ===
China Railway split the project into three interlinked contracts. The Changde–Yiyang–Changsha high-speed railway (157 km (98 mi) at 350 km/h (220 mph)) opened on 26 September 2022 and 26 December 2022. The Qianjiang–Changde railway (336 km (209 mi) at 200 km/h (120 mph))) opened on 27 December 2022. The Chongqing East–Qianjiang segment of the Chongqing–Guizhou intercity railway (269 km (167 mi) at 350 km/h (220 mph)) opened on 27 June 2025. The final section between Chongqing East and Chongqing station was completed on 24 July 2026, but is not yet open to traffic.

=== Current operation ===
These segments now form a continuous high-speed corridor, reducing journey times by over half.

== See also ==
- High-speed rail in China
- Xiamen–Chongqing corridor
