= West Qinling Tunnel =

Railway tunnel in Longnan, Gansu, China

- Interactive map of West Qinling Tunnel

Operation
- Opened: Dec 26, 2016

Technical
- Track length: 28,236 metres (92,638 ft)
- No. of tracks: two single
- Track gauge: 1,435 mm (4 ft 8 1/2 in)

The West Qinling Tunnel (Chinese: 西秦岭隧道; pinyin: Xīqínlǐng Suìdào) is in the middle of the Lanzhou–Chongqing railway (Chinese: 兰渝铁路), crossing the Qinling. It is a 28236 metre dual-bore railway tunnel in Wudu District, Longnan City, Gansu, north-west China. It is the second longest railway tunnel in China, slightly shorter than the New Guanjiao Tunnel. The construction started in August 2008, and went on for a duration of about five months and five years using both Tunnel boring machines (TBM) and drill and blast methods.
