= Guiyang–Nanning high-speed railway =

High-speed rail line in southwestern China

Guiyang–Nanning high-speed railway 贵南高速铁路

Overview
- Status: Operational (Guiyang–Libo section)
- Locale: Guizhou and Guangxi, China
- Termini: Guiyang North; Nanning East

Service
- Services: 1
- Operator(s): China Railway Chengdu Group & China Railway Nanning Group

History
- Opened: 8 August 2023

Technical
- Line length: 512 km (318 mi)
- Track gauge: 1,435 mm (4 ft 8 1/2 in)
- Operating speed: 350 km/h (217 mph)

The Guiyang–Nanning high-speed railway is a high-speed railway between Guiyang and Nanning in China. The railway is 512 km (318 mi) in length, of which 482 km (300 mi) is newly built. The line cuts travel time between the two cities from 10 hours to 3 hours on the fastest trains. It is part of the Baotou (Yinchuan)–Hainan corridor.

== History ==
Construction on the railway began in 2018. The initial section from Guiyang to Libo opened on 8 August 2023. On 31 August, the Libo-Nanning section of the Guinan High-speed Railway was officially opened to traffic, shortening the travel time from Guiyang to Nanning to less than three hours at the fastest.

== Route ==
Station Name	Chinese	Transfers / Connections	Location
Guiyang North	贵阳北	1	Guizhou
Guiyang	贵阳	1	Guizhou
Longli North	龙里北		Guizhou
Guidingxian	贵定县		Guizhou
Duyun East	都匀东		Guizhou
Dushan East	独山东		Guizhou
Libo	荔波		Guizhou
Huanjiang	环江		Guizhou
Hechi West	河池西		Guangxi
Yong'anzhen	永安镇		Guangxi
Du'an	都安		Guangxi
Mashanxian	马山县		Guangxi
Nanning North	南宁北		Guangxi
Nanning East	南宁东	Nanning Metro: 1	Guangxi
