= Nanjing–Wuhu railway =

Railway line in China

Nanjing−Wuhu railway or Ningwu railway (simplified Chinese: 宁芜铁路; traditional Chinese: 寧蕪鐵路; pinyin: níngwú tiělù), is a single-track railroad in eastern China between Nanjing in Jiangsu Province and Wuhu in Anhui Province. The line is 102 km (63 mi) long and was built between 1933 and 1935. Major towns along route include Nanjing, Ma'anshan, and Wuhu.

== Line Description ==
The line follows the southern bank of the Yangtze River from Nanjing to Wuhu. In 1968, the line was extended further west to Tongling, and now forms part of the Nanjing–Tongling railway. The railway passes through urban areas of Nanjing and is now being rerouted to run outside of the city. The old track is now being converted into Line 8 of the Nanjing Metro.

== See also ==
- List of railways in China
