= Sichuan–Qinghai railway =

Railway line in China

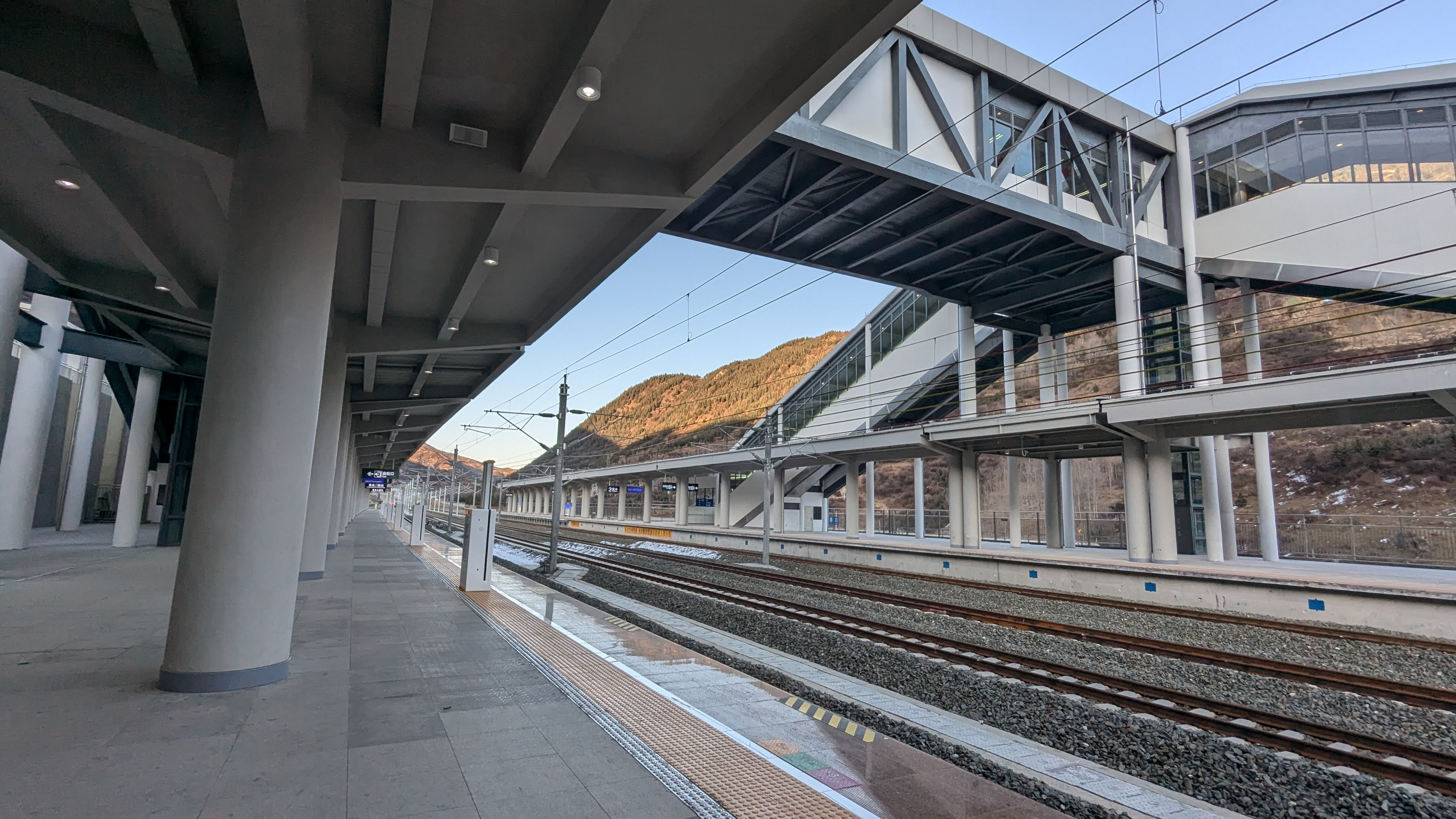
- Huanglongjiuzhai railway station, 2024

Overview
- Native name: 川青铁路
- Status: Partly operational (Chengdu East to Huangshengguan)
- Locale: China
- Termini: Chengdu East; Huangshengguan Future: Xining (main) & Lanzhou West (branch)

Service
- Operator(s): China Railway Chengdu Group & China Railway Lanzhou Group

Technical
- Line length: 730.549 km (454 mi)
- Track gauge: 1,435 mm (4 ft 8 1/2 in)
- Operating speed: 200 km/h (124 mph) (160 km/h (99 mph) between Lanzhou and Guangyuan)

Sichuan–Qinghai railway (Chinese: 川青铁路; pinyin: Chuān–Qīng tiělù), formerly known as Chengdu–Lanzhou railway during planning and construction, is a railway line under construction in China. The railway connects Chengdu, the provincial capital of Sichuan with Xining, capital of Qinghai, with a branch connecting Chengdu to Lanzhou, the capital of Gansu. It forms part of the Lanzhou (Xining)–Guangzhou corridor, part of China's "Eight Vertical and Eight Horizontal" network.

The line was planned and approved in the aftermath of the 2008 Sichuan earthquake, in order to improve future transportation in the affected area, through which the line will pass directly.

== Profile ==
The Chengdu–Lanzhou railway has a length of 730.549 kilometres (453.942 mi), of which 462 km (287 mi) is new trackage. It is being built as a double-track electrified railway, at the national railway line class I level. It will have an overall design speed of 200 km/h (124 mph); however, the Chengdu-Jiuzhaigou section will have a reduced speed of 174 km/h (108 mph) in some sections, due to the difficult and mountainous terrain. The total investment is expected to be 61.939 billion yuan.

After the completion of the railway, the distance between Lanzhou and Chengdu will be shortened from 1,172 km (728 mi) to 730 km (450 mi). Run time for train services will be reduced to about 5 hours.

== Route ==
Trains between Qinghai and Chengdu nowadays utilize the Lanzhou–Chongqing railway, switching over to the Xi'an–Chengdu high-speed railway at Guangyuan.

The new Chengdu–Lanzhou railway will head north from the urban area of Chengdu, through Qingbaijiang, Shifang, Mianzhu, Anzhou, and tunnelling through Longmen Mountain to Maoxian, tracing along the Minjiang River valley and on through Chuanzhusi to Jiuzhaigou County. Crossing into the territory of Gansu, across the Bailong River, it joins the Lanzhou-Chongqing HSR at Hadapu, using that railway line to the terminus at Lanzhou West station.

In the early design plan, the railway will pass through Minshan Mountain after Chuanzhusi station, enter Gansu, cross the Bailong River, and connect with the Lanzhou-Chongqing railway at Hadapu station, and share the same line with the Lanzhou-Chongqing railway to the end of Lanzhou East station. In subsequent adjustments, the route north of Huangshengguan station was changed to an integrated design with Chengdu-Xining railway and no longer connected to the Lanzhou-Chongqing railway. The new line will extend from Huangshengguan station to the northwest and enter Gannan via Zoige. It will connect with the Lanzhou-Hezuo railway in Hezuo City. It will then enter Lanzhou via Gannan and Linxia.

A branch will extend from Hezuo to Xining, providing a more direct route between Xining and Chengdu.

== Stations ==
=== Main ===
Station Name	Chinese	China Railway & Metro transfers/connections
Xining	西宁	
Haidong West	海东西	
Hualong	化隆	
Jianzha	尖扎	
Tongren	同仁	
Ganjia	甘加	
Xiahe	夏河	
Hezuo	合作	Branch line
Luqu	碌曲	
Langmusi	郎木寺	
Abahuahu	阿坝花湖	
Axi	阿西	
Ruoergai	若尔盖	
Banyou	班佑	
Hongyuan	红原	
Huangshengguan	黄胜关	Opened on 30 August 2024.
Huanglongjiuzhai	黄龙九寨	Opened on 30 August 2024.
Songpan	松潘	Opened on 30 August 2024.
Zhenjiangguan	镇江关	
Diexi	叠溪	
Shidaguan	石大关	
Maoxian	茂县	
Gaochuan	高川	
Anzhou	安州	
Mianzhu South	绵竹南	
Shifang West	什邡西	
Sanxingdui	三星堆	
Qingbaijiang	青白江	
Chengdu East	成都东	2 7

=== Branch ===
Station Name	Chinese	China Railway & Metro transfers/connections
Lanzhou West	兰州西	
Xigucheng	西固城	
Liujiaxia	刘家峡	
Linxia	临夏	
Shuangcheng	双城	
Hezuo	合作	Main line

== History ==
Chengdu–Lanzhou railway planning map

Construction on the railway started on 26 February 2011 in Songpan County, Sichuan.

The section from Chengdu East to Zhenjiangguan opened in November 2023. The three-station extension from Zhenjiangguan to Huangshengguan opened in 2024. The entire railway line is to be opened in 2026.

=== Accident ===
At around 3:10 a.m. local time on August 22, 2025, a steel cable broke during construction of the Jianzha Yellow River Bridge of the Sichuan–Qinghai railway, located at the border of Jianzha County, Huangnan, and Hualong, Haidong city of Qinghai province, causing the bridge to partially collapse.

Twelve people were killed and another four were reported missing.
