= Xi'an–Yan'an high-speed railway =

Railway line in Shaanxi, China

Xi'an–Yan'an high-speed railway 西延高速铁路

Overview
- Status: Operational
- Locale: Shaanxi Province, China
- Termini: Xi'an East; Yan'an

Service
- Type: High-speed railway
- Operator: China Railway Xi'an Group

Technical
- Line length: 304 km (189 mi)
- Track gauge: 1,435 mm (4 ft 8 1/2 in)
- Electrification: 25 kV/50 Hz AC overhead catenary
- Operating speed: 350 km/h (220 mph)

The Xi'an–Yan'an high-speed railway or Xiyan HSR (Chinese: 西延高速铁路; pinyin: Xīyán Gāosù Tiělù) is a high-speed railway line in Shaanxi, China. It has a length of 299.8 kilometres (186.3 mi) and a maximum speed of 350 kilometres per hour (220 mph). It reduced the journey time between Yan'an and Xi'an from 2.5 hours to a little more than an hour.

The railway opened on 26 December 2025. It parallels the existing Xi'an–Yan'an railway, but takes a more direct route.

== History ==
Construction on a 16-kilometre (9.9 mi) long tunnel south of Yan'an began on 9 January 2020.

Construction of the 208-kilometre (129 mi) Tongchuan to Yan'an section started construction in April 2021. The route of the remaining 93.4 kilometres (58.0 mi) from Xi'an to Tongchuan was confirmed in August 2022. Construction of Xi'an to Tongchuan section started in November 2022.

The railway opened on 26 December 2025.

== Stations ==
| Station Name | Chinese |
|---|---|
| Xi'an East | 西安东 |
| Gangwuqu East | 港务区东 |
| Gaoling | 高陵 |
| Fuping South | 富平南 |
| Tongchuan | 铜川 |
| Tongchuan North | 铜川北 |
| Yijun | 宜君 |
| Huangling West | 黄陵西 |
| Luochuan | 洛川 |
| Fuxian North | 富县北 |
| Ganquan North | 甘泉北 |
| Yan'an | 延安 |
