= Lüliangshan Tunnel =

Lüliangshan Tunnel 吕梁山隧道 Lǚliáng Shān Suìdào
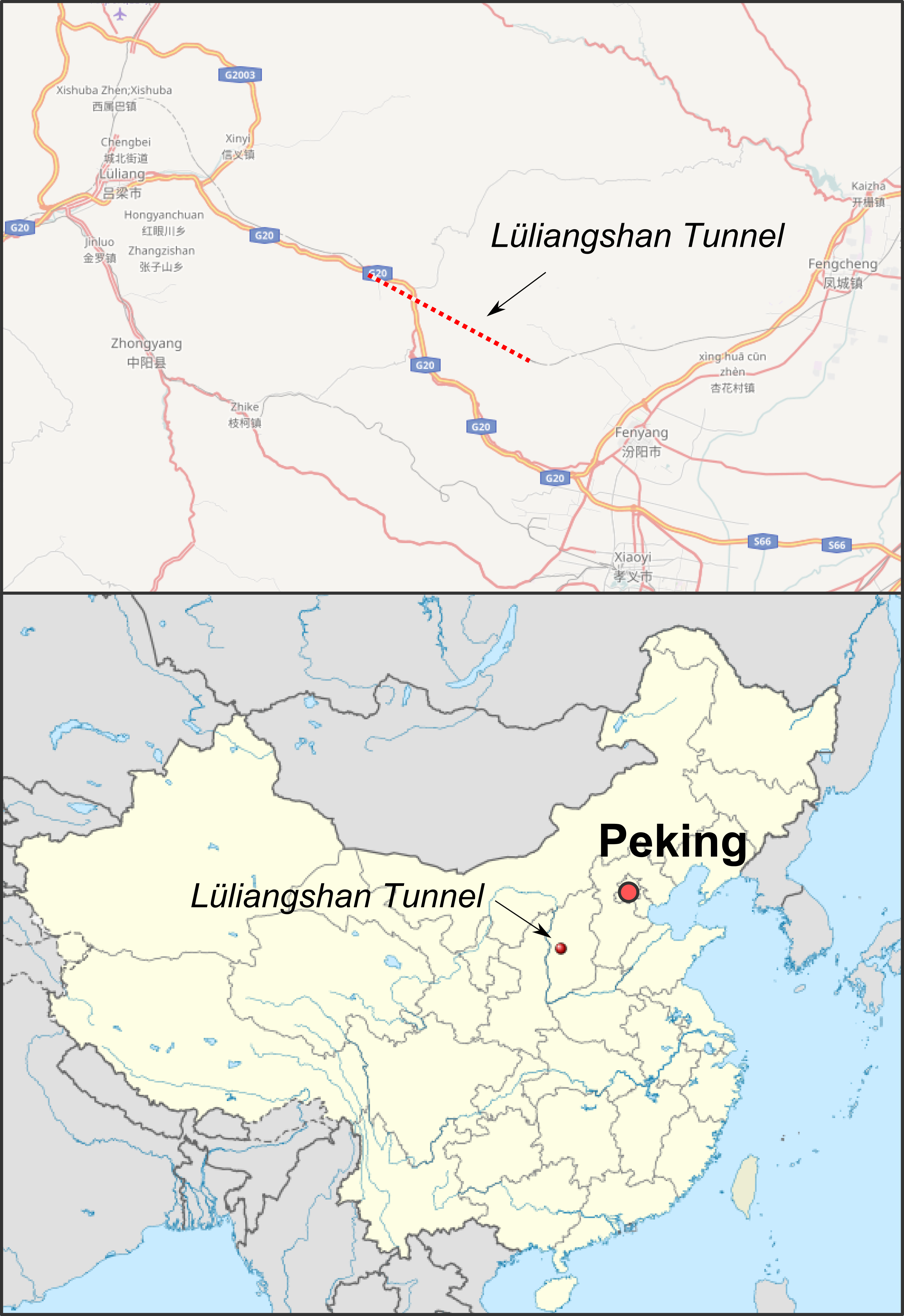
- Location of the Lüliangshan Tunnel
- Interactive map of Lüliangshan Tunnel 吕梁山隧道; Lǚliáng Shān Suìdào

Overview
- Coordinates: Lishi District: 37°26′7″N 111°26′34″E; Fenyang: 37.3465362°N 111.6473565°E
- Status: Active
- Crosses: Lüliang Mountains
- Start: Lishi District, Lüliang, Shanxi
- End: Fenyang, Lüliang, Shanxi

Operation
- Opened: January 2011
- Operator: China Railway
- Character: rail passenger and freight

Technical
- Line length: 20.8 km (12.9 mi)
- No. of tracks: 2 single track tunnels
- Track gauge: 1,435 mm (4 ft 8 1/2 in) standard gauge
- Electrified: 25 kV AC OHLE

Lüliangshan Tunnel (Chinese: 吕梁山隧道; pinyin: Lǚliáng Shān Suìdào; lit. 'Lüliang Mountain Tunnel') is built to allow the Taiyuan–Zhongwei–Yinchuan railway to cross the Lüliang Mountains.

The tunnel is located between Wucheng (a town in Lüliang City) and Fenyang in Shanxi province. It is a dual bores, double track rail tunnel. The left track is 20,785 metres long and the right one is 20,738 metres long. The tunnel construction was started in March 2006, and broken through in October 2009. It was opened to traffic in January 2011.

== Location ==
- Western portal: 37°26′7″N 111°26′34″E
