= New Guanjiao Tunnel =

Railway tunnel in Qinghai (Peopleʼs Republic of China)

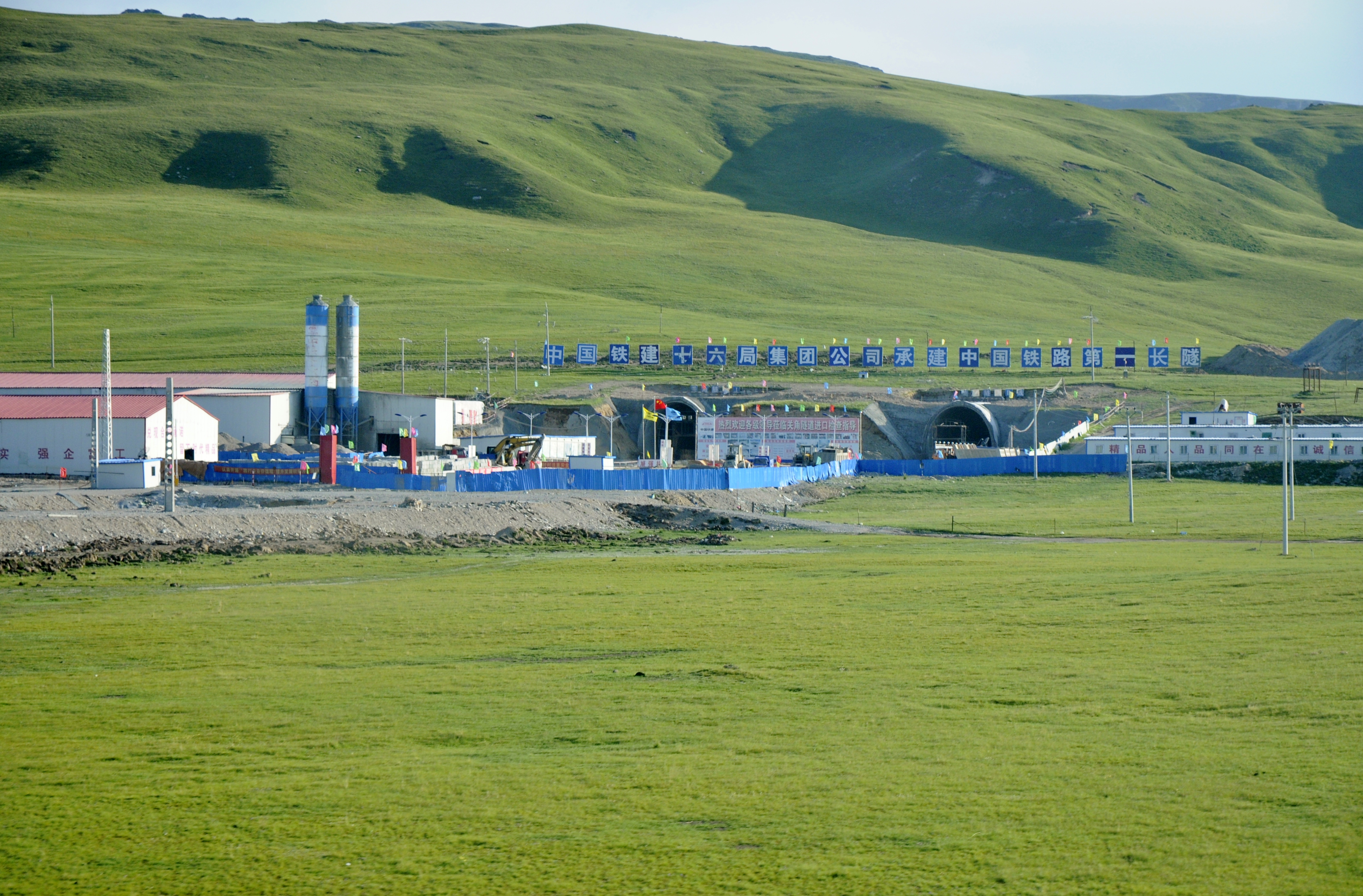
- A portal of New Guanjiao Tunnel during construction in 2011
- Interactive map of New Guanjiao Tunnel

Overview
- Line: Qinghai–Tibet Railway
- Location: Guanjiao Mountain
- Coordinates: 37°8′40″N 99°4′59″E
- Start: 37°10′58″N 99°10′38″E
- End: 37°0′33″N 98°52′50″E

Operation
- Work began: 2007
- Opened: 28 December 2014
- Traffic: train

Technical
- Length: 32,645 metres (107,103 ft)
- No. of tracks: two single
- Track gauge: 1,435 mm (4 ft 8 1/2 in)
- Electrified: electrified
- Operating speed: 160 km/h
- Max elevation: 3,381 metres (11,093 ft)
- Min elevation: 3,324 metres (10,906 ft)

New Guanjiao Tunnel (Chinese: 新关角隧道; pinyin: Xīn Guānjiǎo Suìdào) is a tunnel on the 2nd line of Qinghai–Tibet Railway in Guanjiao Mountain, Qinghai province. It is dual-bored, double-track rail tunnel. The total length of the tunnel is 32.645 km (20.285 mi), which made it at the time of completion the longest railway tunnel in China and fourth-longest in the world.

China Railway First Survey and Design Institute is responsible for the design. The New Guanjiao Tunnel was designed for two parallel single-track tunnels with speeds of up to 160 kilometres per hour (99 mph). The total construction duration was projected to be 5 years. The tunnel was bored in difficult geological conditions and high altitude, exceeding 3,300 metres (10,800 ft) above sea level. The construction started in 2007 and was completed in April 2014. The tunnel was opened on 28 December 2014.

The tunnel's northeastern portal (37.1834°N 99.1778°E) is in Tianjun County, the southwestern portal (37.0094°N 98.8805°E) is in Ulan County.
