= Lanzhou–Hezuo railway =

Railway line in China

Lanhe railway 兰合铁路

Overview
- Status: Under construction
- Locale: Gansu, China

Service
- Type: Heavy rail
- Operator: Lanzhou Railway Bureau

Technical
- Line length: 184 km (114 mi)
- Number of tracks: 2
- Track gauge: 1,435 mm (4 ft 8 1/2 in)
- Minimum radius: Normal: 3,500 m (11,500 ft), difficult: 3,000 m (9,800 ft)
- Electrification: 25 kV 50 Hz AC (Overhead line)
- Operating speed: 200 km/h (120 mph) (250 km/h (160 mph) reserved for level sections)
- Signalling: ABS
- Maximum incline: 1.8%

The Lanzhou–Hezuo railway or Lanhe railway (Chinese: 兰州至合作铁路 or 兰合铁路) is a railway line under construction that will connect Lanzhou to Linxia and Hezuo by rail. The line is being extended from Hezuo to Chengdu as part of the Sichuan–Qinghai railway. The railway line will be the first railway to be constructed in Linxia and Gannan. It is a branch of the Lanzhou (Xining)–Guangzhou corridor, part of China's "Eight Vertical and Eight Horizontal" network.

The length of the line will be 187.798 kilometres (116.692 mi) of which 147.455 kilometres (91.624 mi) is newly constructed.

Although an existing railway connects Lanzhou to Yongjing, the new Lanhe railway will follow a different route.

== History ==
The initial feasibility study was presented in 2009. In 2011, the Ministry of Railways requested a technical study for the railway, this was completed in 2013. Construction started in December 2014 and was originally planned to be completed in 2019. However, the designs were adjusted and construction was suspended. In 2015, it was announced that the design speed was increased from 120km/h to 200km/h, and a new feasibility study was to be completed by 2016.

In 2019, it was announced that the construction would resume by the end of the year. Construction is by the China Railway Bureau 20th Construction Group at a total investment of CNY 22.987 billion.

== Stations ==
Station Name	Chinese
Xigucheng	西固城
Liujiaxia	刘家峡
Linxia	临夏
Shuangcheng	双城
Tangga'ang	唐尕昂
Hezuo	合作
