= Tianshui–Longnan railway =

Planned railway line in China

- Map of the Tianshui–Longnan railway (in green) within the Lanzhou-Chengdu railway corridor

Overview
- Native name: 天陇铁路
- Status: Under construction
- Locale: Gansu
- Termini: Tianshui; Longnan West
- Stations: 15

Service
- Type: Heavy rail

Technical
- Line length: 215 km (134 mi)
- Track gauge: 1,435 mm (4 ft 8 1/2 in) standard gauge
- Electrification: 50 Hz 25,000 V overhead line
- Operating speed: 160 km/h (99 mph)

The Tianshui–Longnan railway is a planned railway in China. The combined passenger and freight line will be 215 kilometres (134 mi) long and has a design speed of 160 kilometres per hour (99 mph). The project is in the design phase as of 2021.

The line will take a north-south route, connecting with the Longhai railway and the Tianshui–Pingliang railway in the north, and the Chongqing–Lanzhou railway in the south.

== History ==
Construction began in November 2020 and is expected to take five and a half years with a cost of 24.323 billion yuan. However in 2021 it was reported that the project was in the preliminary design phase and would commence construction again by the end of that year.

Construction started in July 2022 and is planned to be completed by the end of 2027. On June 13, 2025, the Xujiaping tunnel, the first extra-long tunnel of the Tianlong Railway, was successfully completed, establishing a robust basis for the further efficient advancement of construction.

== Stations ==
Yangjianian (existing station on Tianshui–Pingliang Railway), Panjizhai, Maijishan, Niangniangba, Liziyuan, Mayan, Jiangluo, Shuiquan, Chengxian, Xixia, Taishi, Pingluo (Kang County), Foya, Anhua, Majie, Liangshui, Longnan West railway station (existing station on Chongqing–Lanzhou railway).
