= Xi'an–Shiyan high-speed railway =

High-speed rail line in China

Overview
- Native name: 西十高铁
- Status: Operating
- Termini: Shiyan East; Xi'an East
- Stations: 7

Service
- Operator: China Railway Xi'an Group

History
- Opened: 30 June 2026; 28 days ago

Technical
- Line length: 255.7 km (159 mi)
- Track gauge: 1,435 mm (4 ft 8 1/2 in)
- Operating speed: 350 km/h (217 mph)

The Xi'an–Shiyan high-speed railway (Chinese: 西十高铁) is a high-speed railway in China.

== History ==
Construction began on 15 December 2021. The entire line was opened on 30 June 2026 at 9:16 am.

== Route ==
The line is 255.7 kilometres (158.9 mi) long, has a maximum speed of 350 kilometres per hour (220 mph), and has seven stations. As of the opening, this line and the Wuhan–Shiyan high-speed railway form a complete 350 kilometres per hour (220 mph) line between Wuhan and Xi'an.

== Stations ==
Station Name	Chinese	Metro transfers/connections
Shiyan East	十堰东	
Yunxi	郧西	
Manchuanguan	漫川关	
Shanyang	山阳	
Shangluo West	商洛西	
Lantian	蓝田	
Xi'an East	西安东	
