= Chongqing–Kunming high-speed railway =

Railway line in China

Chongqing–Kunming high-speed railway 渝昆高速铁路

Overview
- Status: Under construction
- Termini: Chongqing West; Kunming South

Service
- Operator(s): China Railway High-speed

Technical
- Line length: 699 km (434 mi)
- Number of tracks: 2
- Track gauge: 1,435 mm (4 ft 8 1/2 in)
- Minimum radius: Normal: 7,000 m (4.3 mi); difficult: 5,500 m (3.4 mi)
- Electrification: 25 kV 50 Hz AC (Overhead line)
- Operating speed: 350 km/h (217 mph)
- Maximum incline: Normal: 2%; difficult: 3%

The Chongqing–Kunming high-speed railway (Chinese: 渝昆高速铁路) is a high-speed railway line currently under construction in China. The line, which runs from Chongqing West to Kunming South, will be part of the Beijing–Kunming corridor. The line will be 699 kilometres (434 mi) long and have a maximum speed of 350 kilometres per hour (220 mph).

Journey times from Kunming to Chengdu and Chongqing are expected to be around two hours.

Part of the line is the Yiliang tunnel, on the border of Yiliang County and Yanjin County, which would become the longest high-speed railway tunnel built for to a 350 km/h (217 mph) standard.

== History ==
Construction on the Sichuan section began on 29 September 2019. Construction on the Yunnan section began on 20 December 2019.
