= Xi'an–Chengdu high-speed railway =

Railway line in western China

Xi'an-Chengdu high-speed railway 西成客运专线

Overview
- Status: In operation
- Locale: Shaanxi and Sichuan
- Termini: Xi'an North; Chengdu East

Service
- Services: 1
- Operator(s): CR Xi'an Group & CR Chengdu Group

History
- Opened: 6 December 2017

Technical
- Line length: 510 km (317 mi)
- Track gauge: 1,435 mm (4 ft 8 1/2 in)
- Electrification: 25 kV/50 Hz AC overhead catenary
- Operating speed: 250 km/h (160 mph)

Xicheng Passenger Dedicated Line
- Simplified Chinese: 西成客运专线
- Traditional Chinese: 西成客運專線
Transcriptions
Standard Mandarin
- Hanyu Pinyin: Xīchéng Kèyùn Zhuānxiàn

Xi'an–Chengdu high-speed railway or Xi'an-Chengdu Passenger Dedicated Line, is a dual-track, electrified, high-speed rail line in Western China between Xi'an and Chengdu, respectively the provincial capitals of Shaanxi and Sichuan. This line, which commenced operations on 6 December 2017, runs 510 km (320 mi) through Shaanxi and Sichuan provinces and accommodates trains traveling at speeds up to 250 km/h (160 mph). Travel time between the two provincial capitals was reduced from 16 to less than three hours.

The project was approved by the State Development and Planning Commission in October 2010. Construction of the Sichuan section of the railway started on November 10, 2010, and of the Shaanxi section, on October 27, 2012. The line traverses the rugged Qin and Daba Mountains and connects the Guanzhong Plains with the Sichuan Basin.

The line is part of the Beijing–Kunming corridor.

== Route ==
The high-speed rail line connects Xian, in the Wei River Valley, Hanzhong, in the Han River Valley, and Guangyuan, Jiangyou and Chengdu in the Sichuan Basin. In the Qin Mountains, it has 127 km (79 mi) of tunnels, including six over 10,000 m (6.2 mi) in length. The railway passes under ecologically sensitive areas including the Taibaishan and Hanzhong Crested Ibis National Nature Reserves, which are home to the endangered giant panda, golden snub-nosed monkey, takin and crested ibis.

Over much of its length, the Xi'an–Chengdu Passenger Dedicated Line largely parallels existing railways: the Yangpingguan–Ankang railway in southwestern Shaanxi (between Hanzhong and the Yangpingguan junction), and the Baoji–Chengdu railway in Sichuan (from Yangpingguan to Chengdu). However, the section from Xi'an to Hanzhong, crossing in tunnels under the Qin Mountains, follows an entirely new direct route.

High speed rail reforms meant direct Chengdu-Lanzhou and Chongqing-Xi'an services would use a combination of Xi'an–Chengdu high-speed railway and Chongqing–Lanzhou railway from where they met at Guangyuan. This would negate the need to build a separate direct Chongqing-Xi'an or Chengdu-Lanzhou lines. However, with the announcement of the expanded 8+8 high speed rail grid, the two originally planned lines were reinstated in the masterplan.

The Chengdu-Xi'an HSR have to cross the Qin Mountains; to achieve that, trains must climb continuously at 2.5% inclination (2.5 meters up per 100 meters run) for 47 kilometers. Since most HSR trains with 250 km/h maximum speed are not equipped with sufficient redundant power to maintain max speed climbing, trains scheduled to run between Chengdu and Xi'an using 250 km/h max speed equipments have to reserve extra time for the tunnel. However, for trains that continue to Beijing via Xi'an-Zhengzhou High Speed Rail and Guangzhou-Beijing High Speed Rail, an equipment capable of 350 km/h operations must be utilized to reach regular speed on the Zhengzhou-Beijing part. With redundant power equipped for 350 km/h operations, they lose less speed going up the tunnel, thus spending less time; this has reportedly caused these trains to have to reduce speed to maintain proper separation.

== History ==
- November 1, 2010: The Xi'an–Chengdu high-speed railway project received approval from the State Development and Planning Commission.
