= Tianshui Tram =

Light rail system in Tianshui, Gansu, China

- Network map (2019)

Overview
- Native name: 天水有轨电车
- Area served: Qinzhou and Maiji districts, Tianshui, Gansu, China
- Locale: Tianshui, Gansu, China
- Transit type: Light rail
- Number of lines: 2
- Number of stations: 26

Operation
- Began operation: May 1, 2020; 6 years ago
- Operators: Tianshui Signal & Communication Trams Co., Ltd (天水通号有轨电车有限责任公司)
- Number of vehicles: 17

Technical
- System length: 30.1 km (19 mi)
- Top speed: 70 km/h (43 mph)

Tianshui Tram is a light rail system consisting of two lines in Qinzhou District and Maiji District, Tianshui, Gansu, China.

== History ==
Construction started on July 15, 2018 and testing started in March 2019 on a 600 meter long test section. The total investment for the project is estimated at 2.446 billion Yuan. The first phase started commercial operation on May 1, 2020.

In 2024 it was reported that the single completed tram line operates at a huge loss, having a CNY 16 million annual passenger revenue while having a CNY 40 million annual operating cost. The tram project's financial burden on the city's finances have led to construction of phase 2 of the first line to be delayed.

On June 18, 2025, most of the second phase opened for passengers: Wulipu to Jingkun Xijun Sanzhong and Yangpodong to Tianshui Jichang, while the airport to Yingchuan Hekou terminus section is still under construction.

== Background ==
Public transport in Tianshui was almost solely serviced by bus routes before. The Tianshui Tram is the first rail transport in Tianshui for local transit. Due to the spatial layout of Tianshui in an east-west river valley, all planned lines will roughly follow the river. Tianshui government chose China Railway Signal & Communication (CRSC) to develop the tram line under a design-build-operate contract. The system is the first revenue service of CRSC's new tram subsidiary, and will also function as a demonstration of their technology.

== Lines ==
Originally there was 3 lines being planned for the Tianshui network with a long-term perspective of an addition of two more lines.

Line 1 was consisting of a main line from Jiekou Town to Economic Development Zone, and a branch line from Yangpodong to Tianshui Railway Station. Among them, the main line (Jiekou Town to Economic Development Zone) was planned to be the main rail transit line in Tianshui City that crosses the east-west main urban area, connecting the main urban areas of Qinzhou and Maiji districts, while taking into account the enlarging towns and economic development zones around the main urban area.

Line 2 was planned to be a north-south line connecting Qinzhou District and Sanyangchuan. It should have mainly undertaken passenger transportation tasks in the central urban areas of Tianshui City and Sanyangchuan New Area, while taking into account the role of public transportation in Sanyangchuan New Town.

Line 3 was another north-south line connecting Maiji District and Maijishan Scenic Area with an additional section from Yingchuanhekou to Maijishan Grottoes on Line 3.

=== Line 1 ===
Phase 1

The first phase of Line 1 is running from Wulipu station in Qinzhou District to Tianshui Railway Station in Maiji District. The tram tracks follow the Jie River, and further along, the Wei River closely for the entire length and are built on a man-made raised riverbank. Phase 1 of Line 1 has a length of 12.9 kilometres (8.0 mi) and serving 12 stations with two more stations not having been opened yet. It was constructed by China Railway Signal & Communication Guizhou Construction Company and has no at-grade road intersections. The commercial operation commenced on May 1, 2020.

Phase 2

Phase 2 was originally planned to start construction in October 2019, this was later revised to November 2020 with a construction period of three years and a budget of CNY6.547 billion (US$990 million). This second phase consists of a west extension of Line 1 and it was built simultaneously with the originally named branch line of Line 1, later rebranded as Line 2, the southeast extension branch line. In total the new sections will measure 21.6 km (13.4 mi) and having 19 stops, creating a light rail network of 35.0 km (21.7 mi).

The west extension from Wulipu station onwards with 11.9 km (7.4 mi) and 10 stations deviates from the riverbank, passing through the commercial centre of Qinzhou District, terminating at Jingkun Xijun Sanzhong (Jingkun Xijun ＆ Tianshui No.3 Middle School). It was opened on 18 June 2025, except Tianshui Jichang to Fenlukou section is delayed, and finally opened on 26 September 2025.

Station list

Service routes		Station name en	Station name zh	Location	Connections
●		Tianshui Train Station	天水火车站	Maiji	TSJ
●		Maiji Bus Station	麦积公交总站	Maiji	
●		Chengjixinjiayuan	成纪新家园	Maiji	
●		Shiyizhong	市一中	Maiji	
●		Pujingjiu Road	铺经九路	Maiji	
|	●	Fenlukou	分路口	Maiji	
|	●	Huaniu	花牛	Maiji	
|	●	Tianshui Jichang	天水机场	Maiji	THQ
|	|	Gaotiexincheng (Note: reserved station, no indicate of opening time)	高铁新城	Maiji	
|	●	Tianshui Nanzhan	天水南站	Maiji	TIJ
|	●	Baiyacun	白崖村		
|	●	Dongershilipu	东二十里铺		
●	●	Yangpodong	阳坡东		
	●	Jihejingguangongyuan	藉河景观公园		
	●	Tianxiudaqiao	天秀大桥		
	●	Chengjixincheng	成纪新城	Qinzhou	
	●	Xianjia Road	县家路	Qinzhou	
	●	Yanhecun	闫河村	Qinzhou	
	●	Wulipu	五里铺	Qinzhou	
	●	Gongye Bowuguan	工业博物馆	Qinzhou	
	●	Zhuge Junlei	诸葛军垒	Qinzhou	
	●	Nongfa Hang	农发行	Qinzhou	
	●	Lantian Guangchang	兰天广场	Qinzhou	
	●	Fuximiao	伏羲庙	Qinzhou	
	●	Tianshui Shida	天水师大	Qinzhou	
	●	Chiyulu	赤峪路	Qinzhou	
	●	Xishili	西十里	Qinzhou	
	●	Jidian Xueyuan	机电学院	Qinzhou	
	●	Jingkun Xijun Sanzhong	景坤西郡三中	Qinzhou	

Service

Trams run every 10 minutes during peak-hours and every 15 minutes during regular hours.

=== Line 2 ===
Line 2 was newly planned to split from Line 1 halfway at Yangpodong station, immediately crossing the Jie River, and serving Tianshui South railway station, then continuing through the southeast part of the built-up area in Maiji District, on the south bank of the Wei River and Jie River. The line was originally planned to cover a total of 16.1 kilometres (10.0 mi) and serve 17 stations.

As construction of Line 2 started with phase 2 of the Line 1, the plans had already been cut and the southeast extension branch will now run from Yangpodong to Yingchuan Hekou, covering 10.2 km (6.3 mi) and serving 10 stations. It has been opened for 5.3 km (3.3 mi) with additional four stations until the airport together with the west extension on 18 June 2025. These extensions have triggered a reorganisation of operations, with the section of original line from Yangpodong to Tianshui Rail Station now operated as Line 2, with the main of the system becoming Line 1 from Tianshui South HSR station to Jingkunxijun Tianshui No.3 Middle School.

=== Line 3 ===
Line 3 is now planned to be 7.25 kilometres (4.50 mi) long and service 10 stations on the south bank of the Jie River in Qinzhou District.

== Rolling stock ==
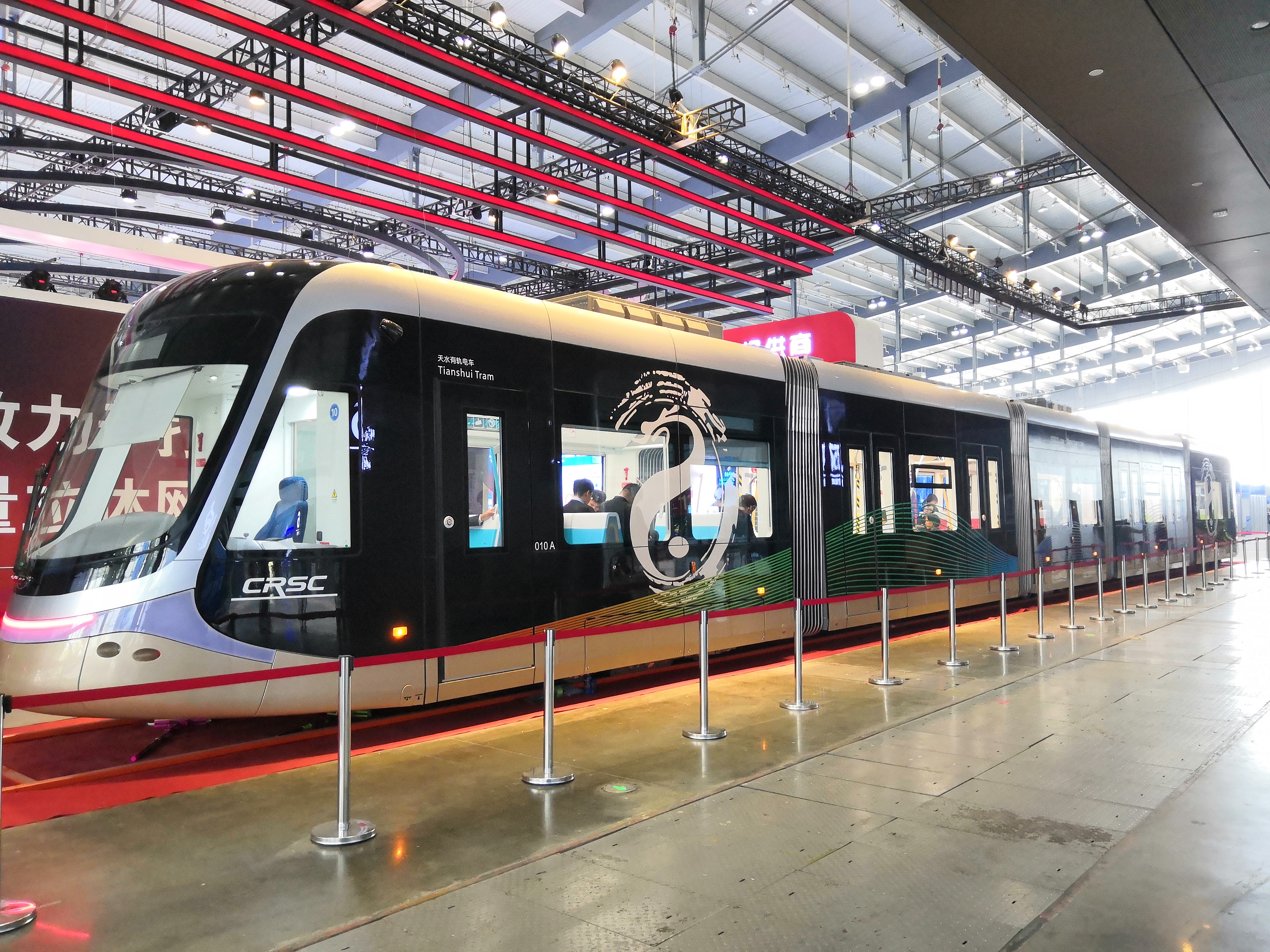
Rolling stock at Changsha International Convention & Exhibition Centre

The rolling stock on Line 1 is constructed by China Railway Signal & Communication Vehicle Company in Changsha. The trams use supercapacitors combined with batteries, instead of overhead lines, and are charged only at stops. The trams are fully low floor, have a maximum speed of 70 kilometres per hour (43 mph) and have 58 seats, and a total carrying capacity of 370 persons. Each tramset consists of five short wheelbase carriages. It is the first implementation of CRSC's new low-floor trams.

The trams are nicknamed "Boyue" (伯约), the courtesy name of Jiang Wei, a military general from the historical Three Kingdoms period who grew up in Tianshui.
