= Tianshui railway station =

Railway station in Tianshui City, Gansu, China

Tianshui 天水
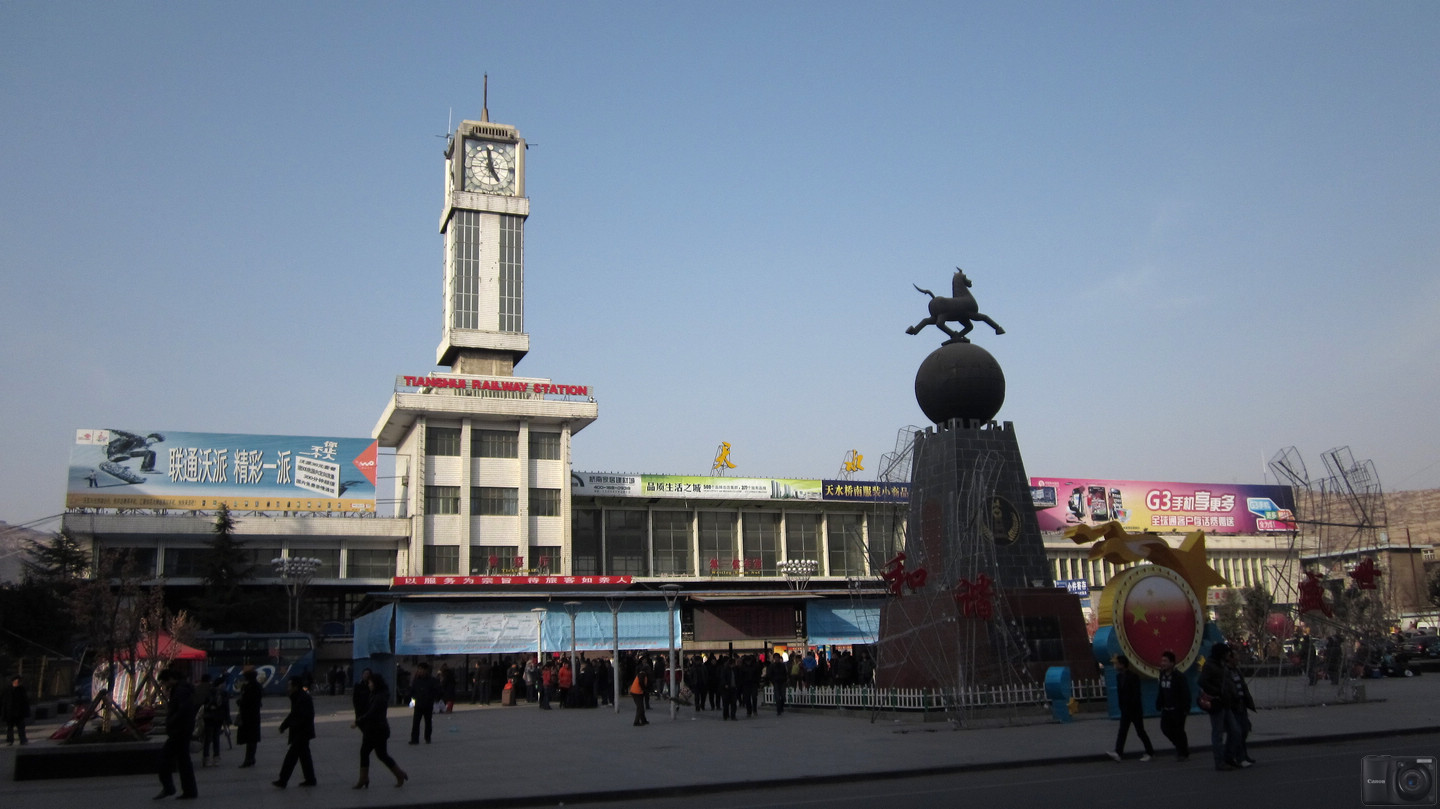
- The station building (before renovation)

General information
- Location: East 1 Longchang Road; Maiji District, Tianshui, Gansu; China
- Coordinates: 34°34′00″N 105°53′40″E
- Operator: CR Lanzhou
- Lines: Longhai railway; Tianshui–Pingliang railway
- Platforms: 5 (1 side platform and 2 island platforms)
- Tracks: 10
- Connections: Bus terminal

Other information
- Station code: 39701 (TMIS code); TSJ (telegraph code); TSH (Pinyin code)
- Classification: Class 1 station (一等站)

History
- Opened: 1948

Services
Preceding station	China Railway	Following station
Baoji towards Lianyungang East	Longhai railway	Nanhechuan towards Lanzhou
Location
- Location within Gansu Location within China

Tianshui railway station (Chinese: 天水站) is a station on Longhai railway in Tianshui, Gansu.

The station is served by the Tianshui Tram, which opened in 2020. Since 2017, Tianshui has also been served by Tianshui South railway station on the Xi'an–Baoji High-Speed Railway.

== History ==
The station was established in 1948, and was the westernmost and last station built by the government of ROC in mainland China.

The current station building was completed in 1989 and renovated in 2017. The renovation project was finished on 31 January 2018.

== Station layout ==
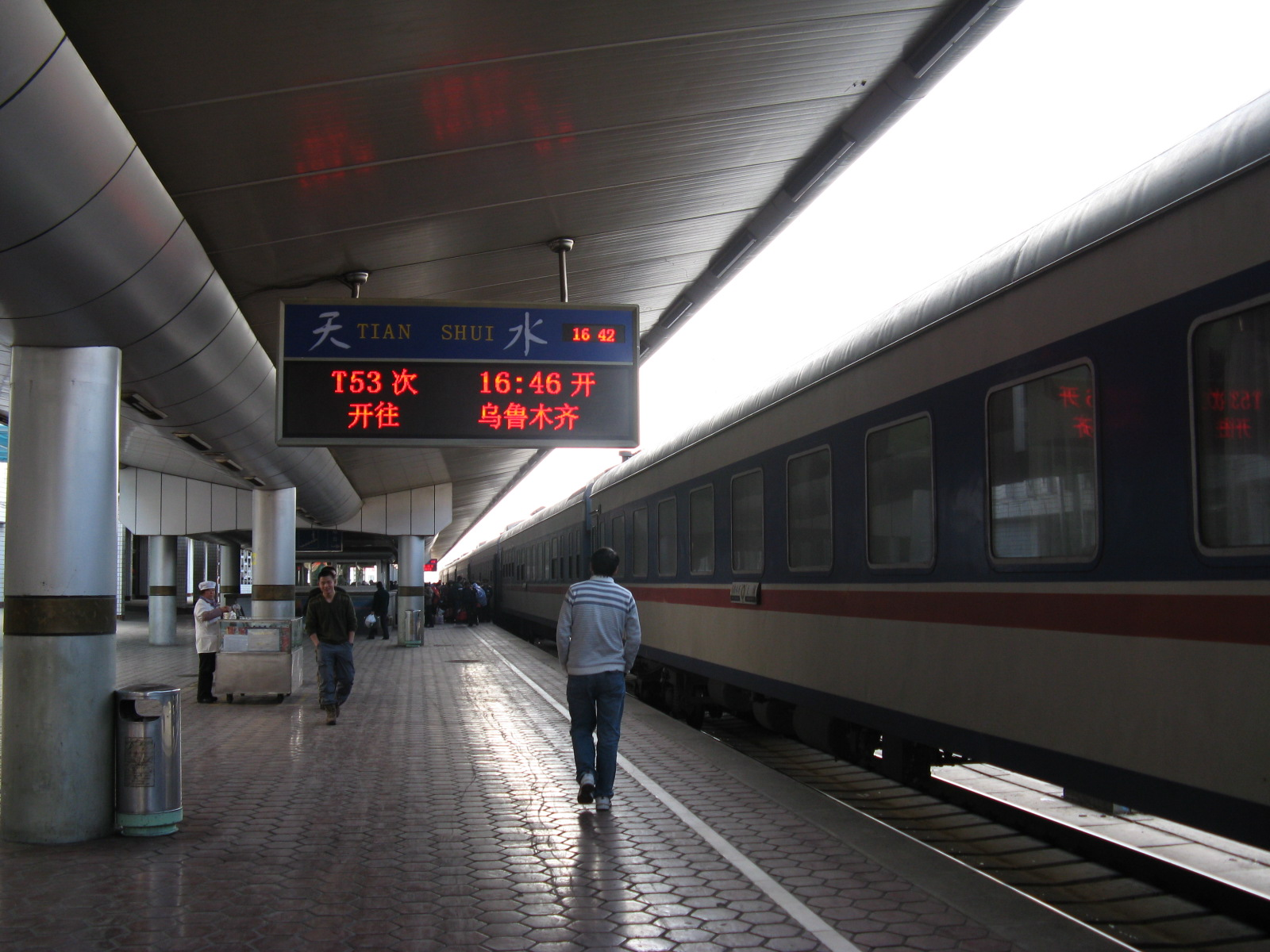
Platform 1 of the station

The station has two parts: the passenger station in the south and the classification yard in the north. The passenger station has one side platform and two island platforms for a total of five platform sides. The station building, located to the south of the platforms, covers an area of 11,000 square kilometres (4,200 sq mi) with three waiting rooms.

Rail yard		Classification yard
Platforms	Track	Longhai railway towards Lianyungang East (Baoji) →
Platforms	Platform 3
Platforms	Track	Longhai railway towards Lianyungang East (Baoji) →
Platforms	Through track	Longhai railway towards Lianyungang East (non-stop) →
Platforms	Through track	← Longhai railway towards Lanzhou (non-stop)
Platforms	Platform 2
Platforms	Track	← Longhai railway towards Lanzhou (Nanhechuan)
Platforms	Trackg	← Longhai railway towards Lanzhou (Nanhechuan)
Platforms	Platform 1
Station building		Entrances and exits, ticket offices, waiting rooms
