= CRSC =

CRSC may refer to:

- Center for Science and Culture, formerly known as the Center for the Renewal of Science and Culture (CRSC)
- China Railway Signal & Communication, a train control system maker
