= THQ (disambiguation) =

THQ was an American developer and publisher of video games.

THQ may also refer to:

- THQ Studio Australia, a former video game development subsidiary for THQ
- THQ Nordic, an Austrian developer and publisher of video games
- THQ, the IATA code for Tianshui Maijishan Airport, China
