= BJY =

BJY may refer to:

- BJY, the IATA code for Batajnica Air Base, Belgrade, Serbia
- BJY, the Pinyin code for Beijing Chaoyang railway station, Beijing, China
- BJY, the Telegraph code for Baoji railway station, Shaanxi, China
