= Maiji =

Maiji may refer to:

- Maiji District, district in Tianshui, Gansu, China
- Maiji Shan, mountain in Gansu, China, the cite of Maijishan Grottoes
