= Tianshui–Pingliang railway =

Railway line in Gansu, China

Overview
- Native name: 天平铁路
- Locale: Gansu, China
- Connecting lines: Longhai Railway Baozhong Railway Tianlong Railway
- Stations: 9

History
- Commenced: 2008
- Opened: 2015

Technical
- Line length: 123 km (76 mi)
- Number of tracks: 1
- Minimum radius: 800 m (2,600 ft)
- Electrification: overhead line
- Operating speed: 120 km/h (75 mph)

The Tianshui–Pingliang railway is a railway line in Gansu, connecting Tianshui and Pingliang. The line is jointly funded by the Ministry of Railways, Gansu Province, and China Huaneng Group Gansu Energy Development Co., Ltd. The line is primarily used for coal transportation, while also carrying local passenger trains and cargo other than coal.

The line has a maximum slope of 13‰ for the direction of loaded trains and 18‰ for the direction of unloaded trains. The minimum curve radius is 1200 meters, 800 meters in the mountainous section. The total length of bridges and tunnels is 78 kilometers, accounting for 68.14% of the line length. Among them, the Guanshan Tunnel passing through the Guanshan section of the Liupan Mountain is 15,600 meters long, and the Liupanshan Tunnel is 16,390 meters long, which is the longest single-track and non-main line railway tunnel in China. There are a total of nine stations along the line.

The design speed is 120km/h, it is expected that the freight volume transported will be 16 million tons in the near future and 18.2 million tons in the long term.

== History ==
The railway line was a key project of the Eleventh five-year plan in Gansu province.

The project investment amount was 5.4 billion yuan, and the construction period was estimated to be 42 months. Surveying and design was performed by the China Railway First Survey and Design Institute. The construction was officially started on 4 December 2008 and the line was completed and opened to traffic on 30 December 2015.
