= Weinan, Tianshui =

Weinan 渭南镇
- Town
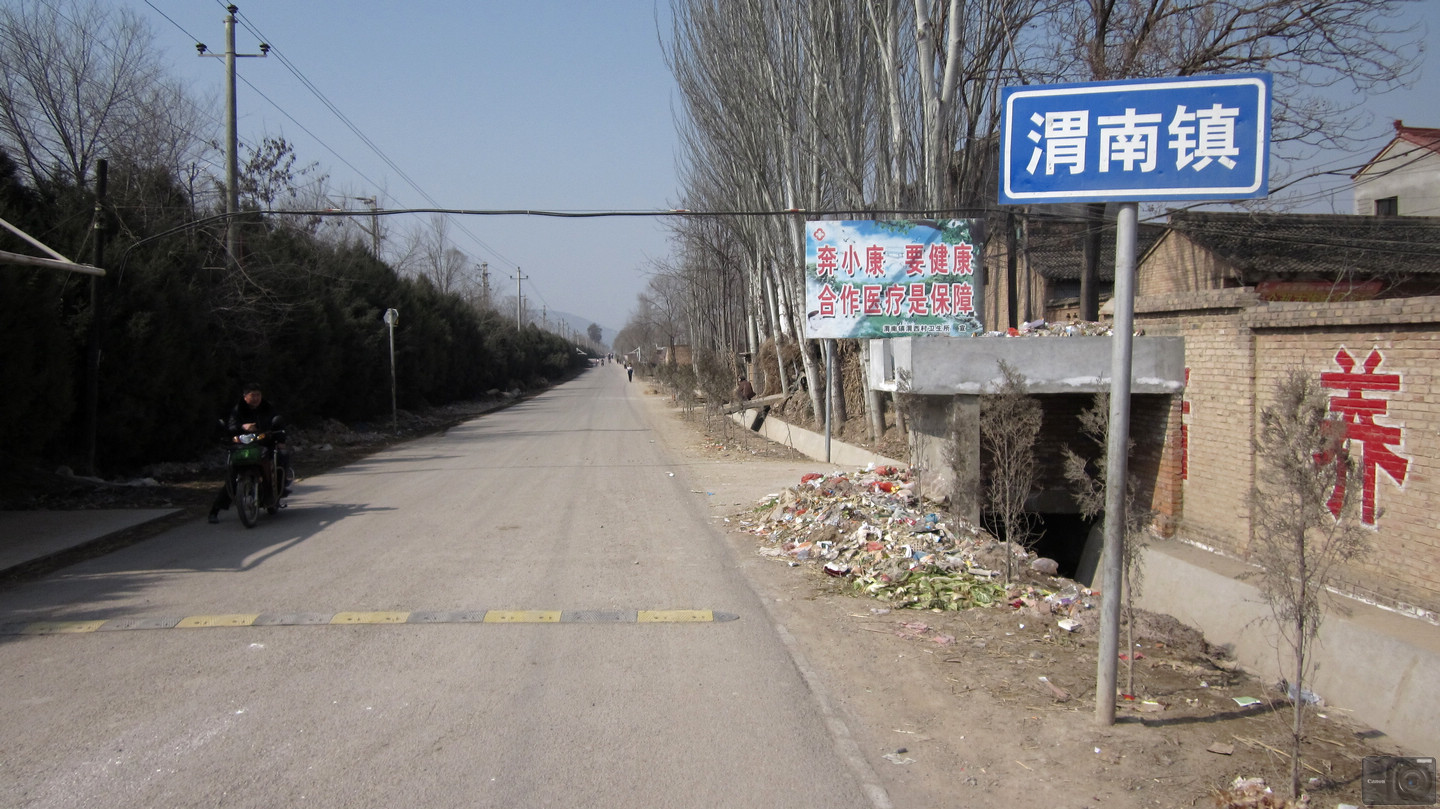
- Interactive map of Weinan

Area
  - Total: 73.42 km^{2} (28.35 sq mi)
- Elevation: 1,083 m (3,553 ft)

Population
  - Total: 43,105
- Postal code: 741029

Weinan is a town of Maiji District, Tianshui, Gansu. It is located on the south bank of the Wei River around 20 km from Tianshui's urban area. The local residents descend from Shanxi's Locust tree of Hongtong immigrants.

Weinan administers 1 residential community and 47 villages. In 2008 the population was 43,105 residents.

The main attraction in Weinan town is Guatai Mountain, at 1363 m, it rises 170 m above the surrounding landscape on the bank of the Wei river. On top there is a Fuxi temple.
