= Shifo, Gansu =

Shifo 石佛镇
- Town
- Interactive map of Shifo
- Coordinates: 34.702°N 105.704°E
- Country: China
- Province: Gansu
- Prefecture-level city: Tianshui
- District: Maiji

Shifo is a town of Maiji District, Tianshui, Gansu, China. Its history can be traced back to at least 937.

It is named after a stone buddha sculpture near the town (Shifo translates to 'Stone Buddha'). The town is known in the region for its birdcage crafting and, in particular Huangzhuang village, for its noodle production.
