= Pingliang railway station =

Railway station in Pingliang, China

Pingliang 平凉站

General information
- Location: Kongtong District, Pingliang, Gansu; China
- Coordinates: 35.5510°N 106.7035°E
- Line: Baoji–Zhongwei railway

History
- Opened: 1995
Location

Pingliang railway station is the main railway station serving Pingliang, Gansu, China. It was built in 1995 and is administered by the China Railway Lanzhou Group. The station is served by the Baoji–Zhongwei railway, located 203 km from the Baoji terminus and 308 km from the Zhongwei terminus.
