= Tianshui Association =

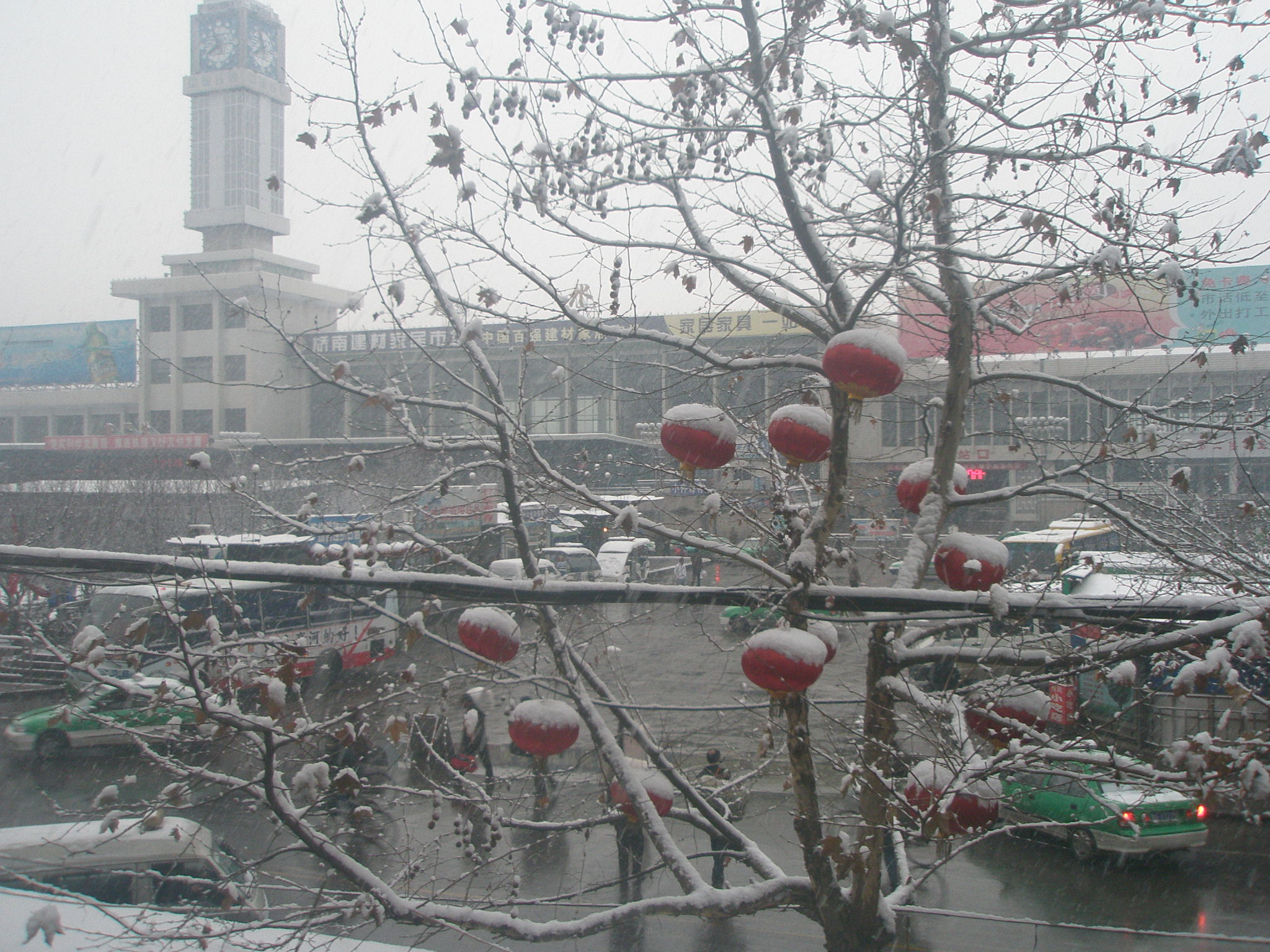
The present-day Tianshui Railway Station (2009)

Tianshui Association (Japanese: 天水会, pronounced in Japanese "Tensui Kai" and in Chinese "Tianshui Hui") is a mutual assistance association in Japan of the 300 Japanese railway engineers who worked under forced labor for the construction of the Tianshui-Lanzhou Railway, Gansu Province, China.

After the end of the Second Sino-Japanese War, around 930 Japanese former South Manchuria Railway engineers and their family members were not repatriated to Japan and instead sent to Tianshui, Gansu Province by the Republic of China government, to aide construction of the Tianshui-Lanzhou section (354 km) of the Longhai Railway. The railway was completed under the PRC government in 1952 and those Japanese workers, who were repatriated to Japan in 1953, formed the Tianshui Association, a mutual assistance association. The association retains friendly ties with Tianshui and in 1999 donated 1000 cherry blossom trees, which were used to build the Sino-Japanese friendship park in Tianshui. While many of the first-generation workers have reached old age, the association remains active with descendants of the railway engineers.
