= Baoji–Zhongwei railway =

Railway line in China

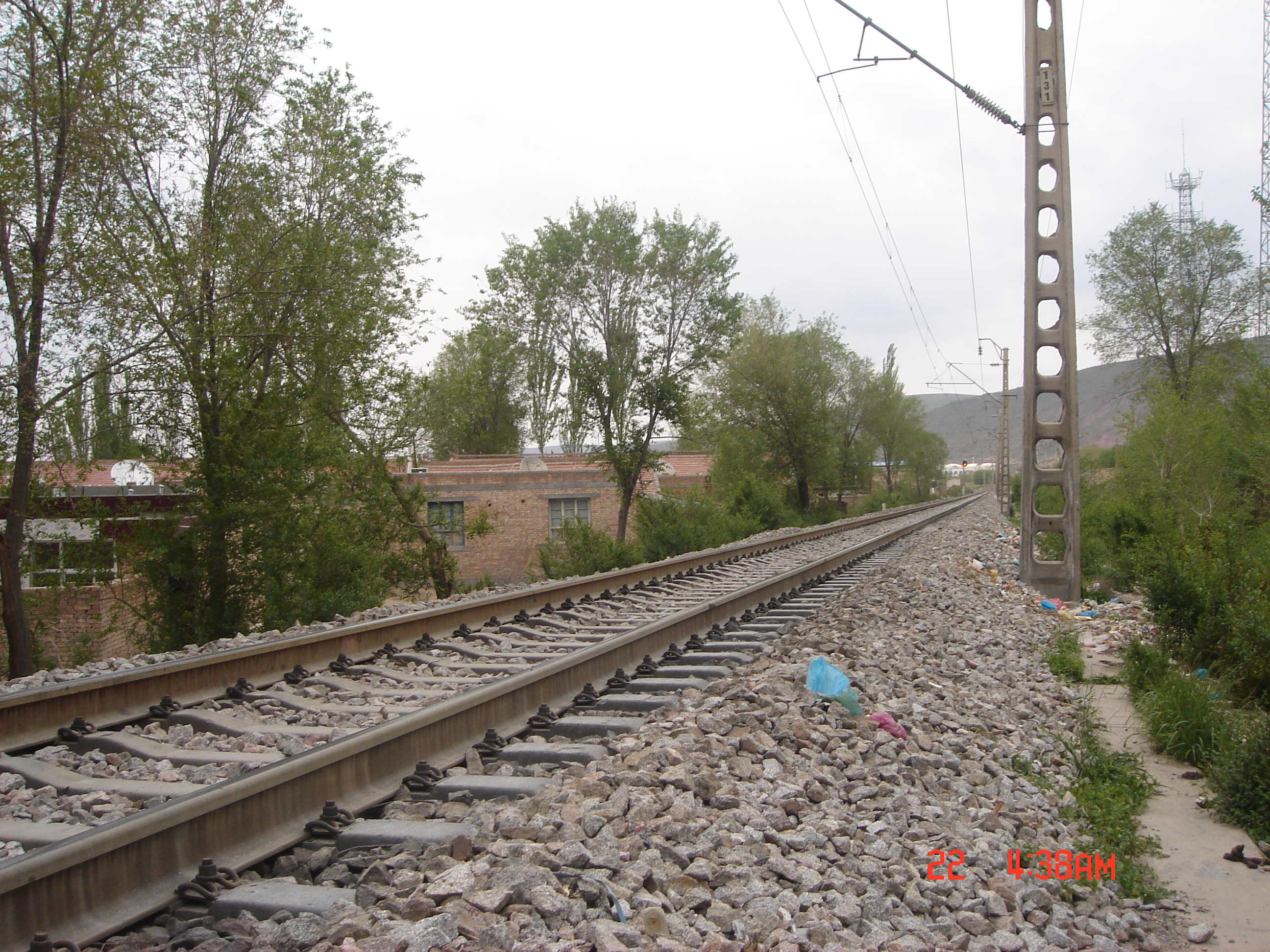
- Near Guyuan

Overview
- Native name: 宝中铁路

History
- Opened: June 8, 1995

Technical
- Line length: 498.19 km (309.56 mi)

The Baoji–Zhongwei railway is a railway line in northwest China: it starts in Baoji in Shaanxi, passes through Pingliang in Gansu and finally ends in Zhenluobao (镇罗堡) in Zhongwei in Ningxia, with a total length of 498.19 kilometres. Construction on the railway started in 1990 and track laying was completed on 10 July 1994. It was electrified and opened in the following year on 8 June 1995. The railway is under the jurisdiction of the Xi'an Railway Bureau in Shaanxi and the Lanzhou Railway Bureau in Gansu and Ningxia. The line is single-track and electrified. It is a key line connecting Shaanxi, Gansu and Ningxia.

There are plans to make the line double-tracked and increase the maximum speed to 160 km/h.

== Route ==
The line starts at Guozhen station in Qianwei town near Baoji and ends at Yinshuiqiao station just west of Zhongwei, traversing 14 counties and cities in Shaanxi, Gansu and Ningxia.

=== Main stations ===
- Baoji railway station
- Qianyang
- Qixian
- Huating
- Pingliang
- Guyuan
- Tongxin
- Zhongwei

== See also ==
- Yinchuan–Xi'an high-speed railway, an alternative route between Shaanxi and Ningxia through Gansu
- Xi'an–Pingliang railway
