= Qinzhou, Tianshui =

Qinzhou 秦州区 Tsinchow
- District
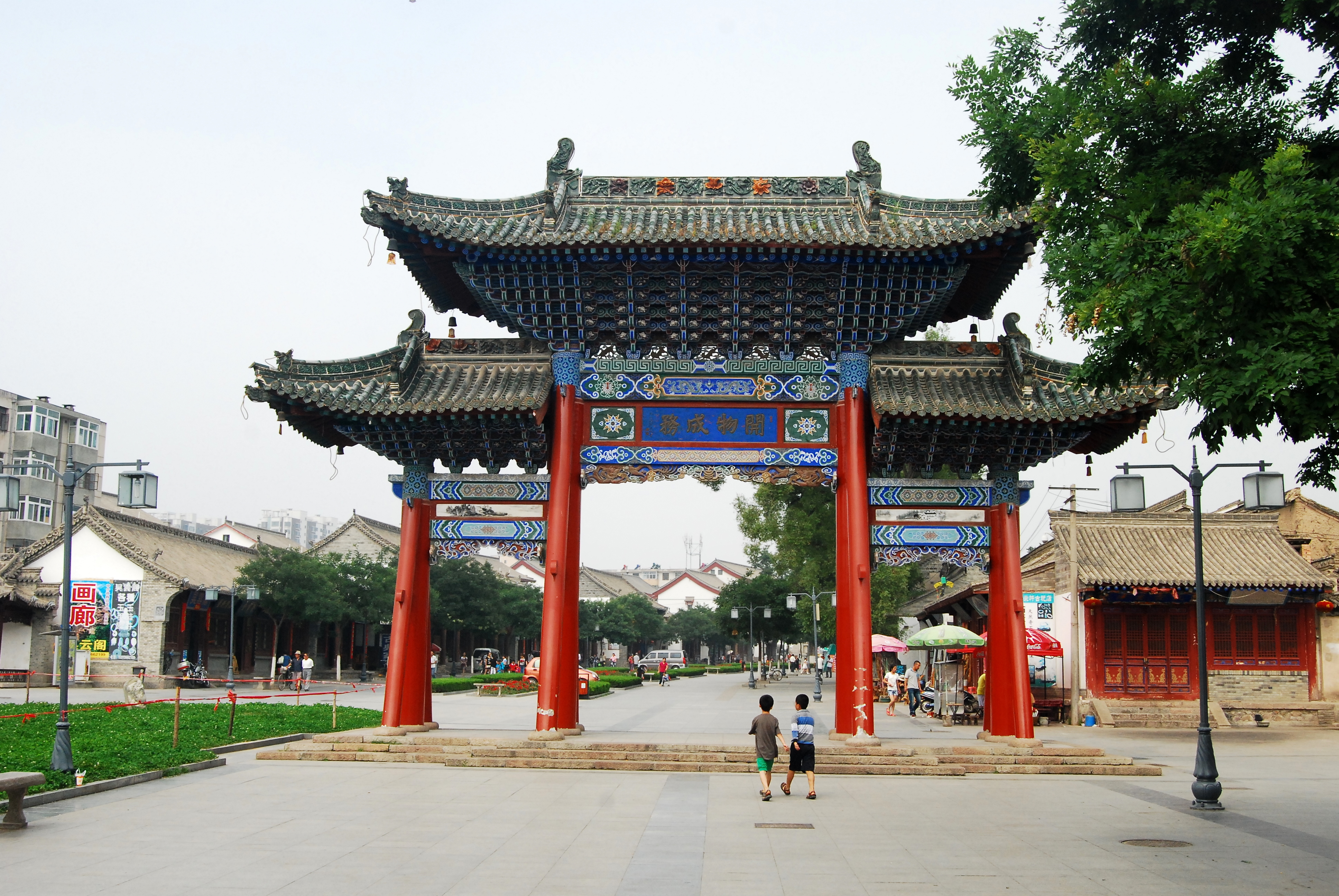
- Fuyi Pedestrian Street

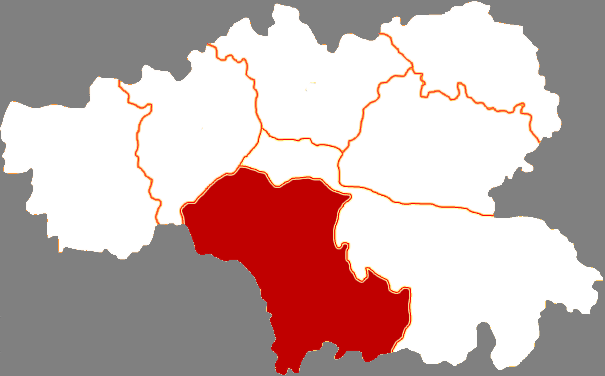
- Qinzhou in Tianshui

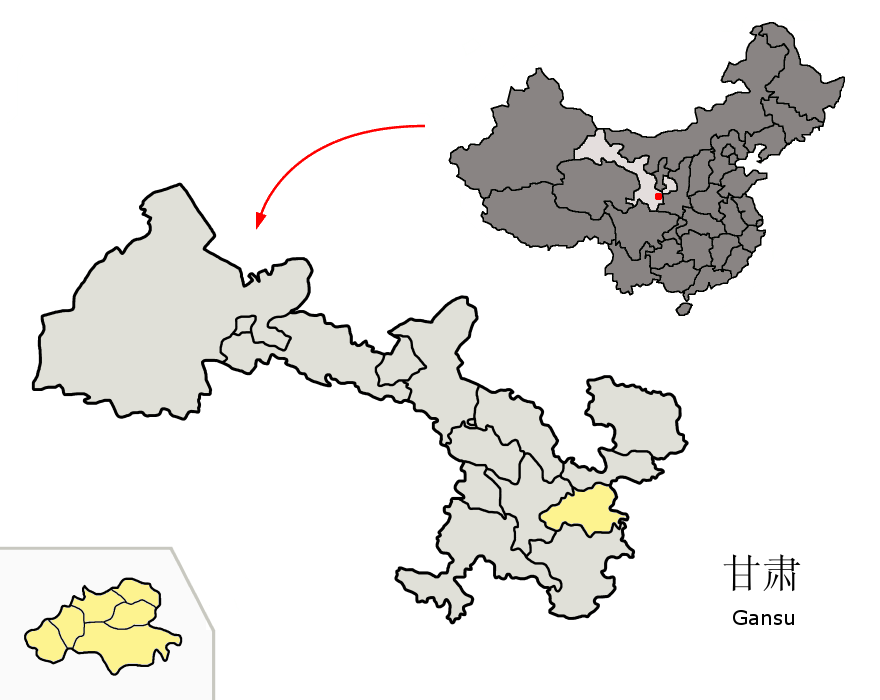
- Tianshui in Gansu

- Location in Gansu
- Coordinates: 34°34′51″N 105°43′27″E
- Country: China
- Province: Gansu
- Prefecture-level city: Tianshui
- District seat: Dacheng Subdistrict

Area
  - Total: 2,442 km^{2} (943 sq mi)

Population (2020)
  - Total: 656,689
  - Density: 268.9/km^{2} (696.5/sq mi)
- Time zone: UTC+8 (China Standard)
- Postal code: 741000
- Area code: 0938
- Website: www.qinzhouqu.gov.cn

Qinzhou (Chinese: 秦州; pinyin: Qínzhōu), formerly romanized as Tsinchow, is a district and the seat of the city of Tianshui, Gansu province, China. It is named for its former position as the seat of the medieval Chinese province of Qinzhou. Before 2005 it was called Qincheng District. It is the political, economic and cultural center of Tianshui.

Qinzhou has an area of 2,442 km^{2} (943 sq mi) and a population of 656,689 as of 2021.

== Administrative divisions ==
Qinzhou District is divided to 7 subdistricts and 16 towns.

Subdistricts

- Dacheng Subdistrict (大城街道)
- Qilitun Subdistrict (七里墩街道)
- Dongguan Subdistrict (东关街道)
- Zhongcheng Subdistrict (中城街道)
- Xiguan Subdistrict (西关街道)
- Shimaping Subdistrict (石马坪街道)
- Tianshuijun Subdistrict (天水郡街道)

Towns

- Yuquan (玉泉镇)
- Taijing (太京镇)
- Jikou (藉口镇)
- Zaojiao (皂郊镇)
- Wangchuan (汪川镇)
- Mudan (牡丹镇)
- Guanzi (关子镇)
- Pingnan (平南镇)
- Tianshui (天水镇)
- Niangniangba (娘娘坝镇)
- Zhongliang (中梁镇)
- Yangjiasi (杨家寺镇)
- Qishou (齐寿镇)
- Damen (大门镇)
- Qinling (秦岭镇)
- Huaqi (华岐镇)

== See also ==
- List of administrative divisions of Gansu
