= Tianshui Maijishan Airport =

Tianshui Maijishan Airport 天水麦积山机场
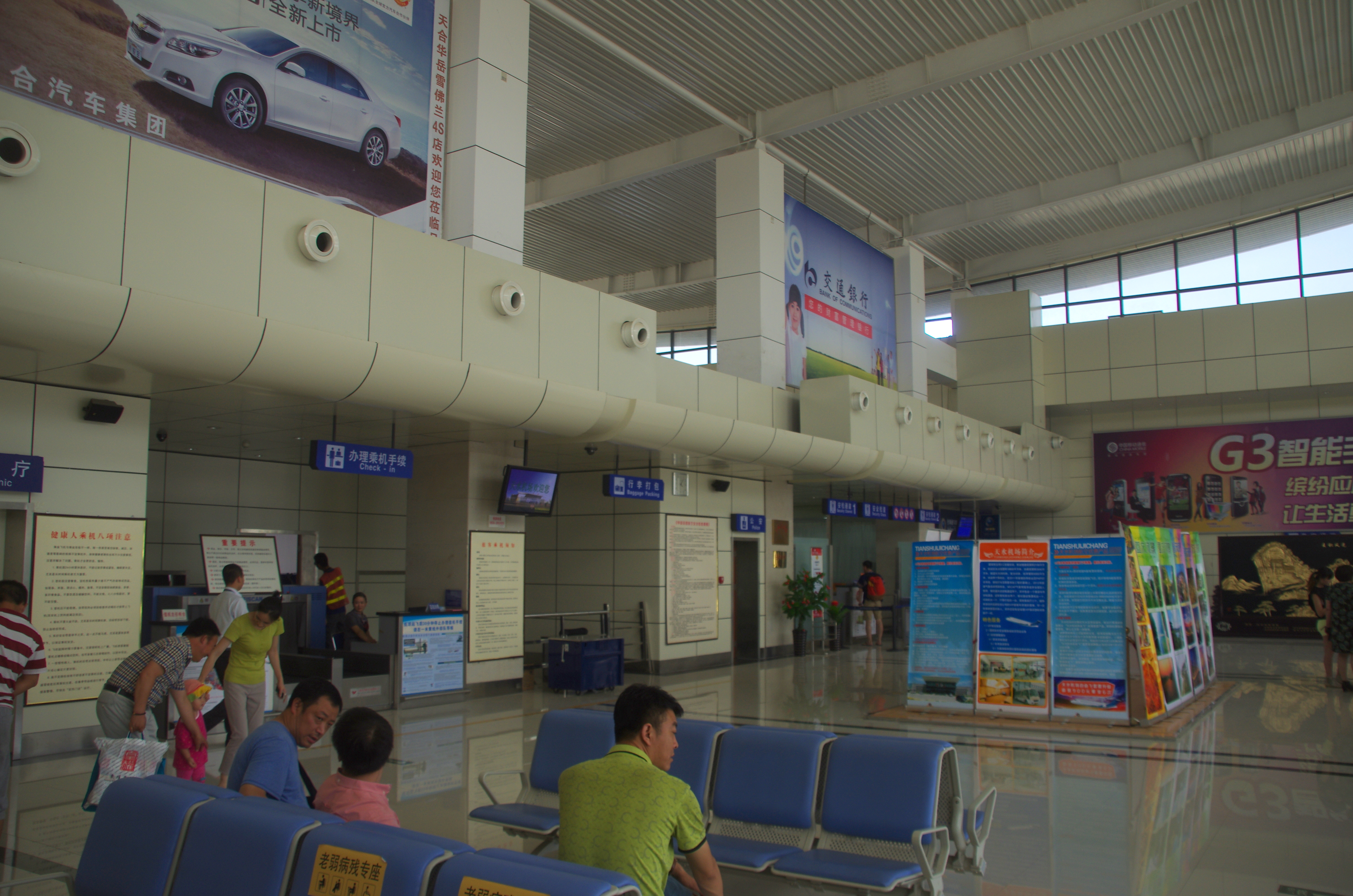
- IATA: THQ; ICAO: ZLTS

Summary
- Airport type: Military/Public
- Serves: Tianshui, Gansu
- Location: Maiji District, Tianshui, Gansu
- Coordinates: 34°33′30″N 105°51′40″E

Map
- Location of airport in Gansu

Runways
Direction	Length		Surface
Direction	m	ft	Surface
10/28	2,800	9,186

Statistics (2021)
- Passengers: 170,351
- Aircraft movements: 3,102
- Cargo (metric tons): 241

Tianshui Maijishan Airport
- Simplified Chinese: 天水麦积山机场
- Traditional Chinese: 天水麥積山機場
Transcriptions
Standard Mandarin
- Hanyu Pinyin: Tiānshuǐ Màijīshān Jīchǎng

Tianshui Maijishan Airport (IATA: THQ, ICAO: ZLTS), or Tianshui Air Base, is a dual-use military and civil airport serving the city of Tianshui in Gansu Province, China. It is located in Maiji District of Tianshui, 50 kilometres (31 miles) from the tourist destination of Maijishan after which it is named.

Originally a military airfield, it was converted in 2008 to a dual-use military and civil airport with an investment of 64 million yuan. The airport was opened to commercial flights on September 28, 2008.

The airport, which is restricted between the two urban cores of the city, will be replaced by the new dual-use Tianshui Zhongliang Airport (天水中梁机场), to be located 20 km west, near Zhongliang Town. The new airport will measure 4 km^{2}, and have a 3,200 m (10,500 ft) runway. Construction of the new airport started on 26 September 2020, and it is expected to open by December 2026.

Between 31 May 2025 and 18 June 2026, the airport closed for renovations.

== Facilities ==
Tianshui Airport has one runway that is 2,800 metres (9,200 feet) long and 45 metres (148 feet) wide (class 3C), and a 2,158-square-metre (23,230-square-foot) terminal building.

== Military use ==
The nearby AVIC Tianshui Aviation Industry company uses the airport to receive and deliver aircraft under maintenance.

== Airlines and destinations ==
Airlines	Destinations
Beijing Capital Airlines	Beijing-Daxing
China Express Airlines	Tianjin, Chongqing

== Gallery ==
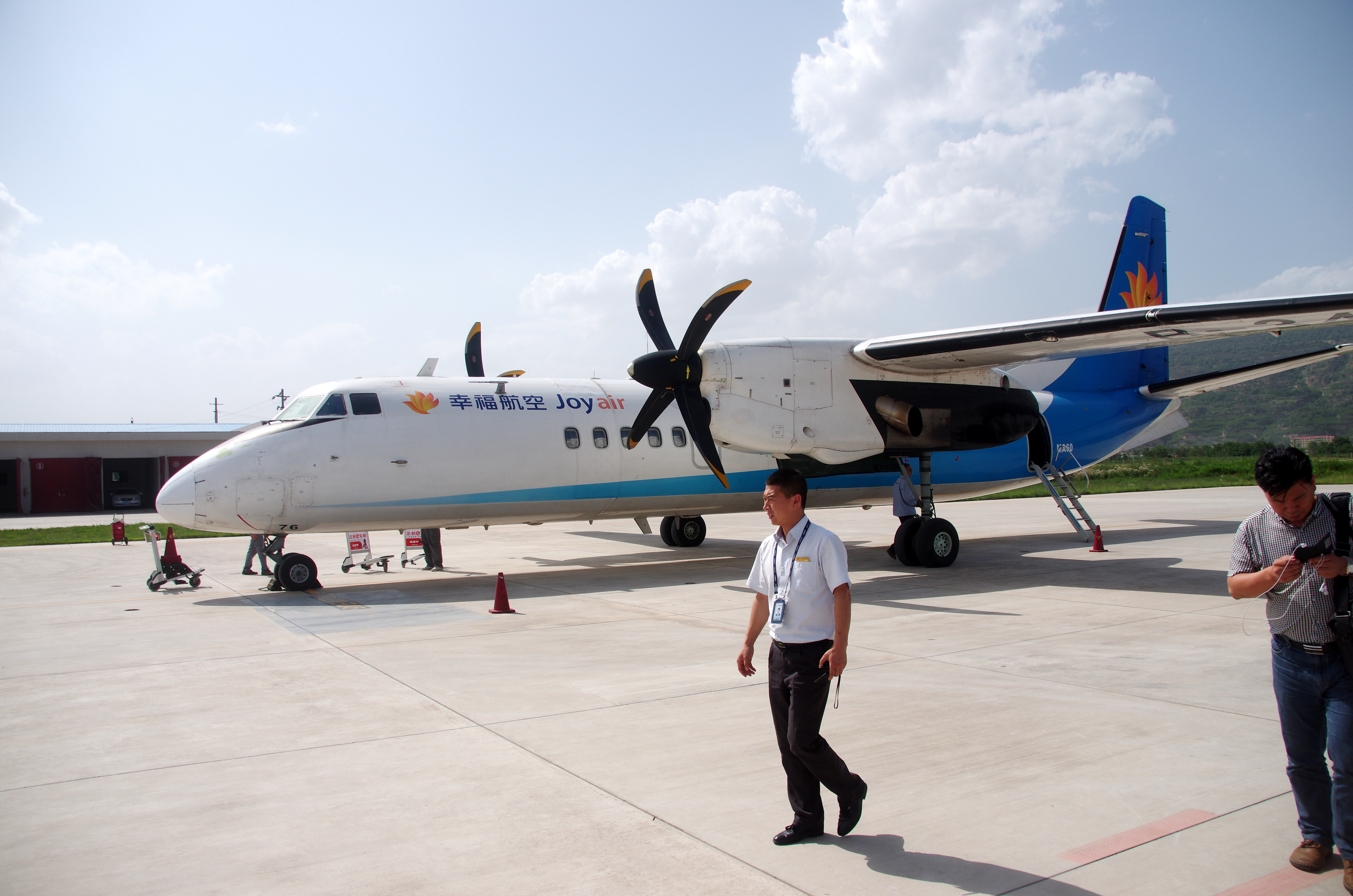
Joy Air MA-60 at Tianshui Maijishan Airport

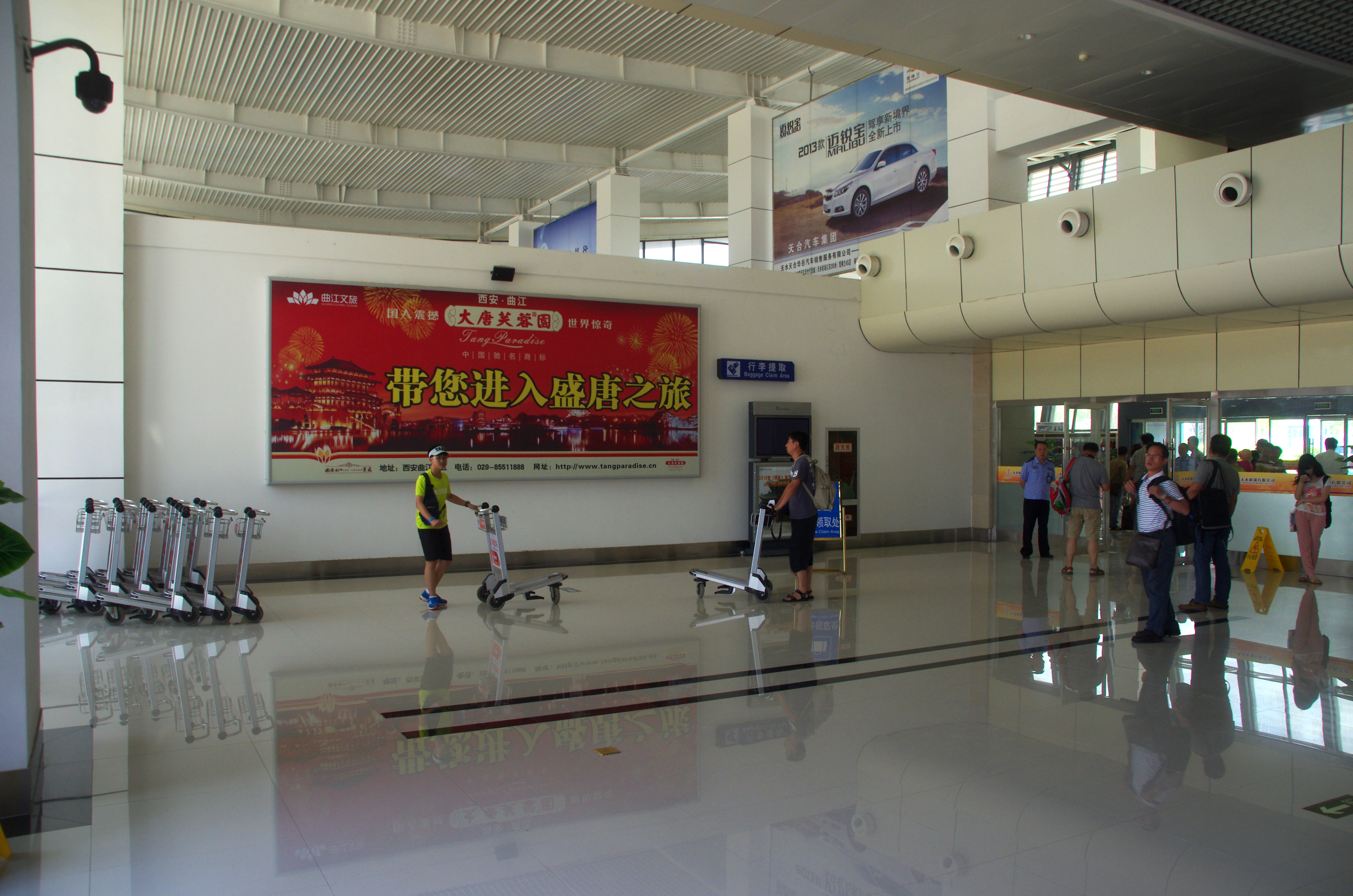
Tianshui Maijishan Airport baggage reclaim hall

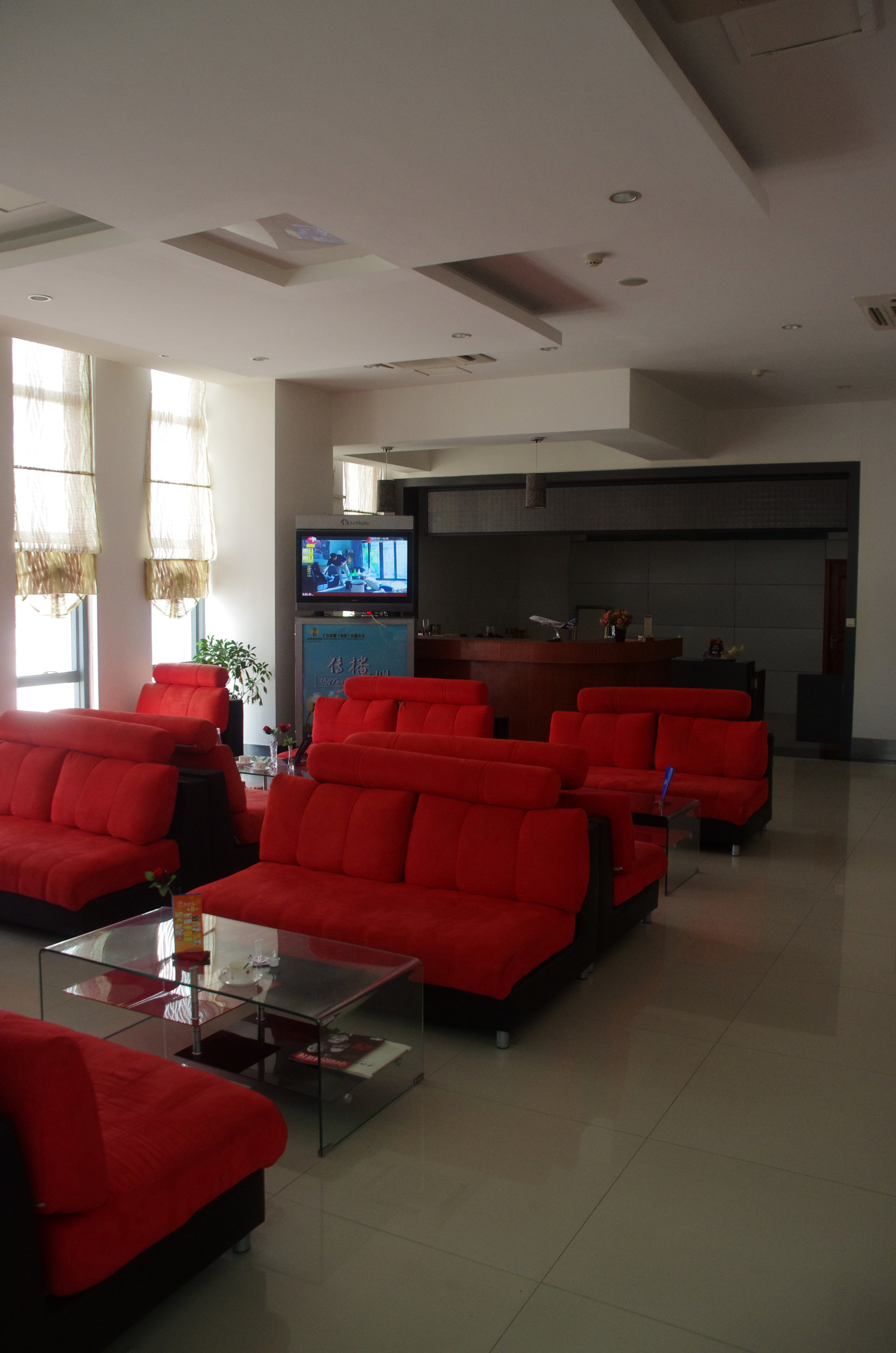
Tianshui Maijishan Airport cafe

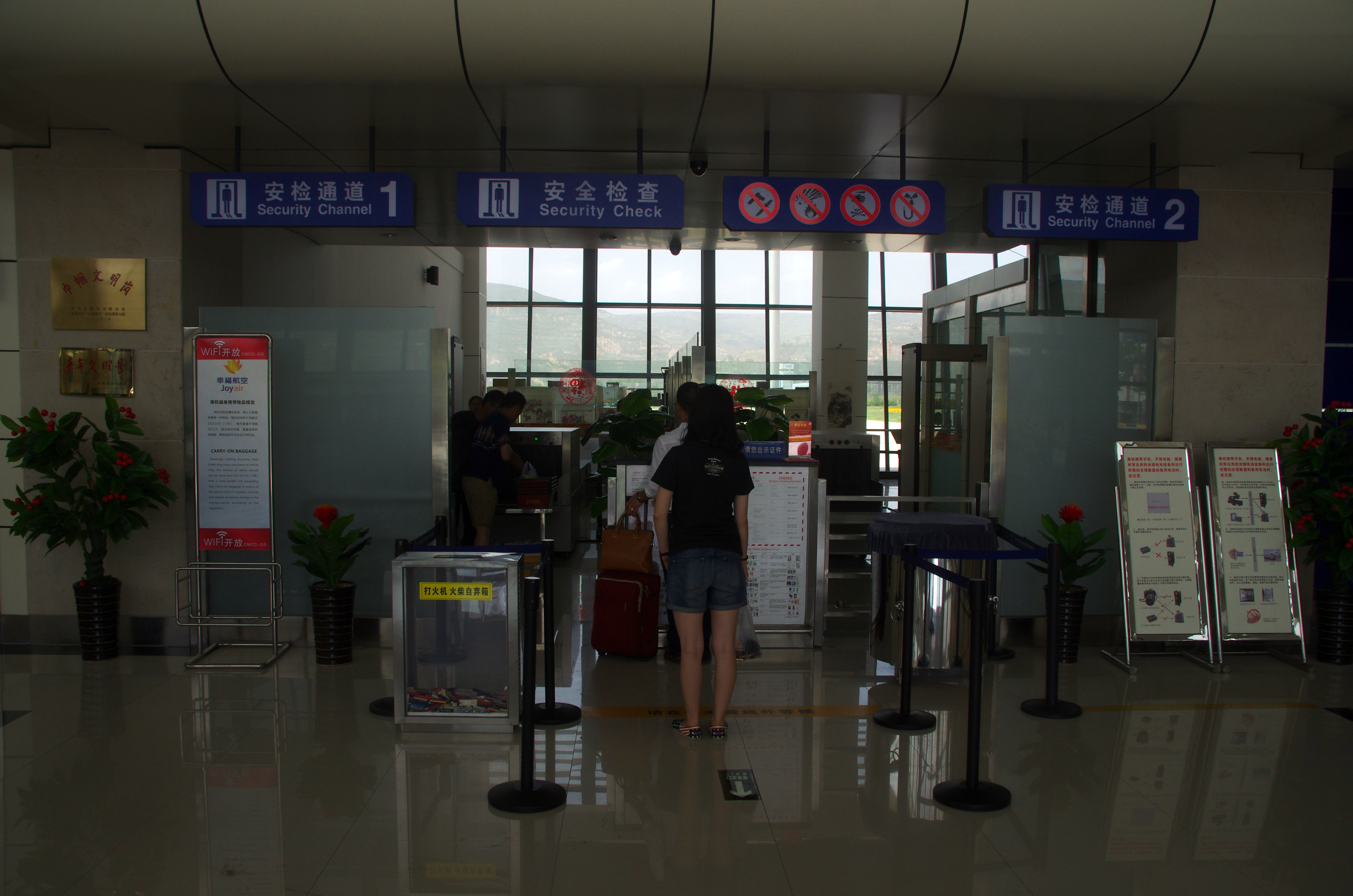
Tianshui Maijishan Airport security check

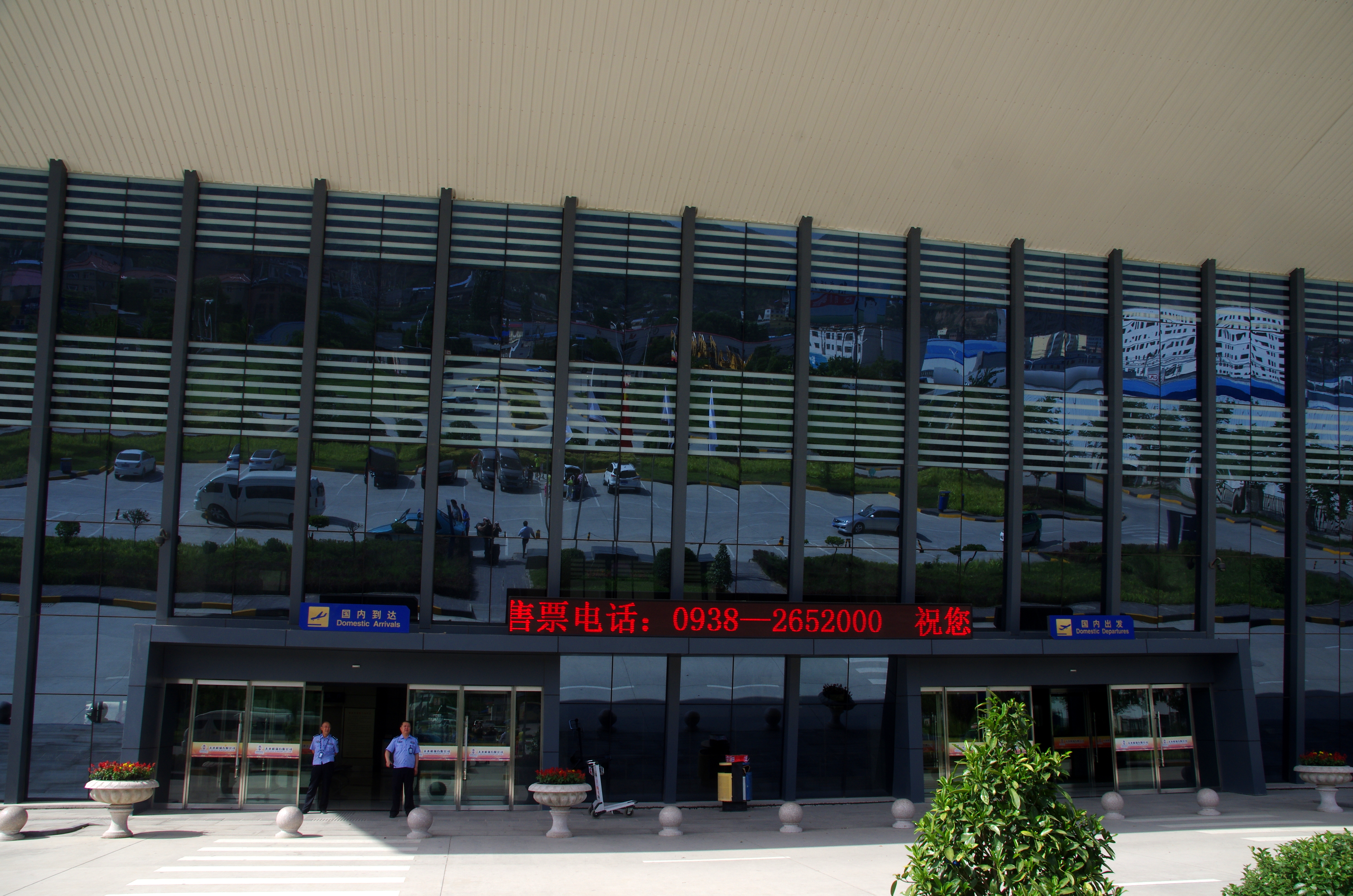
Tianshui Maijishan Airport entrance

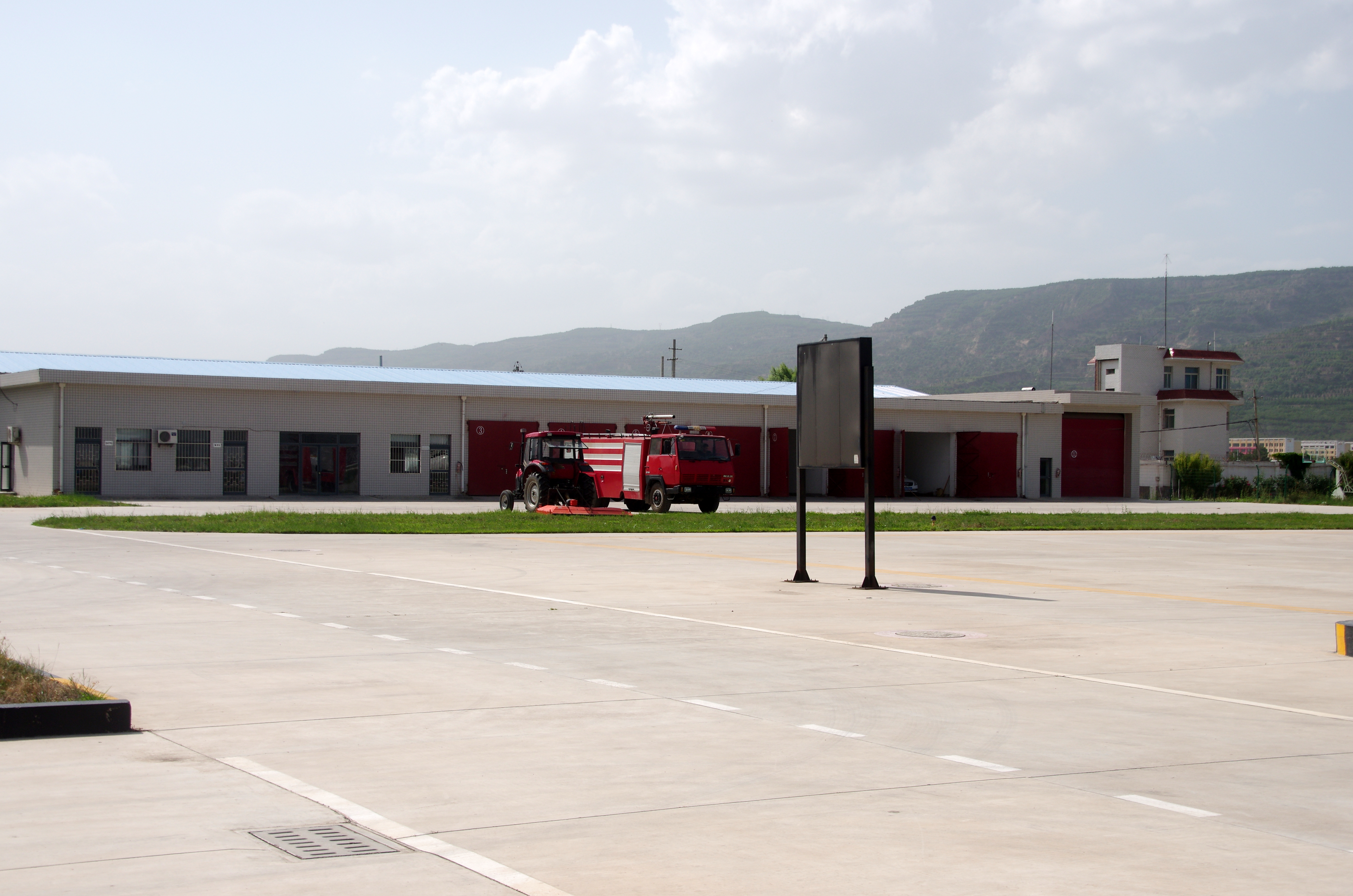
Tianshui Maijishan Airport fire station

== See also ==
- List of airports in China
- List of the busiest airports in China
- List of People's Liberation Army Air Force airbases
