= Baoji railway station =

Railway station in Baoji, China

Baoji 宝鸡
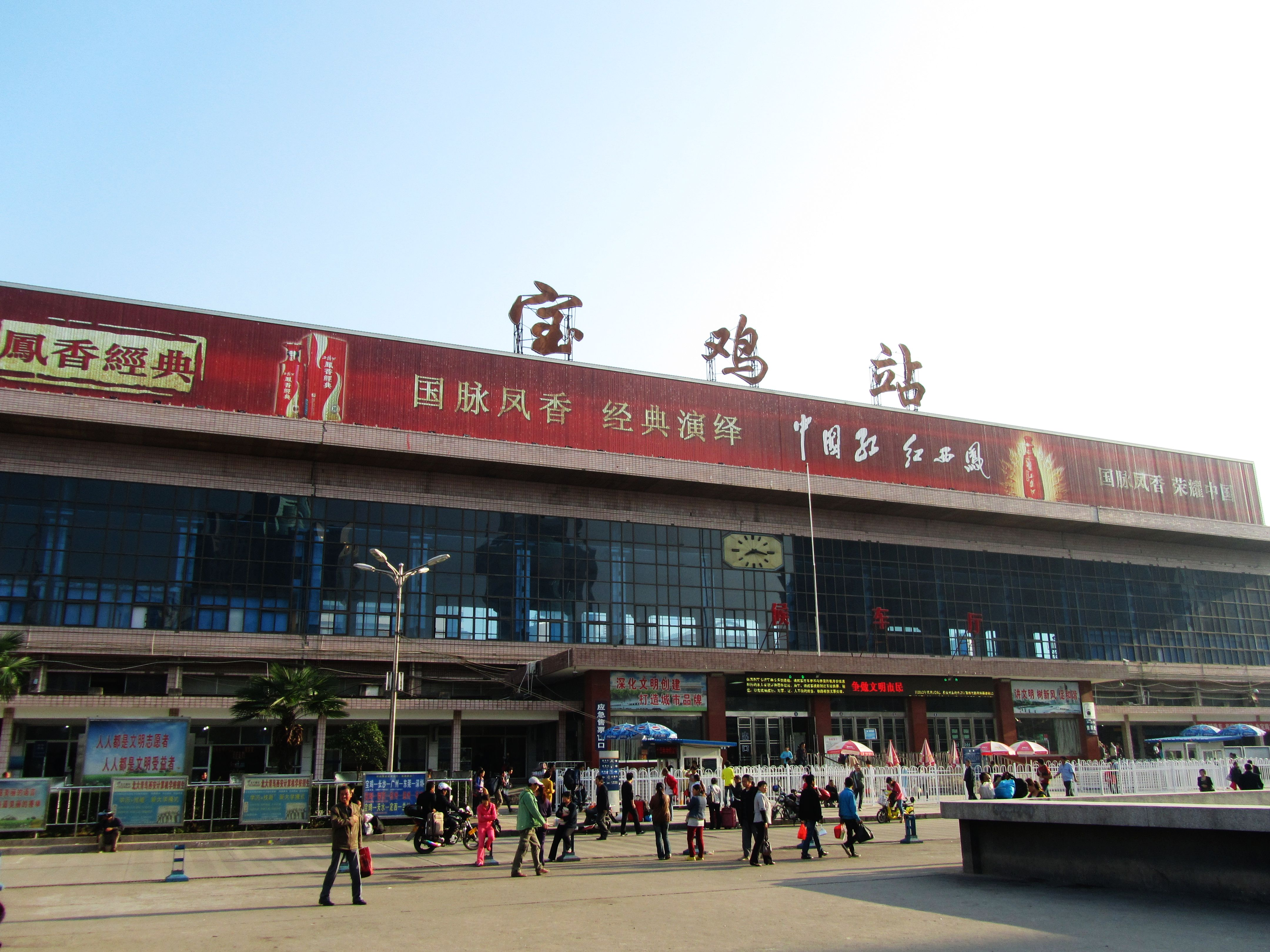
- A view of the Baoji Railway Station.

General information
- Location: 1 Yingbin Road; Weibin District, Baoji, Shaanxi; China
- Coordinates: 34°22′27″N 107°8′53″E
- Operator: CR Xi'an
- Lines: Longhai railway; Baoji–Chengdu railway; Baoji–Zhongwei railway
- Platforms: 6 (2 side platforms and 2 island platforms)
- Connections: Bus terminal

Other information
- Station code: 39629 (TMIS code); BJY (telegraph code); BJI (Pinyin code)
- Classification: Class 1 station (一等站)

History
- Opened: 1936

Services
Preceding station	China Railway	Following station
Guozhen towards Lianyungang East	Longhai railway	Tianshui towards Lanzhou
Location
- Location within China

Baoji railway station is a railway station in Weibin District, Baoji, China. It is the junction of Baocheng Railway, Longhai Railway and Baozhong Railway. The station was constructed in 1936.
