= China Railway Signal & Communication =

Company in Beijing, China

China Railway Signal & Communication Corporation Limited
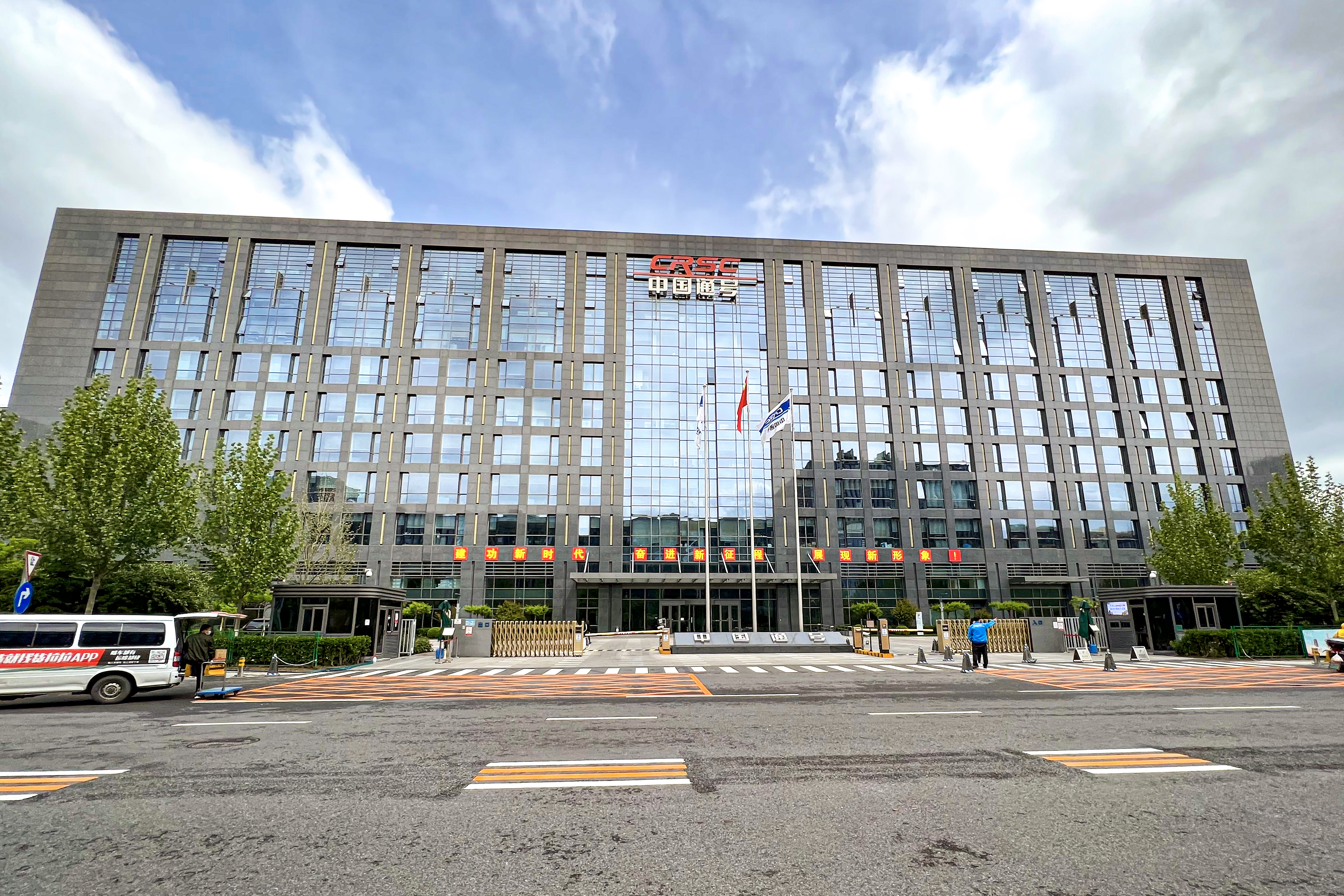
- CRSC headquarters at Kandan Subdistrict, Fengtai District, Beijing
- Native name: 中国铁路通信信号集团有限公司 (short name: 中国通号)
- Company type: public
- Traded as: 3969.HK
- Industry: Train control systems
- Founded: 2010
- Headquarters: CRSC Building, Beijing, China
- Area served: China
- Key people: Zhou Zhiliang (Chairman)
- Revenue: 34.4 billion CNY (2017)
- Operating income: 3.3 billion CNY (2017)
- Total assets: 61.2 billion CNY (2017)
- Subsidiaries: Beijing National Railway Research & Design Institute of Signal & Communication
- Website: www.crsc.cn

China Railway Signal & Communication (CRSC) is a Chinese company specializing in train control systems, such as signals. The company was established by a merger of several (state-owned) enterprises in 2010 and went public in 2015. The roots of the company date back to 1953.

The company is the developer of the Chinese Train Control System.

== Subsidiaries ==
- CRSC Vehicle Corp (通号轨道车辆有限公司), a manufacturer of low floor trams, based in Changsha. It is a joint venture of CRSC and Inekon Trams of Czech Republic
- CASCO Signal Ltd (卡斯柯信号有限公司), signal solution provider headquartered in Shanghai. Is a joint venture of CRSC and Alstom

== Controversy ==
CRSC is the maker of the signaling equipment used on the track of the Wenzhou train collision, and was held partially responsible for the disaster.
