= Tianshui =

Prefecture-level city in Gansu, China

Tianshui 天水市
- Prefecture-level city
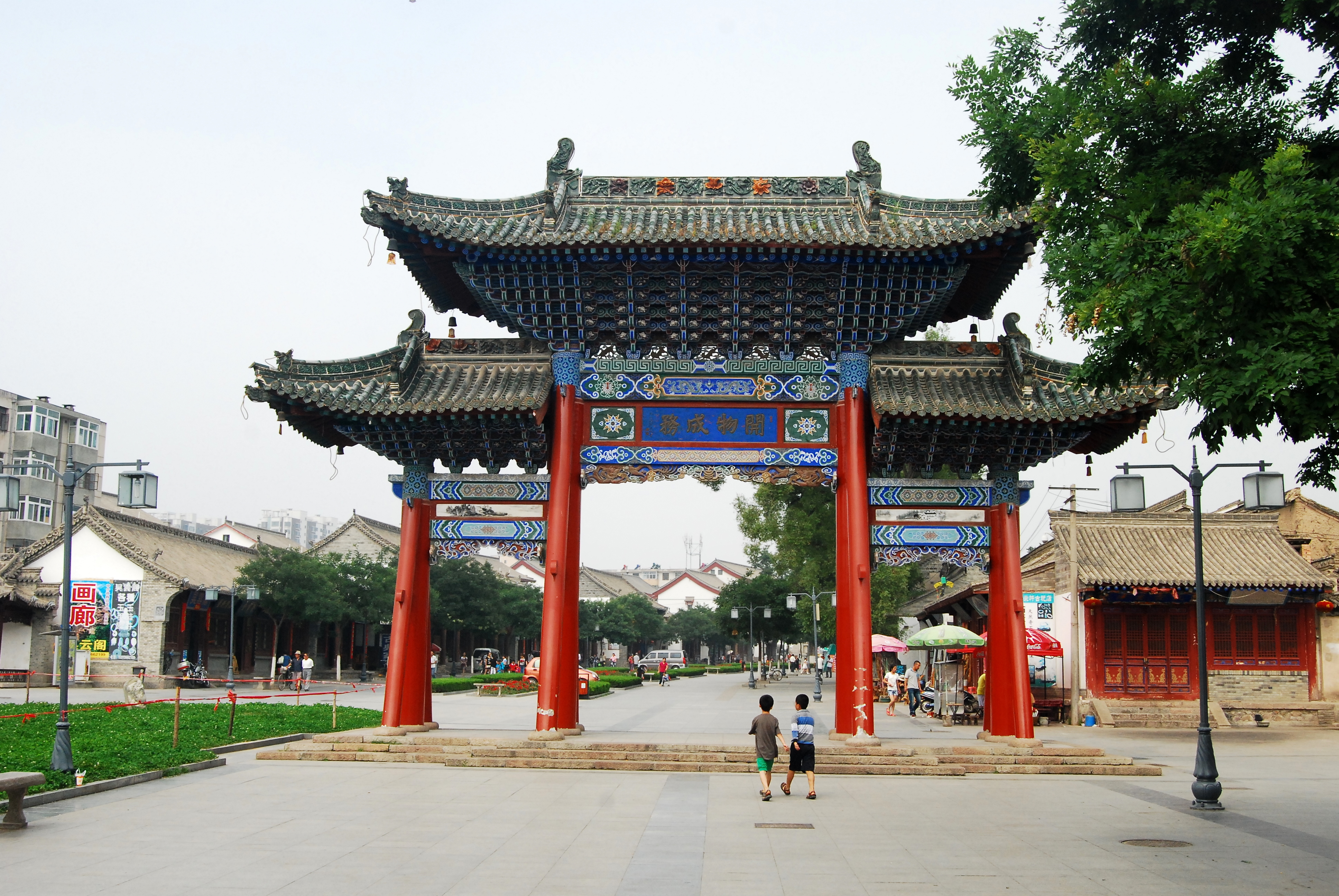
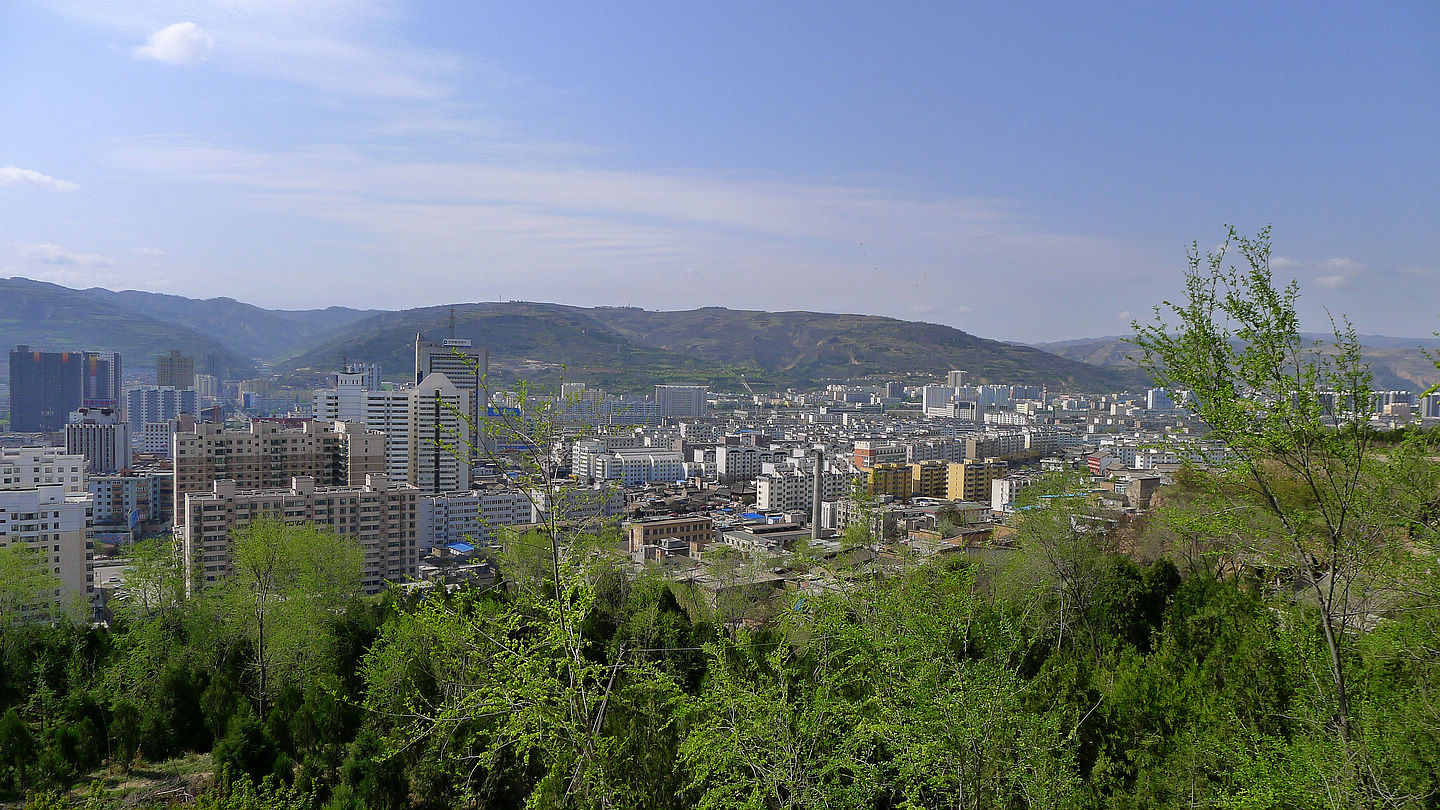
- Tianshui Fuyi pedestrian street (top), Tianshui skyline

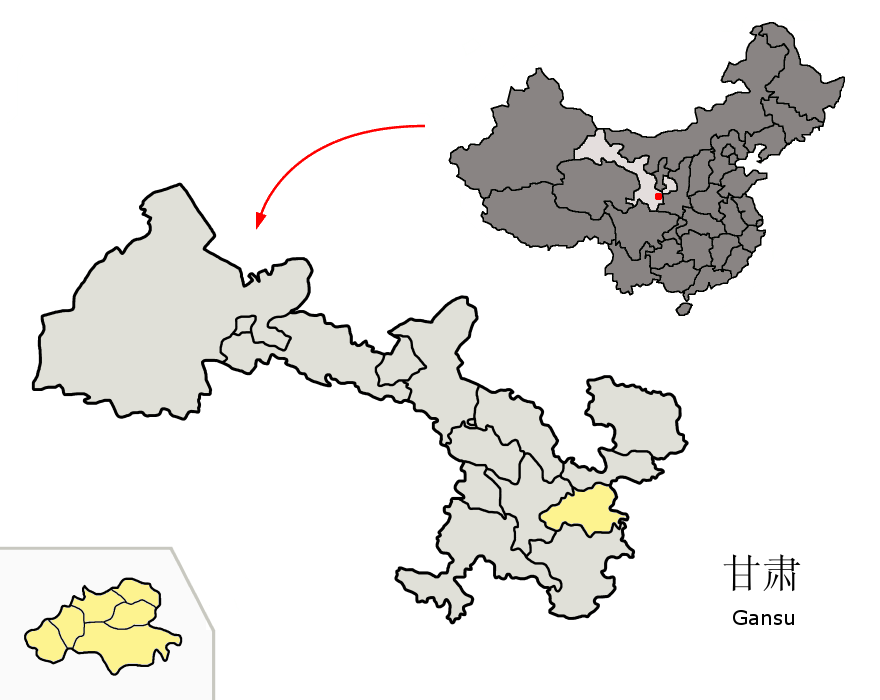
- Location of Tianshui City jurisdiction in Gansu

- Location within Gansu Location within China
- Coordinates (Tianshui municipal government): 34°34′53″N 105°43′29″E
- Country: People's Republic of China
- Province: Gansu
- Municipal seat: Qinzhou District

Area
  - Prefecture-level city: 14,280 km^{2} (5,510 sq mi)
  - Urban: 5,866 km^{2} (2,265 sq mi)
  - Metro: 5,866 km^{2} (2,265 sq mi)
- Elevation: 1,171 m (3,842 ft)

Population (2020 census)
  - Prefecture-level city: 2,984,659
  - Density: 209.0/km^{2} (541.3/sq mi)
  - Urban: 1,212,791
  - Urban density: 206.7/km^{2} (535.5/sq mi)
  - Metro: 1,212,791
  - Metro density: 206.7/km^{2} (535.5/sq mi)

GDP
  - Prefecture-level city: CN¥ 55.4 billion US$ 8.9 billion
  - Per capita: CN¥ 16,743; US$ 2,688
- Time zone: UTC+8 (China Standard)
- Postal code: 741000
- Area code: 0938
- ISO 3166 code: CN-GS-05
- Licence plate prefixes: 甘E
- Website: tianshui.gov.cn

Tianshui
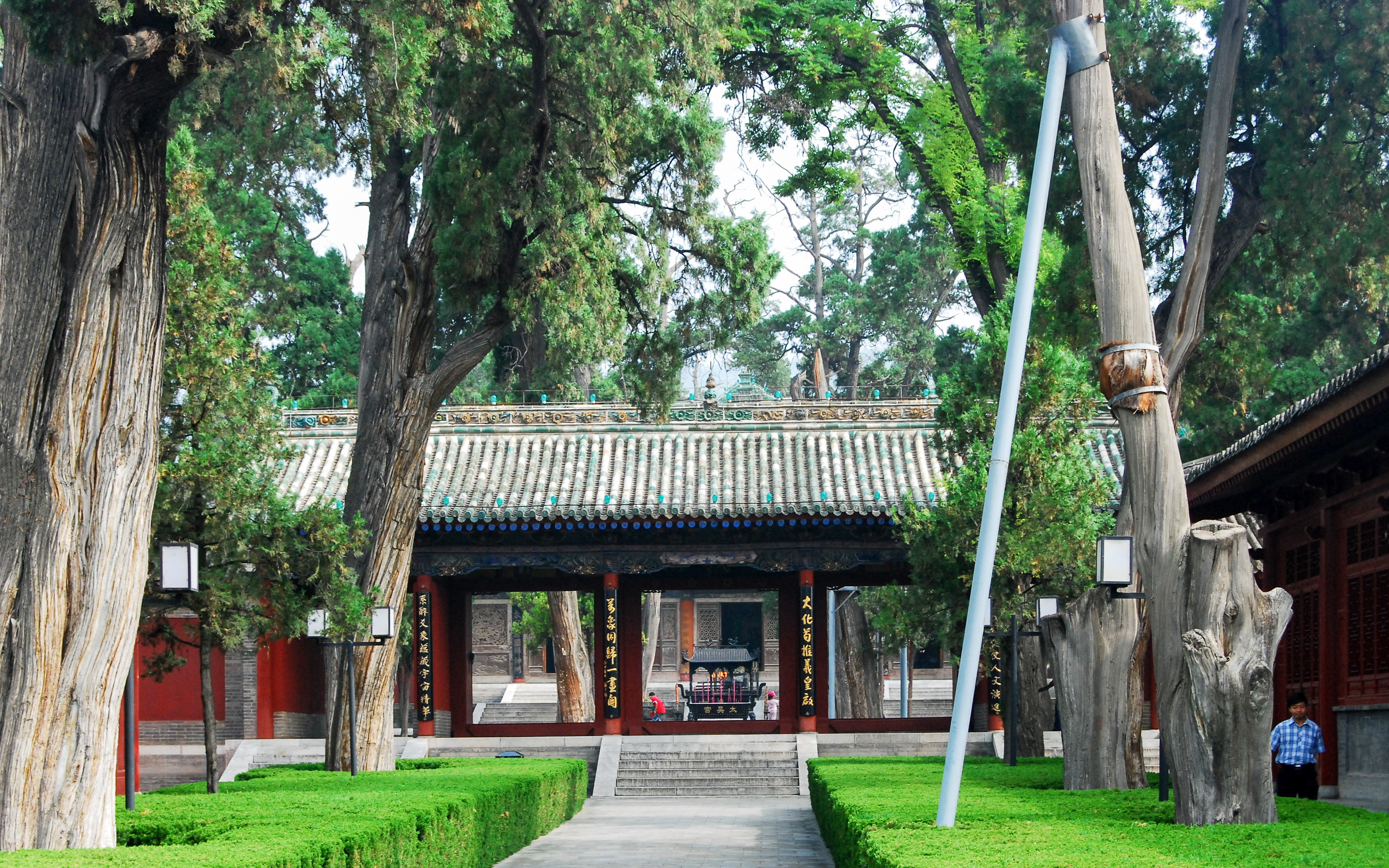
- The entrance to the Fuxi Temple in Tianshui
- Chinese: 天水市
- Postal: Tenshui
- Literal meaning: City of Sky and Water
Transcriptions
Standard Mandarin
- Hanyu Pinyin: Tiānshuǐshì
- Wade–Giles: Tʻien-shui Shih

Qinzhou
- Chinese: 秦州
- Postal: Tsinchow
- Literal meaning: Qin Province
Transcriptions
Standard Mandarin
- Hanyu Pinyin: Qínzhōu
- Wade–Giles: Chʻin-chou

Tianshui Commandery
- Chinese: 天水郡
- Literal meaning: Commandery of Heaven and Water
Transcriptions
Standard Mandarin
- Hanyu Pinyin: Tiānshuǐjùn
- Wade–Giles: Tʻien-shui Chün

Hanyang Commandery
- Simplified Chinese: 汉阳郡
- Traditional Chinese: 漢陽郡
Transcriptions
Standard Mandarin
- Hanyu Pinyin: Hànyángjùn
- Wade–Giles: Han-yang Chun

Hanyang County
- Simplified Chinese: 汉阳县
- Traditional Chinese: 漢陽縣
Transcriptions
Standard Mandarin
- Hanyu Pinyin: Hànyángxiàn
- Wade–Giles: Han-yang Hsien

Tianshui is a prefecture-level city in Gansu province, China, and is the province's second-largest city (behind the provincial capital Lanzhou). Located in the southeast of the province, the city strides along the upper reaches of the Wei River and at the boundary of the Loess Plateau and the Qinling Mountains. As of the 2020 census, its population was 2,984,659 inhabitants, of which 1,212,791 lived in the built-up (or metro) area made of the 2 urban districts of Qinzhou and Maiji. The city and its surroundings have played an important role in the early history of China, as still visible in the form of historic sites such as the Maijishan Grottoes.

== History ==
Qin, whose House of Ying were the ruling family of the founding dynasty of Imperial China, developed from Quanqiu (present-day Lixian) to the south. After the invasions of the Rong which unseated the Western Zhou, Qin recovered the territory of Tianshui from the nomads. It became an important region of their duchy and, later, kingdom. Characteristically Qin tombs have been excavated at Fangmatan nearby, including one 2200-year-old map of Qin's Gui County.

Under the Qin Empire, the area was part of Longxi Commandery but the Emperor Wu of the Han separated the region as the Tianshui Commandery in 114 BC as part of his expansion towards the Tarim Basin. The general Li Guang came from the city. The Han conquests and explorations eventually resulted in the development of the Northern Silk Road: Tianshui formed its junction with the Wei River, after which it followed the road past Mount Long to Chang'an (present-day Xi'an). Nearby are the Maijishan Grottoes, filled with thousands of Buddhist sculptures representing figures such as Buddha and the original male form of Guanyin, produced between the Wei and Song dynasties by monks travelling along the road and by local Buddhists.

During the Northern Wei, the city was known as Hanyang and was the center of the Hanyang Commandery. During the Western Wei, this name was changed to Hanyang County. During the Tang and Five Dynasties, the city of Tianshui was known as Shanggui (上邽). It alternated with Chengji (present-day Qin'an) as the capital of the province of Qinzhou (秦州). Li County was separated from Tianshui's jurisdiction during the ninth year of Chenghua (AD 1473) during the Ming dynasty.

According to a legend, the name Tianshui (天水) originates from a lake formed from heaven, which would remain the same size year round.

== Subdivisions ==
Map
Name	Hanzi	Hanyu Pinyin	Population (2004 est.)	Area (km^{2})	Density (/km^{2})
Qinzhou District	秦州区	Qínzhōu Qū	650,000	2,442	266
Maiji District	麦积区	Màijī Qū	580,000	3,452	188
Qingshui County	清水县	Qīngshuǐ Xiàn	310,000	2,003	155
Qin'an County	秦安县	Qín'ān Xiàn	600,000	1,601	375
Gangu County	甘谷县	Gāngǔ Xiàn	600,000	1,572	382
Wushan County	武山县	Wǔshān Xiàn	440,000	2,011	219
Zhangjiachuan Hui; Autonomous County	张家川回族自治县	Zhāngjiāchuān; Huízú Zìzhìxiàn	320,000	1,311	244

== Geography and climate ==
Tianshui is located in the valley of the Jie River, a major tributary of the Wei River, and on the boundary between the Loess Plateau and Qinling Mountains. The city has a monsoon-influenced, cool semi-arid (Köppen BSk)/humid continental (Dwa) climate, with four distinct seasons of comparatively equal length. Winters are cold but dry, with January 24-hour average temperature of −1.5 °C (29.3 °F), while summers are warm and somewhat humid, with July 24-hour average temperature of 23.2 °C (73.8 °F). Much of the annual rainfall occurs from June to September, and the annual mean temperature is 11.44 °C (52.6 °F). With monthly percent possible sunshine ranging from 34% in September to 50% in December, the city receives 1,911 hours of bright sunshine annually.

Climate data for Tianshui, elevation 1,150 m (3,770 ft), (1991–2020 normals, extremes 1971–2010)
Month	Jan	Feb	Mar	Apr	May	Jun	Jul	Aug	Sep	Oct	Nov	Dec	Year
Record high °C (°F)	12.1 (53.8)	20.2 (68.4)	27.0 (80.6)	31.8 (89.2)	33.9 (93.0)	37.2 (99.0)	38.2 (100.8)	36.1 (97.0)	36.2 (97.2)	28.5 (83.3)	21.6 (70.9)	14.7 (58.5)	38.2 (100.8)
Mean daily maximum °C (°F)	4.3 (39.7)	8.3 (46.9)	14.3 (57.7)	20.8 (69.4)	24.6 (76.3)	28.1 (82.6)	29.8 (85.6)	28.5 (83.3)	22.8 (73.0)	17.1 (62.8)	11.3 (52.3)	5.6 (42.1)	18.0 (64.3)
Daily mean °C (°F)	−1.3 (29.7)	2.4 (36.3)	7.8 (46.0)	13.7 (56.7)	17.7 (63.9)	21.5 (70.7)	23.6 (74.5)	22.5 (72.5)	17.4 (63.3)	11.5 (52.7)	5.5 (41.9)	−0.2 (31.6)	11.8 (53.3)
Mean daily minimum °C (°F)	−5.2 (22.6)	−1.8 (28.8)	2.9 (37.2)	8.0 (46.4)	12.0 (53.6)	16.1 (61.0)	18.6 (65.5)	17.9 (64.2)	13.7 (56.7)	7.8 (46.0)	1.6 (34.9)	−4.0 (24.8)	7.3 (45.1)
Record low °C (°F)	−19.2 (−2.6)	−16.6 (2.1)	−10.0 (14.0)	−6.4 (20.5)	1.8 (35.2)	5.5 (41.9)	10.6 (51.1)	8.4 (47.1)	1.2 (34.2)	−5.1 (22.8)	−11.6 (11.1)	−17.4 (0.7)	−19.2 (−2.6)
Average precipitation mm (inches)	4.6 (0.18)	6.8 (0.27)	18.2 (0.72)	35.2 (1.39)	55.7 (2.19)	63.3 (2.49)	90.2 (3.55)	84.0 (3.31)	77.0 (3.03)	43.9 (1.73)	11.4 (0.45)	3.3 (0.13)	493.6 (19.44)
Average precipitation days (≥ 0.1 mm)	5.1	4.9	6.6	7.8	9.8	10.3	11.3	10.9	12.1	10.5	5.7	2.8	97.8
Average snowy days	8.3	6.3	2.7	0.3	0	0	0	0	0	0.1	2.1	5.0	24.8
Average relative humidity (%)	61	60	57	55	59	63	67	70	75	76	71	64	65
Mean monthly sunshine hours	140.1	129.0	163.2	193.3	204.7	191.3	193.7	179.4	117.6	115.3	125.4	143.7	1,896.7
Percentage possible sunshine	44	41	44	49	47	44	44	44	32	33	41	47	43
Source: China Meteorological Administration

== Economy ==
Due to the mild climate, Tianshui is a large producer of fruits, in particular apples.

It is also a major industrial centre in Gansu province, especially regarding electronics. Some major industries include:

- AVIC Tianshui Aviation Industry
- Tianshui Pneumatic Machinery Corporation
- Tianshui Tractor Factory
- Spark Machine Tools

== Transportation ==
=== Airlines ===
Tianshui Maijishan Airport is located near the built up area.

=== Railway ===
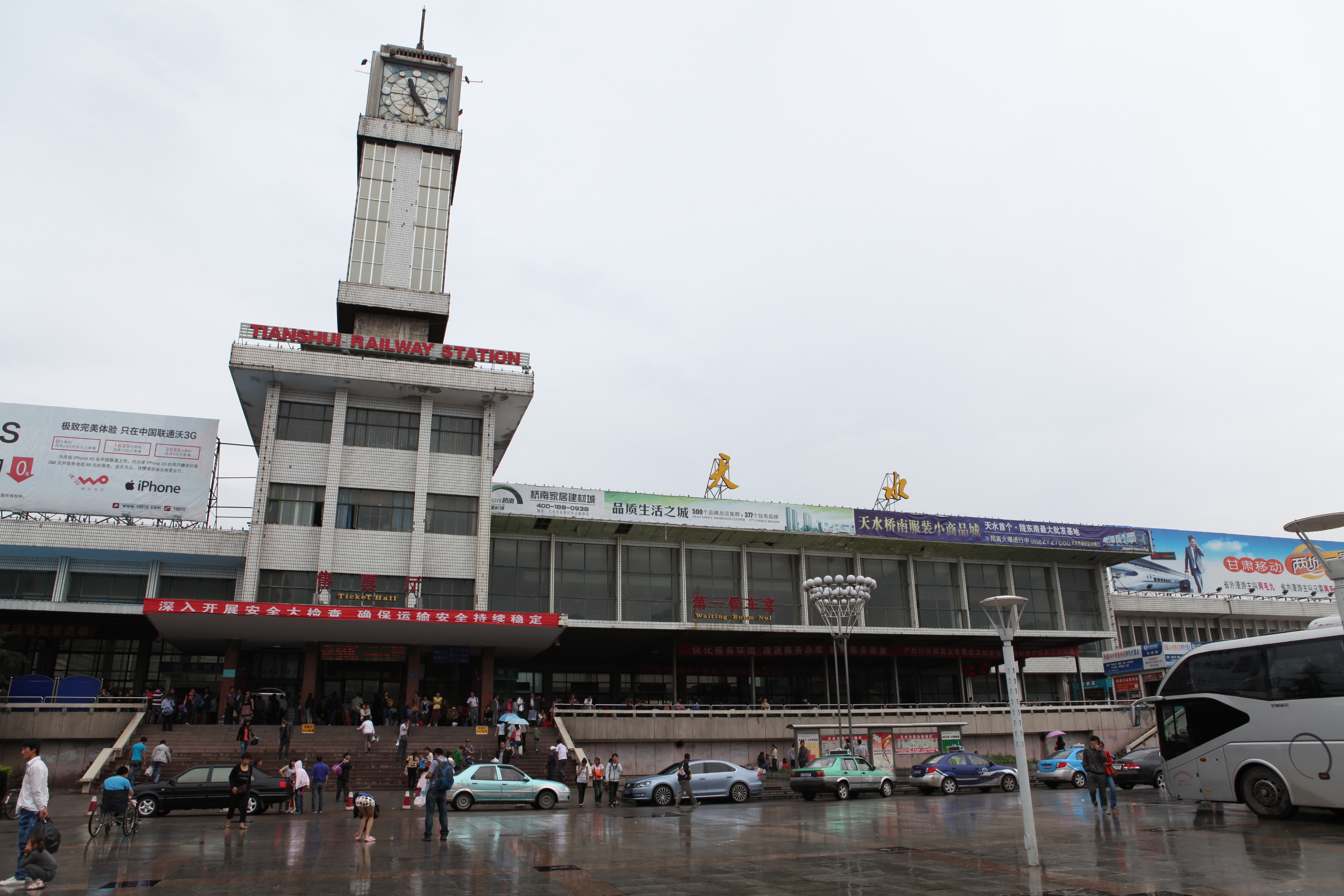
Tianshui railway station

Tianshui is currently serviced by Tianshui railway station on the Longhai Railway. The railway station is connected to downtown by the Tianshui Tram.

A new high-speed railway station, Tianshui South railway station, opened in 2017.

The Tianshui–Longnan railway is currently under construction and will add a north–south link to the county.

=== Highways ===
The Lianyungang–Khorgas Expressway connects Tianshui to Baoji/Xi'an in the east and Dingxi, Lanzhou towards the northwest and supersedes highway G310. G310 runs as a motorway within the urban centre.

- G7011 Shiyan–Tianshui Expressway
- G8513 Pingliang–Mianyang Expressway (section from Tianshui north to Pingliang is under construction)
- China National Highway 310

== Culture ==
Tianshui's signature dish is Guagua (呱呱), a sticky boiled buckwheat flour meal, seasoned with chili oil, sesame paste, mustard, oil, salt, vinegar and garlic paste. The dish is normally eaten as a breakfast. According to legends it was the imperial food during Han dynasty general Wei Xiao's rule.

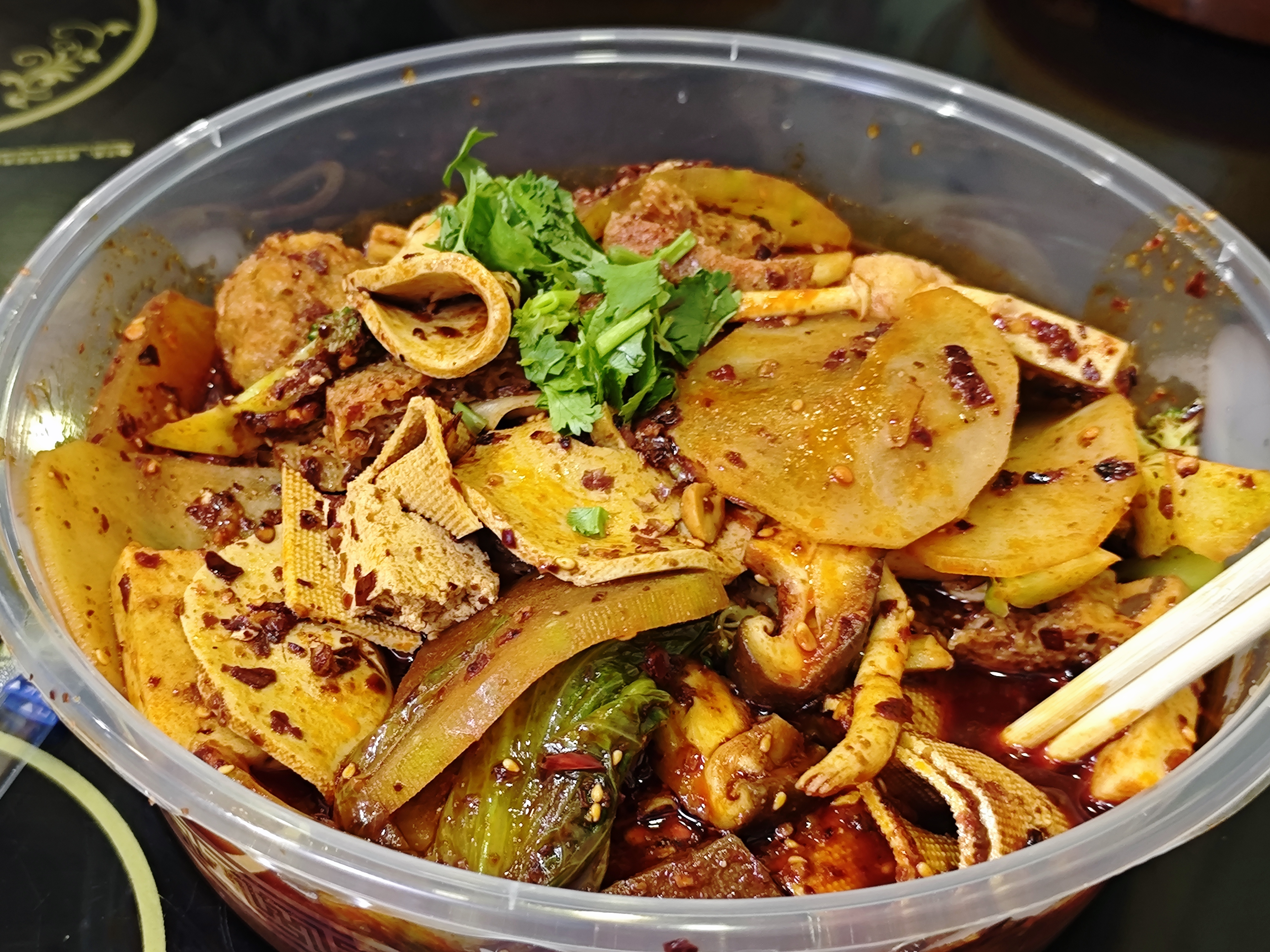
Tianshui malatang

In early 2024 Tianshui malatang hot pot went viral online in China, attracting many tourists from all over the country to go and taste the dish. The numbing sensation of spiciness forms the "soul flavor" of Tianshui spicy hot pot. This "soul" comes from local specialty ingredients in Tianshui – Maiji peppercorns and Gangu chili peppers. The viral phenomenon has been compared to the 2023 spring festival Zibo BBQ craze.

== Tourism ==
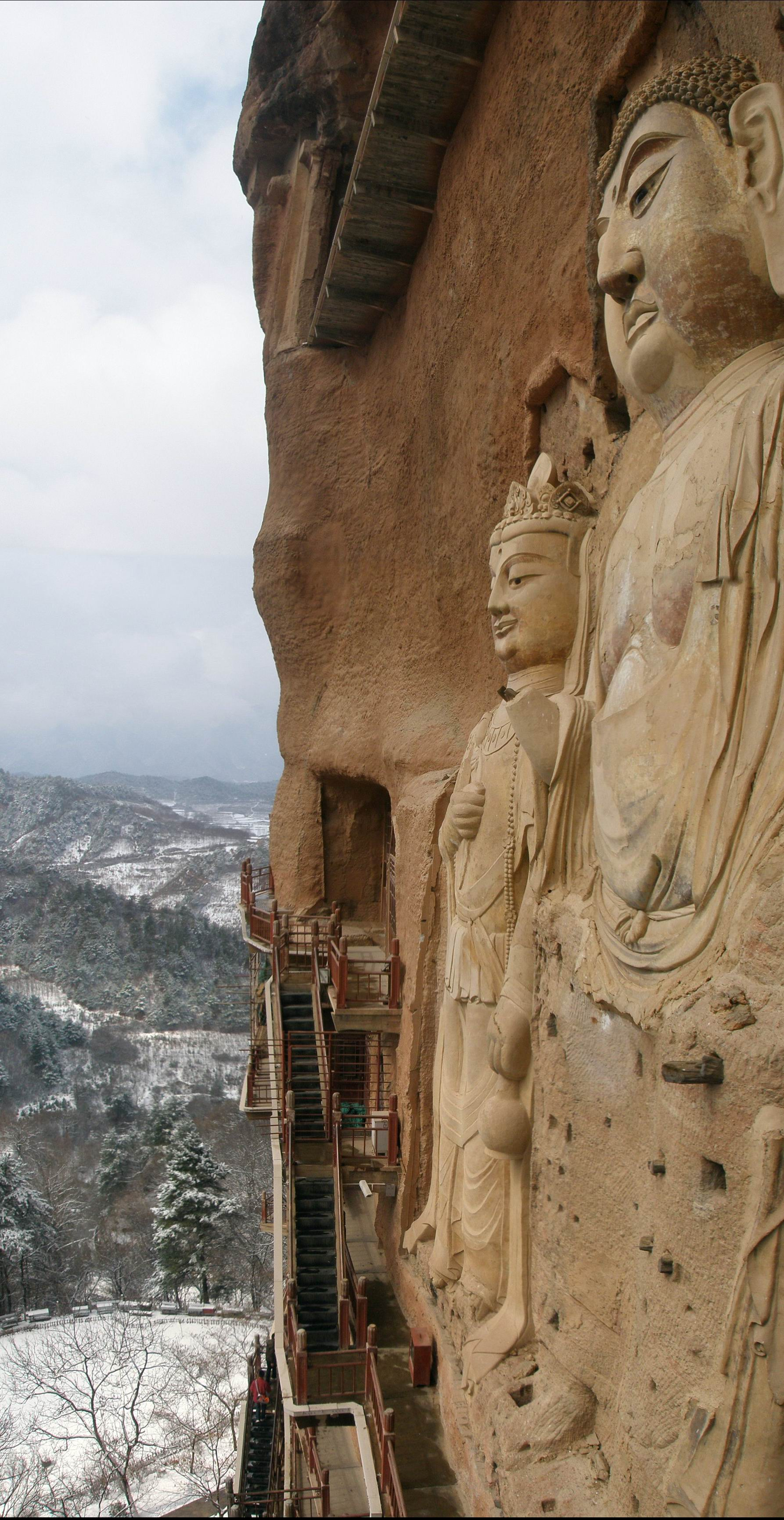
Large Bodhisattva statues on Maijishan

- Maijishan Grottoes
- Fuxi Temple
- Yuquan Temple
- Dadiwan Site

== Education ==
- Tianshui Normal University
- Gansu Electric Science Research Institute

== See also ==
- List of twin towns and sister cities in China
- Tianshui Association
