= Maiji, Tianshui =

Maiji 麦积区
- County
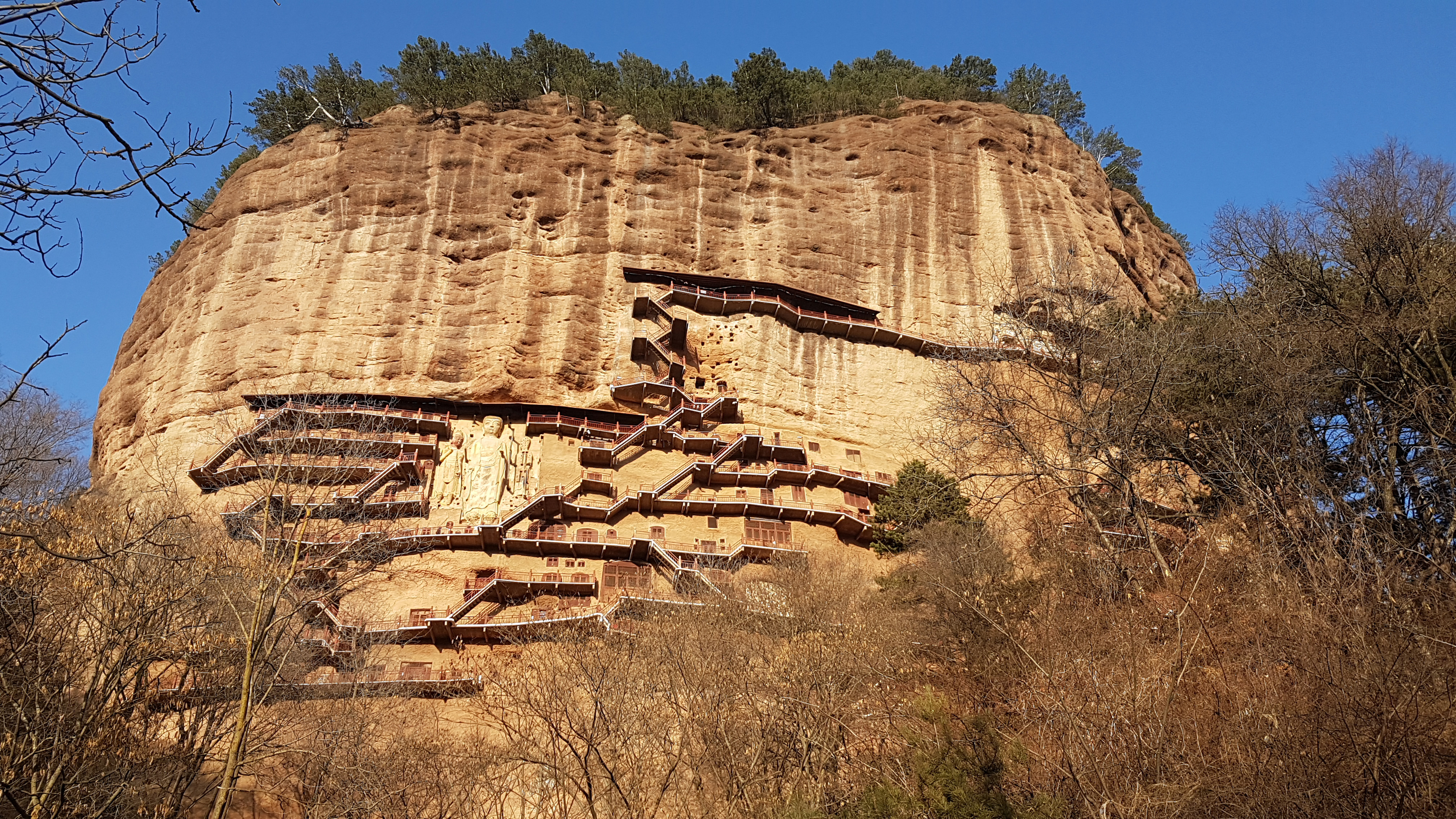
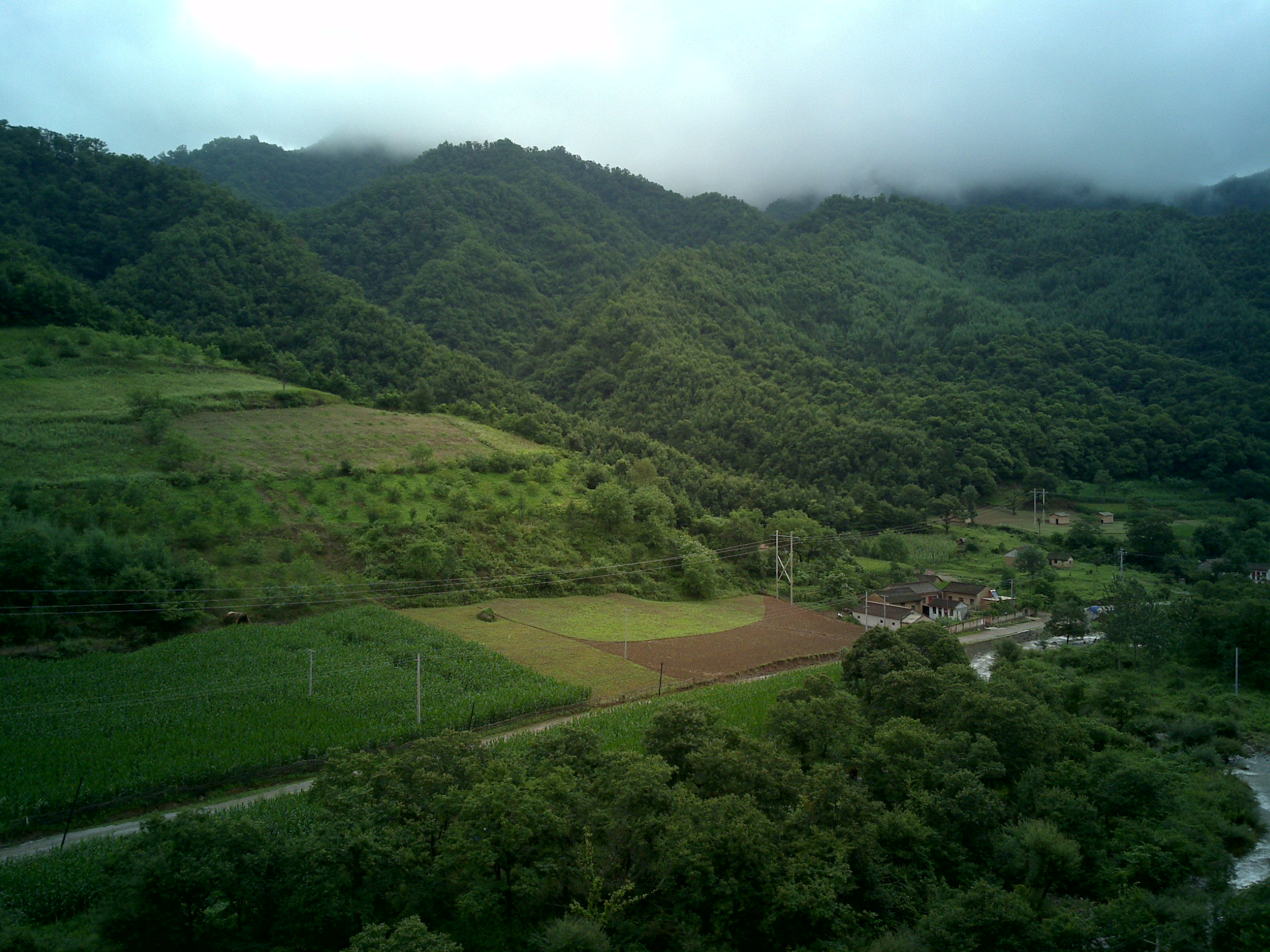
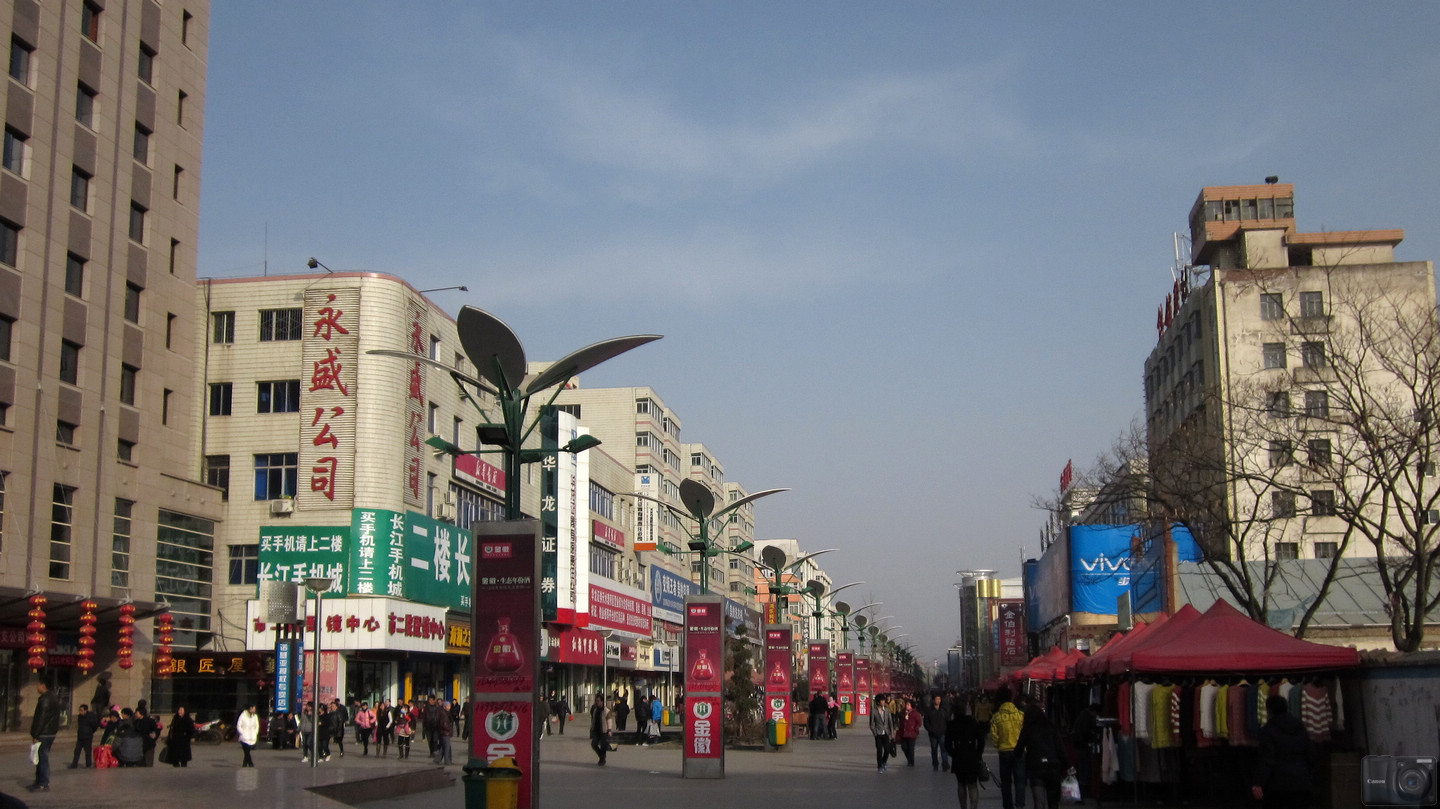
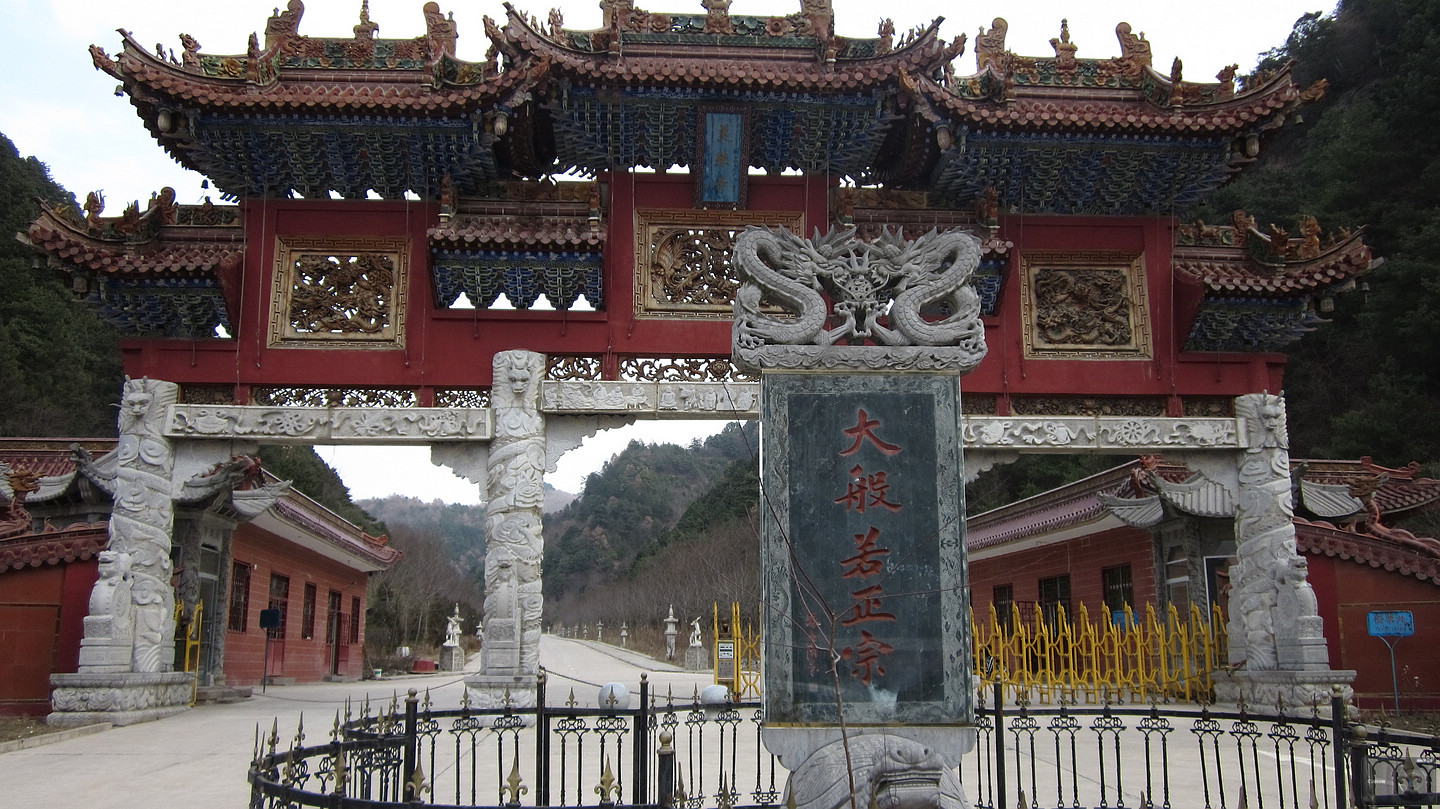
- Clockwise from top: Maijishan Grottoes, pedestrian street in Tongshui City, the gate to Jingtu Temple, the Longhai Railway in Yuanlong, and scenery off the Baoji-Tianshui Expressway.

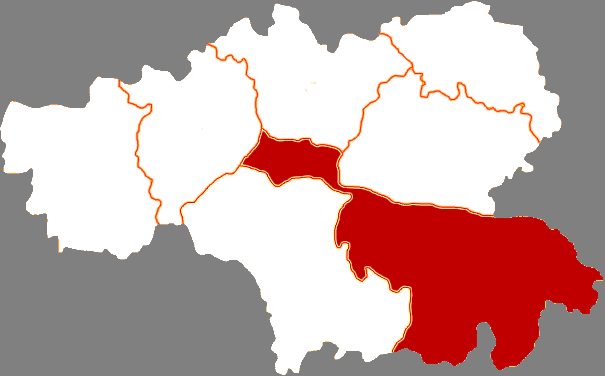
- Maiji in Tianshui

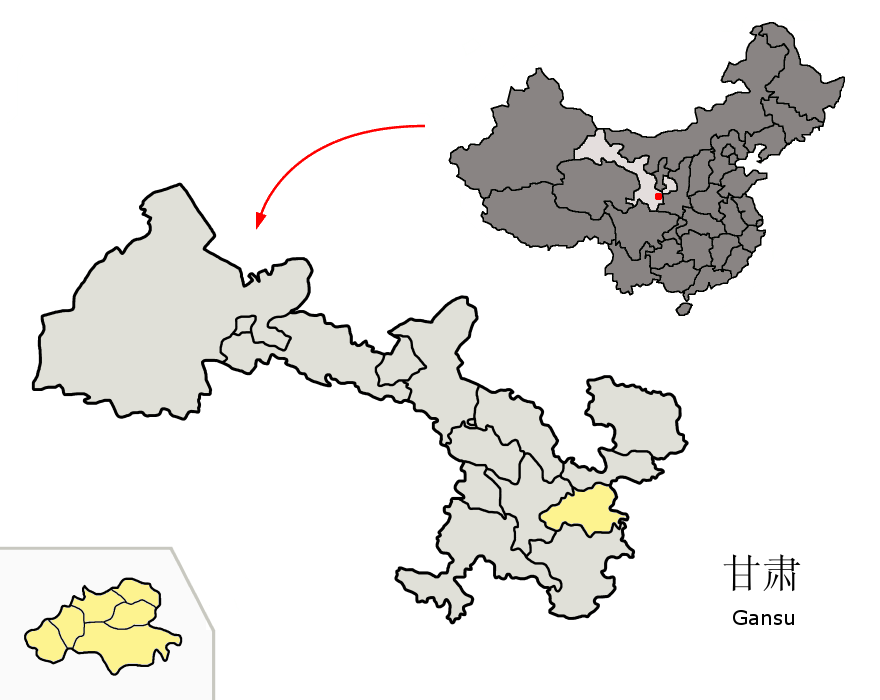
- Tianshui in Gansu
- Coordinates: 34°34′16″N 105°53′20″E
- Country: China
- Province: Gansu
- Prefecture-level city: Tianshui
- District seat: Daoshui

Area
  - County: 3,452 km^{2} (1,333 sq mi)

Population (2020)
  - County: 556,102
  - Density: 161.1/km^{2} (417.2/sq mi)
  - Urban: 200,000
- Time zone: UTC+8 (CST)
- Postal code: 741020
- Website: www.maiji.gov.cn

Maiji District (simplified Chinese: 麦积区; traditional Chinese: 麥積區; pinyin: Màijī Qū) is a district of the prefecture-level city of Tianshui in the southeast of Gansu Province, China, bordering Shaanxi Province to the east. It is best known for, and named after, the Maijishan Grottoes. Before 2005 it was called Beidao District.

Maiji District is subdivided in 17 towns (containing 379 villages), 3 subdistricts (containing 35 residential communities). 69% of the population is rural. 68% of the district's area is covered in forest.

== Administrative divisions ==
Maiji District is divided to 3 subdistricts and 17 towns:

Subdistricts

- Daobei Subdistrict (道北街道)
- Beidaobu Subdistrict (北道埠街道)
- Qiaonan Subdistrict (桥南街道)

Towns

- Shetang (社棠镇)
- Mapaoquan (马跑泉镇)
- Ganquan (甘泉镇)
- Weinan (渭南镇)
- Dongcha (东岔镇)
- Huaniu (花牛镇)
- Zhongtan (中滩镇)
- Xinyang (新阳镇)
- Yuanlong (元龙镇)
- Boyang (伯阳镇)
- Maiji (麦积镇)
- Shifo (石佛镇)
- Sancha (三岔镇)
- Hupo (琥珀镇)
- Liqiao (利桥镇)
- Wulong (五龙镇)
- Dangchuan (党川镇)

The towns of Weinan, Zhongtan and Shifo together are also known under the name Sanyuanchuan (三阳川).

== Climate ==
Climate data for Maiji, elevation 1,085 m (3,560 ft), (1991–2020 normals, extremes 1981–2010)
Month	Jan	Feb	Mar	Apr	May	Jun	Jul	Aug	Sep	Oct	Nov	Dec	Year
Record high °C (°F)	14.7 (58.5)	21.4 (70.5)	29.9 (85.8)	33.4 (92.1)	34.5 (94.1)	36.3 (97.3)	37.2 (99.0)	35.9 (96.6)	36.3 (97.3)	28.6 (83.5)	22.2 (72.0)	14.0 (57.2)	37.2 (99.0)
Mean daily maximum °C (°F)	4.8 (40.6)	8.7 (47.7)	14.7 (58.5)	21.1 (70.0)	24.9 (76.8)	28.3 (82.9)	29.9 (85.8)	28.7 (83.7)	23.2 (73.8)	17.5 (63.5)	11.6 (52.9)	5.9 (42.6)	18.3 (64.9)
Daily mean °C (°F)	−1.6 (29.1)	2.3 (36.1)	7.8 (46.0)	13.6 (56.5)	17.6 (63.7)	21.3 (70.3)	23.6 (74.5)	22.5 (72.5)	17.4 (63.3)	11.4 (52.5)	5.1 (41.2)	−0.7 (30.7)	11.7 (53.0)
Mean daily minimum °C (°F)	−5.9 (21.4)	−2.4 (27.7)	2.3 (36.1)	7.1 (44.8)	11.2 (52.2)	15.4 (59.7)	18.3 (64.9)	17.6 (63.7)	13.2 (55.8)	7.1 (44.8)	0.6 (33.1)	−5.1 (22.8)	6.6 (43.9)
Record low °C (°F)	−15.1 (4.8)	−14.1 (6.6)	−9.7 (14.5)	−3.4 (25.9)	0.5 (32.9)	5.3 (41.5)	9.2 (48.6)	9.0 (48.2)	2.7 (36.9)	−5.1 (22.8)	−12.1 (10.2)	−17.6 (0.3)	−17.6 (0.3)
Average precipitation mm (inches)	3.6 (0.14)	6.0 (0.24)	16.7 (0.66)	35.5 (1.40)	57.3 (2.26)	71.5 (2.81)	97.6 (3.84)	94.6 (3.72)	78.3 (3.08)	45.9 (1.81)	11.4 (0.45)	3.0 (0.12)	521.4 (20.53)
Average precipitation days (≥ 0.1 mm)	4.2	4.3	6.3	7.7	10.0	10.5	11.3	10.6	12.1	10.2	5.3	2.9	95.4
Average snowy days	7.1	5.2	2.3	0.3	0	0	0	0	0	0.1	2.3	4.5	21.8
Average relative humidity (%)	64	62	58	58	62	66	69	72	77	78	74	68	67
Mean monthly sunshine hours	137.4	130.8	167.6	202.9	214.9	205.4	214.4	198.4	133.7	124.6	128.1	138.8	1,997
Percentage possible sunshine	44	42	45	52	50	48	49	48	36	36	42	46	45
Source: China Meteorological Administration

== Economy ==
Huaniu apples are a speciality agricultural product grown in the area. Other produce grown include forest fruits, vegetables and grapes.

Industries include machinery manufacturing, electrical appliance production, IT, medicine, food production, and building materials.

== See also ==
- List of administrative divisions of Gansu
