= Baoji–Chengdu railway =

Railway line in China

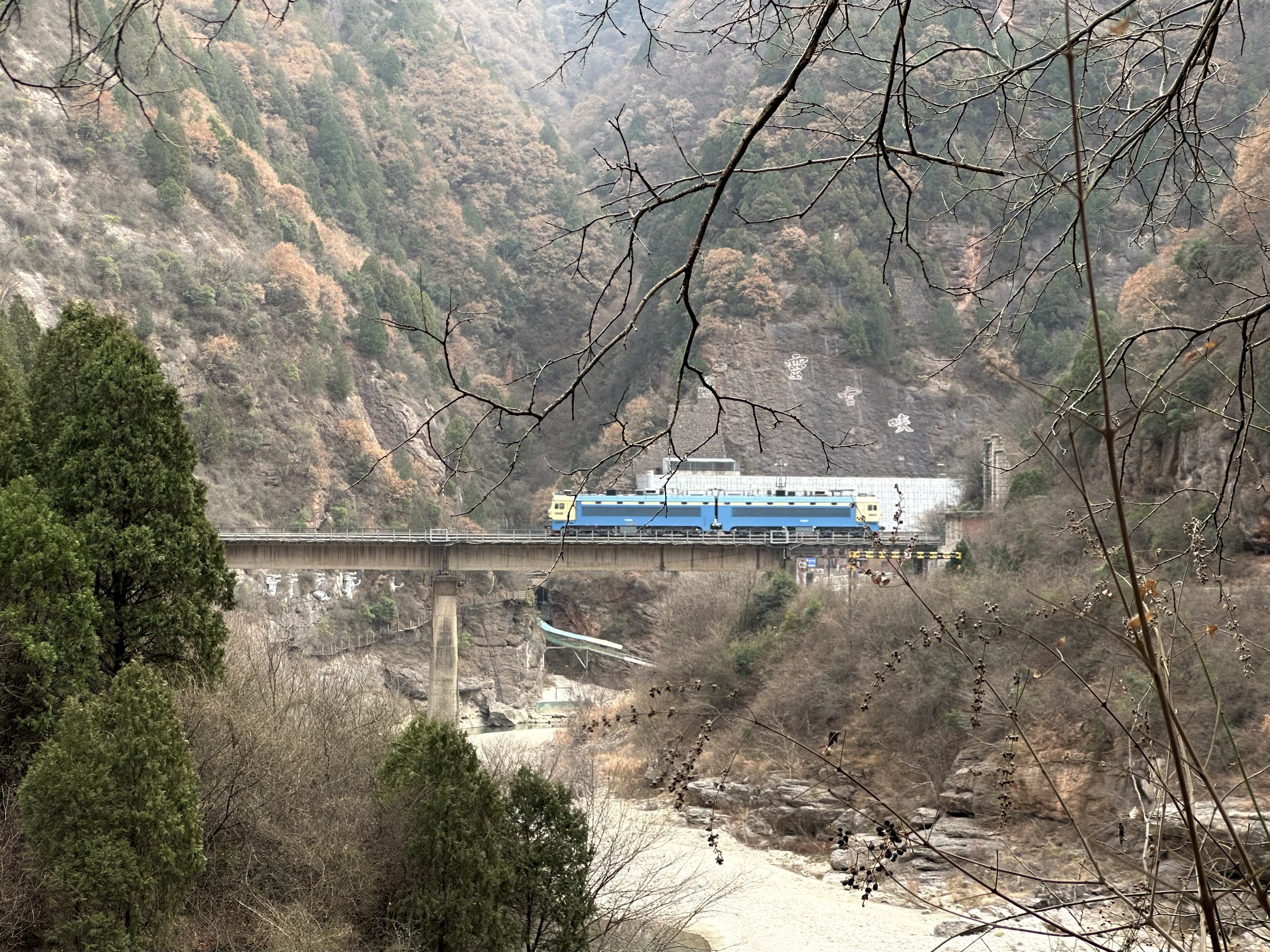
- A SS4 locomotive pair passing Bridge of Lingguanxia on Baoji–Chengdu railway above Jialing River

Overview
- Other name(s): Bao–Cheng railway, Bao–Cheng line
- Status: In operation
- Locale: China
- Termini: Baoji; Chengdu

Service
- Type: Heavy rail
- System: China Railway

History
- Opened: January 1, 1958
- Completed: July 12, 1956
- Electrified: July 1, 1975

Technical
- Line length: 676 km (420 mi)
- Track gauge: 1435 mm
- Minimum radius: less than 300 m (980 ft)
- Electrification: 50 Hz 25kV overhead
- Operating speed: 120 km/h (75 mph)

Chinese name
- Simplified Chinese: 宝鸡—成都铁路
- Traditional Chinese: 寶雞—成都鐵路
- Literal meaning: Baoji-Chengdu Railway
Transcriptions
Standard Mandarin
- Hanyu Pinyin: Bǎojī Chéngdū Tiělù
- Wade–Giles: Pao^{3}-chi^{1} Ch'eng^{2}-tu^{1} T'ieh^{3}-lu^{4}
- Yale Romanization: Bǎujī Chéngdū Tyělù
- IPA: [pàʊtɕí ʈʂʰə̌ŋtú tʰjèlû]

Bao-Cheng Railway
- Simplified Chinese: 宝成铁路
- Traditional Chinese: 寶成鐵路
- Literal meaning: Railway between Baoji and Chengdu
Transcriptions
Standard Mandarin
- Hanyu Pinyin: Bǎo Chéng Tiělù
- Wade–Giles: Pao^{3} Ch'eng^{2} T'ieh^{3}-lu^{4}
- Yale Romanization: Bǎu Chéng Tyělù
- IPA: [pàʊ ʈʂʰə̌ŋ tʰjèlû]

Bao-Cheng Line
- Simplified Chinese: 宝成线
- Traditional Chinese: 寶成線
- Literal meaning: Line between Baoji and Chengdu
Transcriptions
Standard Mandarin
- Hanyu Pinyin: Bǎo Chéng Xiàn
- Wade–Giles: Pao^{3} Ch'eng^{2} Hsien^{4}
- Yale Romanization: Bǎu Chéng Syàn
- IPA: [pàʊ ʈʂʰə̌ŋ ɕjɛ̂n]

The Baoji–Chengdu railway, Bao–Cheng railway or Bao–Cheng Line was formerly designed as a rail line that connects Tianshui and Chengdu called Tianshui–Chengdu railway (simplified Chinese: 天水—成都铁路; traditional Chinese: 天水—成都鐵路; pinyin: Tiānshuǐ Chéngdū Tiělù) or Tiancheng railway (simplified Chinese: 天成线; traditional Chinese: 天成線; pinyin: Tiān Chéng Xiàn). The line is a mixed single- and double-track, electrified, 676-kilometer (Note: The length of Bao-Cheng Line has not been precise till now. Some hold the idea that the rail line is 676 kilometers long while some hold estimations that the length should be approximately 668.2 kilometers, but others along with timetables in the late 1950s claimed that the line's length should be 669 km.) railroad in China between Baoji in Shaanxi province and Chengdu in Sichuan province. It is one of main lines that connects southwestern with northwestern China and a part of the Lanzhou–Kunming Corridor of the Eight Verticals.

The line finished construction on 12 July 1956, after which it began operating on 1 January 1958. The rail line is also the first one in China to be electrified. The Baoji–Guangyuan section of the line is under the control of China Railway Xi'an Group, while the rest is in charge of China Railway Chengdu Group. The railway was added to the List of China's Industrial Heritages for Conservation in January 2018.

== Line description ==
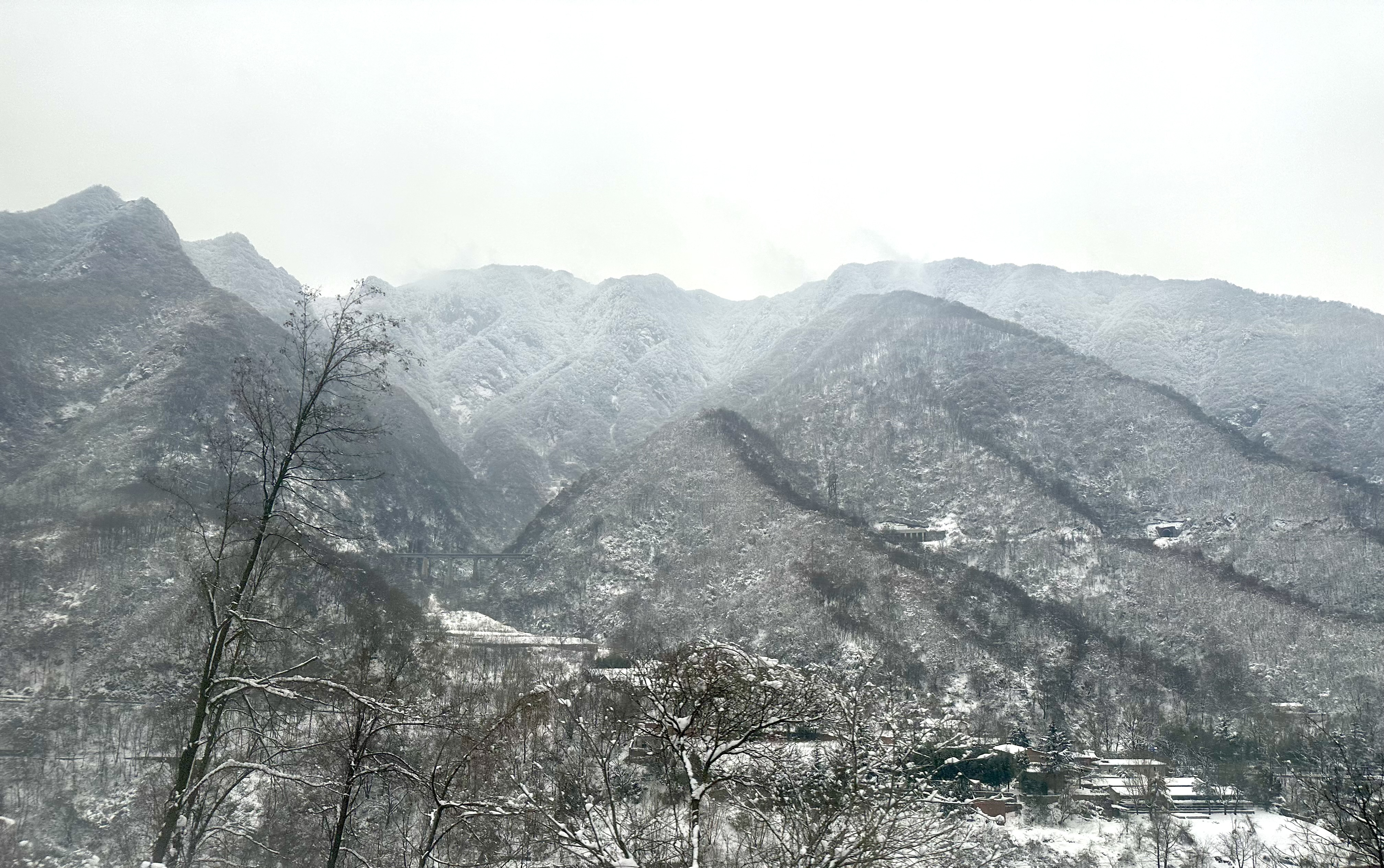
Guanyinshan Spiral

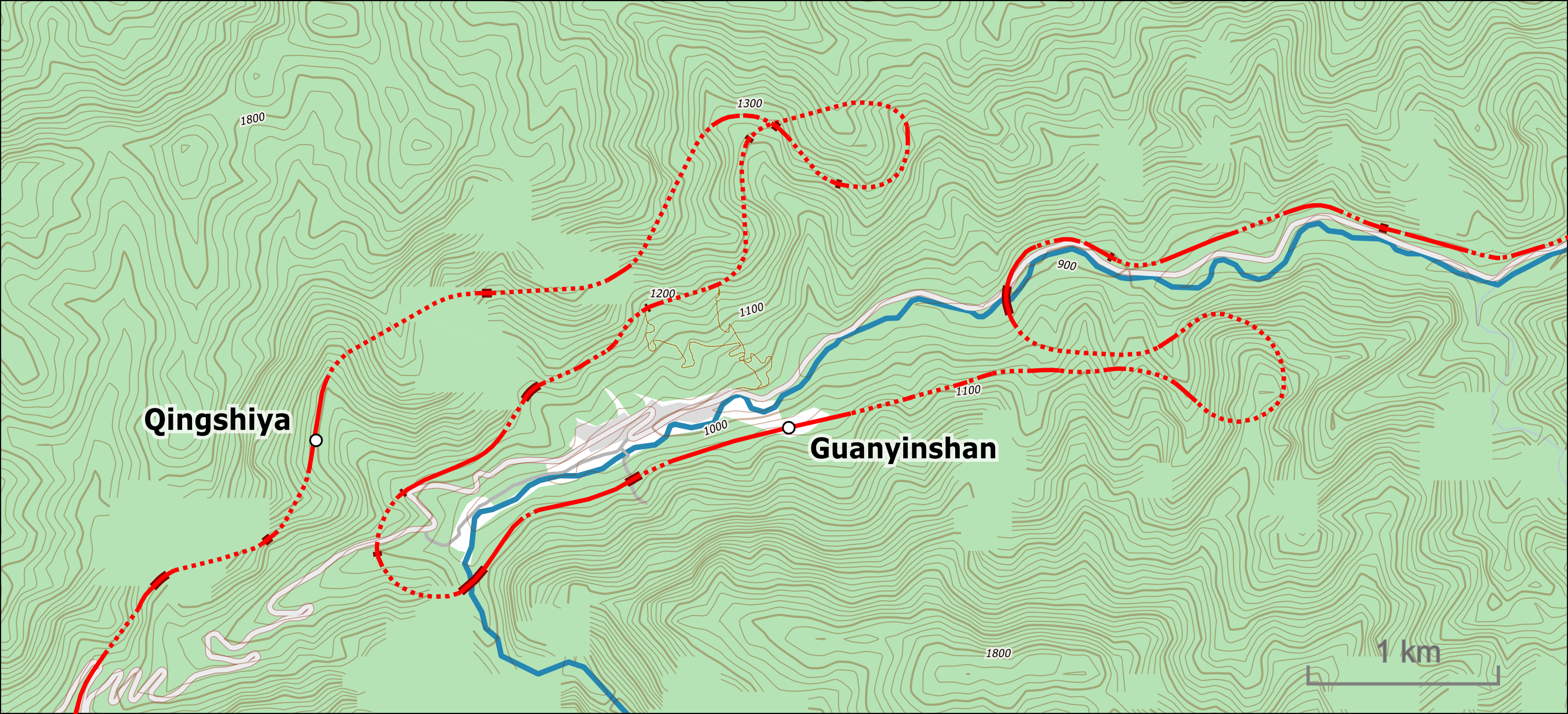
Map of the Guanyinshan Spiral

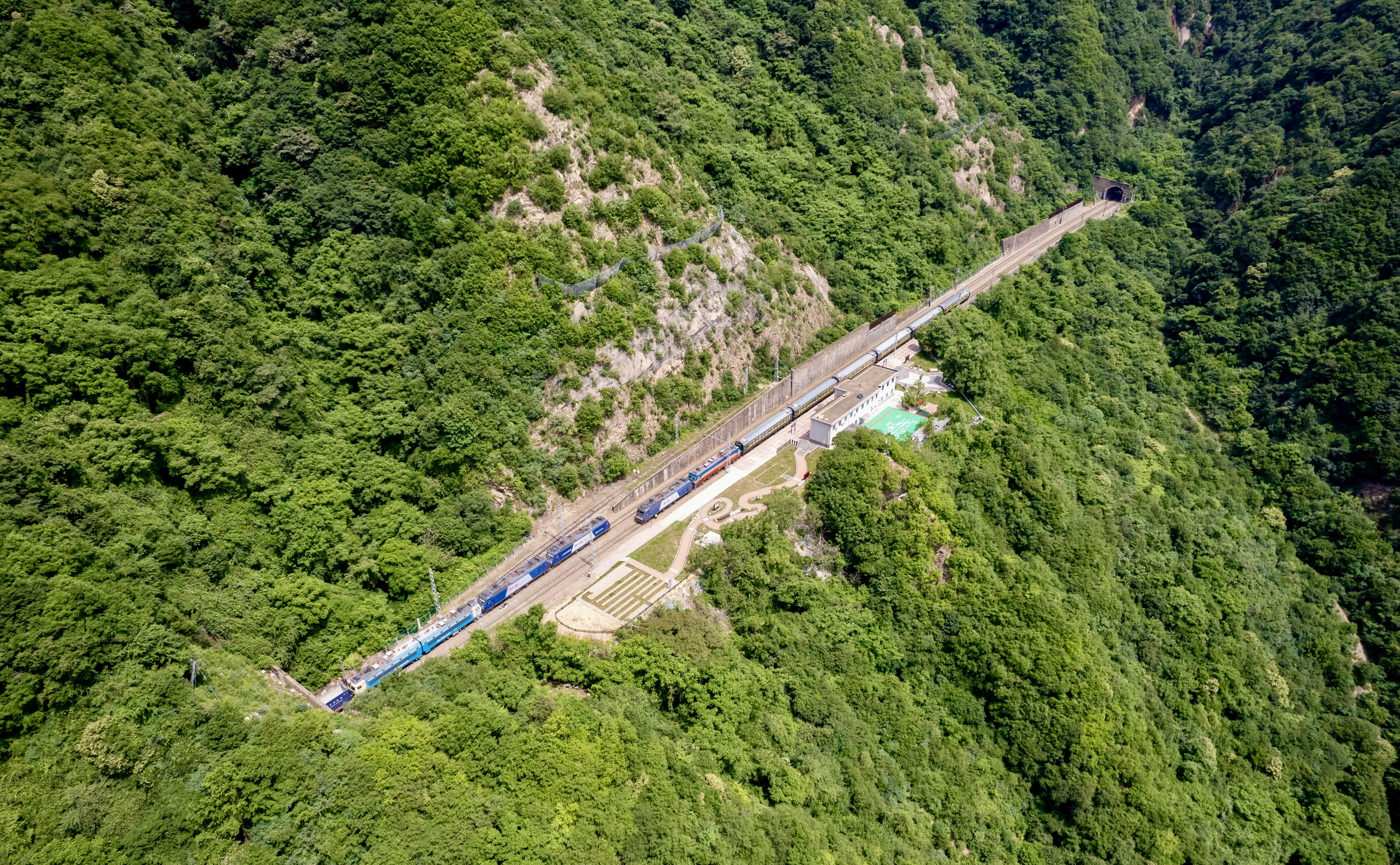
The HXD3 locomotive as bank engines in the Qingshiya railway station

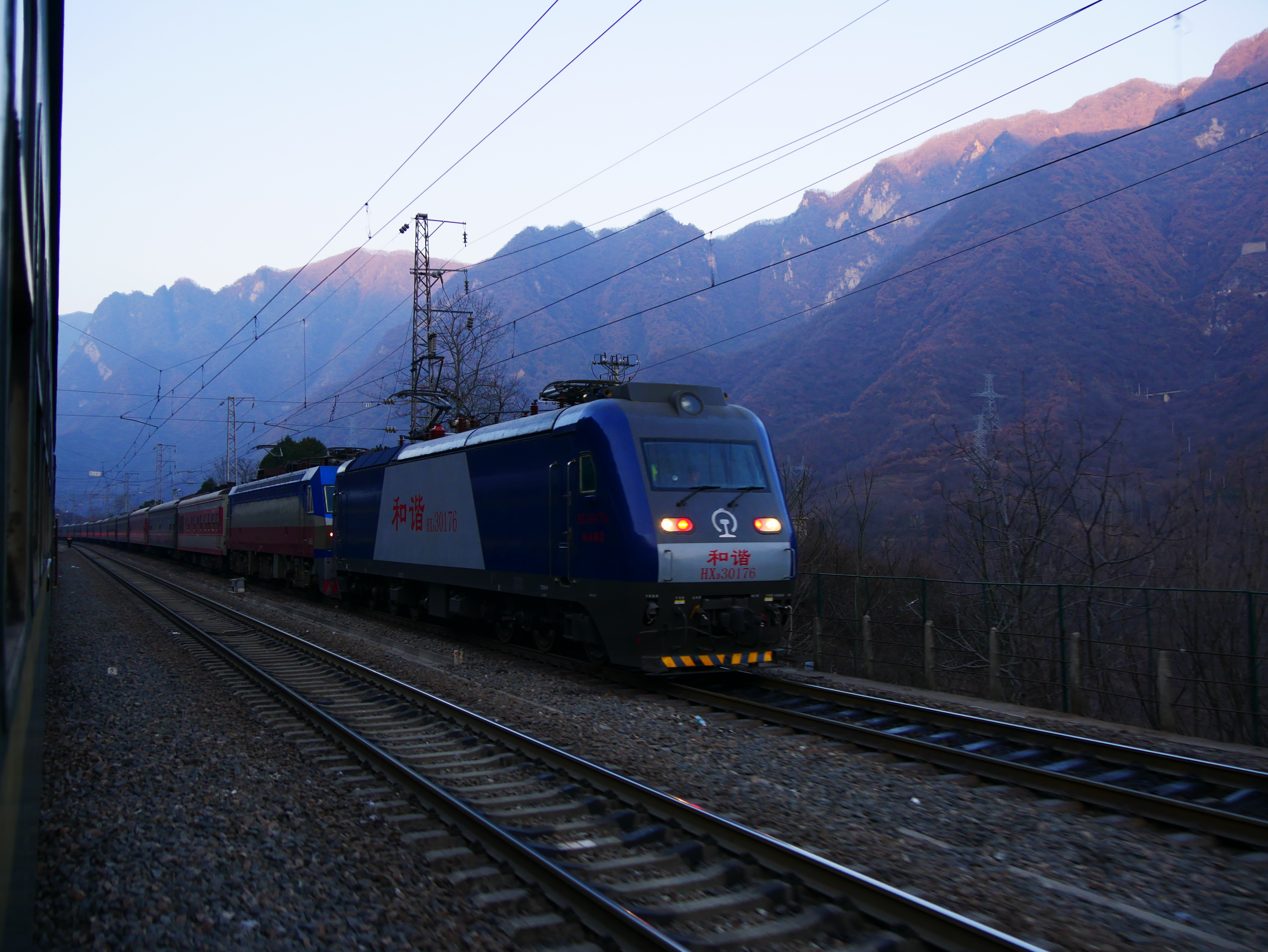
The HXD3 locomotive as bank engine in the Guanyinshan railway station

The Bao–Cheng Line runs southwards from Guanzhong Plain to Sichuan Basin and traverses the Qinling, Daba Mountains, and Jianmen after leaving Baoji. The rail line goes through 5 different zones of geological structures (including granite, quartzite, greenschist, conglomerate and slate); around 80% are in the mountainous area. The line stretches along the ancient roads and Qingjiang River after entering the Qin Mountains, as the track elevates with a slope of 30‰ in the Renjiawan–Yangjiawan section; the steepest section can reach 33‰. A spiral by 3 horseshoe-shaped tracks and a figure-8 one, which is stacked in 3 layers and raised up to 817 meters, allows the rail line to navigate topological difficulties.

To avoid the overheating of brakes during the downhill journey, Qingshiya Station was established in the spiral to make the locomotives cool down, as the station is also the highest and steepest station with the smallest radius throughout the line.

A 2363.6-meter-long tunnel brings the line to the Jialing River's drainage basin, after which the line starts its 12‰ downhill slope towards Guangyuan with 14 bridges across the river in Qinling–Lüeyang section. Overall, the line has 304 tunnels and 1,001 bridges, which collectively account for 17% of the total track length. The 4-kilometer Huilongchang Tunnel is the longest tunnel of the line. Additionally, the train is the first to-capital train for residents throughout southwestern China.

Additionally, the line features several sections where slopes are long and steep with multiple curves, especially the Baoji–Qinling section. The power of steam locomotives was so low that it had greatly degraded the line's transporting capabilities after the line's operation began; the Guanyinshan Spiral took trains almost the same time to pass as pedestrians. Therefore, the line was listed high on the agenda for rail electrification.

The line finished electrification in 1976 and has been using electric locomotives since. Bank engines are still employed to secure the abundant power during the mountain climb and brakes for downhill journeys in Baoji–Qinling section with the help of HXD3 locomotives: one for passenger coaches and two for freight coaches. (Note: Freight coaches with a total weight of no more than 1800 tons only need 1 single locomotive as bank engine.) The aggregate weight of trains to climb the mountains is limited to no more than 3000 tons and 2600 tons for the downhill ones.

The line began its construction for another track in 1993; the double-track section came into operation on 26 December 1999. The rail tracks succeeded in making cities along the line into core regions of the Third Front and played a key role in the fundamental supplies for the cities within the plan. Later, the opening of the Xi'an–Chengdu Highspeed Railway on 6 December 2017 made the number of passenger trains on the line beginning at Baoji decrease to roughly 20.

In Baoji, the line meets the Longhai railway, on which trains can travel east to Xi'an and the Central Plains or west to Lanzhou and the northwest, and Baoji–Zhongchuan railway. At Yangpingguan, the line intersects with the Yang'an railway which branches eastward along the Han River Valley. In Chengdu, the line connects with the Chengyu Line to Chongqing, the Chengqian Line to Guizhou, and the Chengkun Line to Kunming. The line meets Xi'an–Chengdu Highspeed Railway and Lanzhou–Chongqing railway in Guangyuan.

== History ==
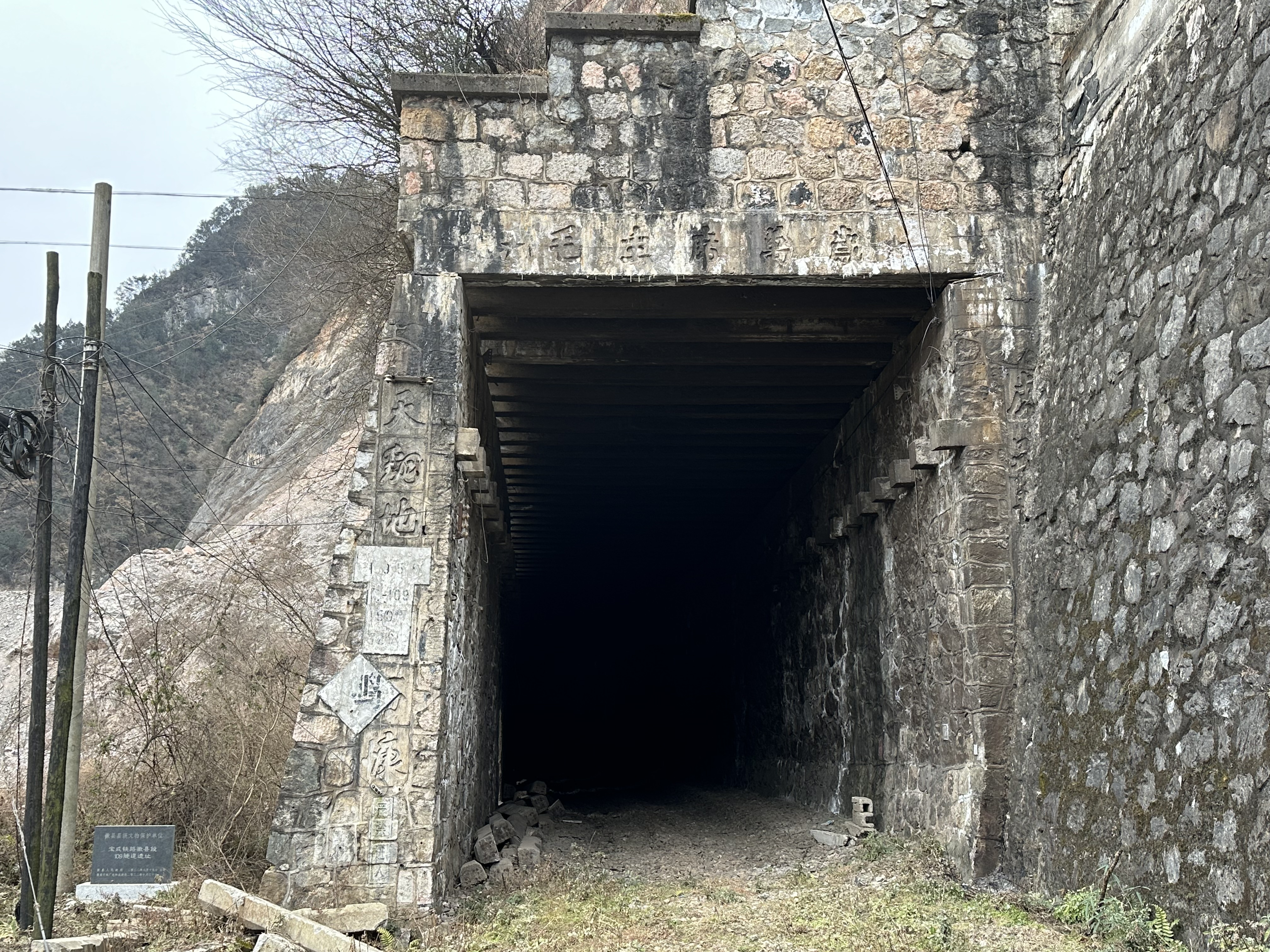
The slogan "Long Live Chairman Mao" is engraved on the arch at the north entrance of the Tunnel 109 built in 1956, as both sides of the entrance are engraved two lines from Mao Zedong's poem Seven-Character Verse: The People's Liberation Army Occupies Nanjing which says: "The tigers and dragons are more powerful today than in the past, and the world is turned upside down and the world is changed with great enthusiasm"

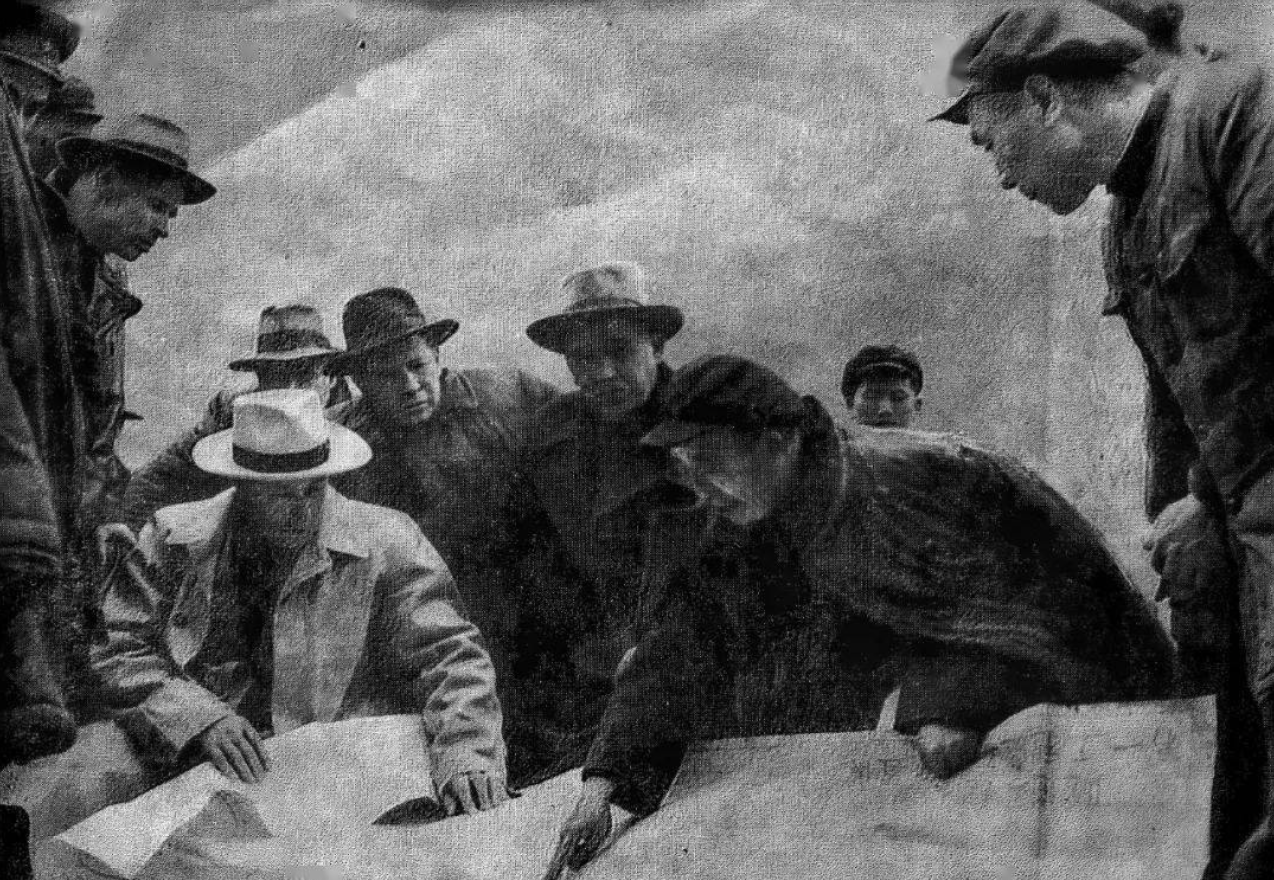
Teng Daiyuan and the Soviet experts at the construction site of Qingshiya in 1955

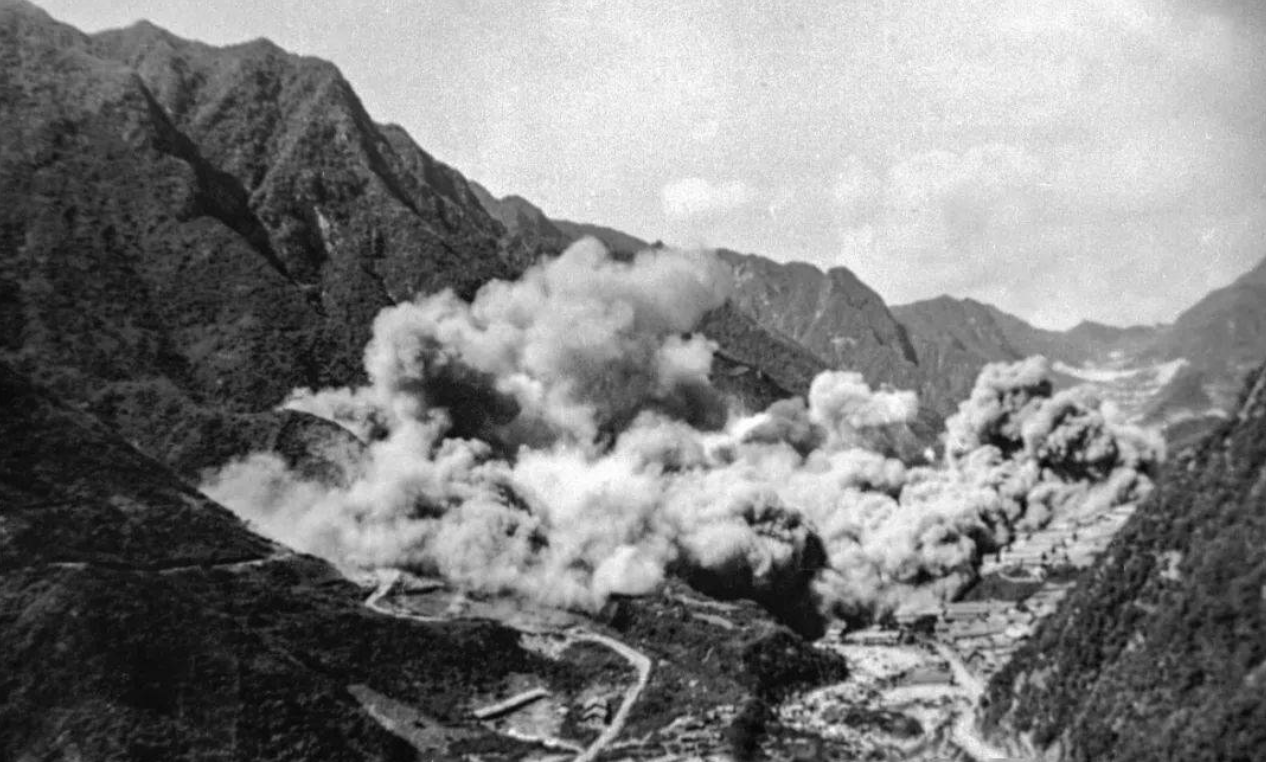
The Guanyinshan grand blastings on 10 August 1955

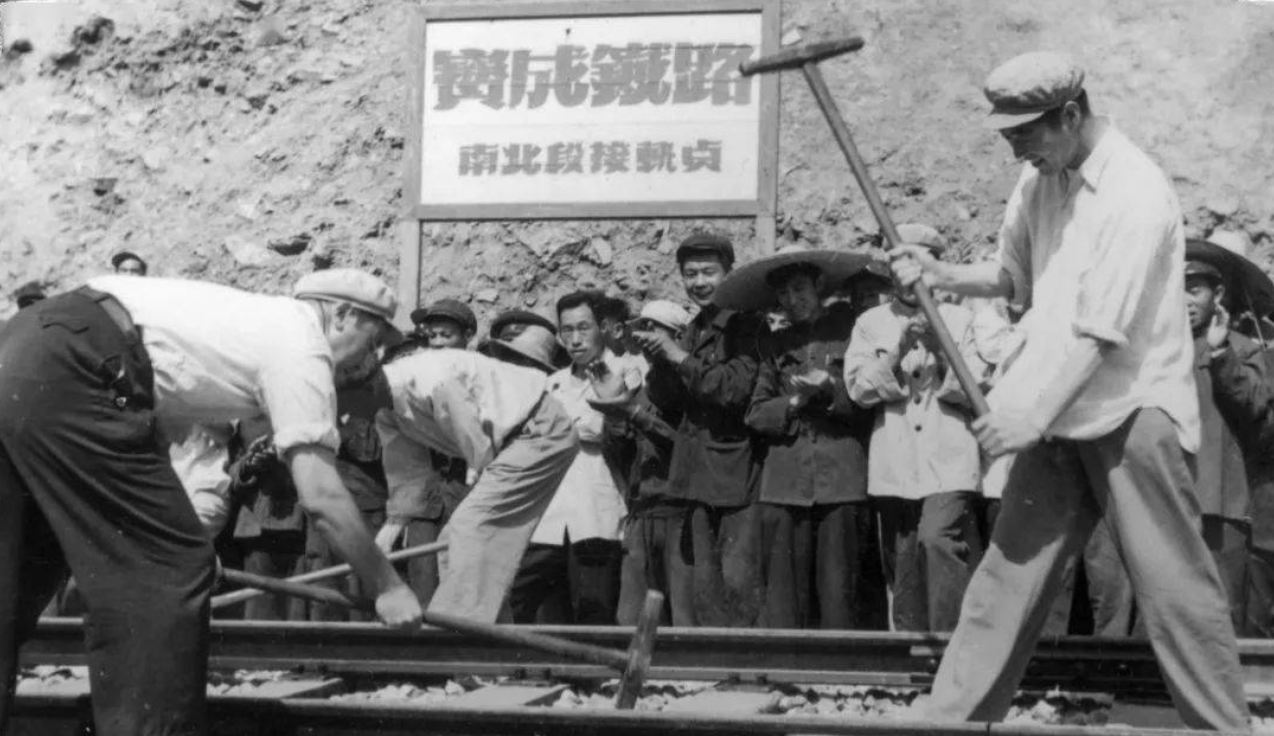
Workers from both the south and the north working near the connection point

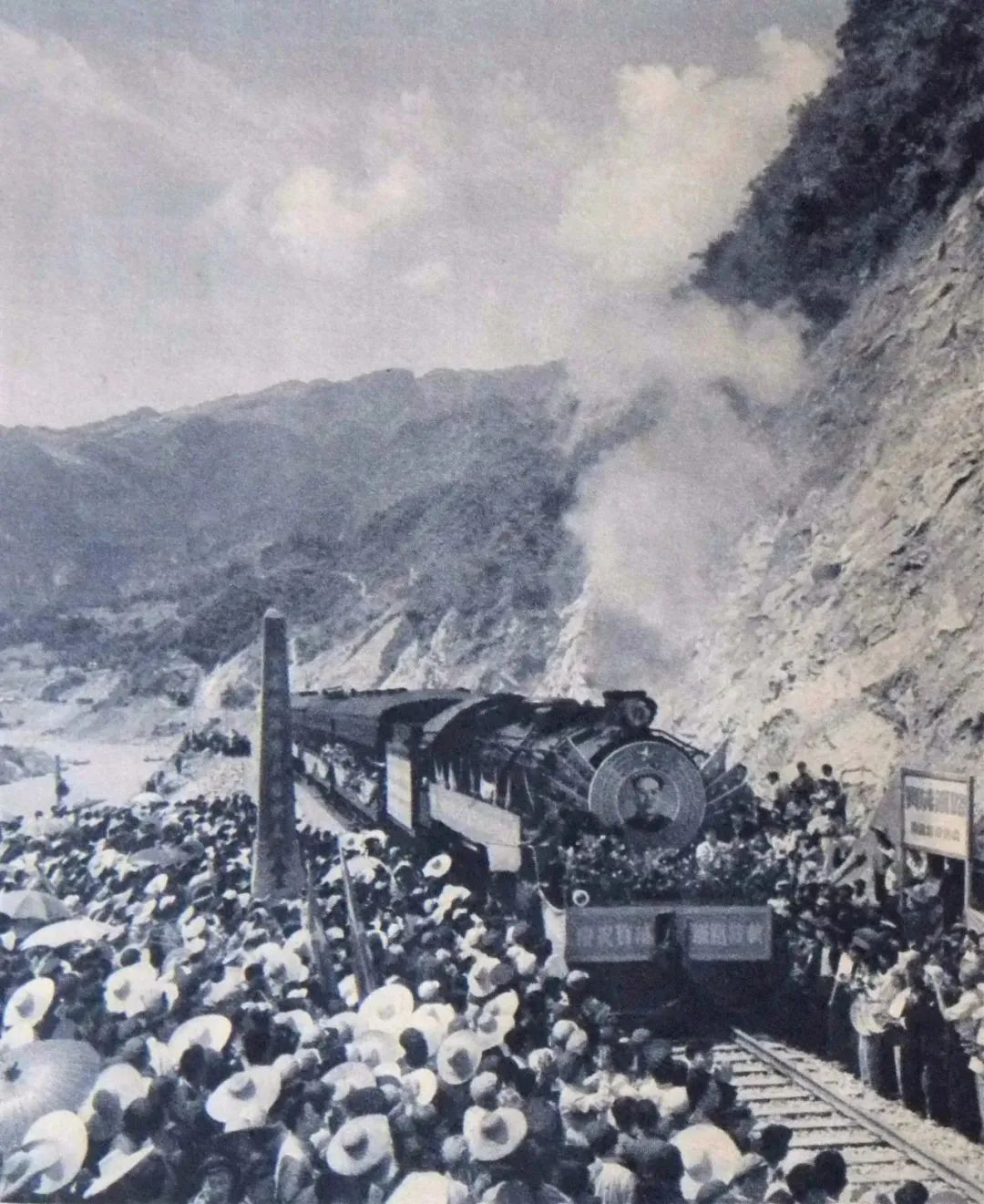
The line connection finished in July 1956; a monument was erected at the connection point

=== Construction ===
The Bao–Cheng line was originally proposed in Sun Yat-sen's 1913 China National Railway Plan as part of the Datong–Chengdu railway. However, it wasn't implemented back then due to the oversized scale.

The Beiyang government later suggested schemes regarding a rail line that connected Tianshui with Chengdu in 1920. The aerial topographical surveys for the line's section in Shaanxi Province were conducted by the project group in 1936, which was followed by 1940 and 1947 surveys. However, the blueprint was still not put into practice.The PRC Ministry of Railways (MOR) managed to conduct further surveys for the Tianshui–Lüeyang section of the 1920 scheme along with a brand-new Baoji–Lüeyang one with the assistance of experts from Soviet Union, after which the new one was selected following comparisons of the geological and transportation network conditions with the former one. Construction of the line was added to the first five-year plan afterwards.

Construction began in Chengdu on 1 July 1952, when Mao Zedong instructed, during the opening ceremony of Chengdu–Chongqing railway, to "keep going on to turn the Tianshui–Chengdu railway into real". The construction throughout Sichuan then began in 1953; track-laying work started from south to north at the Chengdu end in April. The construction featured the technological assistance of over 30 Soviet experts, along with two Hungarian experts, as well as material supplies from residents along the line. The maximum number of workers involved reached 140 thousand during the construction. The line got renamed to the Baoji–Chengdu Railway on 1 December 1952, and construction in Shaanxi Province started from Baoji in January 1954. On 10 August 1955, under the guidance of Soviet experts, China Railway successfully carried out the grand blastings for Guanyinshan Station, which became the first successful large-scale blasting throughout the history of China's railway construction. The line was connected on 12 July 1956 in Huangshahe Village of Huixian County, Longnan, 13 months ahead of schedule, and opened on 1 January 1958. Steam locomotives were employed thereafter.

=== Electrification ===
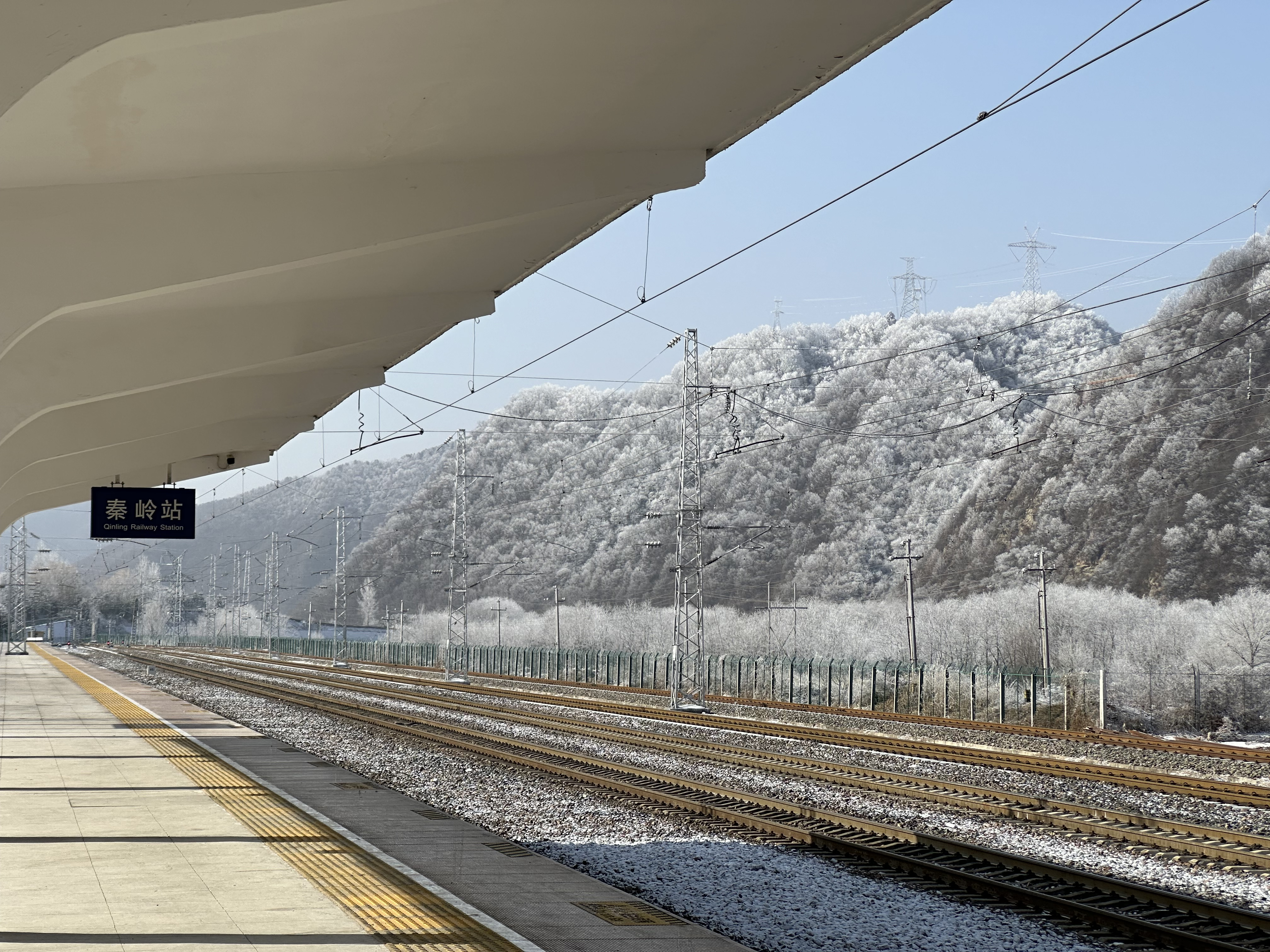
Overhead catenary in Qinling railway station

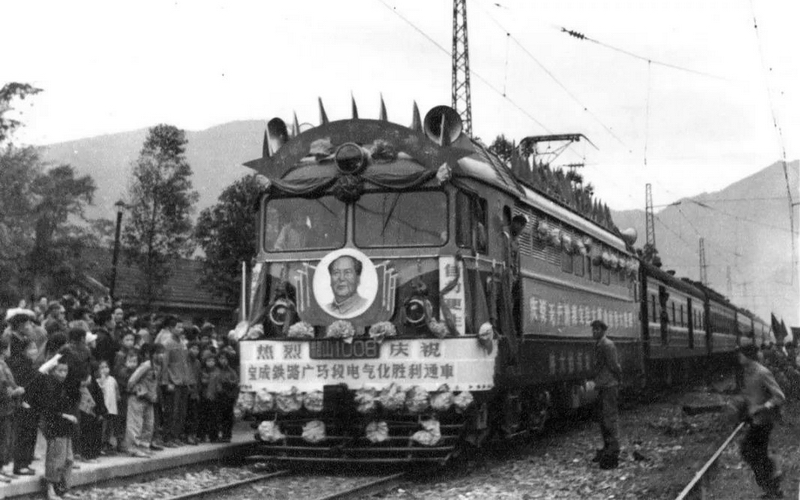
SS1008 locomotive was the first renamed 6Y1 electrified pusher and employed by Majiaoba Depot after the depot's electrification completed in 1969

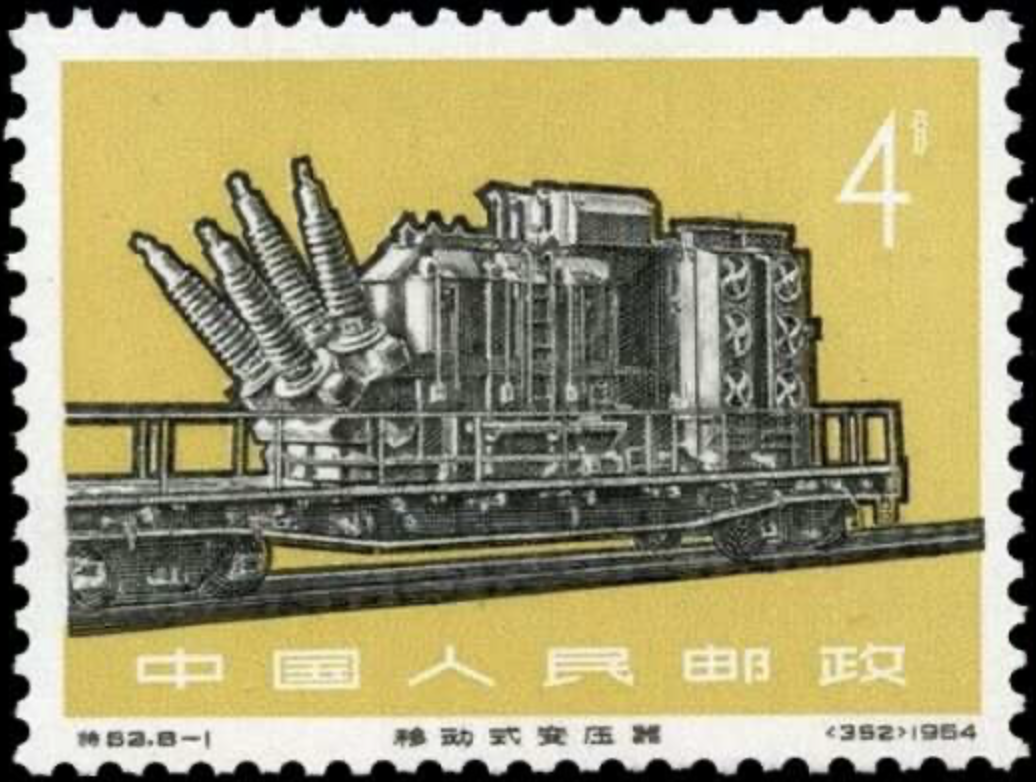
A stamp issued in 1966 that features the mobile transformer adopted by Baoji–Chengdu Railway

Preparations for the electrification project of Baoji–Chengdu railway began in 1953. The MOR initially set the catenary to 3 kV DC and submitted the plan to the Soviet counterparts for evaluations in June 1955, but in April 1957, it was determined that single-phase electric power of 25 kV with utility frequency should be employed after learning that other countries had been using this upgraded style. The project was re-schemed soon after.

The new design was reevaluated by Moscow in May 1958 and put into practice after the agreement in June. Engineers decided to reduce the demanded amount of transformers from six to four for substations due to lack of key ingredients for silicon steel and high prices for imports resulting from technological denials from the Western countries. Of the transformers, three were implemented in the substations, and one was placed on a flat wagon that travels among the three substations. The decision gave birth to China's first mobile transformer in 1965.

MOR kept insisting that electric locomotives should adopt both domestic and foreign production lines, as the domestic 6Y1 prototype of the Shaoshan series began its experimental run in the 1960s, and 25 imported 6Y2 locomotives arrived at ports of mainland China. Later, they became the major type of locomotives after the electrification in Baoji–Fengzhou section finished in 1961. The other four sections finished their electrifications respectively afterward before 1 July 1975 when the ceremony of celebration took place. The electrification upgraded the line's maximum speed to 80 km/h; Further improvements on the shape and flexibility of cables were made around 1978.

The HXD locomotive series was officially employed on the rail line after the 2008 Sichuan earthquake, leading to faster freight transportation with the help of new high-powered locomotives. Substations were gradually replaced by SCADA for smart and automatic controls to ensure continuous and abundant electricity.

=== Remediation ===
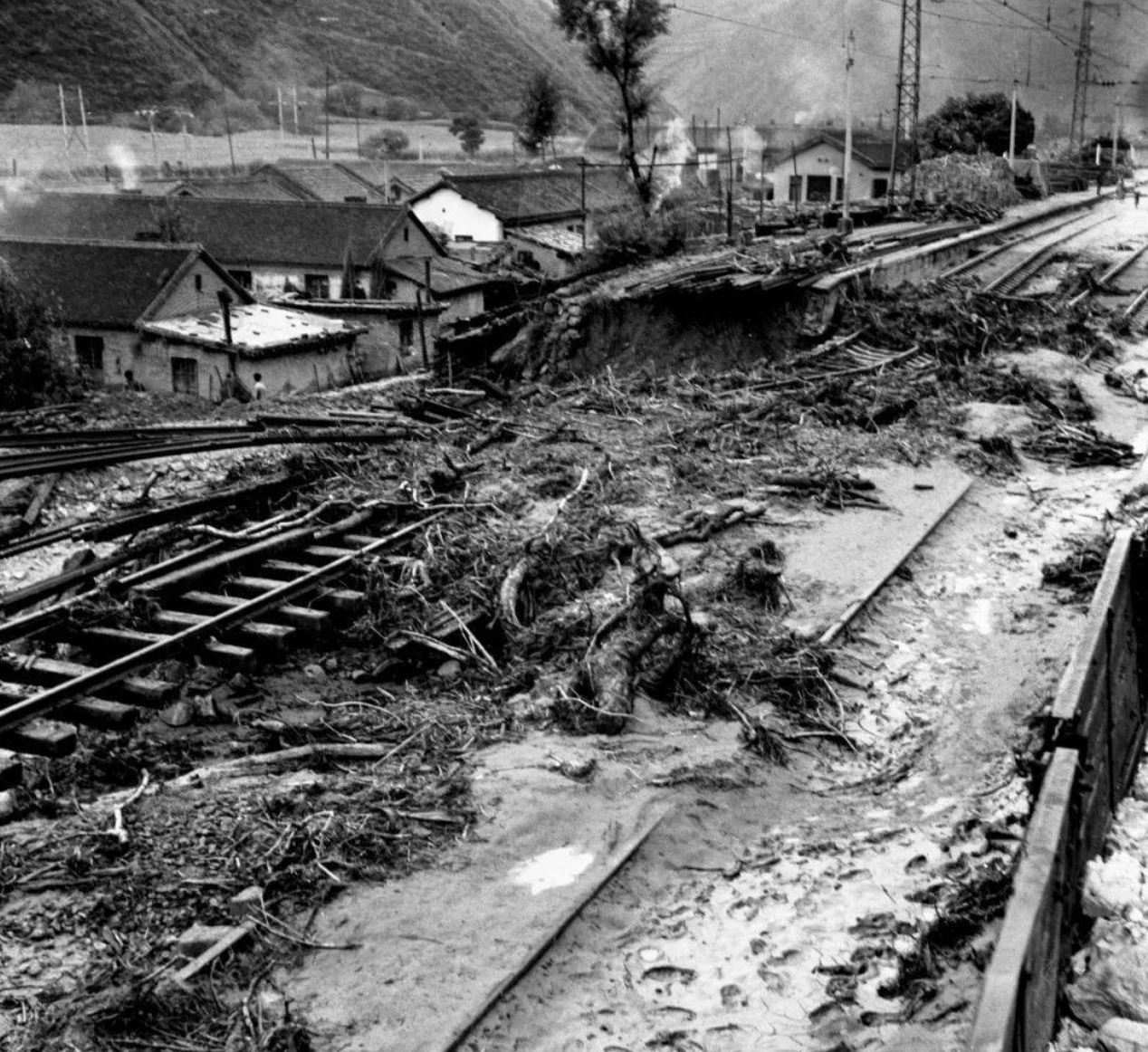
The rail line's track destroyed by the flood in 1981

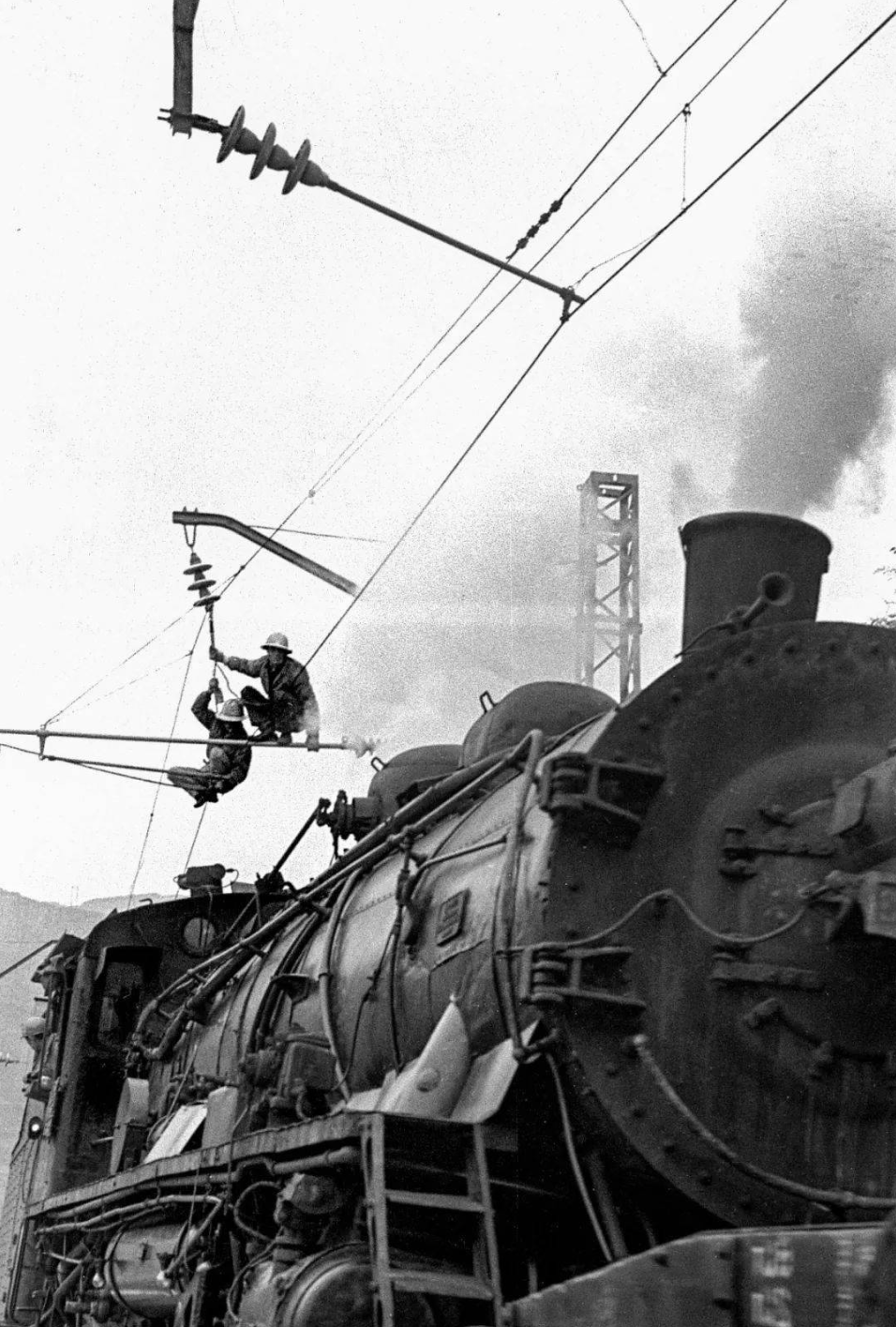
Workers re-implementing wires for the flood-destroyed section of the line in 1982

MOR established an expert group to investigate the frequent landslides on the line in 1955. Three tunnels of a total length of 1,439 meters and 10 culverts of 657 meters had been built in Sichuan late 1957 to improve situation.

Xi'an Group, Chengdu Group, and Lanzhou Group of MOR, in line with the principle of "opening first and then consolidating, taking care of the future", took measures to restore and reinforce the damaged bridges and roadbeds along the line after the 1981 flood. Over 15,000 workers were enlisted for the effort.

=== Transformation ===
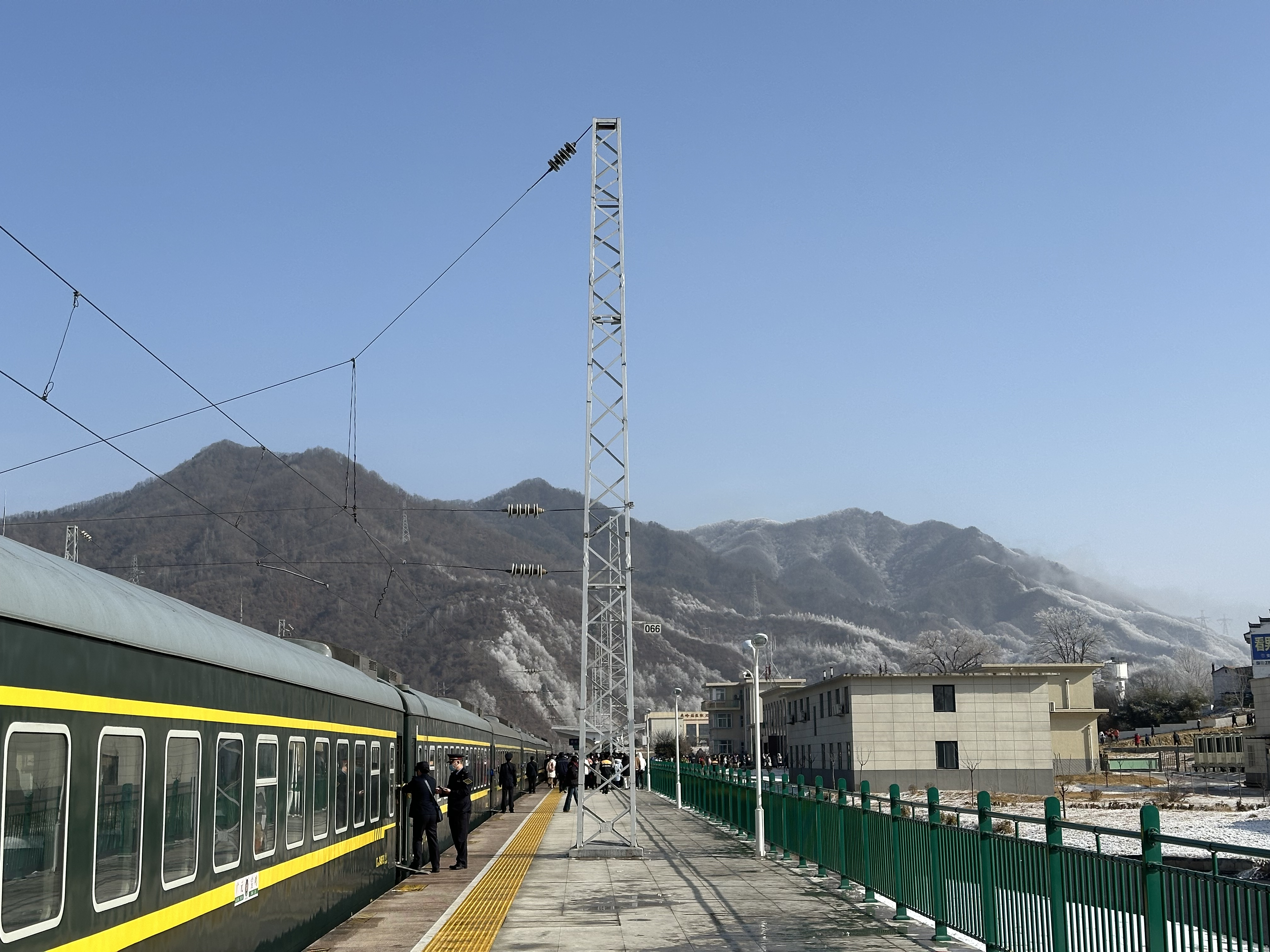
Crowds at Qinling railway station on vacation days

MOR decided to divert the high-slope section with limited capacity between Luomiaozhen and Majiaoba in December 1959. The diversion began on 15 February 1960 and was suspended in April 1962. The project restarted in November 1964 and finished in September 1969. Several large-scale capacity improvements were then made later on to meet the demands of economic growth and social development.

Another upgrade was made in September 1990 between Guangyuan and Majiaoba on the automatic block signaling of axle counters, making the punctuality increase by 3.9 percent for freight trains and 0.3 percent for passenger trains. The line then completed its heavy rail upgrade in 1993, the year when the second track's construction started. The second track lies on the rail line's Yangpingguan–Chengdu section, and capacity was greatly improved after its finish on 26 December 1999. The second track in the Yangpingguan–Qingbaijiang section is also the first additional in-mountains track among China's electrified railway lines. From 2008 to 2009, the line completed a seamless transformation; in 2014, the line once again upgraded the profiles and ties on the small radius curve of the main line.

In 2021, the Sichuan government issued a plan regarding the provincial multi-layer rail transit system and mentioned that a total length of 24.1 kilometers, as well as 10 stations on the Baoji–Chengdu Railway, would be transformed to fit for a metro-styled operation, with trains traveling with smaller coaches but shorter intervals. The plan also mentioned that the maximum speed of the line's Chengdu–Qingbaijiang section would be increased to 160 km/h as a result of transformation. A few years later, China Railway issued a call for a new wave of capacity improvements on 30 May 2024.

== Temporary operations ==
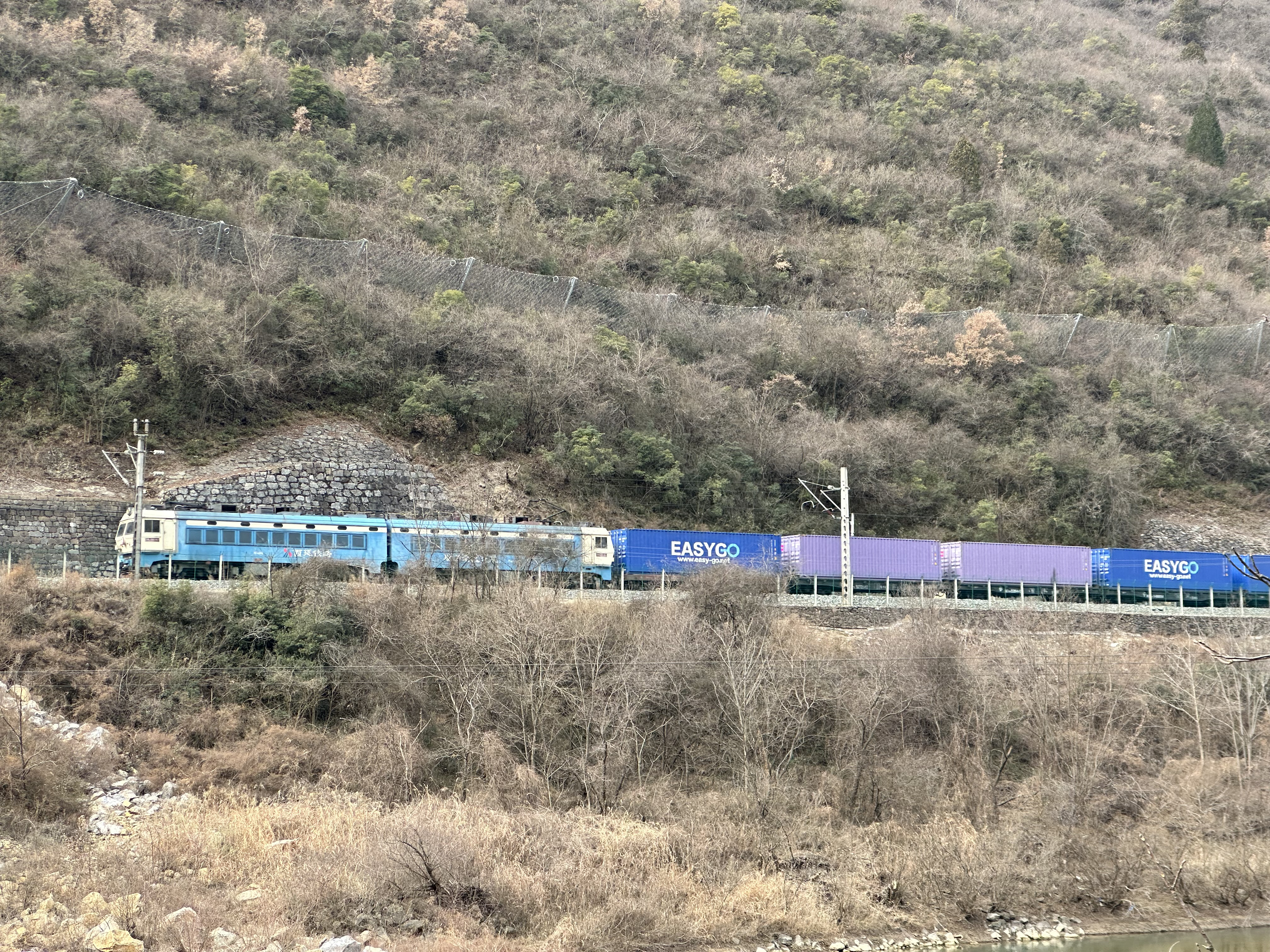
Freight trains going southward on Baoji–Chengdu railway

The Huixian–Chengdu section of the line was once separated into 4 parts for temporary operations, of which the Chengdu–Mianyang section began in October 1953, the Mianyang–Zhongba (Note: Zhongba railway station now has been renamed to Jiangyou railway station.) section began in February 1954, the Zhongba–Guangyuan section began in February 1955, and the rest began in October 1956.

The temporary operation phase mainly focused on deliveries for construction-related materials, and some passengers were also allowed to ride: A total of 2.75 million tons of road materials, along with 2.42 million tons of local materials and 3.02 million passengers, were delivered before the 1958 official openings. The temporary operations also made the line critical for goods and passengers to leave and enter Sichuan Basin in June 1956 when service of roadways had been dropped due to the 19-day storm season. The 1957 urgent food transmission from Sichuan, which was called by the State Council, also involved the Bao–Cheng Line by delivering 800 thousand tons of grains.

The official operations of the Chengdu–Guangyuan section began in January 1955; the Guangyuan–Mianyang section was consigned in October. In January 1958, the Guangyuan–Fengzhou section of the line began officially operating, thus marking the end of the temporary operation period of the Baoji–Chengdu railway.

== Acceptance check ==
Baoji–Chengdu Railway was assessed as a "qualified and good project" after the National Acceptance Committee's check during the stage of temporary operations. The committee also noted that the line featured a short duration of construction, low costs, high rate of handing over fixed assets, and a quick comeback for the previous investments.

Initially, the Chengdu Group and Zhengzhou Group took control of the line. The Fengzhou–Shangxiba (Note: Shangxiba railway station has been renamed as Guangyuan railway station now.) section of the line was given to the Xi'an Group for control after it was separated from Zhengzhou Group in September 1958. The section was then given back to Zhengzhou after Zhengzhou Group got reunified and was given to Xi'an Group again after Xi'an Group's independence on 18 March 2005.

== Opening ceremonies ==
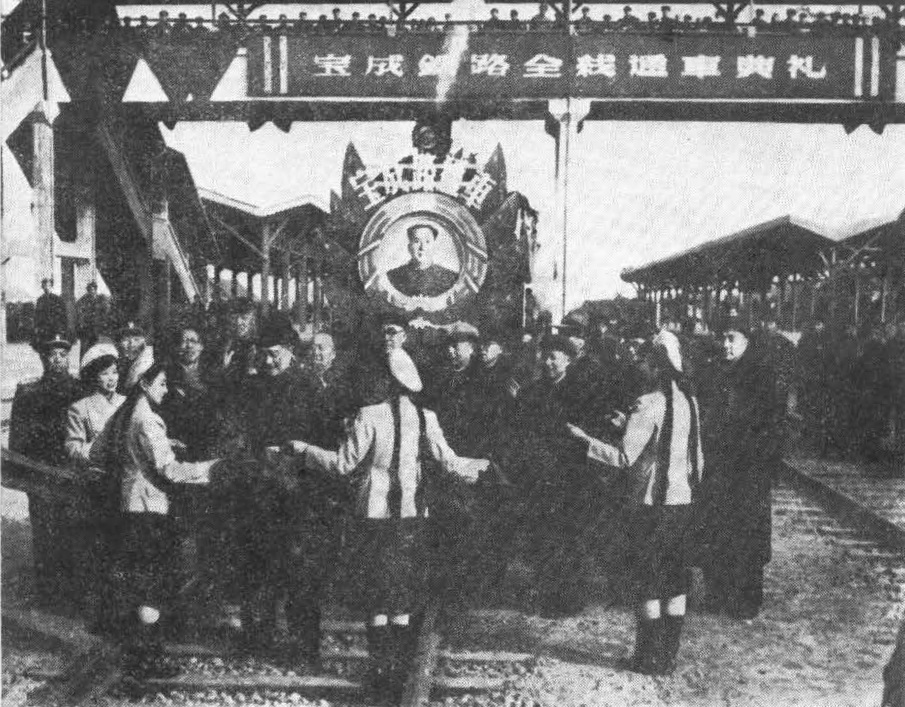
He Long in the 1958 opening ceremony

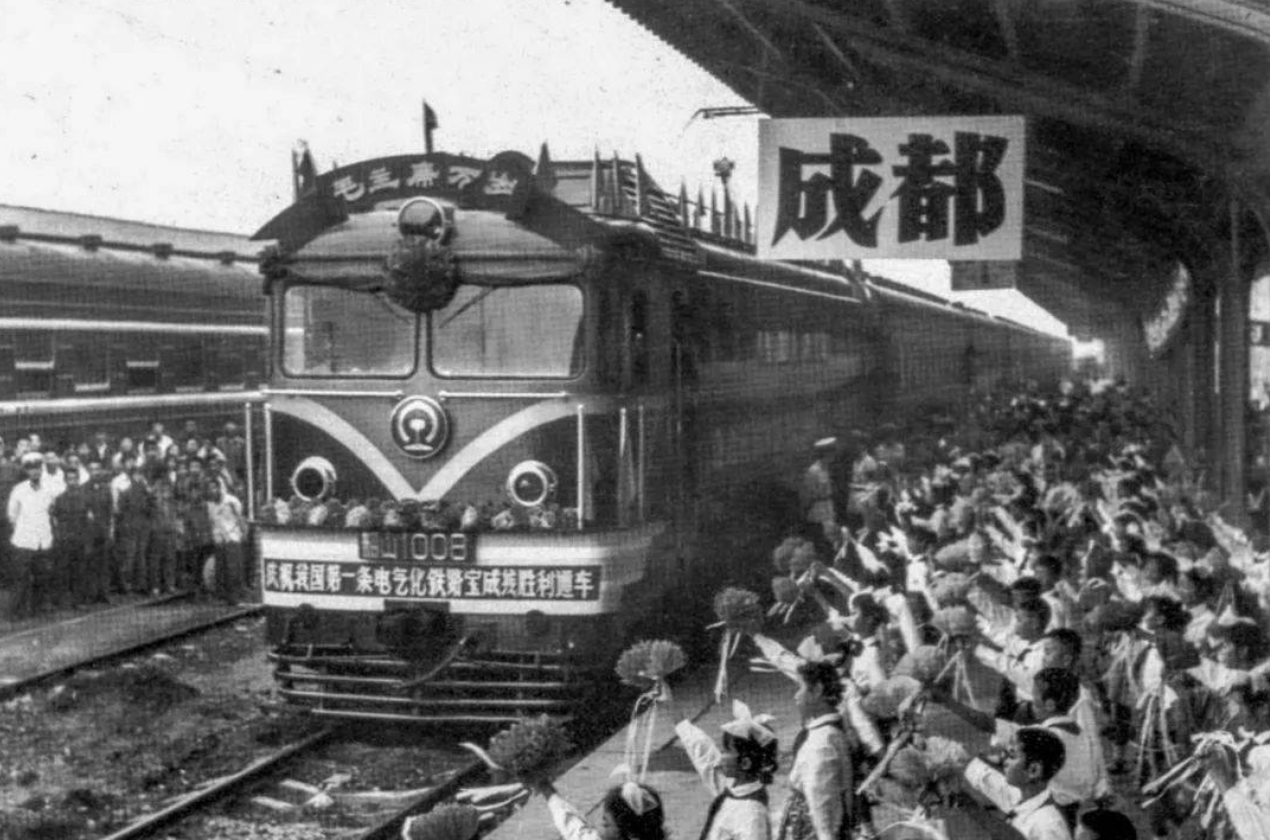
SS1008 locomotive at the 1975 ceremony of the line's electrification

Opening ceremonies of the Chengdu–Mianyang and Mianyang–Guangyuan sections took place already on 1 October 1953 and 1 January 1955 respectively, which was followed by a 1956 ceremony for the Guangyuan–Lüeyang section on the New Year's Day.

The official opening ceremony of the whole line took place at 2 p.m. in Chengdu railway station on New Year's Day of 1958. He Long, Nie Rongzhen, Kang Sheng, Teng Daiyuan, Huang Kecheng, and other political figures in mainland China, along with the vice minister of Union of Burma, attended the ceremony, while Radio Moscow and major radio broadcasts in China conducted interviews and reports that day. He started the ceremony with a speech, which was followed by ones from Teng; Zhao Shoushan, the governor of Shaanxi Province; Huang Zhengqing, the vice governor of Gansu Province; Li Dazhang, the governor of Sichuan Province; and Peskunov, the representative of Soviet experts and other workers. A ribbon cutting happened at 3 p.m., after which an express train left Chengdu for Beijing at 4 p.m., thus marking the opening of the Bao–Cheng Railway.

Another ceremony was held to celebrate the finish of the line's electrification on 1 July 1975 in Chengdu railway station. The SS1008 locomotive was shown at the ceremony.

== Incidents ==
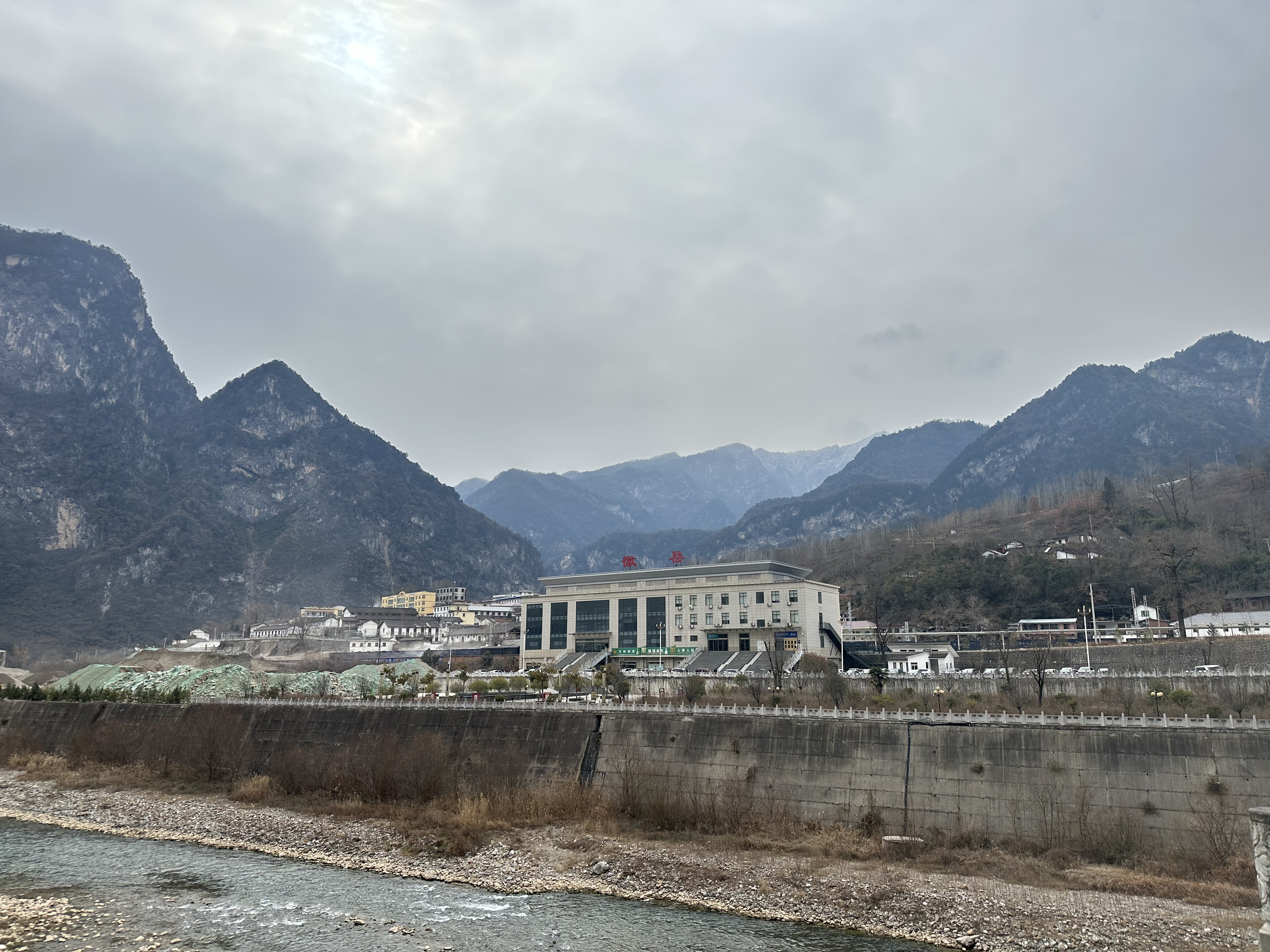
Huixian railway station surrounded by the Jialing River together with the Qin Mountains

Two fugitives wanted for homicide fled from Guangxi on 10 May 1987 and hijacked a taxi in Baoji to enter Guanyinshan railway station on 20 May. A police officer in the station, along with station operators, found them and brought them back to the duty room. However, the two criminals suddenly shot the three in-station workers and fled into the mountains. Public Security Bureau in Shaanxi made immediate urgent plans after receiving the call of help and asked for assistance from counterparts in Sichuan and Gansu. The two were eventually arrested at 3.45 p.m. on 22 May in Baoji.

China Railway Xi'an Group intended to preserve only two trains on the line after the storms in July 2018 in search of stabilities and securities for trains' service, but it soon received complaints from residents in the Gansu and Shaanxi Provinces. Xi'an then decided to withdraw by recovering operations of six more trains on the line but instructed that all passenger trains must pass the Yangpingguan–Lüeyang section before sundown.

== Accidents ==
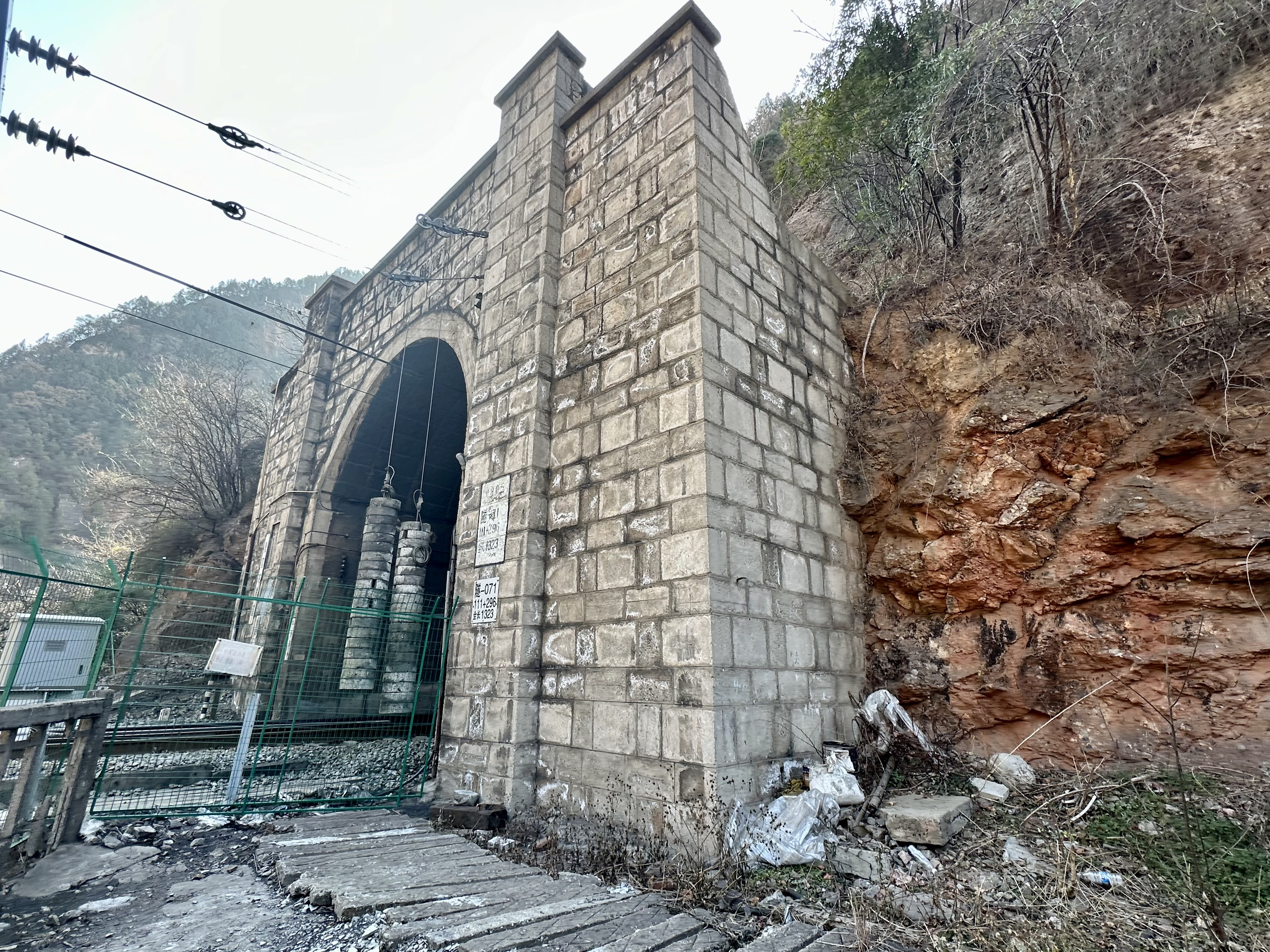
Tunnel 71 was built in 1985 due to the line change after flood in early 1980s

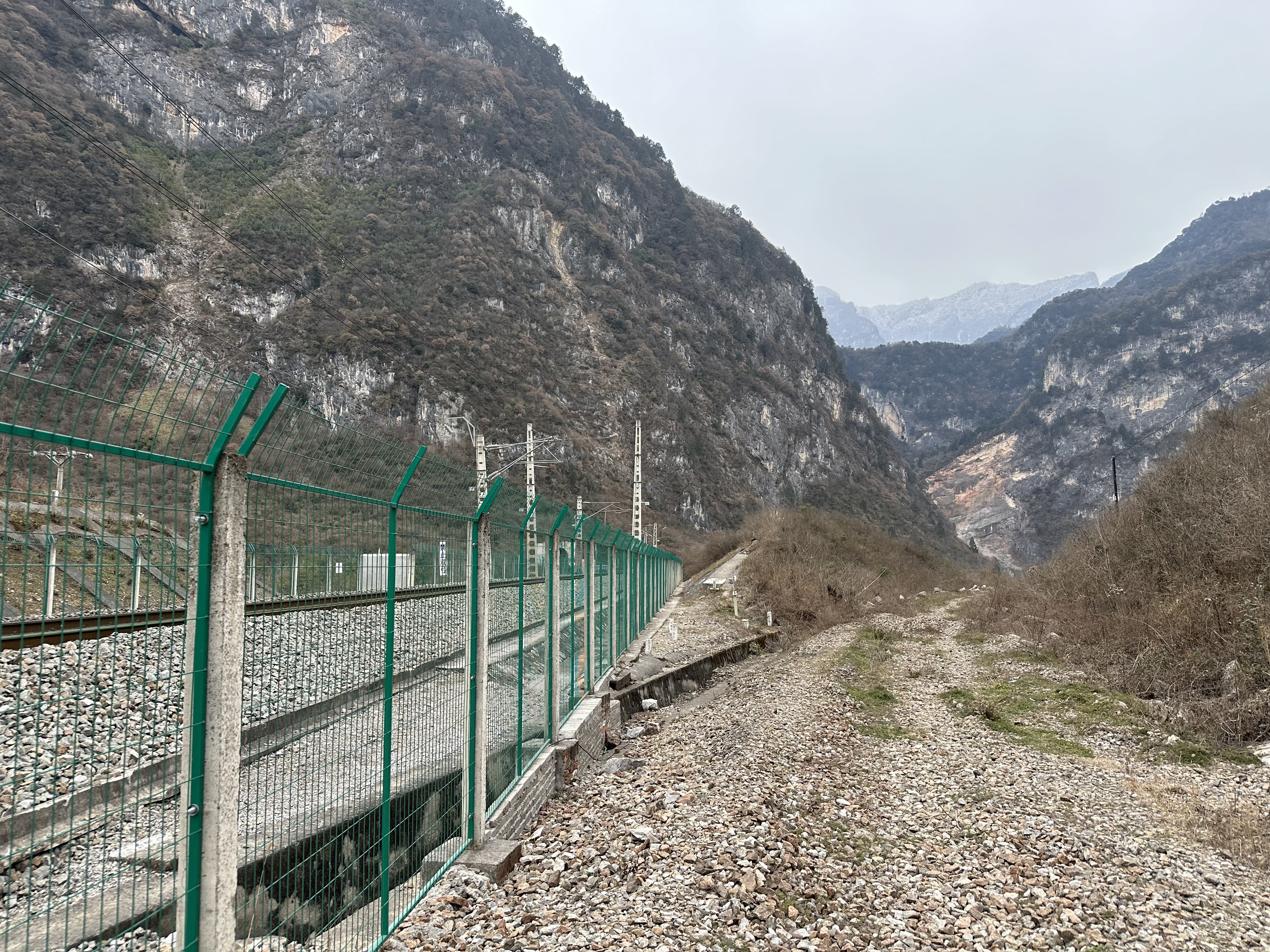
The railroad switched to the new Tunnel 109; the railroad to the old tunnel was removed

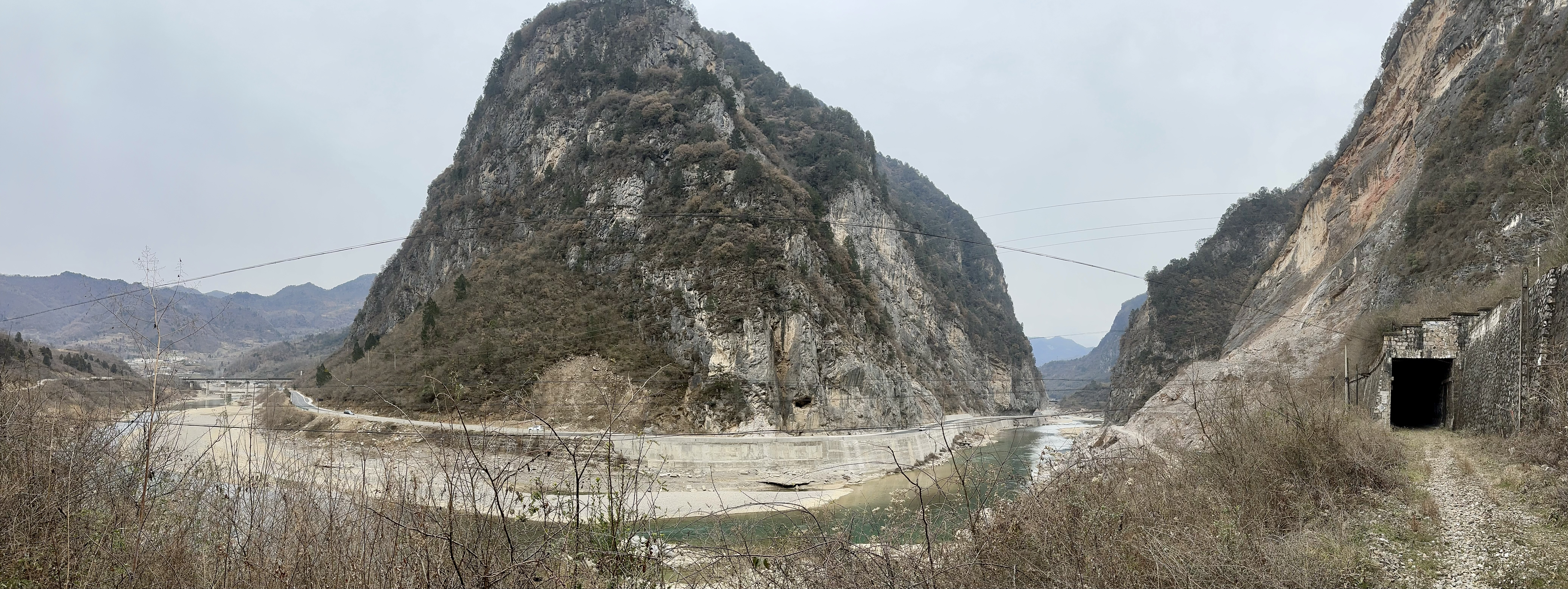
The position of the former Tunnel 109 and the new one

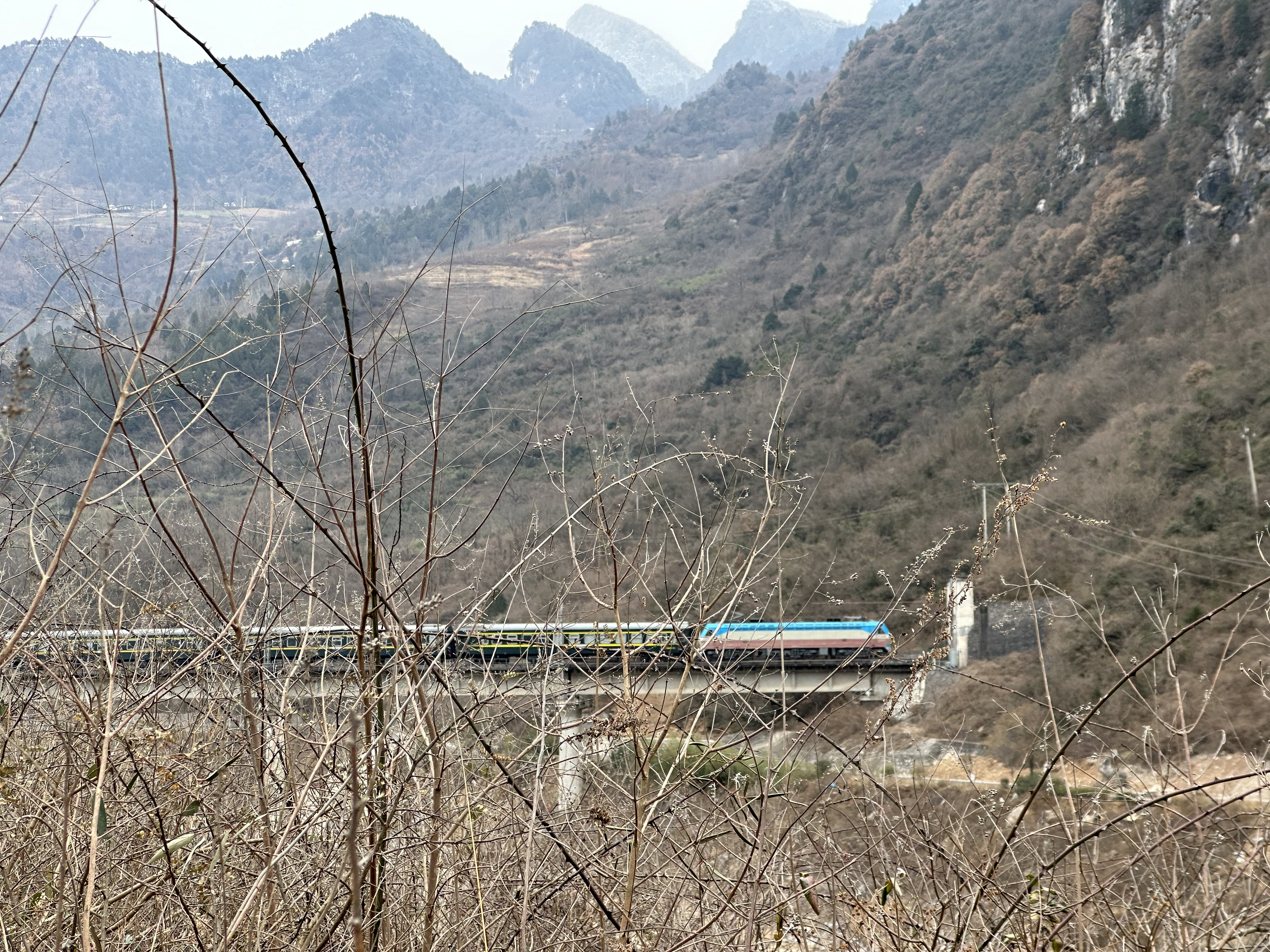
Train K545 entering the new Tunnel 109

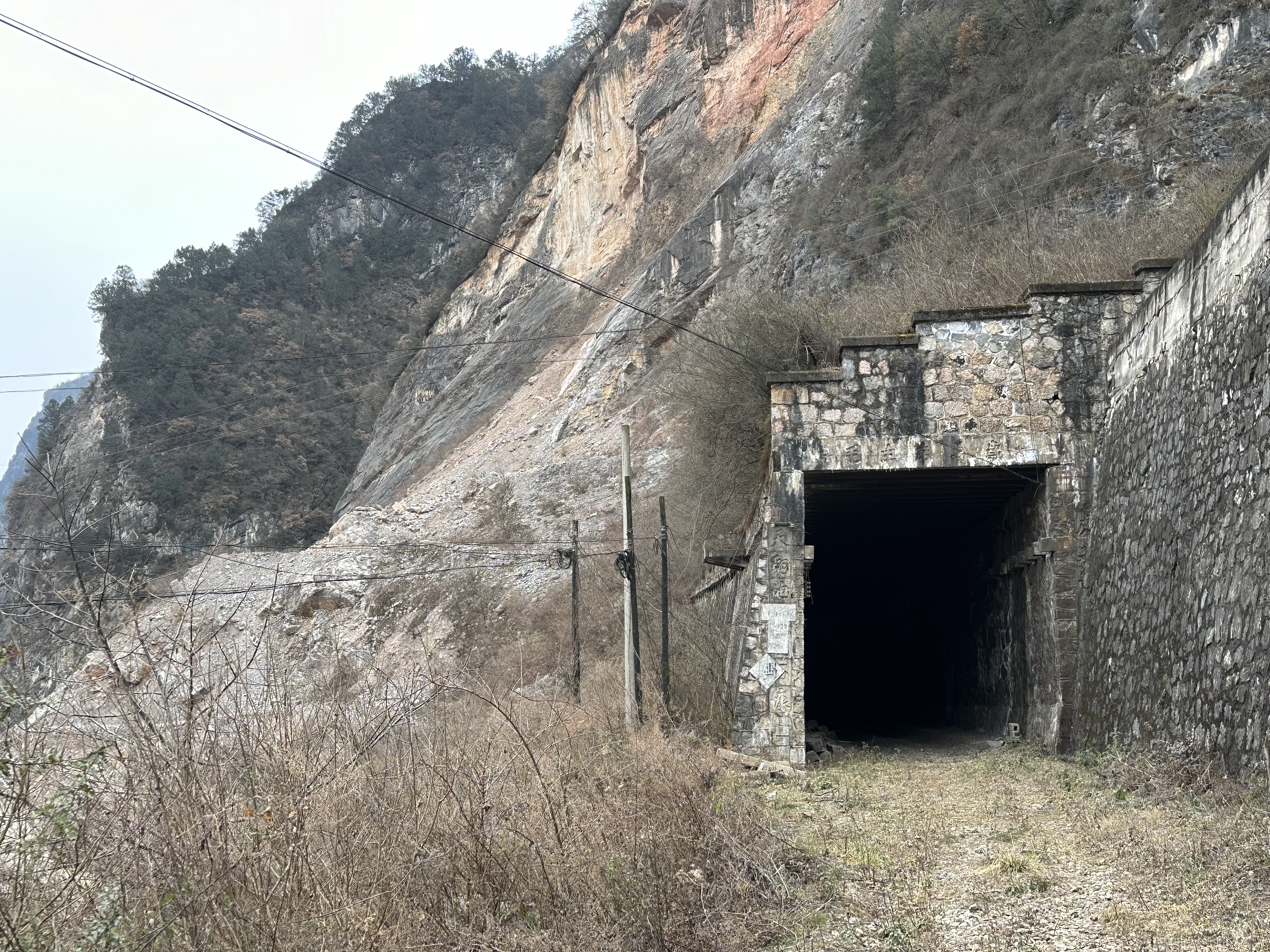
The buried part of the former Tunnel 109 during the 2008 earthquake

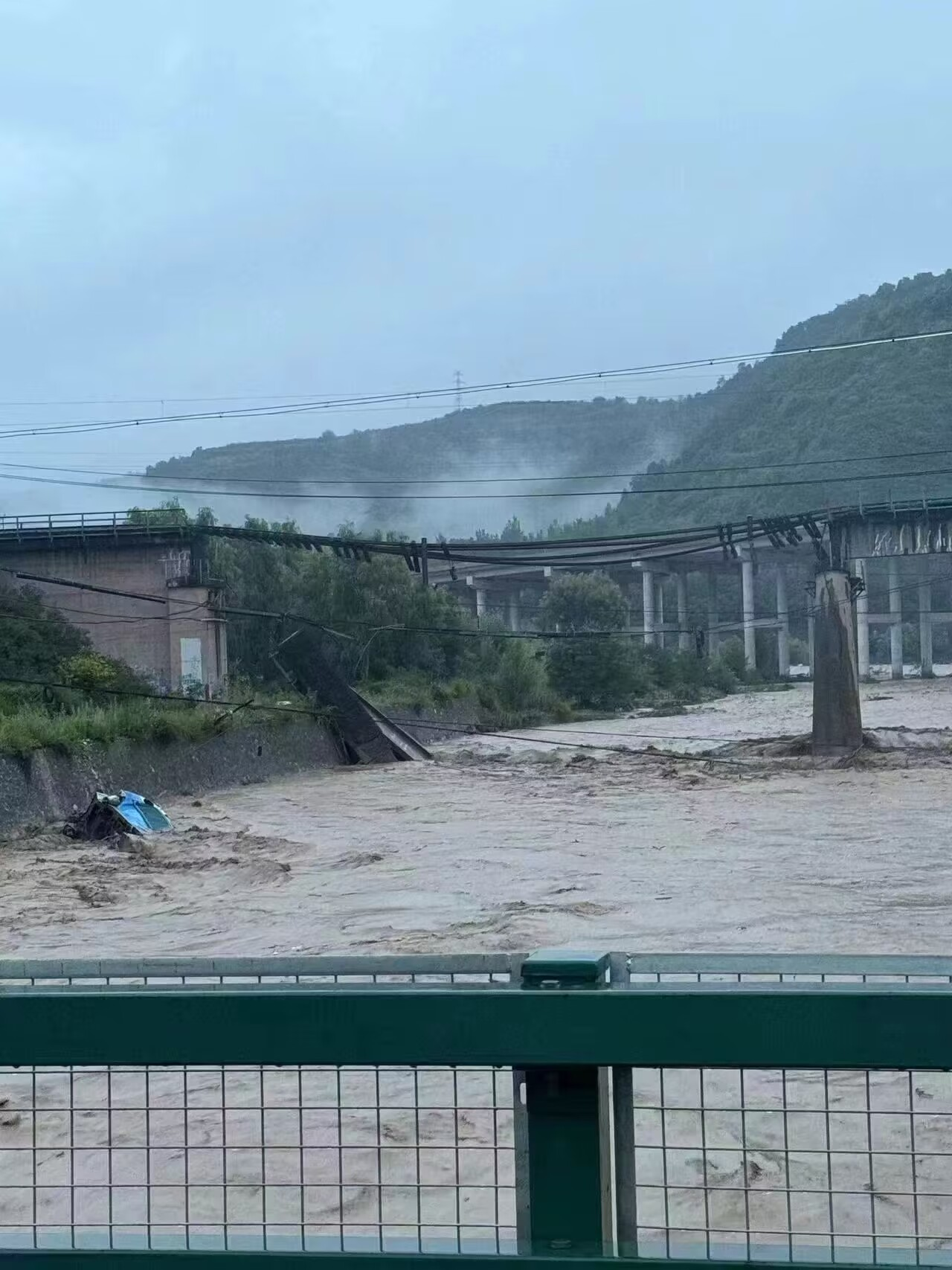
The SS40855 locomotive fell down from the ruins of a bridge on the line during the 17 July 2024 flood

The Baoji–Chengdu railway was built no more than a decade after the founding of the PRC. At the time, the economy was not strong enough to secure the standard of technologies applied for railway constructions due to lack of facilities. Accidents thus kept occurring from the line's establishment due to the extreme weather along the railway.

In 1982, China Railway Xi'an Group determined that the rail line's route should be changed near Lingguanxia due to the subgrade sink caused by the mountain shifts. New route construction finished in 1986.

On 21 June 1984, a seat coach was attacked by three rocks that fell from a mountain in Wangjiatuo–Lesuhe section. Altogether, five passengers were injured, and many coach windows were damaged.

The 2008 Sichuan earthquake denied Tunnel No. 109 on the line when an oil tank coach exploded after being hit by a falling rock. A new Tunnel No. 109 was built on 12 November 2008 which abandoned the former tunnel for a faster speed of trains. The earthquake also made the entire line's service pause for 12 days.

In the afternoon of 19 August 2010, a bridge of the railway in Guanghan was brought down by floods, causing two coaches of a train fell into the river. All 1,318 passengers on the train were evacuated with no one injured. (Note: There're also statements that 3 of the passengers were injured.) The bridge was rebuilt on 21 August, and service was restored on 13 October.

In July 2024, over 70 places on the line were destroyed by the flood in Baoji. At midnight on 17 July, a safety maintenance locomotive fell down from a flood-destroyed bridge into river. On 10 August, services were restored.

== Influences ==
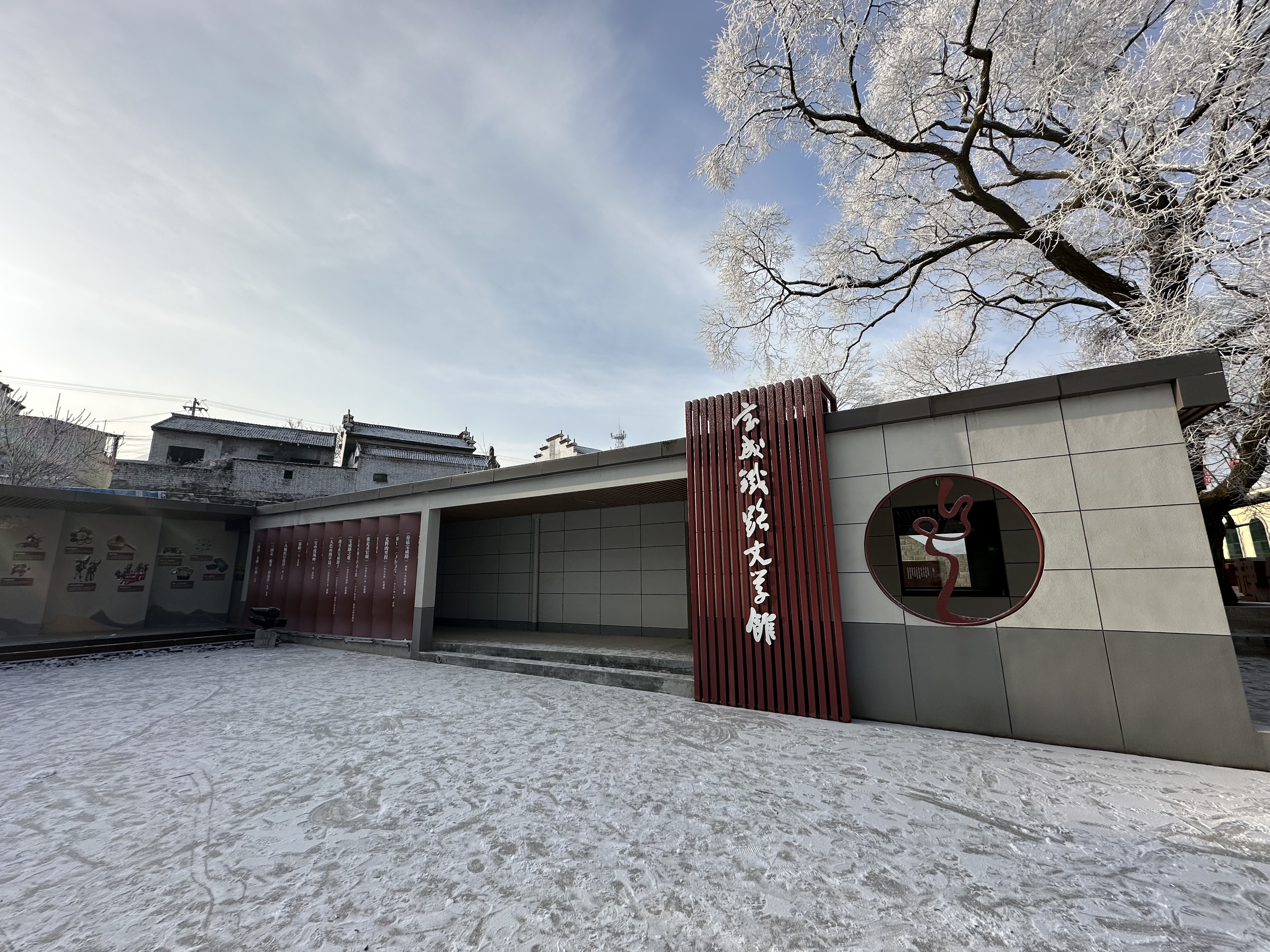
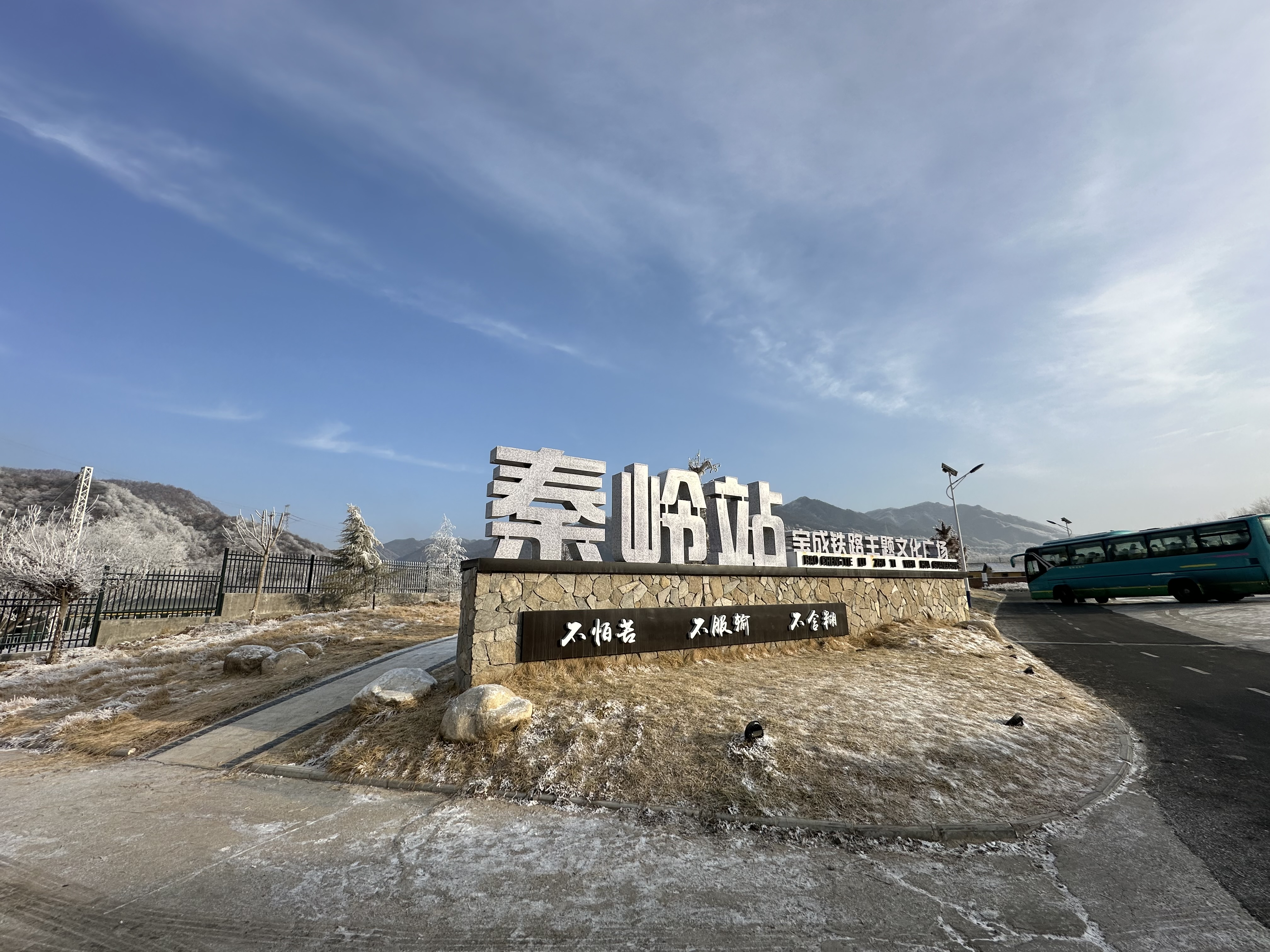
Museums and theme parks near Qinling railway station of Baoji–Chengdu Railway

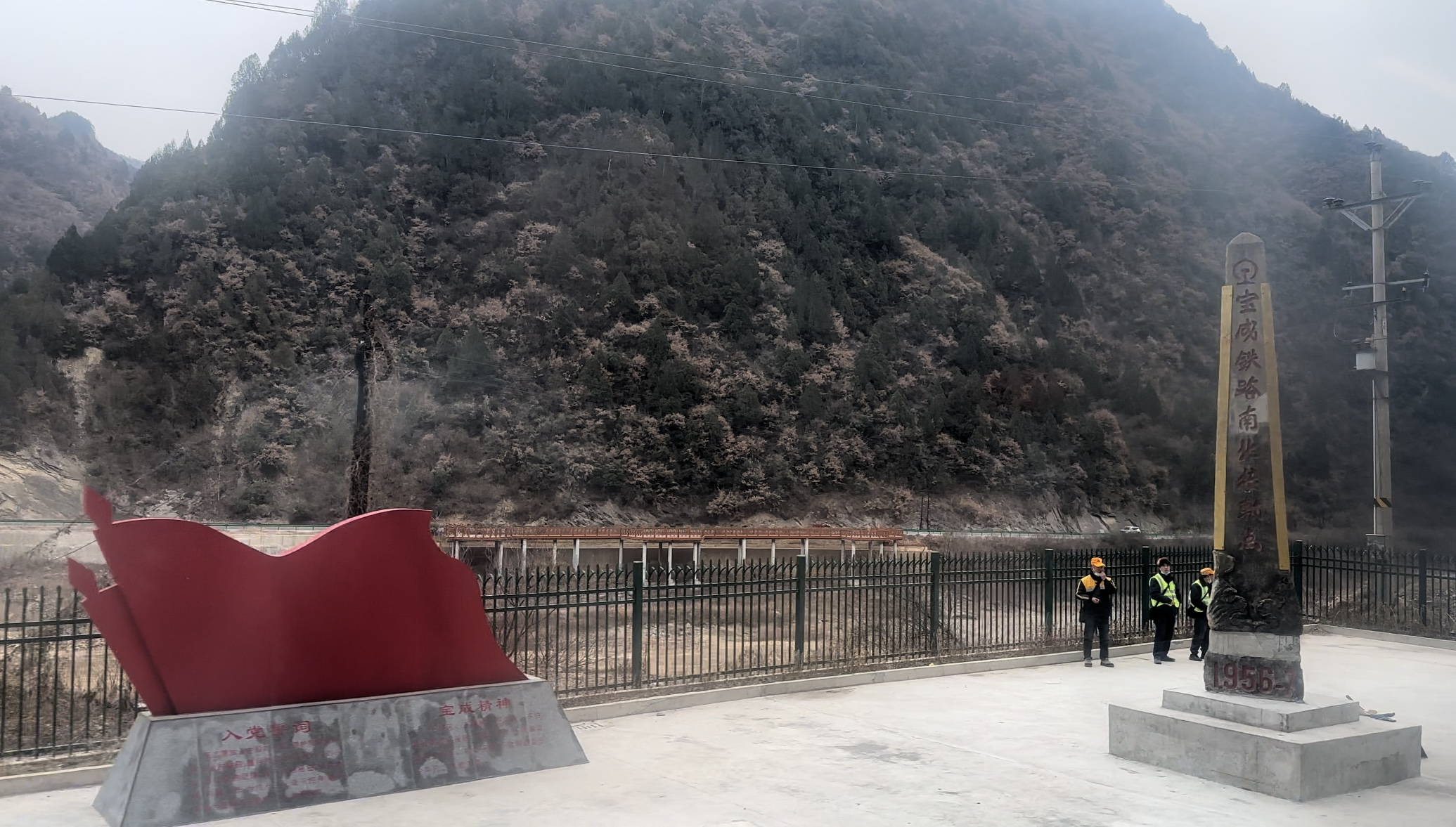
The monument of Baoji–Chengdu Railway's connection and the red-flag-shaped statue nearby

=== Education ===
The Baoji–Chengdu railway succeeded in cultivating talents regarding the design, construction, and manufacturing of electric locomotives and railroads due to its role as the first electrified railway line in China; ultimately, the rail line pushed forward domestic education regarding electrical engineering. It also convinced the MOR that all lines should employ electrical networks afterwards, thus increasing demand on electric operations and therefore an increasing number of related schools in colleges nationwide. This, in turn, brought in more talent for further promotion of electrified railroads in China.

=== Literatures ===
Yan Yi, a writer from Hebei, published The Rainbow Bridge (simplified Chinese: 《彩桥》; traditional Chinese: 「彩橋」; pinyin: Cǎiqiáo), a 1,500-row narrative poem in July 1957 based on stories of bridge construction in the Bao–Cheng Line.

In 1958, Du Pengcheng, another domestic writer, published A Night Walk in Lingguanxia (simplified Chinese: 《夜走灵官峡》; traditional Chinese: 「夜走靈官峽」; pinyin: Yèzǒu Língguānxiá), a novel basing on his interviews and experiences at the construction site of the line in the autumn of 1955. The work was once copied to Mandarin Chinese textbooks in some regions.

=== Exhibition ===
In 2008, Fengxian transformed abandoned tunnels, which had been abandoned after the 1980s flood, into scenic spots for tourism.

Xujiaping, a town in Lüeyang County, cooperated with China Railway Xi'an Group to transform the ruins of tunnels and railroads into cultural zones. The ruins have now been listed as a provincial site for preservation. China Railway Xi'an Group also built museums and theme parks related to the rail line near Qinling railway station on 18 May 2022.

The Baoji Locomotive Maintenance Factory held the 2nd National Stamp Collecting Exhibition on Rail Cultures with the aim of celebrating the 65th anniversary of the rail line's official operations in April 2023. The exhibition was also intended to celebrate the achievements of China P. R. and stimulate the patriotism of the public.

=== Spirits ===
Descendants have called the superb spirits of workers on the line as the "Bao–Cheng spirit" (simplified Chinese: 宝成精神; traditional Chinese: 寶成精神; pinyin: Bǎo Chéng Jīngshén), which stands for "Say no to quit, say no to surrender, say no to equivocate".

== See also ==
External image
- "Want to experience beautiful China? Hop on for a ride". China Daily.

- List of railways in China
- Longhai railway and Chengdu–Kunming railway, the rest parts of the Lanzhou–Kunming Corridor
- China Railways DJ1, a type of locomotives formerly employed on Baoji–Chengdu Railway
- Cultural Revolution, the time when the rail line got electrified
