= Guangyuan railway station =

Railway station in Sichuan, China

Guangyuan railway station 广元站
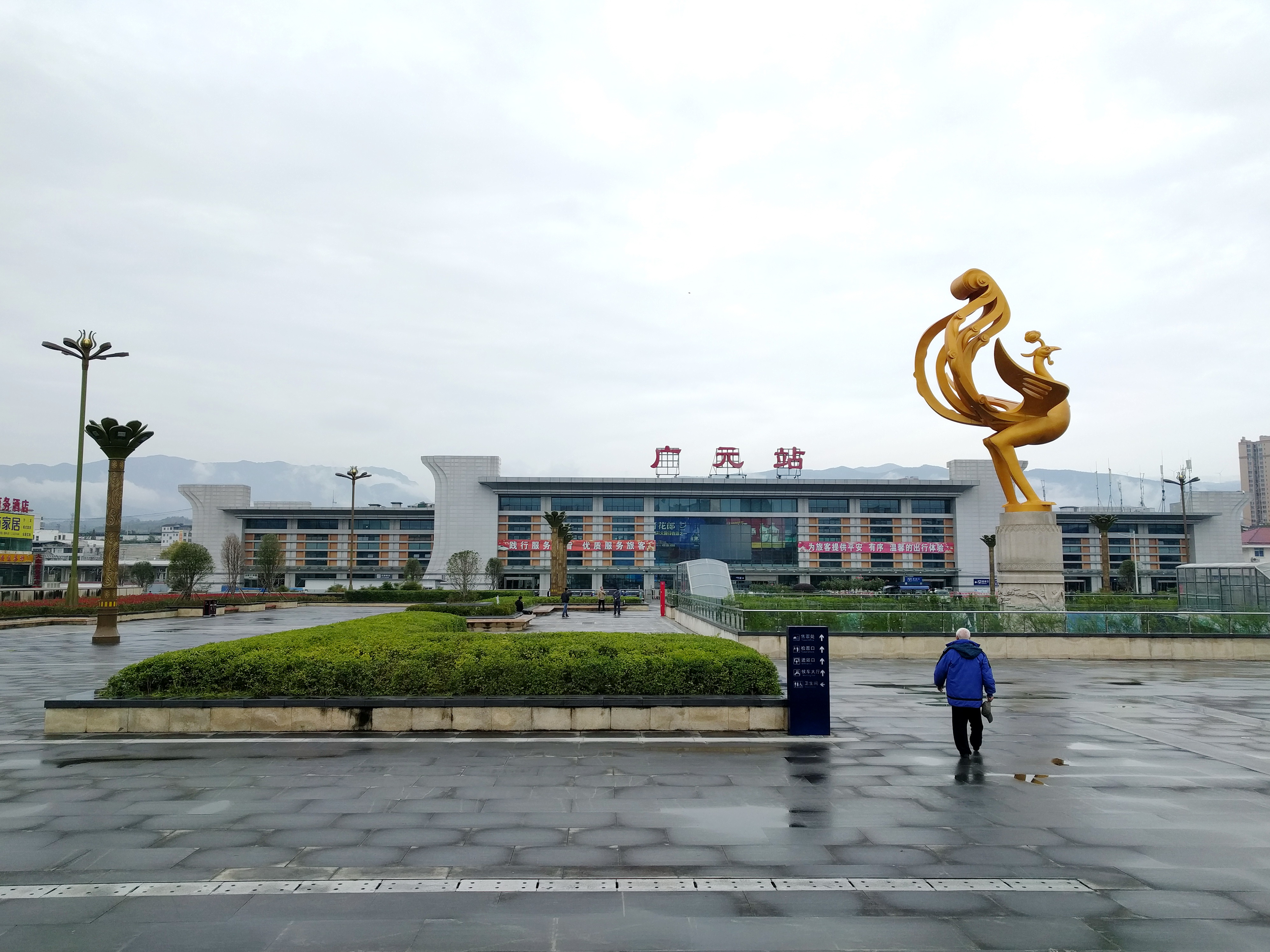

General information
- Location: Lizhou District, Guangyuan, Sichuan; China
- Coordinates: 32.4526°N 105.8179°E
- Operated by: CR Chengdu
- Lines: Baoji–Chengdu railway Lanzhou–Chongqing railway Xi'an–Chengdu high-speed railway

Other information
- Station code: GYW (Telegraph); GYU (Pinyin); 45413 (Station)

History
- Opened: 1954
Location

Guangyuan railway station (Chinese: 广元站) is a first-class railway station in Lizhou District, Guangyuan, Sichuan, China on the Baoji–Chengdu railway, Chongqing–Lanzhou railway, and Xi'an–Chengdu high-speed railway. It was built in 1954.

== History ==
The station was closed for refurbishment from 1 July 2015 to 31 December 2015. It reopened on 1 January 2016.

Preceding station	China Railway	Following station
Chaotian South towards Baoji	Baoji–Chengdu railway	Jiangyou towards Chengdu
Cangxi towards Chongqing North or Chongqing West	Chongqing–Lanzhou railway	Yaodu towards Lanzhou
Preceding station	China Railway High-speed	Following station
Chaotian towards Xi'an North	Xi'an–Chengdu high-speed railway	Jianmenguan towards Chengdu East
