= China Railways HXD3 =

Class of Chinese electric locomotives

HXD3 和谐3型电力机车
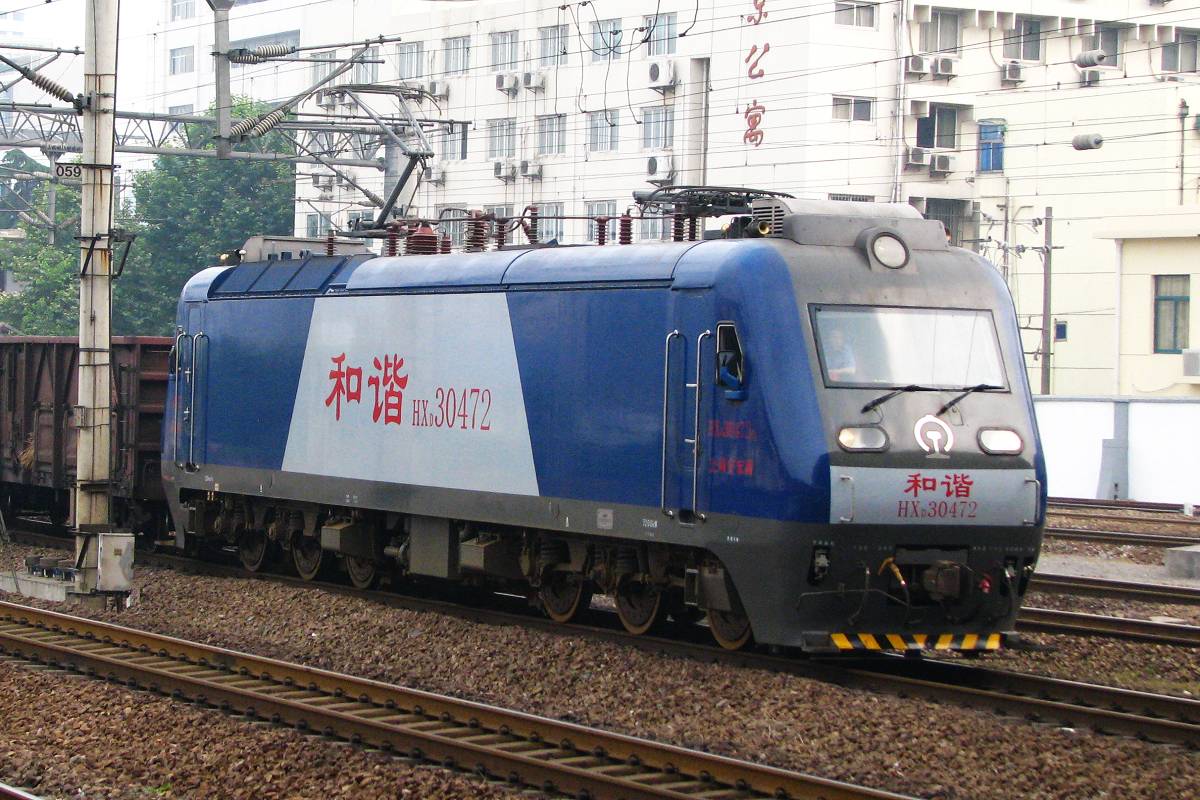
- HXD3-0472
Type and origin
- Power type: Electric
- Designer: Toshiba
- Builder: Toshiba, CRRC Dalian, CRRC Datong (HXD38xxx), CRRC Beijing Feb. 7th
- Model: DJ3
- Build date: 2003 (SSJ3); 2006－
- Total produced: 1 (SSJ3); 1040 (HXD3)
Specifications
- Configuration
  - UIC: Co′Co′
- Gauge: 1,435 mm (4 ft 8 1/2 in)
- Axle load: 23 t (22.6 long tons; 25.4 short tons) / 25 t (24.6 long tons; 27.6 short tons)
- Loco weight: 138 t (136 long tons; 152 short tons) / 150 t (150 long tons; 170 short tons)
- Electric system/s: 25 kV 50 Hz AC Catenary
- Current pickup(s): Pantograph
- Traction motors: YJ85A x6
- Transmission: Voith SET-553
Performance figures
- Maximum speed: 132 km/h (82 mph) (Test); 120 km/h (75 mph) (Service)
- Power output: 7,200 kW (9,700 hp)
- Tractive effort: 520 kN (120,000 lb_{f}) / 570 kN (130,000 lb_{f}) (starting); 370 kN (83,000 lb_{f}) (continuous) @ 70 km/h (43 mph); 370 kN (83,000 lb_{f}) (braking) from 70 km/h (43 mph) to 10 km/h (6.2 mph)
Career
- Numbers: HX_{D}30001-HX_{D}30890; HX_{D}38001-HX_{D}38150
- Nicknames: Monkey
- Locale: People's Republic of China

The HXD3 (Chinese: 和谐3型电力机车) is an electric locomotive built in mainland China by CRRC Dalian Locomotives.

The locomotive is designed for hauling 5,000t freight trains on main lines. It was jointly developed by CNR Dalian Locomotives and Toshiba.

The first prototype (SSJ3-0001) was rolled out from Dalian and underwent testing on the loop track of Beijing CARS in 2004.

Dalian commenced mass production of the locomotive in 2004 with an order of 60 pieces by the Ministry of Railways (MOR). The first mass-produced locomotive was rolled out in 2006. MOR later increased the order from 60 to 240, than to 640, and finally to 1040 locomotives.

Most locomotives were allocated on Jinghu Railway and Jingguang Railway on freight schedules.

== Gallery ==
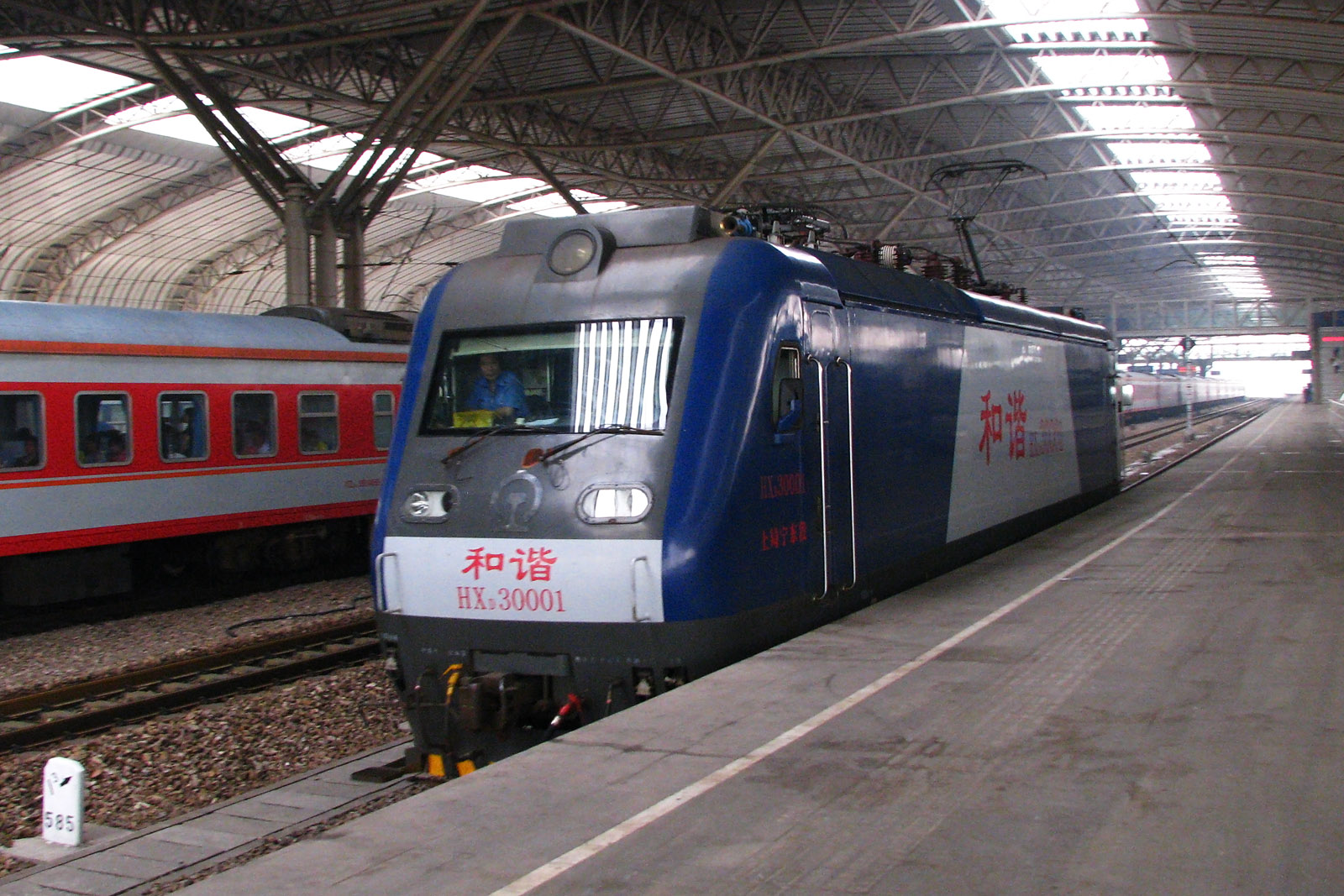
HXD3-0001

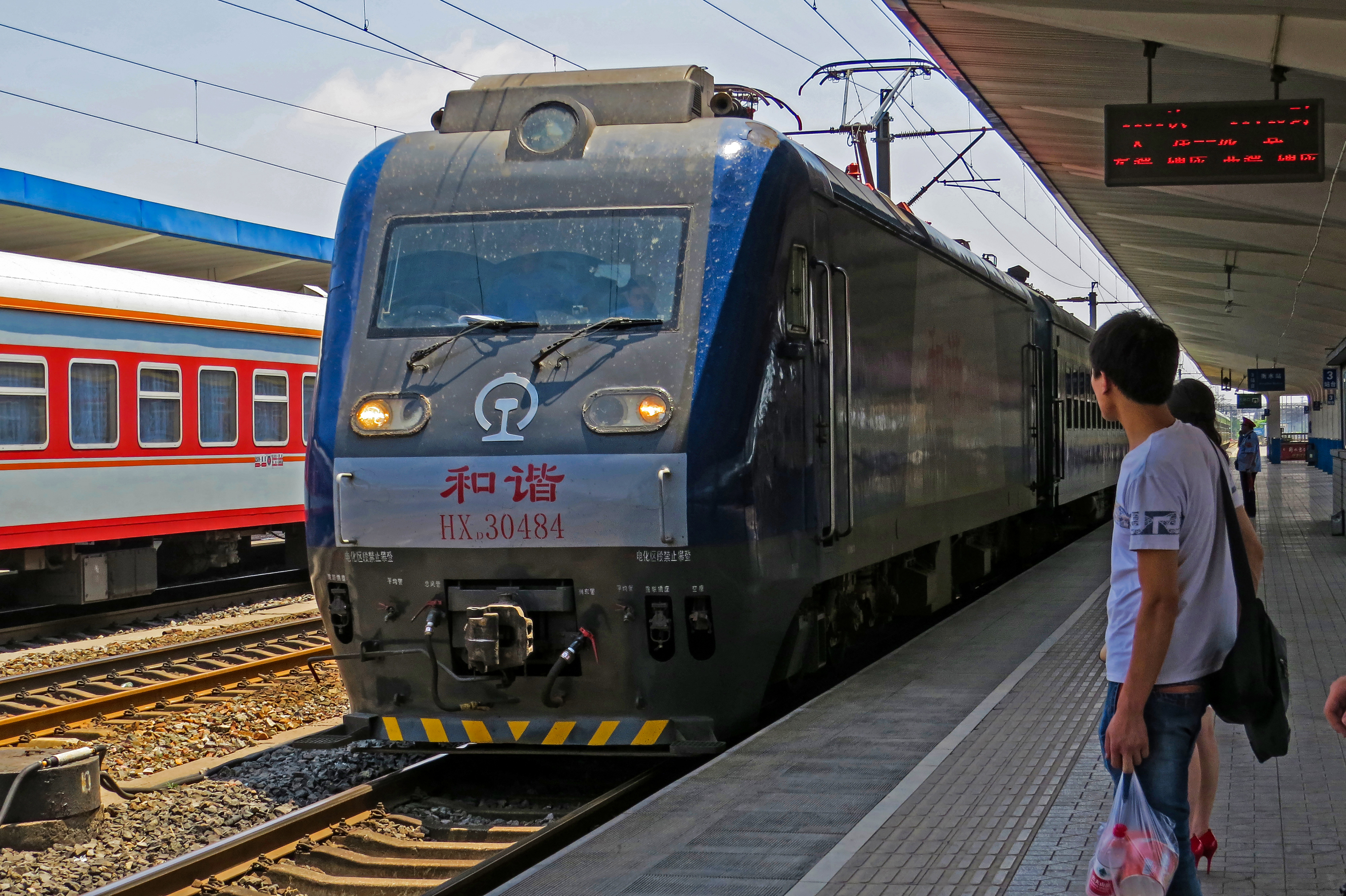
HXD3-0484 in Hengshui Railway Station

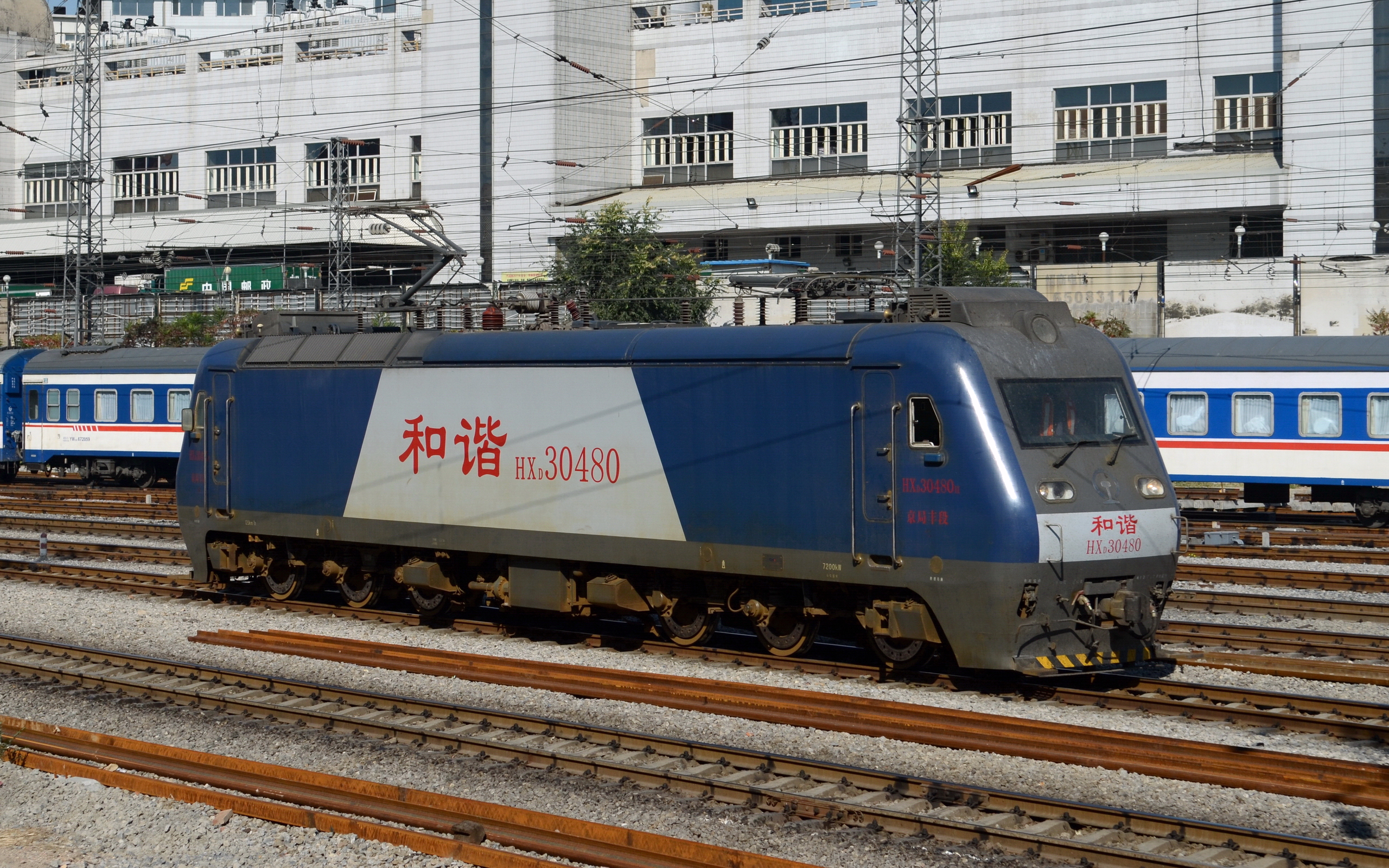
HXD3-0480
