= Tianshui South railway station =

Railway station in Tianshui City, Gansu, China

Tianshuinan 天水南
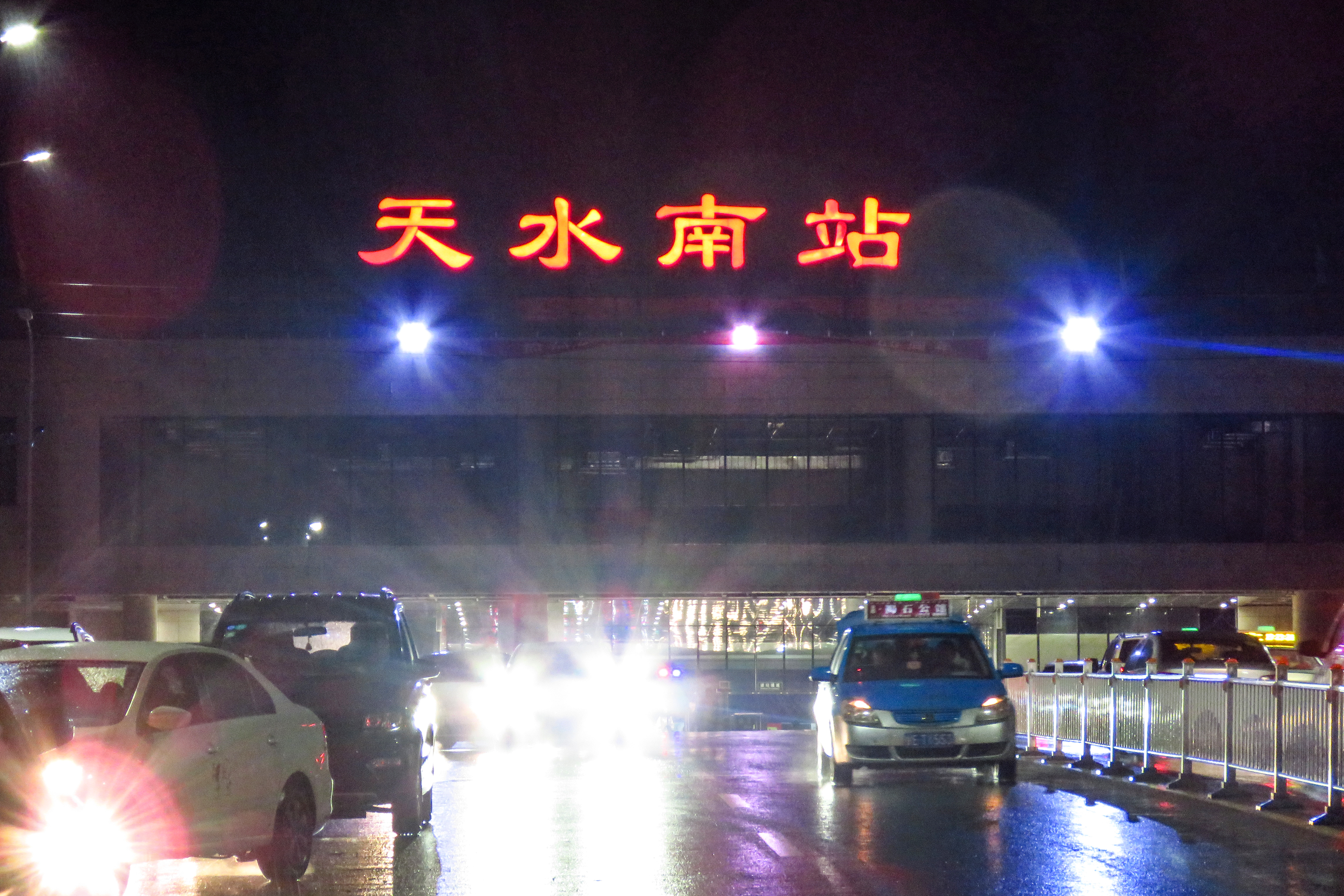

General information
- Location: Zhaoya Village, Huaniu Town, Maiji District, Tianshui, Gansu; China
- Coordinates: 34.550354°N 105.852027°E
- Line: Xuzhou–Lanzhou High-Speed Railway

Other information
- Station code: 38988

History
- Opened: July 9, 2017; 8 years ago

Services
Preceding station	China Railway High-speed	Following station
Dongcha towards Xuzhou East	Xuzhou–Lanzhou high-speed railway	Qin'an towards Lanzhou West
Location

The Tianshui South railway station is a railway station of Xi'an–Baoji High-Speed Railway in Gansu, China. It started operations on 9 July 2017. The other station in the area is Tianshui railway station. An interchange with the Tianshui Tram is planned.
