= Kaifeng North railway station =

Railway station in Kaifeng, China

Kaifengbei 开封北
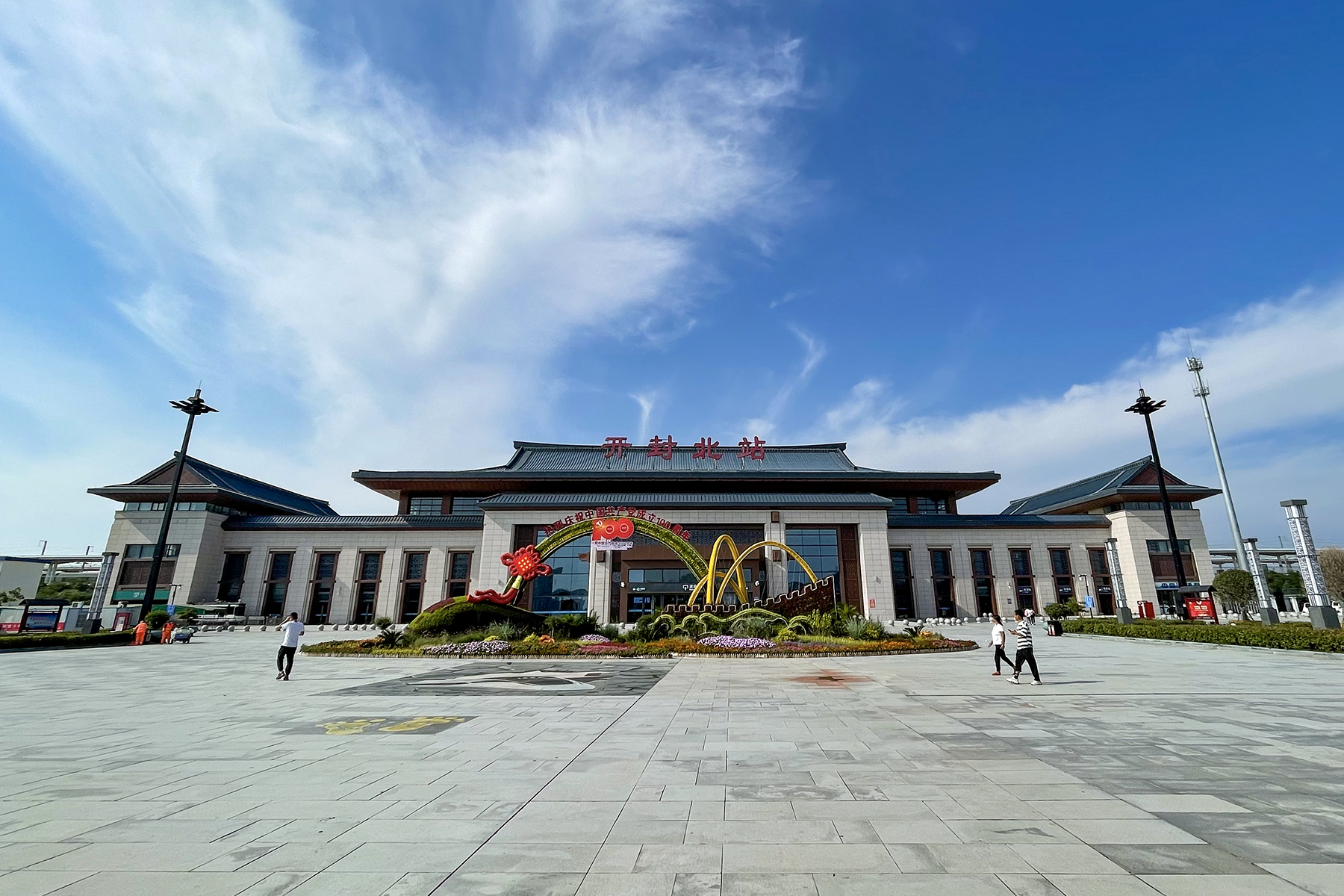

General information
- Other names: Kaifeng North
- Location: Longting District, Kaifeng; China
- Coordinates: 34°50′27.6″N 114°15′21.4″E
- Operator: CR Zhengzhou
- Line: Xuzhou–Lanzhou High-Speed Railway
- Platforms: 2
- Tracks: 4
- Connections: Bus terminal

Other information
- Station code: 38948 (TMIS code); KBF (telegraph code); KFB (Pinyin code)

History
- Opened: 10 September 2016

Services
Preceding station	China Railway High-speed	Following station
Lankao South towards Xuzhou East	Xuzhou–Lanzhou high-speed railway	Zhengzhou East towards Lanzhou West
Location

Kaifeng North railway station (Chinese: 开封北站; pinyin: Kāifēng běi zhàn) is a railway station of Xuzhou–Lanzhou high-speed railway in Longting District, Kaifeng, Henan, China. The station started operation on 10 September 2016, together with the Zhengzhou–Xuzhou section of the railway.

== Design ==
The station building was designed to resemble the architecture style of the Northern Song dynasty, during which Kaifeng was the capital of China.

== Station Layout ==
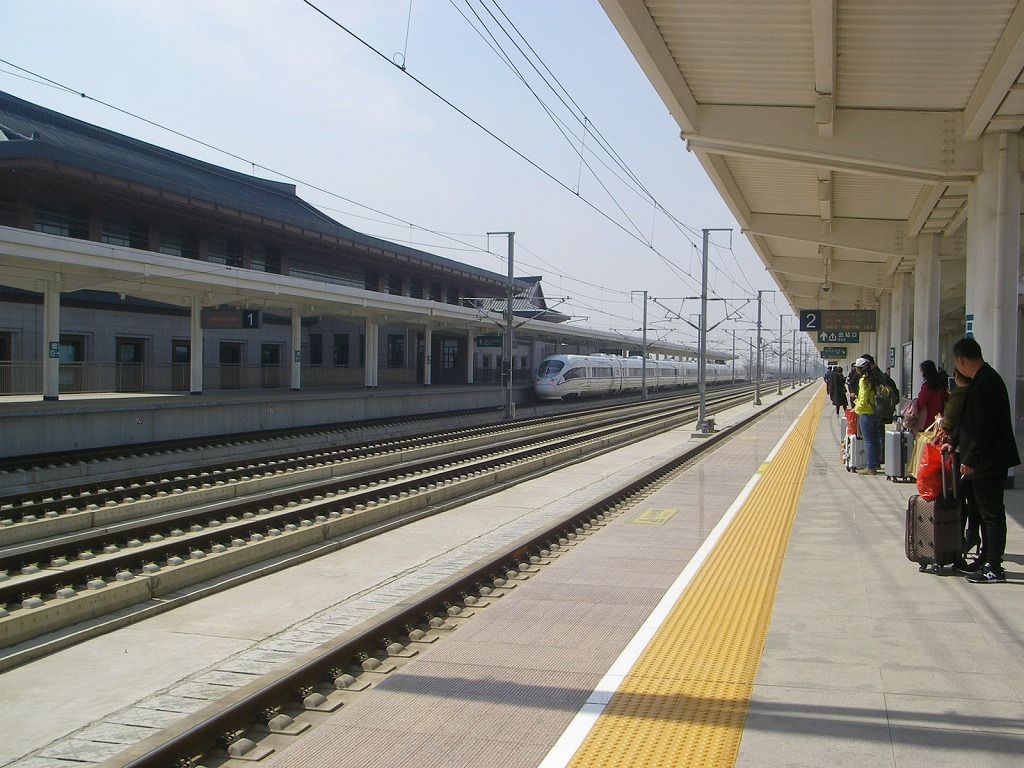
Platforms of the station

The platforms and tracks of the station are elevated on the 2nd level. The station has 2 side platforms and 4 tracks, of which 2 are through tracks for non-stop trains. The Platform 1 (northern platform) is for eastbound trains towards Shangqiu and Xuzhou East while the Platform 2 (southern platform) is for westbound trains towards Zhengzhou East and Xi'an North. The two-level station building is to the south of the platforms. The ticket office and VIP lounge are on the first level and the waiting halls are located on both levels.

2F	Side platform
2F	Platform 1	Xuzhou–Lanzhou high-speed railway towards Xuzhou East (Lankao South) →
2F	Through track	Xuzhou–Lanzhou high-speed railway →
2F	Through track	← Xuzhou–Lanzhou high-speed railway
2F	Platform 2	← Xuzhou–Lanzhou high-speed railway towards Lanzhou West (Zhengzhou East)
2F	Side platform
2F	Concourse	Waiting area, restaurants, stores
1F	Concourse	Ticket offices, waiting area, VIP lounge, restaurants, stores
