= Dingxi (disambiguation) =

Dingxi is a prefecture-level city in Gansu province, People's Republic of China.

Dingxi may also refer to:

- Dingxi metro station, a metro station of the Taipei Metro
- Dingxi North railway station, a railway station of Baoji–Lanzhou High-Speed Railway
- Dingxi railway station, a station on Longhai railway
- Dingxi Village (頂溪里), a village in Yonghe District, New Taipei City, Taiwan

== See also ==
- Tingxi
