= Baoji South railway station =

Railway station in Baoji, China

Baojinan 宝鸡南
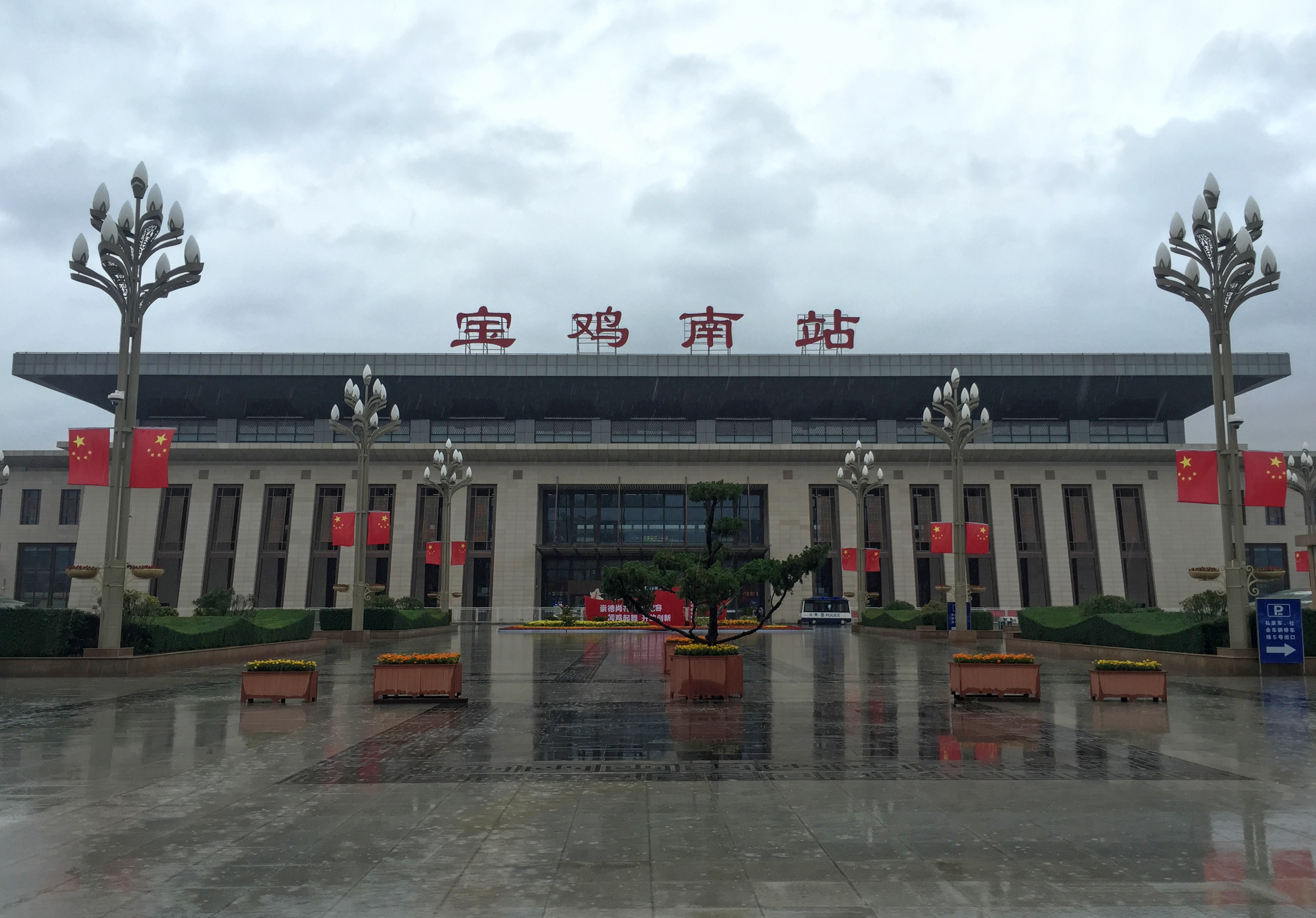
- Station building in October 2017

General information
- Location: Maying, Weibin District, Baoji, Shaanxi; China
- Coordinates: 34.335637°N 107.227860°E
- Line: Xuzhou–Lanzhou high-speed railway
- Platforms: 5
- Tracks: 11

Other information
- Station code: TMIS code: 39020; Telegraph code: BBY; Pinyin code: BJN
- Classification: 1st class station

History
- Opened: December 28, 2013

Services
Preceding station	China Railway High-speed	Following station
Qishan towards Xuzhou East	Xuzhou–Lanzhou high-speed railway	Dongcha towards Lanzhou West
Location

The Baoji South railway station is a railway station of Xi'an–Baoji high-speed railway and Baoji-Lanzhou high-speed railway that is located in Baoji, Shaanxi, China.

== History ==
On November 28, 2012, construction of Baoji South railway station began. The station opened on December 28, 2013, along with the opening of the Xuzhou–Lanzhou high-speed railway's Xi'an–Baoji section. On July 9, 2017, the Baoji–Lanzhou section also connected to the Baoji South station.

The design of the station combines elements of the Qin and Zhou dynasties' high platform architecture with classical roofs and columns. The eaves feature abstract representations of "phoenix feathers" using classical Chinese wooden elements, while bronze classical decorations extend from the center of the building's facade to the sides, reflecting Baoji's illustrious bronze culture.

== Station information ==
Baoji South railway station is located in the High-tech Industrial Development Zone of Baoji. The station building covers an area of 20,000 square meters, with 5 platforms and 11 tracks (reserving 3 platforms and 3 tracks for the Guanzhong Intercity Railway, totaling 8 platforms and 14 tracks).

A depot with 5 tracks is also built as part of the station. The original Baoji South Station on the Baocheng Railway was renamed Renjiawan Station.
