= Dingxi station (disambiguation) =

Dingxi station may refer to:

- Dingxi metro station, a metro station of the Taipei Metro
- Dingxi railway station, a station on Longhai railway

== See also ==
- Dingxi North railway station, a railway station of Baoji–Lanzhou High-Speed Railway
