= Dongcha =

Dongcha 东岔镇
- Town
- Location in Gansu Province
- Coordinates: 34°22′48″N 106°39′44″E
- Country: China
- Province: Gansu
- City: Tianshui
- District: Maiji

Government
  - Secretary of the Party Committee: Wang Ping (王萍)

Area
  - Total: 370 km^{2} (140 sq mi)

Population
  - Total: 10,742
- Time zone: UTC+8 (China Standard Time)
- Postal code: 741036
- Area code: 093

Dongcha is a town in Maiji District, Tianshui, China. It is located at the main eastern gateway to Gansu, 106 km east from the built-up area of Tianshui, and 64 km east of Baoji.

It governs 14 administrative villages and has a total population of 10,742.

The economy depends on forestry, fruit and walnut orchards, animal husbandry, and tourism.

== See also ==
- Dongcha railway station
