= Dingxi North railway station =

Railway station in Dingxi, Gansu, China

Dingxibei 定西北
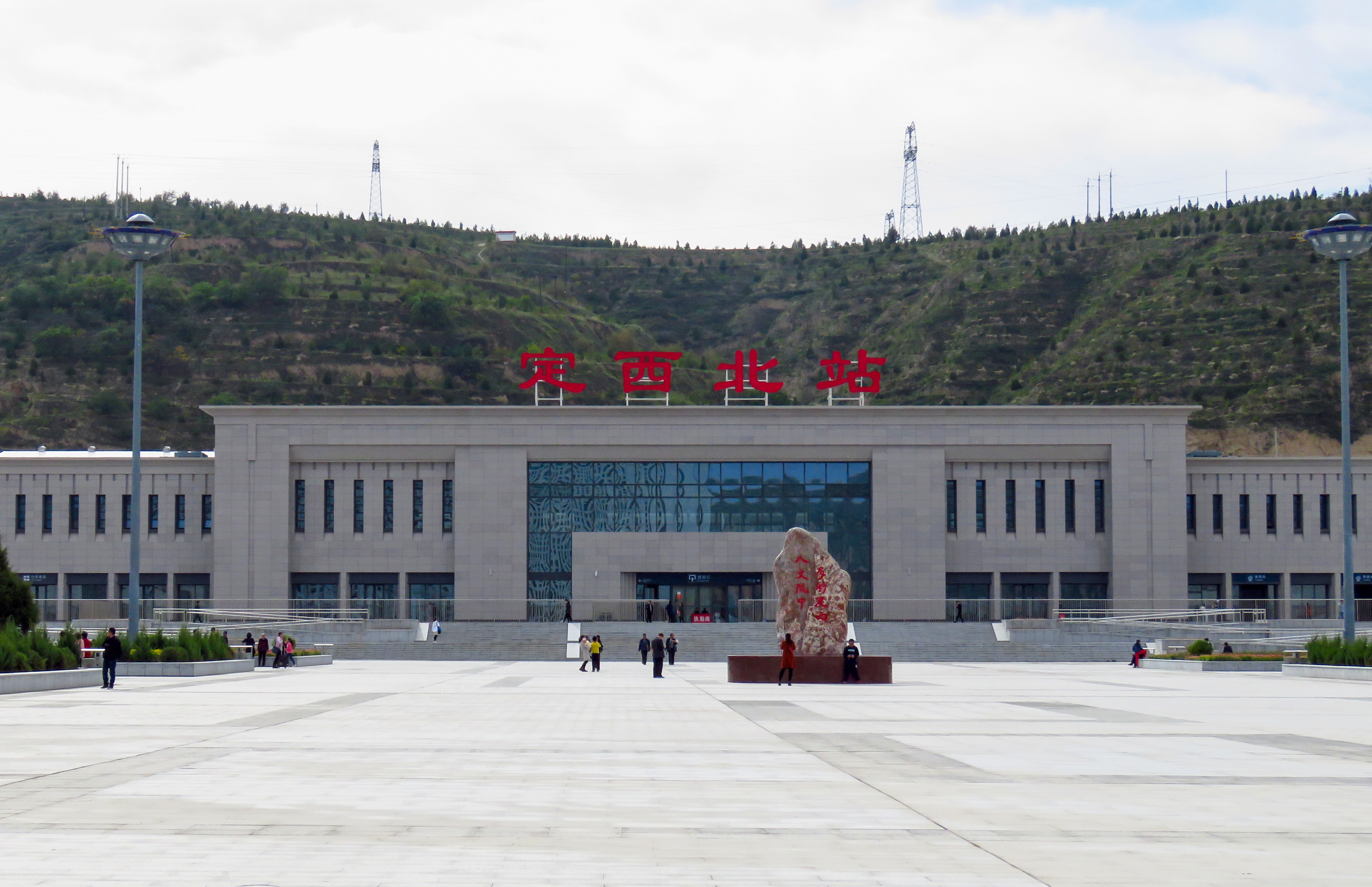
- Station building in 2017

General information
- Location: Lintao Rd, Anding District, Dingxi, Gansu; China
- Coordinates: 35.606763°N 104.583420°E
- Line(s): Xuzhou–Lanzhou High-Speed Railway
- Platforms: 2
- Tracks: 6

Other information
- Station code: 38996

History
- Opened: July 9, 2017

Services
| Preceding station | China Railway High-speed | Following station |
|---|---|---|
| Tongwei towards Xuzhou East | Xuzhou–Lanzhou high-speed railway | Yuzhong towards Lanzhou West |

Dingxi North railway station (Chinese: 定西北站) is a railway station of Baoji–Lanzhou High-Speed Railway, in Dingxi, Gansu, China. This station opened on 9 July 2017.

== Station layout ==
| 2F | Platform 4 | Xuzhou–Lanzhou High-Speed Railway towards Lanzhou West (Yuzhong) → |
| 2F | Island platform |
| 2F | Platform 3 | Xuzhou–Lanzhou High-Speed Railway towards Lanzhou West (Yuzhong) → |
| 2F | Main line | Xuzhou–Lanzhou High-Speed Railway (westbound) → |
| 2F | Main line | ← Xuzhou–Lanzhou High-Speed Railway (eastbound) |
| 2F | Platform 2 | ← Xuzhou–Lanzhou High-Speed Railway towards Xuzhou East (Xiaxiaocha) |
| 2F | Island platform |
| 2F | Platform 1 | ← Xuzhou–Lanzhou High-Speed Railway towards Xuzhou East (Xiaxiaocha) |
| 1F | Station building | Exits and entrances, ticket office, waiting room, faregates, administration offices |
| 1F | Connection | Parking lot, bus station |
