= Baoji–Lanzhou high-speed railway =

Railway line in China

Xuzhou–Lanzhou high-speed railway Baoji–Lanzhou Section 徐兰高速铁路宝兰段

Overview
- Status: Operating
- Locale: Shaanxi and Gansu
- Termini: Baoji South; Lanzhou West

Service
- Type: High-speed rail
- Operator(s): China Railway High-speed

History
- Opened: 9 July 2017

Technical
- Line length: 401 km (249 mi)
- Track gauge: 1,435 mm (4 ft 8 1/2 in) standard gauge
- Operating speed: 250 km/h (155 mph)

Baoji–Lanzhou high-speed railway
- Simplified Chinese: 徐兰高速铁路宝兰段
- Traditional Chinese: 徐蘭高速鐵路寶蘭段
Transcriptions
Standard Mandarin
- Hanyu Pinyin: Xú-Lán Gāosù Tiělù Bǎo-Lán Duàn
- IPA: [ɕǔ.lǎn káʊ.sû tʰjè.lû páʊ.lǎn twân]

Baoji–Lanzhou Passenger Dedicated Line
- Simplified Chinese: 宝兰客运专线
- Traditional Chinese: 寶蘭客運專線
Transcriptions
Standard Mandarin
- Hanyu Pinyin: Bǎo-Lán Kèyùn Zhuān Xiàn
- IPA: [páʊ.lǎn kʰɤ̂.ŷn ʈʂwán ɕjɛ̂n]

The Baoji–Lanzhou high-speed railway is a high-speed railway operated by China Railway High-speed between Baoji in western Shaanxi province and Lanzhou, the capital of Gansu province. It forms part of the Xuzhou–Lanzhou high-speed railway, itself part of the Eurasia Continental Bridge corridor of China's "Eight Vertical and Eight Horizontal" network. The railway cut the rail travel between Baoji and Lanzhou from five hours to one hour and a half (two hours in revenue service). It connects with the Xi'an–Baoji high-speed railway to the east and the Lanzhou–Urumqi high-speed railway to the west. The feasibility study report has been approved by the National Development and Reform Commission. The construction work was expected to start in the first half of 2011, but it actually started in October 2012. The line started operations on 9 July 2017.

Seven stations are built along the line: Baoji South, Dongcha, Tianshui South, Qin'an, Tongwei, Dingxi North, and Lanzhou West. 92% of the total length is elevated or in tunnels. The total investment is estimated to be CN¥ 64,000,000,000 (US$10 billion). It was the first railway to serve Qin'an and Tongwei.

== Stations ==
| Station Name | Metro transfers/connections |
|---|---|
| Baoji South | |
| Dongcha | |
| Shijiawan (closed) | |
| Tianshui South | Tianshui Tram (planned) |
| Qin'an | |
| Tongwei | |
| Dingxi North | |
| Yuzhong | |
| Lanzhou West | 1 |
