= Baoji rapid transit system =

Planned rapid transit system

The Baoji rapid transit system is a rapid transit system in the planning phase in Baoji, Shaanxi, China. It is planned as a monorail with four lines.

== Lines ==
So far, there have been a total of four lines confirmed:

- Line 1 from Jiangtan Road to Geely Industrial Park
- Line 2 passing through Guangyuan Road to Longteng Road and possibly further;
- Line 3 from Baoji South to Guozhen railway stations (both already served by the Longhai railway) with an extension planned from Qunli Road to Liancun, Fengxiang County.
- Line 4 will pass through Qingjiang Road to Dahancun Road and possibly further.

== Project history ==
On March 30, 2017, Baoji's transit system plan passed the technical review of the Provincial Housing and Construction Department. On April 26, 2018, the Baoji Transit Project's environmental impact report passed inspection by the Ministry of Environmental Protection.
