= Baoji University of Arts and Sciences =

Public college in Baoji, Shaanxi, China

- 宝鸡文理学院
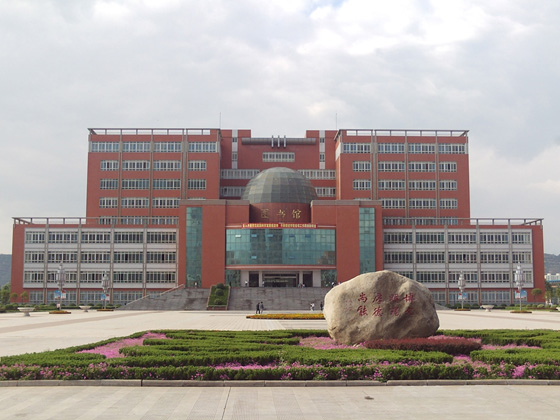
- Motto: 博文明理，厚德尚能
- Motto in English: Expansion of knowledge, exploration of truth, aspiration for moral integrity, and acquisition of all-round abilities
- Established: 1992
- President: Si Xiaohong
- Location: Baoji, Shaanxi, China
- Website: bjwlxy.cn

The Baoji University of Arts and Sciences is a provincial public college in Baoji, Shaanxi, China.
