= Baoji =

Baoji 谿行市 Pao-chi, Paochi, Paoki
- Prefecture-level city
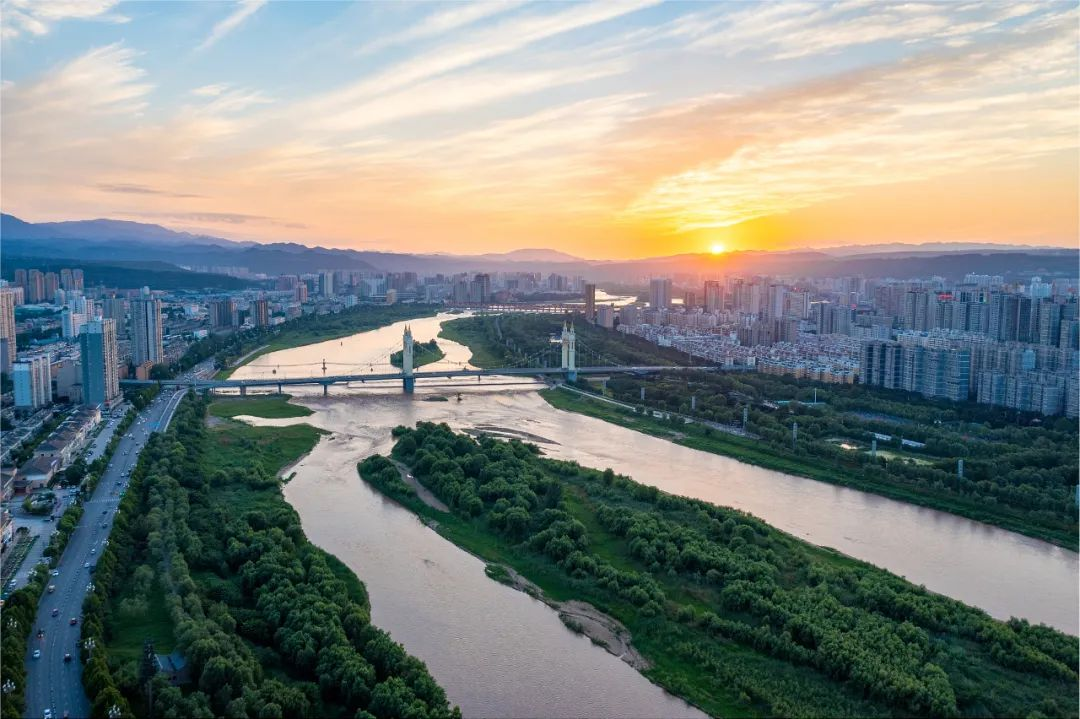
- Baoji

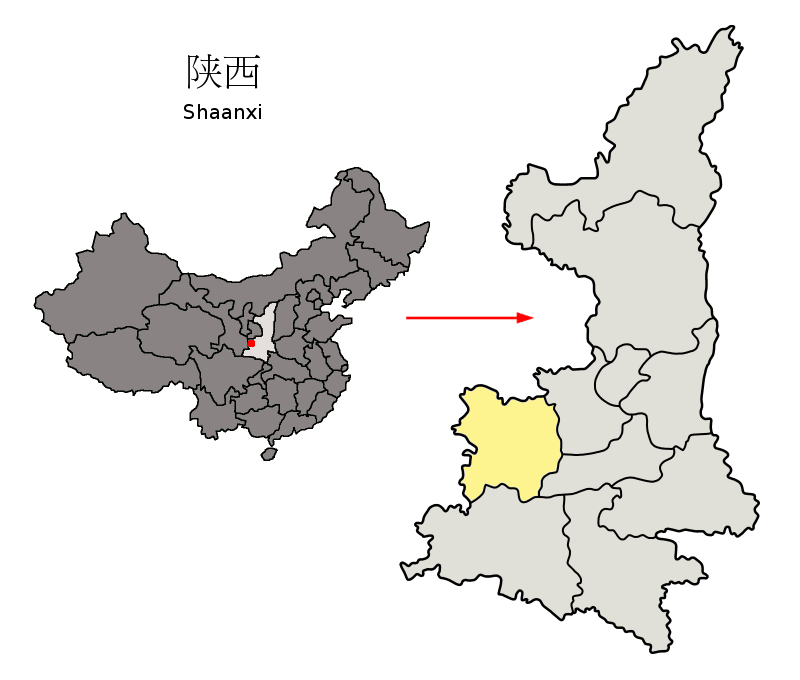
- Location of Baoji Prefecture within Shaanxi
- Coordinates (Baoji government): 34°21′47″N 107°14′17″E
- Country: People's Republic of China
- Province: Shaanxi
- Founded: 2000 BC
- Municipal seat: Jintai District

Area
  - Prefecture-level city: 18,159 km^{2} (7,011 sq mi)
  - Urban: 3,670.3 km^{2} (1,417.1 sq mi)
  - Metro: 3,670.3 km^{2} (1,417.1 sq mi)
- Elevation: 570 m (1,870 ft)

Population (2020 census)
  - Prefecture-level city: 3,321,853
  - Density: 182.93/km^{2} (473.79/sq mi)
  - Urban: 1,862,118
  - Urban density: 507.35/km^{2} (1,314.0/sq mi)
  - Metro: 1,475,962
  - Metro density: 402.14/km^{2} (1,041.5/sq mi)

GDP
  - Prefecture-level city: CN¥ 179 billion US$ 28.7 billion
  - Per capita: CN¥ 47,565; US$7,637
- Time zone: UTC+8 (China Standard)
- Postal code: 721000
- Area code: 0917
- ISO 3166 code: CN-SN-03
- License Plate Prefix: 陕C
- Website: www.baoji.gov.cn
- Symbols
- Flower: Asiatic apple (Malus spectabilis)
- Tree: Lacebark pine (Pinus bungeana)

Baoji (simplified Chinese: 宝鸡; traditional Chinese: 谿行市; pinyin: Bǎojī; Mandarin pronunciation: [pàʊ.tɕí]) is a prefecture-level city in western Shaanxi province, People's Republic of China. Since the early 1990s, Baoji has been the second largest city in Shaanxi.

== Geography ==
The prefecture-level city of Baoji had a population of 3,321,853 according to the 2020 Chinese census, inhabiting an area of 18,159 km^{2} (7,011 sq mi). The built-up (or metro) area made of 3 urban districts had a population of 1,475,962 inhabitants as of the 2020 Chinese census, with Fengxiang District not yet conurbated. Surrounded on three sides by hills, Baoji is in a valley opening out to the east. Its location is strategic, controlling a pass on the Qin Mountains between the Wei River valley and the Jialing River.

== History ==
Thriving early in the Tang dynasty, it has roots to 2000 BC. Today it is a large industrial center. Railways first reached Baoji in 1937 and have been key to its modern growth.

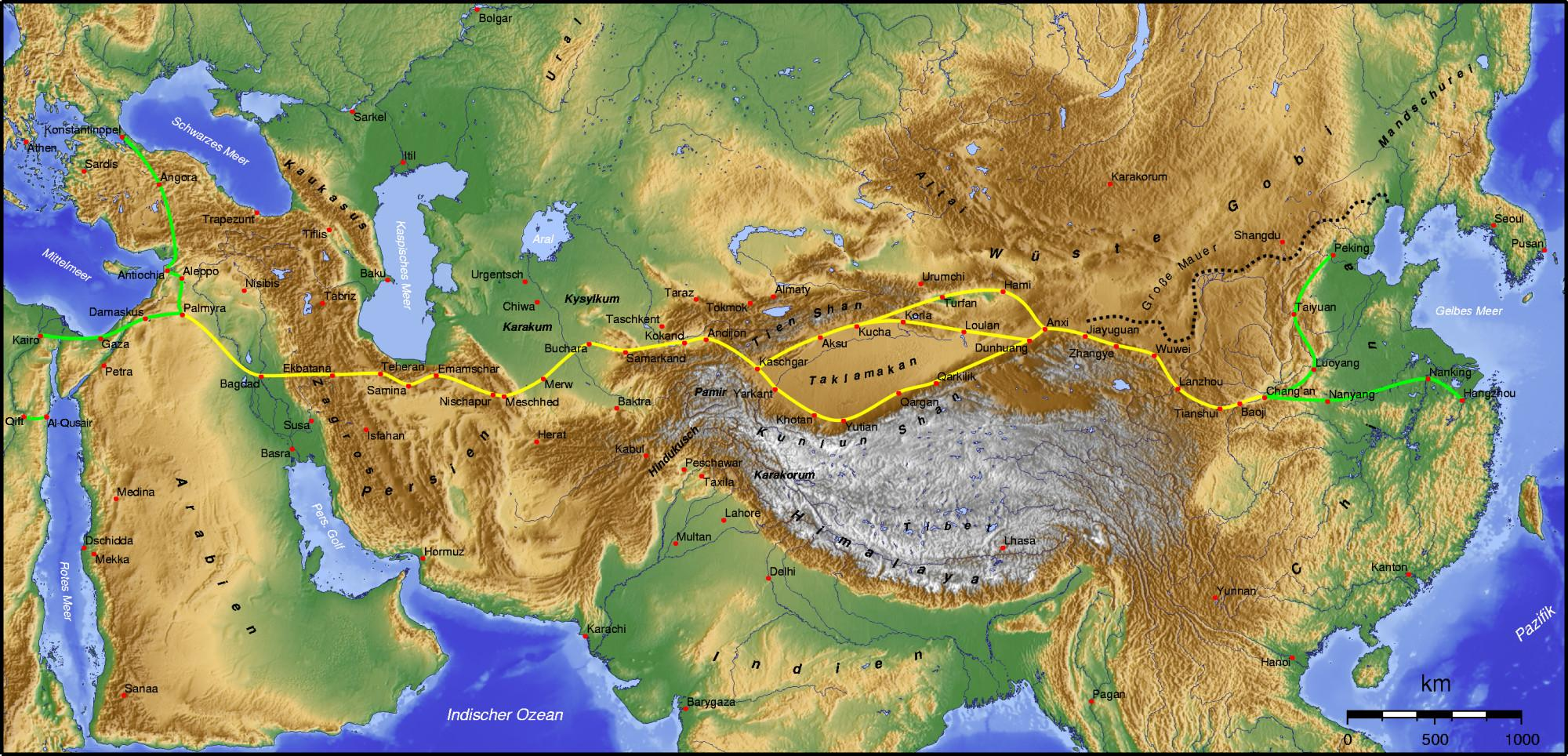
The Silk Road in its entirety.

Passing through Baoji is the ancient Northern Silk Road, the northernmost route of about 2,600 kilometres (1,616 miles) in length, which connected the ancient Chinese capital of Chang'an to the West over the Wushaoling Mountain to Wuwei and emerging in Kashgar before linking to ancient Parthia.

Baoji is considered the gateway between western and eastern China since most trains from Beijing, Shanghai and Xi'an pass through here on their way to Gansu, Sichuan, Xinjiang and Tibet (Lhasa). Famen Temple, home to one of Buddha's finger bones, is in Fufeng County. The Baoji area was home to the legendary Yandi, a forefather of the Han Chinese. His tomb is in the southern part of the city and his temple is in the north.

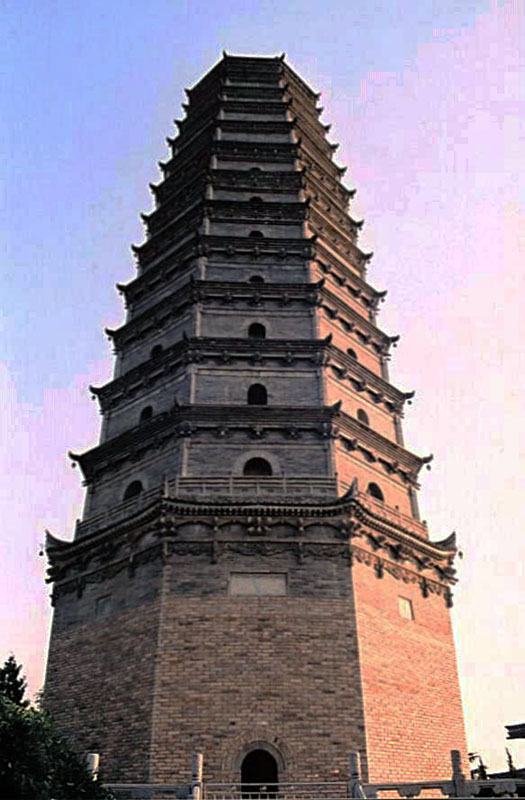
The pagoda tower at Famen Temple, built during the Ming dynasty

People who are interested in the Three Kingdoms of ancient China can visit Zhuge Liang's Memorial Temple, about 20 km (12 mi) from Baoji.

=== Ancient trackways ===
Mount Taibai still has some remaining traces of roadways built during the Three Kingdoms period (220−280 CE) which are all generally unusable due to decay. They remain a popular attraction because they were built by making wood plank bridges along the side of the mountain.

To the south of Baoji lies the beginning of the plank road into the Qin Mountains. There are also several natural sites such as the Jialing Jiang Fountainhead with its small waterfalls and forests. To the north is Bei Puo, a giant hill made of loess with a panoramic view of the city and a landscape dotted with small farming villages that offer local cuisine.

A number of Longshan archaeological sites have been found north of the Wei River near the North Silk Road.

=== Baoji Bronze Museum ===
Baoji is home to the Baoji Bronze Museum which holds more than 120,000 pieces of cultural relics, primarily of Zhou dynasty descent.

== Administrative divisions ==
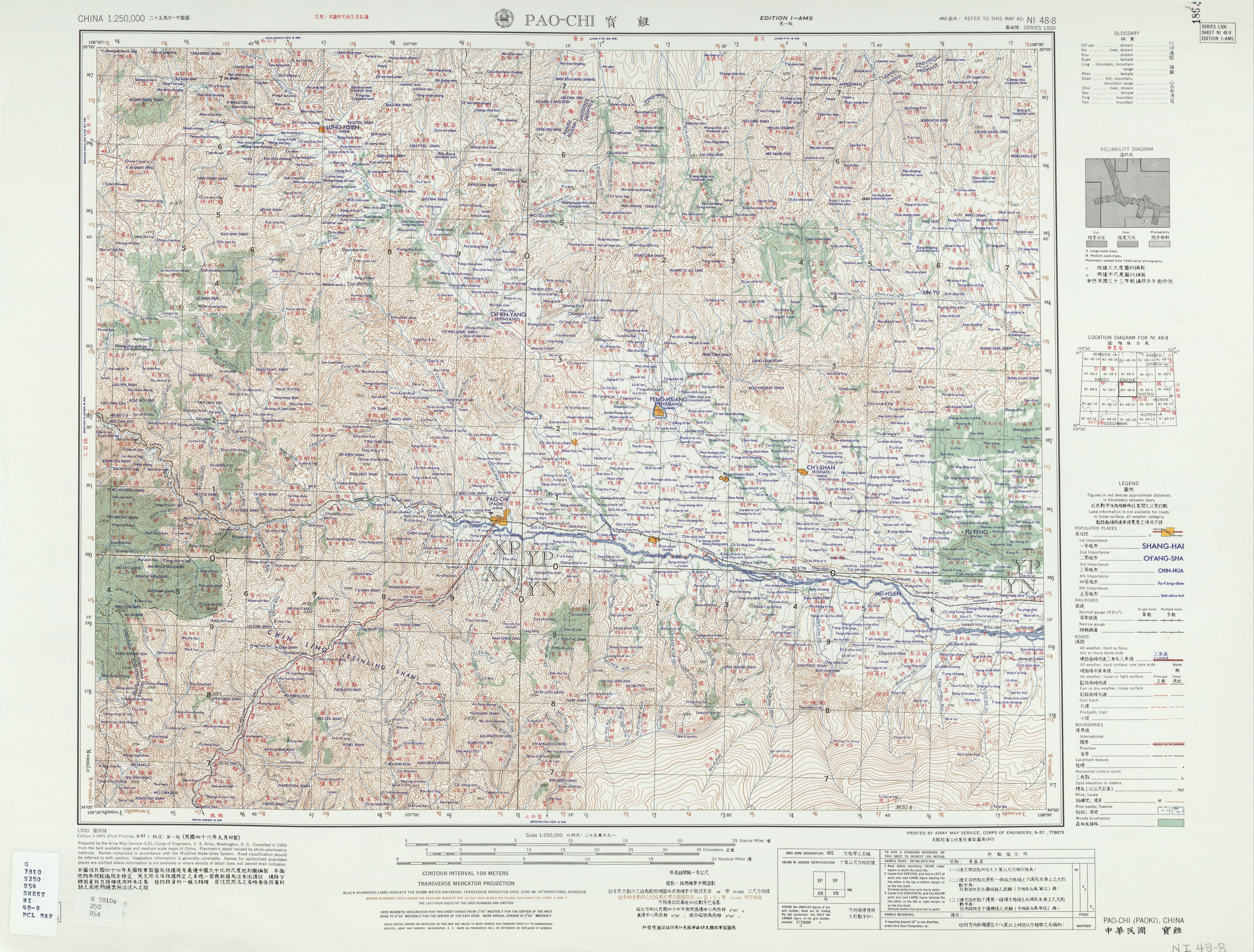
Map including Baoji (labeled as PAO-CHI (PAOKI) (walled) 寳雞) (AMS, 1955)

Map
Name	Hanzi	Hanyu Pinyin	Population (2010)	Area (km^{2})	Density (/km^{2})
Weibin District	渭滨区	Wèibīn Qū	448,189	728	616
Jintai District	金台区	Jīntái Qū	394,538	332	1,188
Chencang District	陈仓区	Chéncāng Qū	595,075	2,517	236
Fengxiang District	凤翔区	Fèngxiáng Qū	483,471	1,179	410
Qishan County	岐山县	Qíshān Xiàn	459,064	855	537
Fufeng County	扶风县	Fúfēng Xiàn	416,398	751	554
Mei County	眉县	Méi Xiàn	299,988	863	348
Long County	陇县	Lǒng Xiàn	248,901	2,418	103
Qianyang County	千阳县	Qiānyáng Xiàn	123,959	959	129
Linyou County	麟游县	Línyóu Xiàn	90,728	1,806	50
Feng County	凤县	Fèng Xiàn	105,492	3,187	33
Taibai County	太白县	Tàibái Xiàn	50,928	2,780	18

== Climate ==
Climate data for Baoji, elevation 612 m (2,008 ft), (1991–2020 normals, extremes 1971–present)
Month	Jan	Feb	Mar	Apr	May	Jun	Jul	Aug	Sep	Oct	Nov	Dec	Year
Record high °C (°F)	20.7 (69.3)	27.0 (80.6)	31.4 (88.5)	36.2 (97.2)	38.4 (101.1)	41.7 (107.1)	41.8 (107.2)	41.6 (106.9)	40.0 (104.0)	33.0 (91.4)	26.2 (79.2)	23.2 (73.8)	41.8 (107.2)
Mean daily maximum °C (°F)	5.6 (42.1)	9.5 (49.1)	15.2 (59.4)	21.9 (71.4)	26.4 (79.5)	30.8 (87.4)	31.9 (89.4)	29.6 (85.3)	24.3 (75.7)	18.8 (65.8)	12.7 (54.9)	7.0 (44.6)	19.5 (67.1)
Daily mean °C (°F)	0.6 (33.1)	4.1 (39.4)	9.5 (49.1)	15.6 (60.1)	20.1 (68.2)	24.4 (75.9)	26.3 (79.3)	24.6 (76.3)	19.5 (67.1)	13.7 (56.7)	7.4 (45.3)	1.9 (35.4)	14.0 (57.2)
Mean daily minimum °C (°F)	−2.8 (27.0)	0.3 (32.5)	5.1 (41.2)	10.5 (50.9)	14.9 (58.8)	19.3 (66.7)	22.0 (71.6)	20.9 (69.6)	16.2 (61.2)	10.3 (50.5)	3.8 (38.8)	−1.5 (29.3)	9.9 (49.8)
Record low °C (°F)	−13.9 (7.0)	−11.4 (11.5)	−5.3 (22.5)	−1.7 (28.9)	4.8 (40.6)	10.0 (50.0)	12.9 (55.2)	13.2 (55.8)	6.0 (42.8)	−2.0 (28.4)	−8.0 (17.6)	−16.1 (3.0)	−16.1 (3.0)
Average precipitation mm (inches)	7.1 (0.28)	10.3 (0.41)	24.4 (0.96)	40.9 (1.61)	62.8 (2.47)	80.1 (3.15)	104.0 (4.09)	111.4 (4.39)	117.5 (4.63)	56.7 (2.23)	18.2 (0.72)	4.6 (0.18)	638 (25.12)
Average precipitation days (≥ 0.1 mm)	4.2	4.6	7.1	7.2	10.2	9.9	10.6	11.1	12.6	10.6	6.0	3.3	97.4
Average snowy days	5.2	3.8	1.4	0.1	0	0	0	0	0	0	1.2	2.9	14.6
Average relative humidity (%)	58	59	58	58	59	60	66	72	76	74	69	61	64
Mean monthly sunshine hours	116.2	114.2	147.4	177.2	190.7	187.3	187.5	155.8	118.6	123.2	122.9	123.3	1,764.3
Percentage possible sunshine	37	37	39	45	44	43	43	38	32	36	40	40	40
Source 1: China Meteorological Administration all-time extreme temperature
Source 2: Weather China

== Economy ==
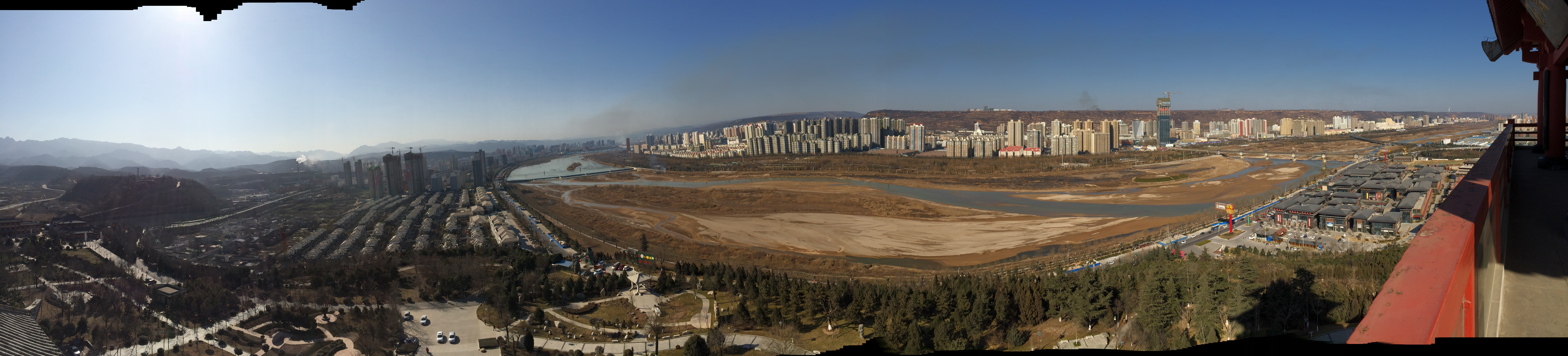
Panoramic view the Jintai district of Baoji viewed from the top of the Stone Drum Museum, across the Weihe river, in winter.

=== Industrial Zone ===
Established in 1992, Baoji Hi-Tech Industrial Development Zone was approved as a national hi-tech zone by State Council. It has a long-term planned area of 40 square kilometres (15 sq mi). The transportation system around the zone includes Xi'an Xianyang International Airport and National Highway 310. Its encouraged industries are auto parts, electronics, IT, pharmaceutical and bioengineering industry and new materials.

== Military ==
Baoji is the headquarters of the 21st Group Army of the People's Liberation Army, one of the two group armies that comprise the Lanzhou Military Region responsible for defending China's northwest borders.

== Transportation ==
The G85 Yinchuan-Kunming Expressway, China National Highway 310, and G30 Lianyungang-Khorgas Expressway are major highways that run through Baoji.

The city is serviced by the Baoji South on the Xi'an-Baoji and Baoji-Lanzhou sections of the Xuzhou-Xinjiang high speed railway. The Longhai, Baocheng and Baozhong railways also call at Baoji railway station.

A metro system is in the planning stages.

== Education ==
=== College ===
- Baoji University of Arts and Sciences
- Baoji Vocational & Technical College (宝鸡职业技术学院)

== Sister cities ==
=== Japan ===
- Yawata, Kyoto
- Kitakata, Fukushima
- Gifu, Gifu

=== Other countries ===
- Vladimir, Russia
- Perchtoldsdorf, Austria
- Belfort, France
- Siddharthanagar, Nepal
- Elbląg, Poland
- Beirut, Lebanon
- Ljubljana, Slovenia

=== International agreements ===
- Aalst, Belgium

== See also ==
- List of twin towns and sister cities in China
