= Jintai District =

Jintai 金台区
- District
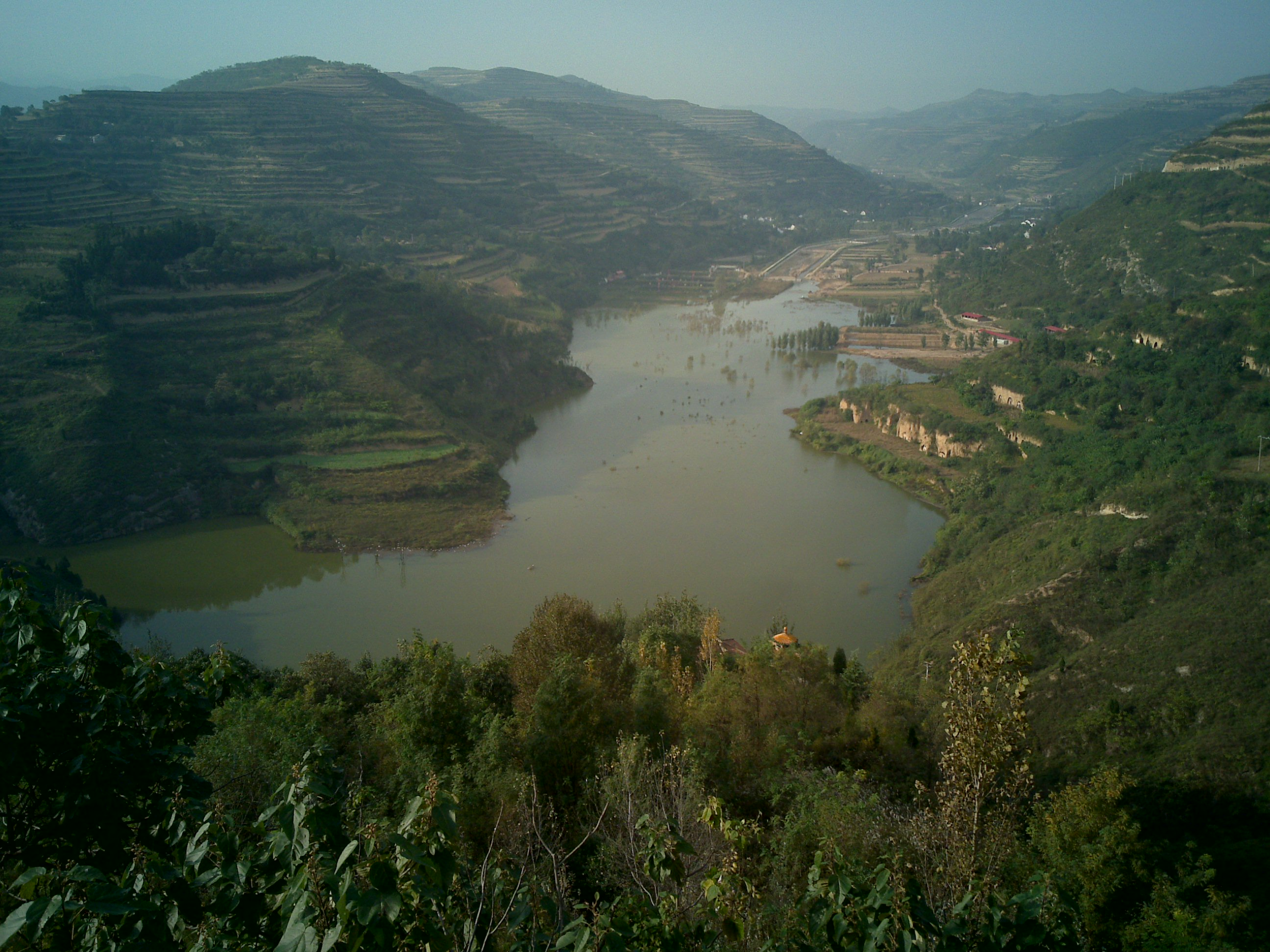

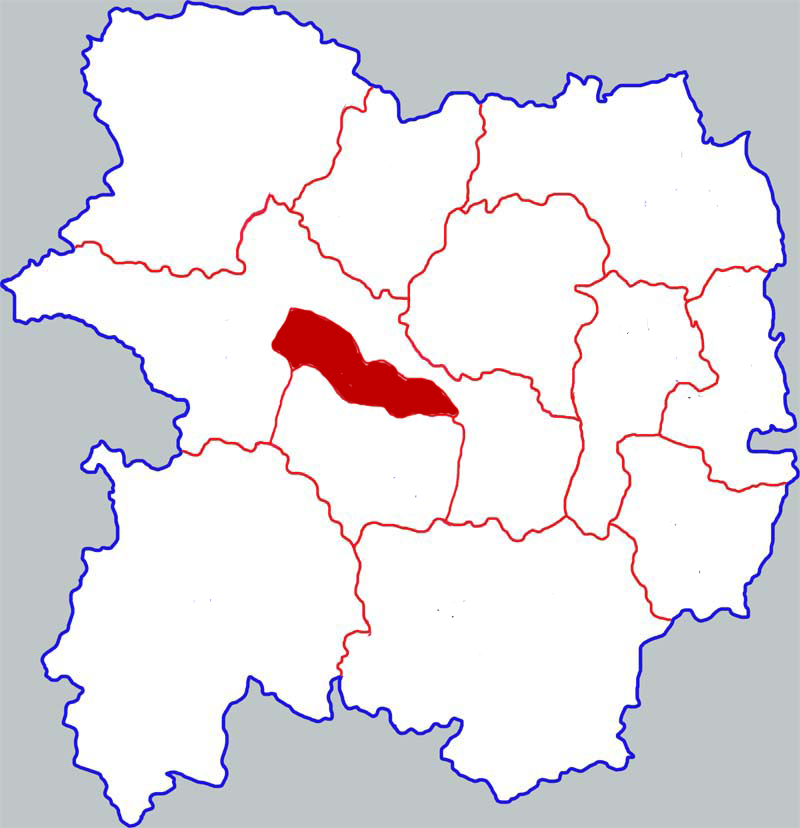
- Jintai in Baoji

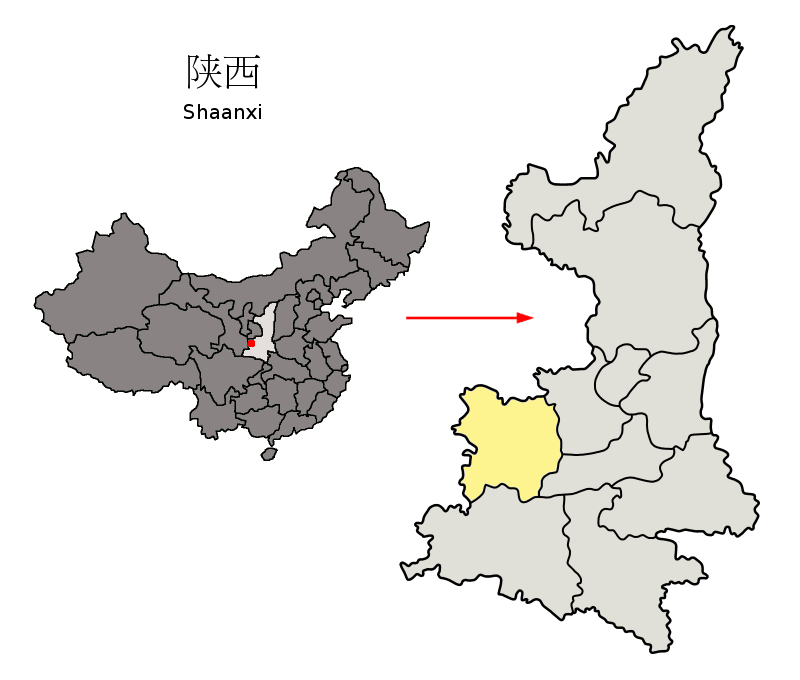
- Baoji in Shaanxi
- Coordinates: 34°22′34″N 107°08′49″E
- Country: People's Republic of China
- Province: Shaanxi
- Prefecture-level city: Baoji

Area
  - Total: 52.16 km^{2} (20.14 sq mi)

Population (2019)
  - Total: 398,300
  - Density: 7,636/km^{2} (19,780/sq mi)
- Time zone: UTC+8 (China standard time)
- Postal code: 721000
- Licence plates: 陕C

Jintai District (simplified Chinese: 金台区; traditional Chinese: 金台區; pinyin: Jīntái Qū; lit. 'gold platform') is a district of the city of Baoji, Shaanxi province, China.

== Administrative divisions ==
As of 2020, this county is divided to 7 subdistricts and 4 towns.

Subdistricts

- Zhongshandonglu Subdistrict (中山东路街道)
- Xiguan Subdistrict (西关街道)
- Zhongshanxilu Subdistrict (中山西路街道)
- Qunzhonglu Subdistrict (群众路街道)
- Dongfenglu Subdistrict (东风路街道)
- Shilipu Subdistrict (十里铺街道)
- Wolongsi Subdistrict (卧龙寺街道)
- Shangmaying Subdistrict (上马营街道)

Towns

- Chencang (陈仓镇)
- Panlong (蟠龙镇)
- Jinhe (金河镇)
- Xiashi (硖石镇)

== Climate ==
Jintai District is located in the inland area of central China, and belongs to the continental monsoon region with a warm temperate semi-humid climate. The four seasons are cold, warm, dry and wet, with long winter and summer and short spring and autumn. In spring, the temperature rises early, but the temperature changes greatly, and there are often spring cold, spring drought, low temperature, frost, little rain, strong wind and other weather. Summer is hot and rainy, with occasional droughts. In early autumn, the temperature drops quickly, with more continuous rain and less light; in mid-autumn, the weather is sunny and cool; in late autumn, there is frost. Winter is cold and dry, with little rain and snow, and drought is prominent.

== Hydrology ==
=== Surface water ===
The area is rich in surface water and groundwater. Surface water includes transit passenger water and self-produced surface water. Self-produced surface water includes rainfall surface runoff and spring water conversion. The total annual runoff of transit passenger water is 2.6546 billion cubic meters, and the total annual runoff of self-produced surface water is 9.132 million cubic meters, including 1.175 million cubic meters of spring water conversion. The average depth of surface water runoff from origin is 151 mm.

=== Ground water ===
The groundwater reserves in this area are about 54.6253 million cubic meters. The reserves in Chuandao District are 45,104,600 cubic meters, that in Poyuan District is 9,520,700 cubic meters, and the annual exploitable volume is 32,510,700 cubic meters. Taking 1982 as an example, the actual mining volume was 35.4362 million cubic meters, and the overexploitation was 2.9255 million cubic meters. The annual exploitable volume in Chuandao District is 29,831,500 cubic meters, and the actual mining volume has reached 34,963,600 cubic meters (including 29,419,900 cubic meters of urban industrial and domestic water), with an overexploitation of 5,132,100 cubic meters. Due to over-exploitation in the old urban area, Shangmaying subdistrict, Shilipu subdistrict and other areas, the groundwater level has dropped year after year, which has formed a funnel.
