= Dongcha railway station =

Railway station in Tianshui, China

Dongcha 东岔

General information
- Coordinates: 34.44343°N 106.53527°E
- System: China Railway High-speed
- Operator: Lanzhou Railway Bureau
- Line: Baoji–Lanzhou high-speed railway
- Platforms: 2 side
- Tracks: 4

History
- Opened: May 6, 2019
Location

Dongcha railway station (simplified Chinese: 东岔站; traditional Chinese: 東岔站; pinyin: Dōngchà Zhàn) is a railway station on the Baoji–Lanzhou high-speed railway in Maiji District, Tianshui, Gansu. The station opened on 6 May 2019.

It is located 22 minutes along the line from Tianshui South railway station and 20 km by road from Dongcha town. Its location on a tall viaduct near Jinlongshan Scenic Area has led it to be nicknamed the 'most beautiful high speed rail station in China'.
