= Dingxi railway station =

Railway station in Dingxi, Gansu, China

Dingxi 定西
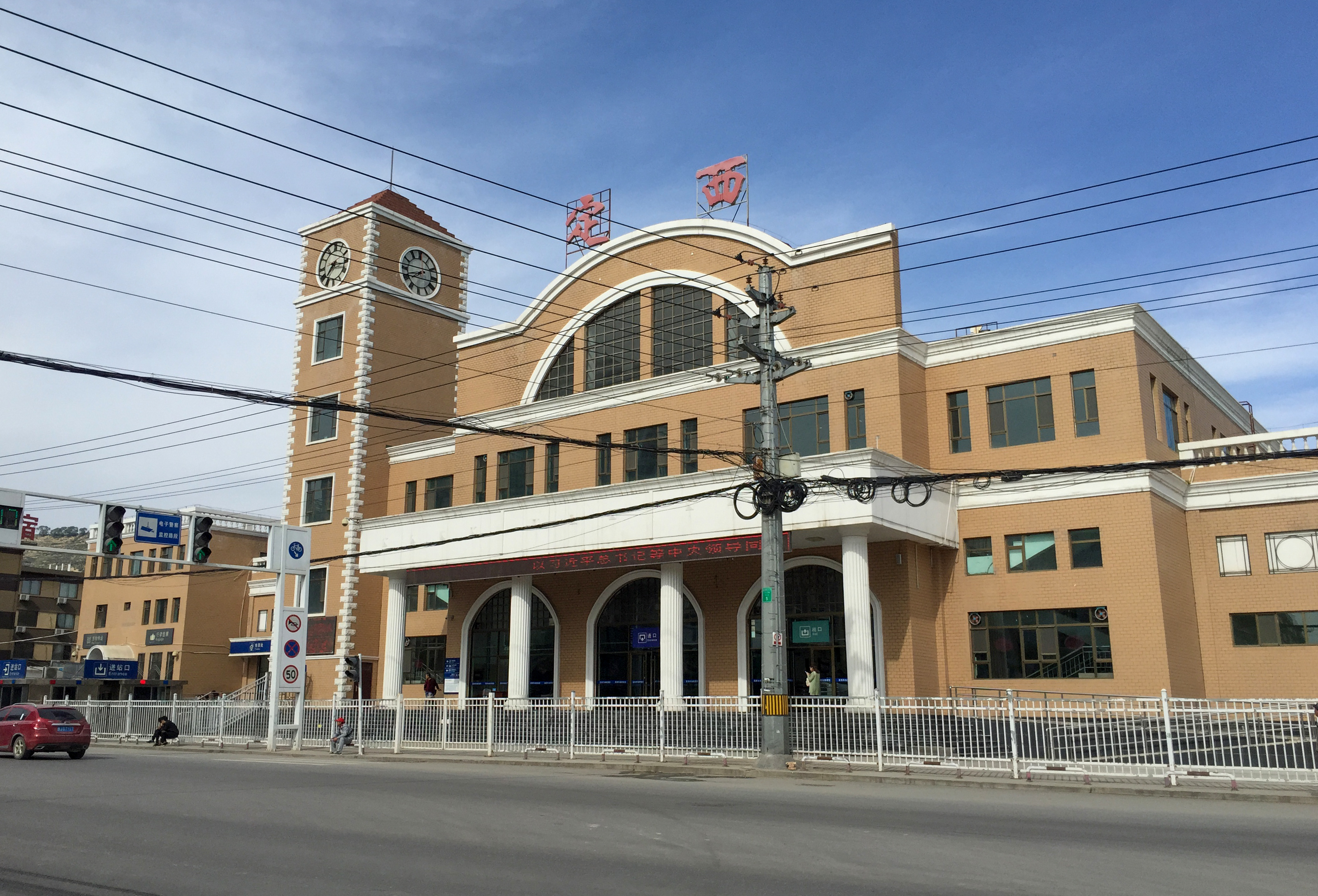
- The station building

General information
- Location: Jiaotong Road, Anding District, Dingxi; Maiji District, Dingxi, Gansu; China
- Coordinates: 35°35′34″N 104°37′20″E
- Operator: CR Lanzhou
- Line: Longhai Railway
- Platforms: 3 (1 side platform and 1 island platform)
- Tracks: 7
- Connections: Bus terminal

Other information
- Classification: Third class

Services
| Preceding station | China Railway | Following station |
|---|---|---|
| Jingjiadian towards Lianyungang East | Longhai railway | Lijiaping towards Lanzhou |
Location
- Location within Gansu Location within China

Dingxi railway station (Chinese: 定西站) is a station on Longhai railway in Dingxi, Gansu.
