= Xuzhou–Lanzhou high-speed railway =

Railway line in China

Xuzhou-Lanzhou high-speed railway

Overview
- Native name: 徐兰客运专线
- Status: In operation
- Owner: China Railway
- Locale: Jiangsu, Anhui, Henan, Shaanxi, Gansu, China
- Termini: Xuzhou East; Lanzhou West

Service
- Type: High-speed rail
- System: China Railway High-speed
- Operator(s): CR Shanghai, CR Zhengzhou, CR Xi'an, CR Lanzhou

Technical
- Line length: 1,395 km (867 mi)
- Number of tracks: 2 (Double-track)
- Track gauge: 1,435 mm (4 ft 8 1/2 in) standard gauge
- Electrification: 25 kV 50 Hz AC (Overhead line)
- Operating speed: Xuzhou–Baoji: 350 km/h (220 mph); Baoji–Lanzhou: 250 km/h (160 mph)
- Signalling: ABS

The Xuzhou–Lanzhou high-speed railway (or Xuzhou–Lanzhou Passenger Dedicated Line) is a high-speed railway in China. It is one of the four vertical and four horizontal passenger dedicated lines in China's medium- and long-term railway planning, and is also part of the Eurasia Continental Bridge corridor of China's "Eight Vertical and Eight Horizontal" network. It consists of the Zhengzhou–Xuzhou high-speed railway, the Zhengzhou–Xi'an high-speed railway, the Xi'an–Baoji high-speed railway and the Baoji–Lanzhou high-speed railway. It is about 1,400 km (870 mi) long and connects the northwest, central China and east China. The speed from Xuzhou to Baoji is 350 km/h (220 mph), and the speed from Baoji to Lanzhou is 250 km/h (160 mph). The line was fully opened on 9 July 2017.

== History ==
In 2004, the Zhengzhou–Xi'an high-speed railway was approved for construction by the State Council. The line started construction on 25 September 2005. It was put into operation on 6 February 2010.

Construction of the Xi'an–Baoji HSR began on 28 November 2009. On 19 October 2012, the Shaanxi section of line started construction, and the Gansu section started construction the next day. The line was put into operation on 28 December 2013.

In 2012, the feasibility study report of the Zhengzhou–Xuzhou HSR passed the review of the Ministry of Railways. Construction of the line started on 26 December 2012. The line was put into operation on 10 September 2016.

Construction of the Baoji–Lanzhou HSR started in October 2012. The line was put into operation on 9 July 2017. This completed the Xuzhou-Lanzhou high-speed line.
