= Xi'an–Baoji high-speed railway =

Railway line in Shaanxi, China

Xuzhou–Lanzhou high-speed railway Xi'an–Baoji Section 徐兰高速铁路西宝段

Overview
- Status: Operational
- Locale: Shaanxi
- Termini: Xi'an North; Baoji South

Service
- Type: High-speed rail
- Operator(s): China Railway High-speed

History
- Opened: December 2013

Technical
- Line length: 138 km (86 mi)
- Track gauge: 1,435 mm (4 ft 8 1/2 in) standard gauge
- Minimum radius: 7,000 meters
- Operating speed: 300 km/h (186 mph)

Xi'an–Baoji high-speed railway
- Simplified Chinese: 徐兰高速铁路西宝段
- Traditional Chinese: 徐蘭高速鐵路西寶段
Transcriptions
Standard Mandarin
- Hanyu Pinyin: Xú-Lán Gāosù Tiělù Xī-Bǎo Duàn
- IPA: [ɕǔ.lǎn káʊ.sû tʰjè.lû ɕí.páʊ twân]

Xi'an–Baoji Passenger Dedicated Line
- Simplified Chinese: 西宝客运专线
- Traditional Chinese: 西寶客運專線
Transcriptions
Standard Mandarin
- Hanyu Pinyin: Xī-Bǎo Kèyùn Zhuān Xiàn
- IPA: [ɕí.páʊ kʰɤ̂.ŷn ʈʂwán ɕjɛ̂n]

The Xi'an–Baoji high-speed railway, or Xibao Passenger Dedicated Line is a high-speed railway operated by China Railway High-speed between Xi'an and Baoji, in Shaanxi province. It is a section of the Xuzhou–Lanzhou high-speed railway, and largely parallels the Xi'an–Baoji section of the Longhai Railway.

Construction work on the Xi'an–Baoji high-speed railway started on December 11, 2009. The opening date was 28 December 2013. The total investment of the project is estimated to be CN¥17.967 billion.
