= Eurasia Continental Bridge corridor =

High-speed rail corridor in China

- China Railway High-speed

Overview
- Native name: 陆桥通道
- Status: Operational
- Owner: China Railway
- Locale: Jiangsu province; Anhui province; Henan province; Shaanxi province; Gansu province; Qinghai province; Xinjiang Uygur Autonomous Region
- Termini: Lianyungang; Urumqi

Service
- Type: High-speed rail
- System: China Railway High-speed
- Operator(s): CR Shanghai; CR Zhengzhou; CR Xi'an; CR Lanzhou

Technical
- Line length: 3,422 km (2,126 mi)
- Track gauge: 1,435 mm (4 ft 8 1/2 in) standard gauge
- Electrification: 25 kV 50 Hz AC (Overhead line)
- Operating speed: 200 to 350 km/h (124 to 217 mph)

The Eurasia Continental Bridge corridor (simplified Chinese: 陆桥通道; traditional Chinese: 陸橋通道; pinyin: Lùqiáo Tōngdào) is a high-speed rail corridor connecting Lianyungang, a port in northern Jiangsu province, to Ürümqi, the regional capital of Xinjiang. The corridor passes through the cities of Xuzhou (Jiangsu), Zhengzhou (Henan), Xi'an (Shaanxi), Lanzhou (Gansu), and Xining (Qinghai) en route. Announced in 2016 as part of China's "Eight Vertical and Eight Horizontal" network, the rail corridor is an extension of the existing Xuzhou–Lanzhou high-speed railway.

The railway may be considered to be part of the New Eurasian Land Bridge.

== Sections ==
Section Railway line	Description	Designed speed (km/h)	Length (km)	Construction start date	Open date
Lianyungang–Xuzhou; Lianyungang–Xuzhou high-speed railway	HSR connecting Lianyungang and Xuzhou.	350	180	2017-08-30	2021-02-08
Xuzhou–Zhengzhou; Zhengzhou–Xuzhou high-speed railway	HSR connecting Xuzhou & Zhengzhou	350	357	2012-12-26	2016-09-10
Zhengzhou–Xi'an; Zhengzhou–Xi'an high-speed railway	HSR connecting Zhengzhou & Xian	350	455	2005-09-01	2010-02-06
Xi'an–Baoji; Xi'an–Baoji high-speed railway	HSR connecting Xi'an & Baoji	350	148	2009-11-22	2013-12-28
Baoji–Lanzhou; Baoji–Lanzhou high-speed railway	HSR connecting Baoji & Lanzhou	200 to 250	403	2012-10	2017-07-09
Lanzhou-Urumqi; Lanzhou–Xinjiang high-speed railway	HSR connecting Lanzhou & Urumqi.	200 to 250	1776	2009-11-04	2014-12-26

== See also ==
- High-speed rail in China
