= Lanzhou West railway station =

Railway station in Lanzhou, China

Lanzhou West 兰州西站
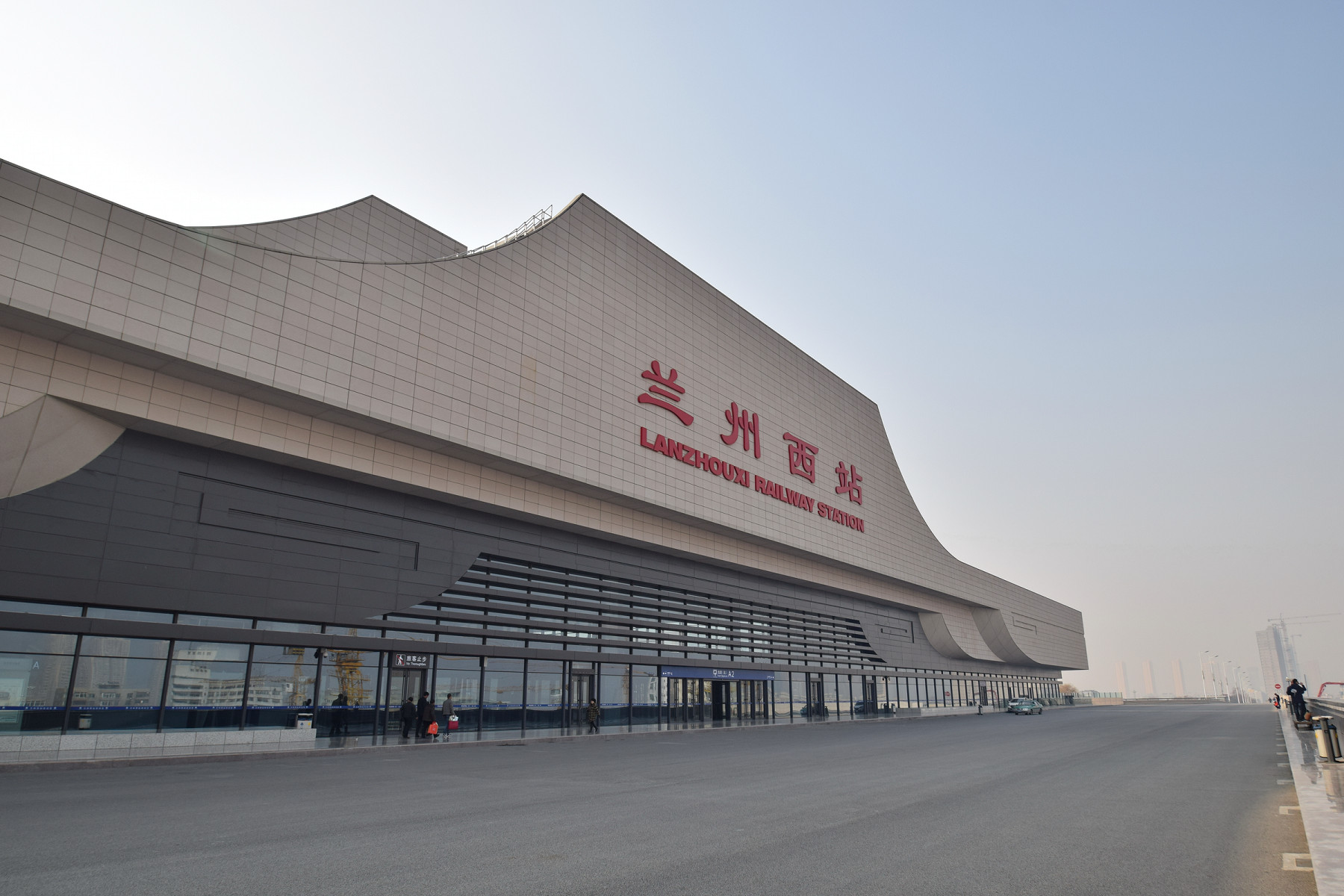
- Lanzhou West railway station

General information
- Other names: Lanzhou Xi
- Location: Xizhan West Road (西站西路), Qilihe District, Lanzhou, Gansu; China
- Coordinates: 36°4′1″N 103°45′11″E
- Operator: Ministry of Railways of the People's Republic of China
- Lines: Longhai Railway, Lanzhou–Xinjiang Railway, Baoji–Lanzhou High-Speed Railway; Lanzhou–Zhongchuan Airport Intercity Railway; Lanzhou–Ürümqi High-Speed Railway
- Platforms: 24 (2 side, 11 island); 4 (metro)
- Connections: Bus terminal

Other information
- Station code: TMIS code: 41492; Telegraph code: LAJ; Pinyin code: LZX
- Classification: Top Class station

History
- Opened: 26 December 2014 (current); 1953 (former)
- Closed: 9 March 2012 (former)
Location

Lanzhou West railway station (Chinese: 兰州西站; pinyin: Lánzhōu Xīzhàn) is located in Qilihe District, Lanzhou, Gansu Province. It is served by the Longhai Railway, Lanzhou–Xinjiang Railway, Lanzhou–Ürümqi High-Speed Railway, Lanzhou–Zhongchuan Airport Intercity Railway and Baoji–Lanzhou High-Speed Railway. It is one of the city's principal railway stations.

== Former Lanzhou West railway station ==
The original station was built in 1953 and was classed as a secondary station within Lanzhou, with most rail traffic stopping at nearby Lanzhou railway station, 8 km to the east. There were just 11 services daily stopping at this station, all for local and regional destinations within Gansu and Qinghai.

The former Lanzhou West railway station officially closed on 9 March 2012 for renovation and construction of the current station complex.

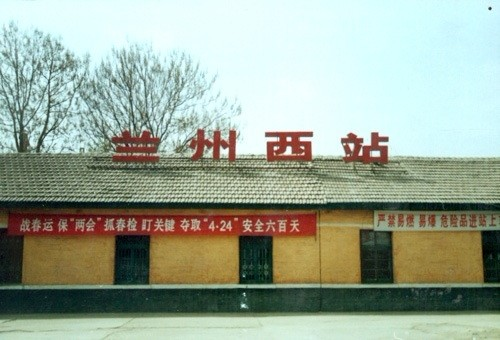
View of the exterior of the old Lanzhou West railway station.

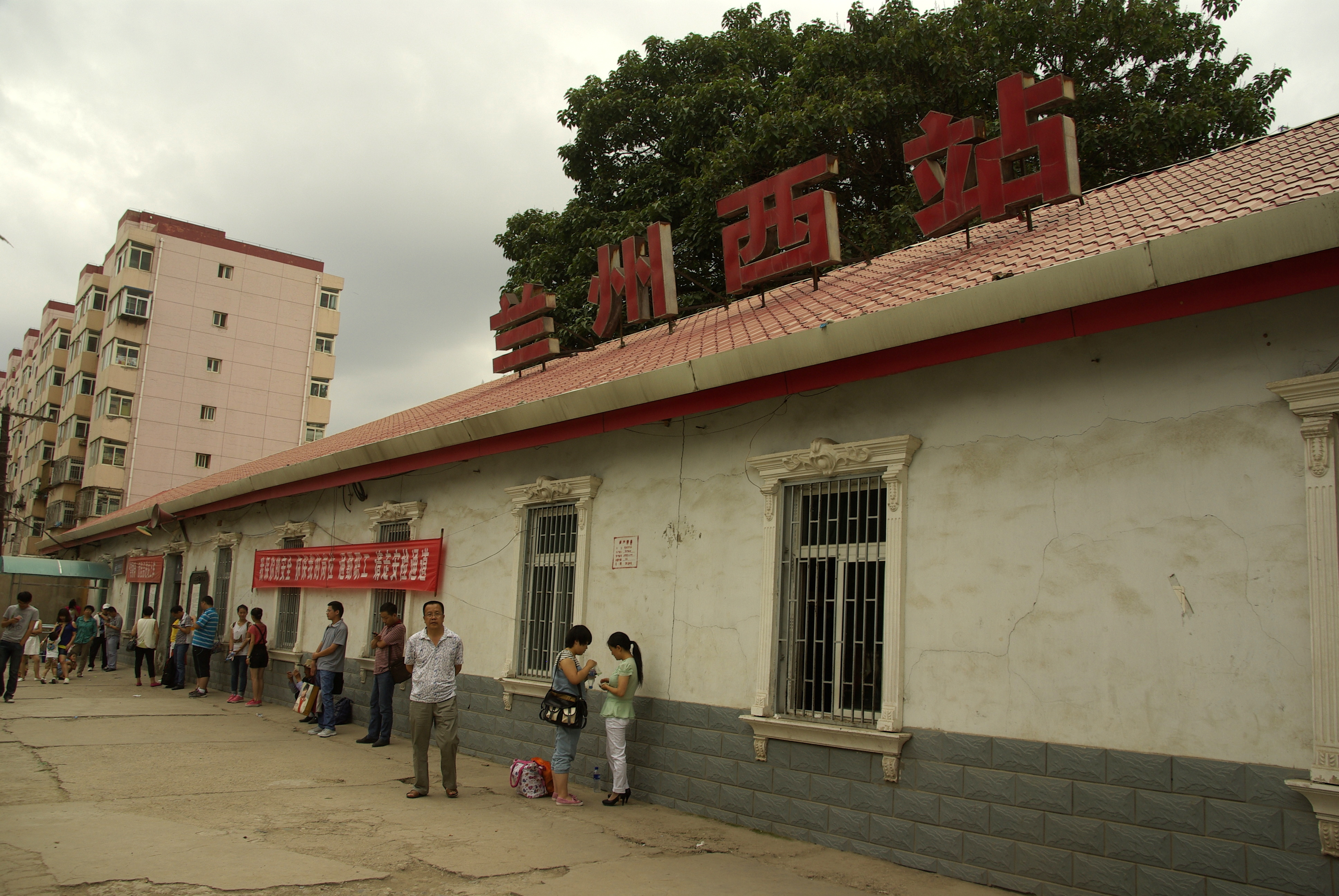
View of the exterior of the old Lanzhou West railway station.

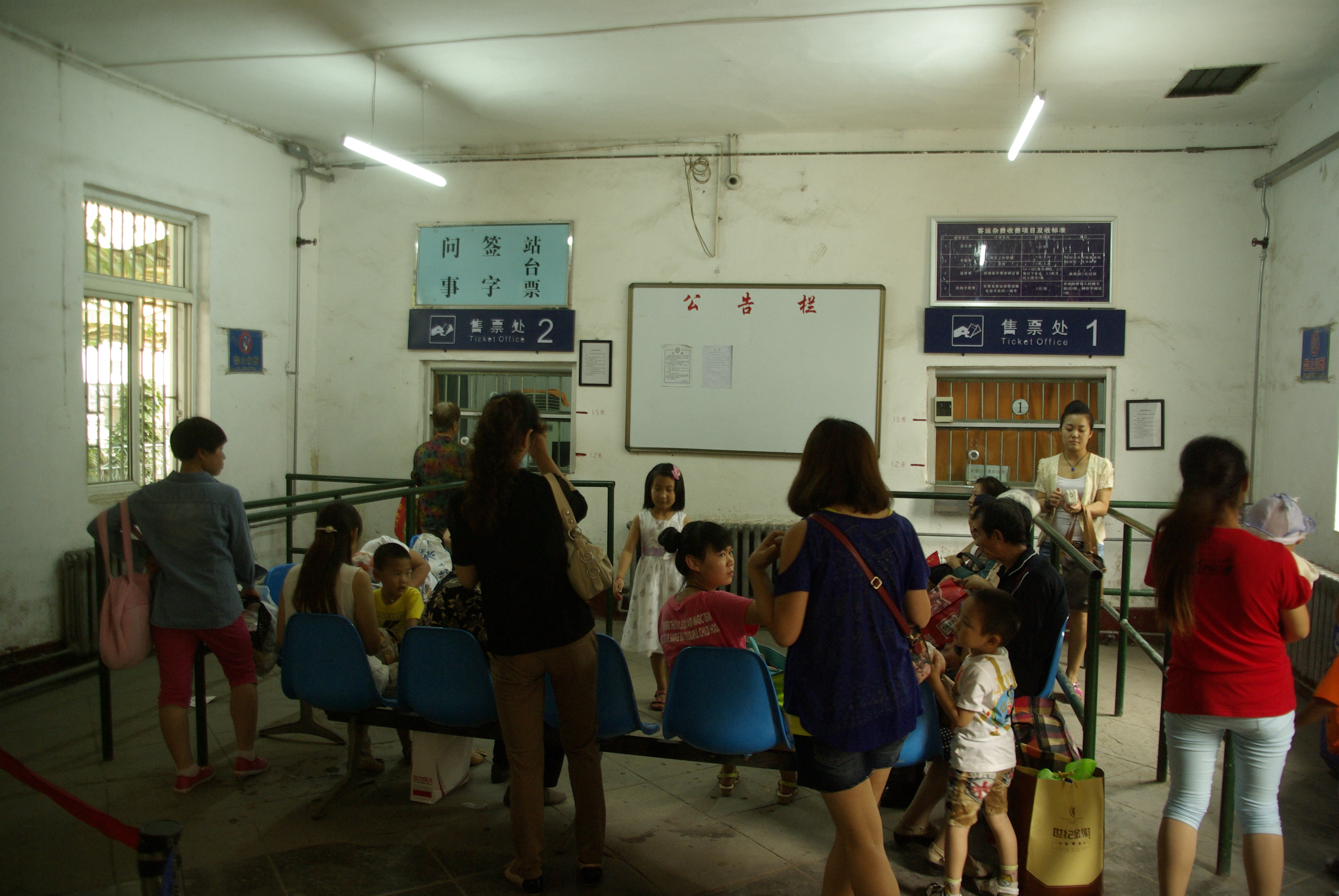
Ticket Hall of the old Lanzhou West railway station. No train service here since March 2013 but ticketing service is still available.

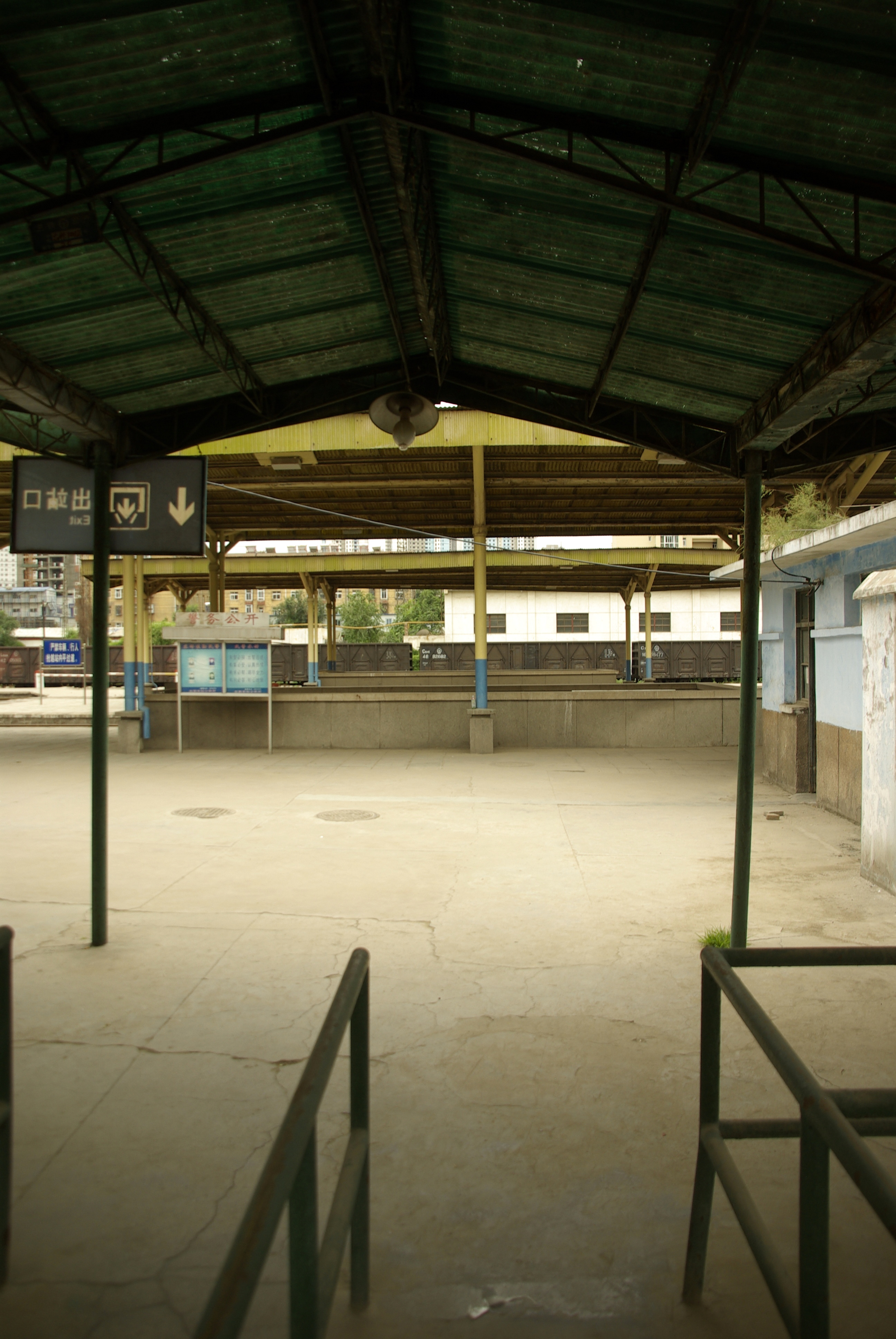
View of the closed platforms of the old Lanzhou West railway station

== Current Lanzhou West railway station ==
Situated a kilometre to the west of the old station, a new high speed railway station was constructed. This station has become the centre for most high speed services in Lanzhou, equalling Lanzhou railway station in importance for long distance and regional rail services. It will also serve as a major transportation interchange with a major long distance and local bus terminal plus connections to Lanzhou Metro's Lines 1 and 2 (U/C). Built on the site of a former rail freight yard at a cost of 3.188 billion Yuan, it dwarfs the former Lanzhou West railway station in almost every respect in terms of size and services. The entire station site encompasses over 680,000m^{2} of space. The station hall is built over 5 main levels, 2 above ground and 3 below, with an area of 220,000m^{2}, making it the largest transportation building in Lanzhou. It features 13 platforms, 2 side platforms and 11 island platforms, servicing 26 tracks. It opened on 26 December 2014. This was in line with the opening of the Lanzhou-Ürümqi High Speed Railway.

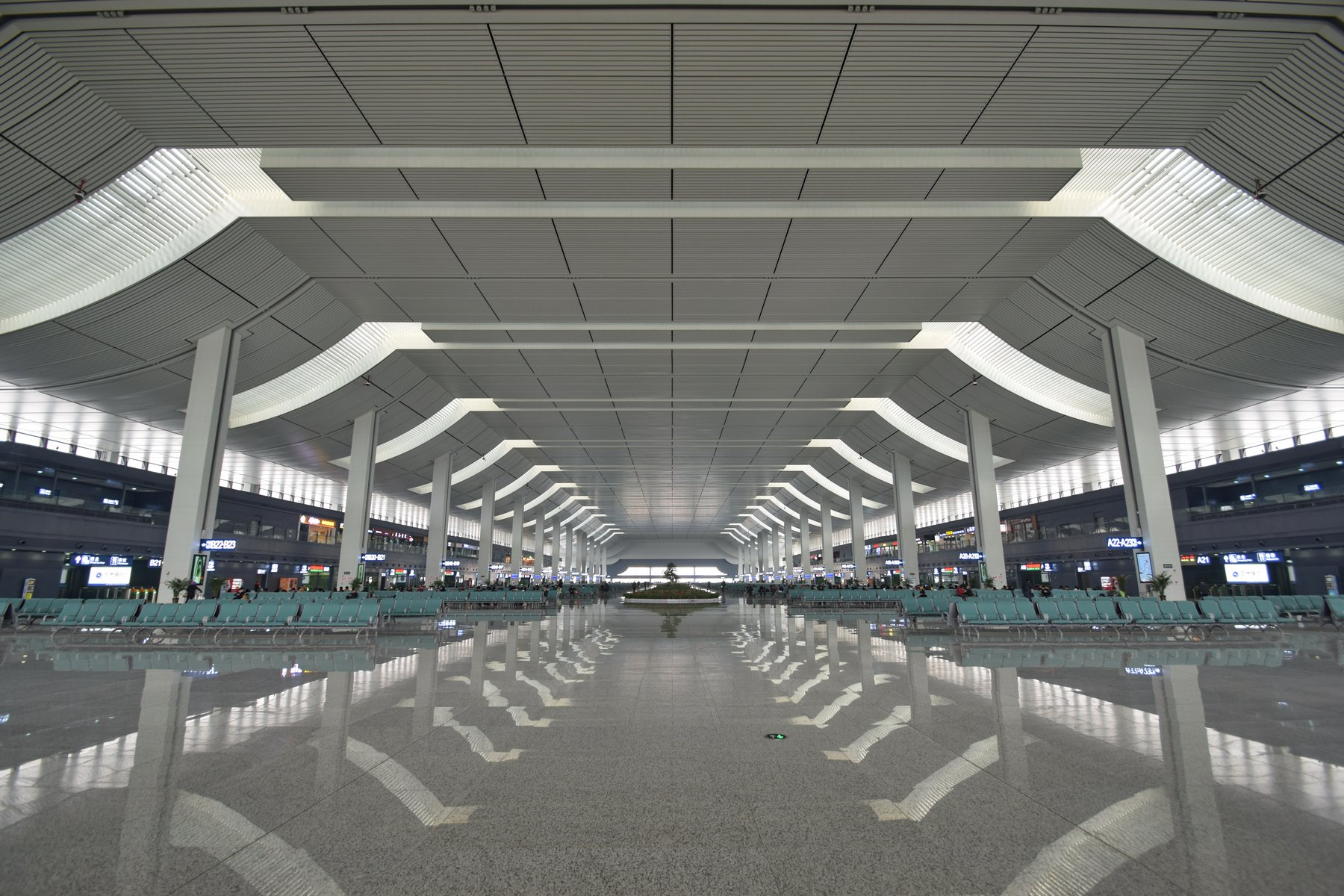
Concourse

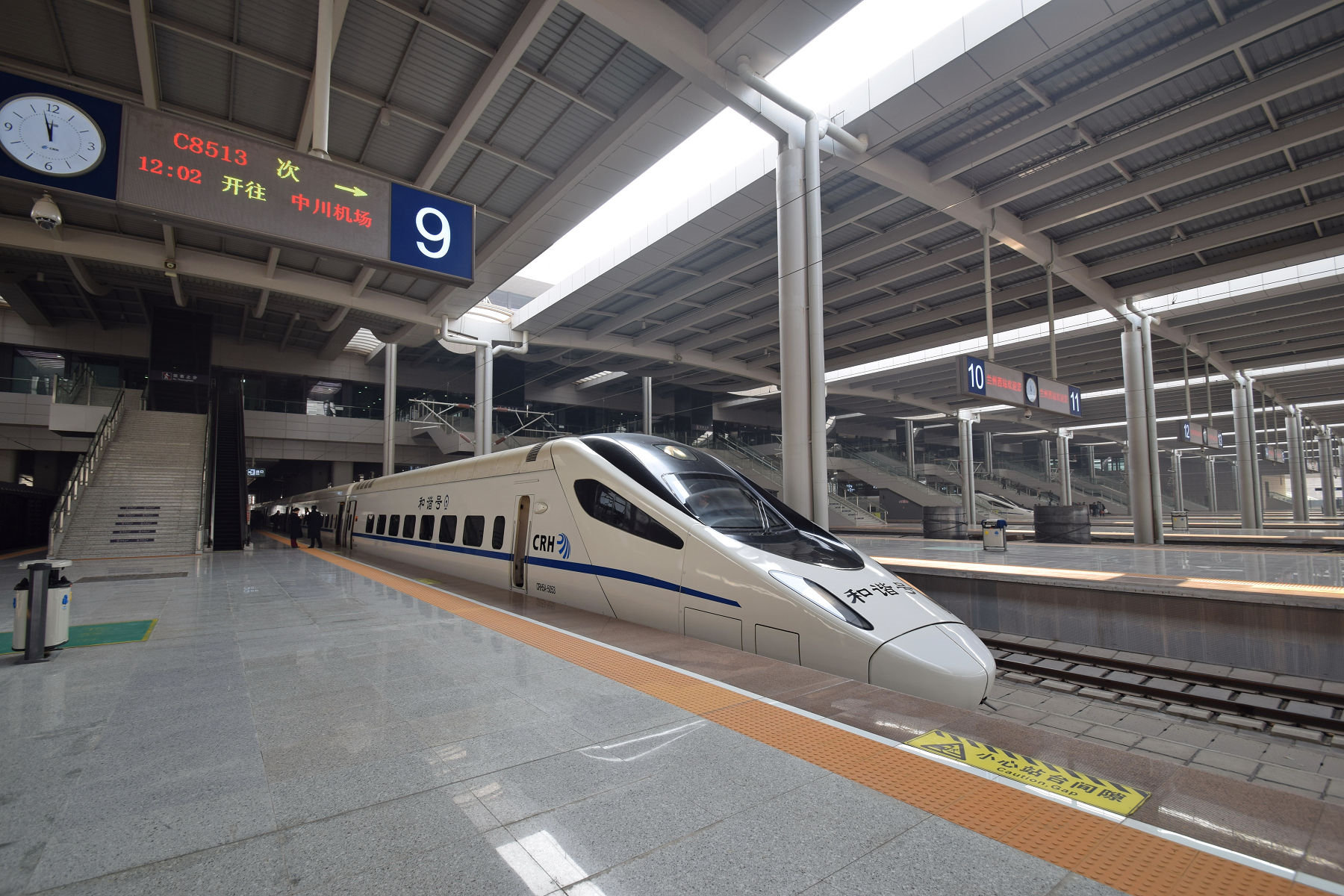
CRH5A bound for Lanzhou Zhongchuan Airport railway station at platform level

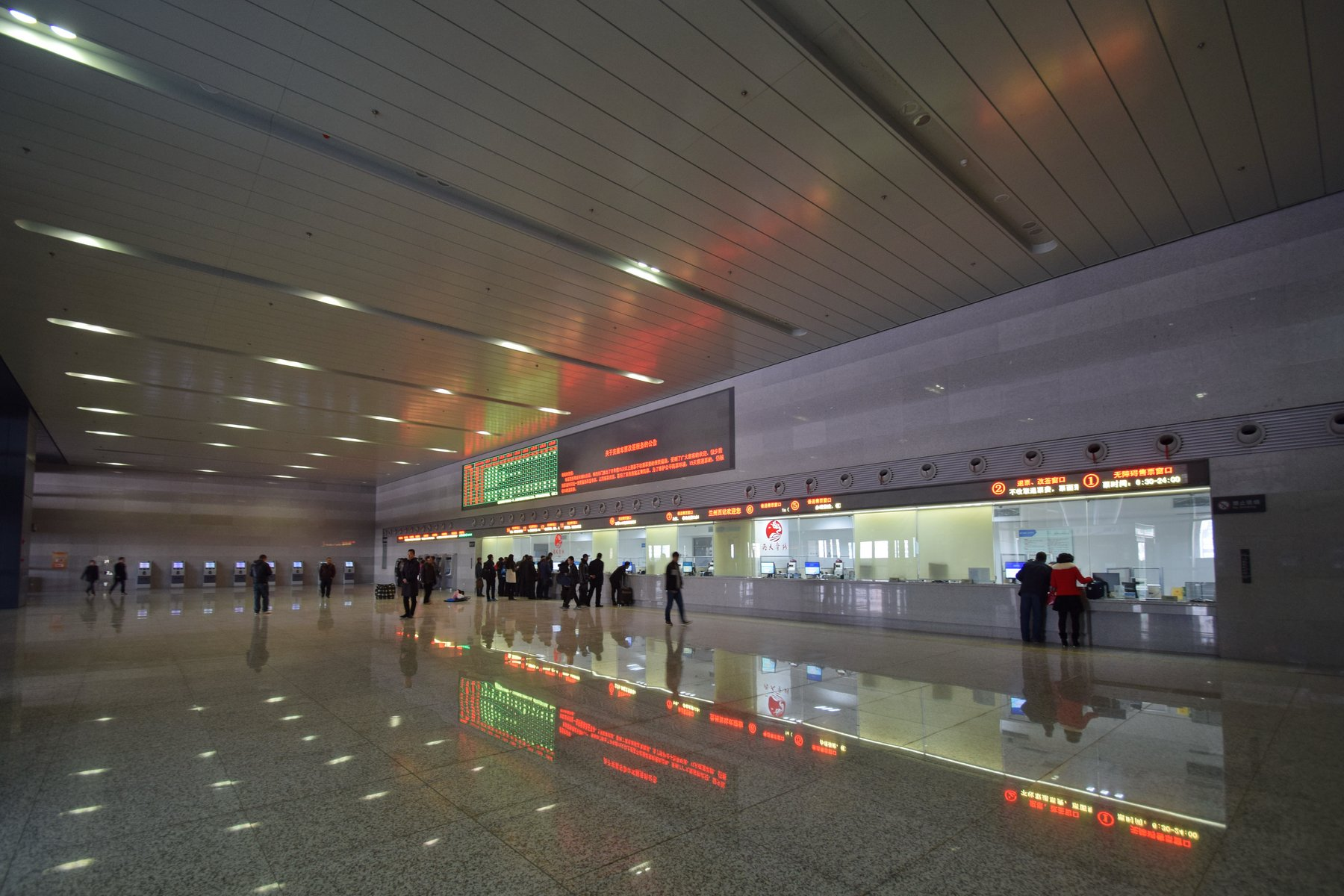
Ticket counters

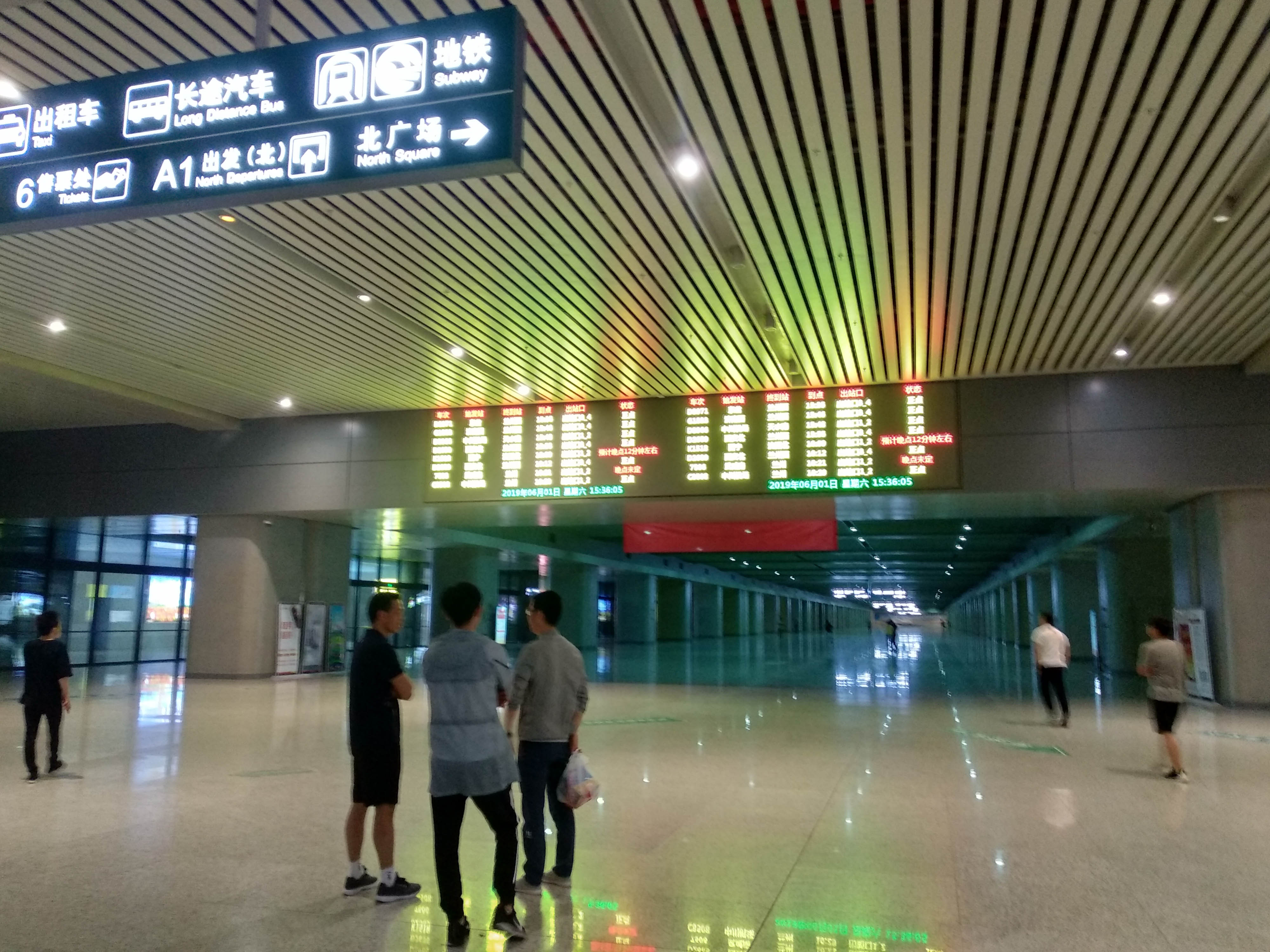
Underground arrivals hall

== Connections ==
=== Bus lines ===
The adjacent bus station (兰州西客站) offers connections to destinations in all directions, including the city centre and Lanzhou railway station.

=== Metro ===
- 1 Line 1
- 2 Line 2 (Under construction)
